= List of Poaceae genera =

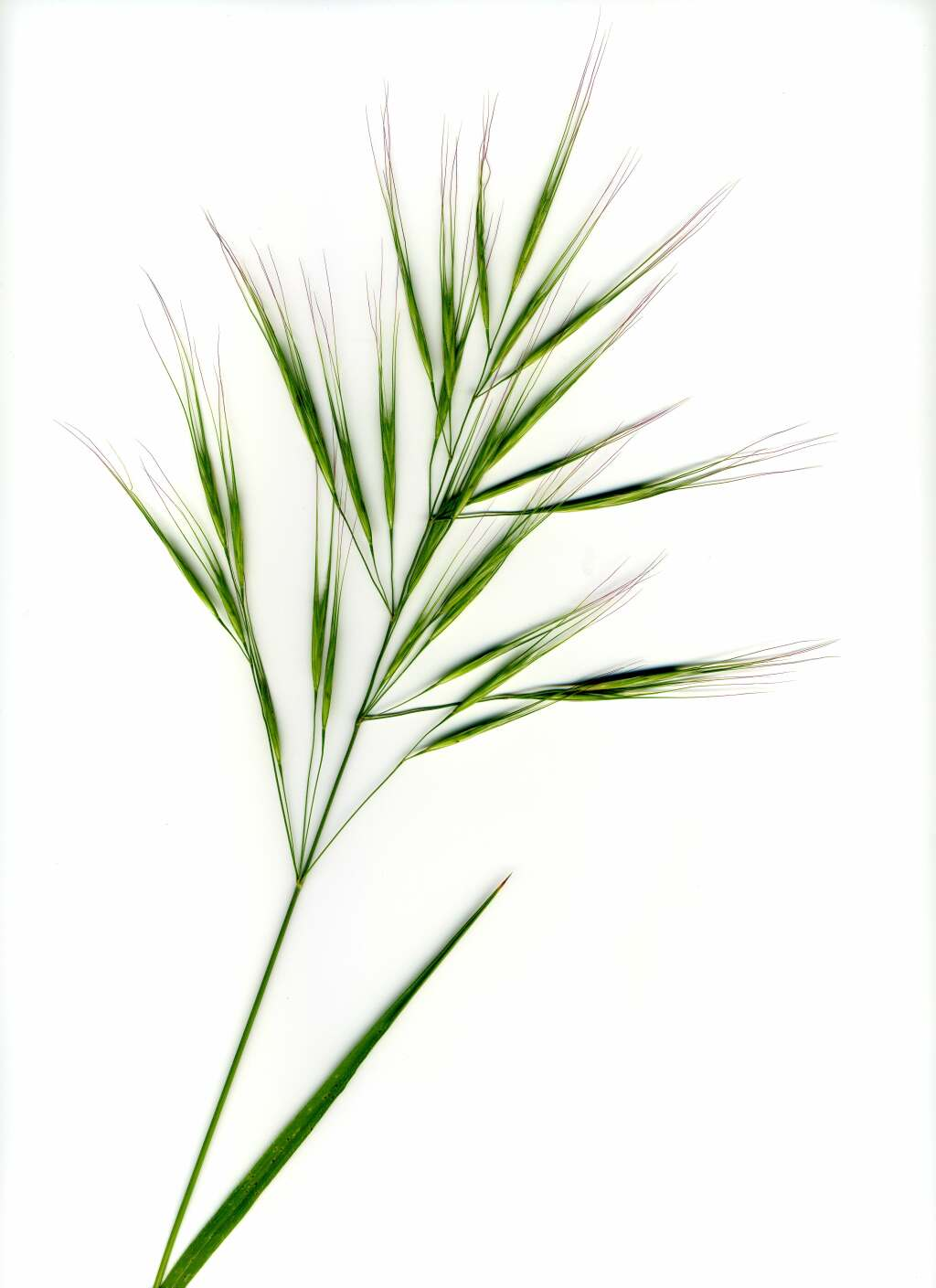
Culm of Bromus sterilis, showing typical grass morphology with blade-like leaves and inflorescence as spikelets organised in a panicle

Poaceae, also known as the true grasses, is the fifth largest plant family in the world with around 12,000 species and roughly 800 genera. They contain, among others, the cereal crop species and other plants of economic importance, such as the bamboos, and several important weeds.

Grasses probably originated in the understory of tropical rainforests in the Late Cretaceous, but have since come to occupy a wide range of different habitats. Notably, they are the dominant species in grasslands, open habitats that cover around one fifth of the earth's terrestrial surface. The C_{4} photosynthetic pathway has evolved at least 22 times independently in the grasses; C_{4} species are more competitive than C_{3} plants in open habitats with high light intensity and warm temperatures.

The deeper relationships in the family have been resolved by recent molecular phylogenetic work. This has been translated into a modern classification which divides the grasses into twelve subfamilies and a number of tribes, with large tribes further divided into subtribes.

Anomochlooideae, Pharoideae and Puelioideae are early diverging lineages containing only a few species. Most of the diversity falls into the two big BOP and PACMAD clades, which each contain roughly half of the family's species. C_{4} lineages have only evolved in the PACMAD clade, whereas many lineages in the BOP clade have evolved adaptations to cold climate.

While the higher-level classification of the grasses is now relatively well understood, taxonomic efforts continue at the species and genera level, and with continuing phylogenetic research, a number of names is likely to change. The list of genera below is therefore likely to evolve with further study.

== Genera ==
809 genera are currently accepted:

=== A ===
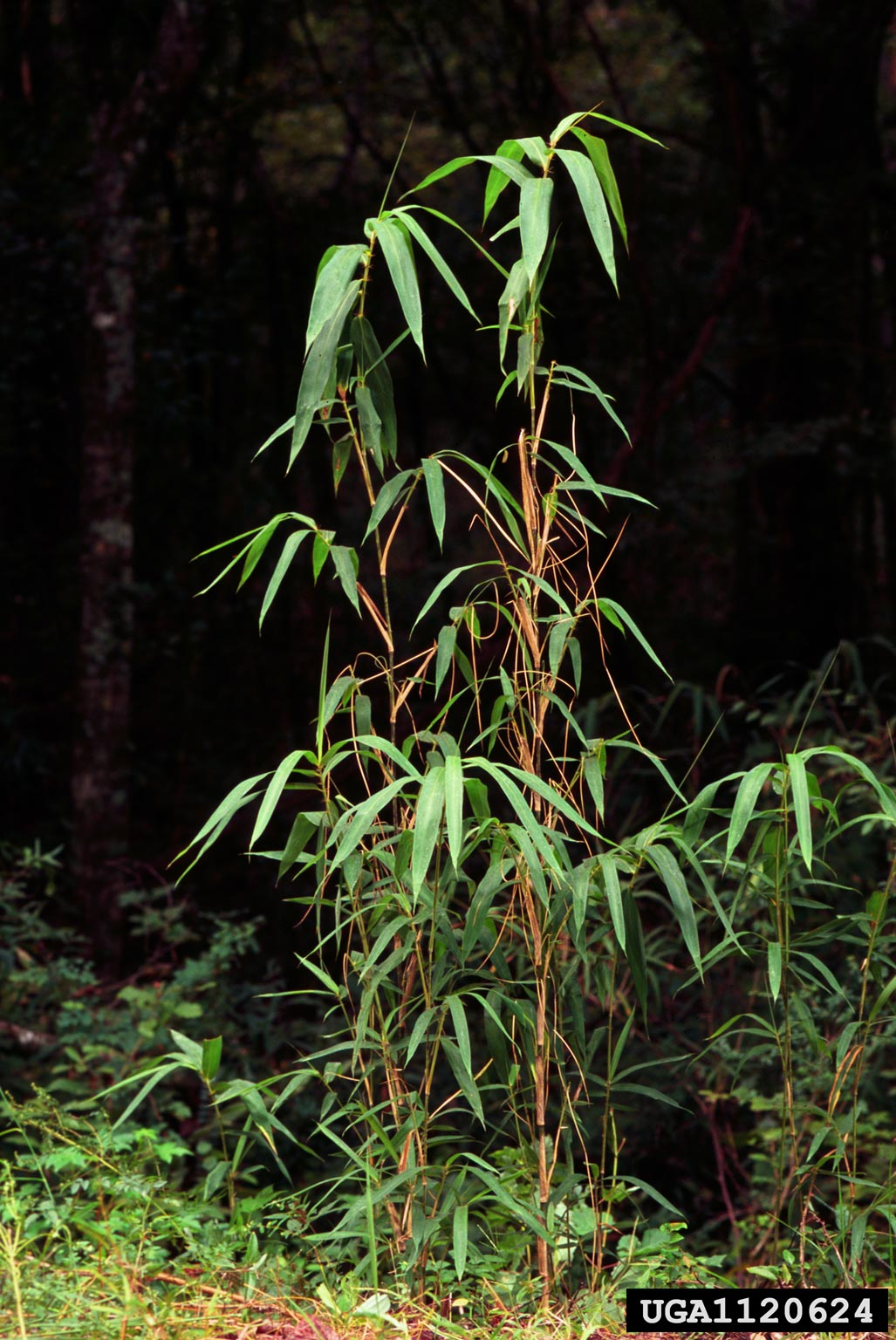
Arundinaria gigantea, a temperate woody bamboo (Bambusoideae: Arundinarieae)

- Aakia J.R.Grande
- Achnatherum P.Beauv.
- Aciachne Benth.
- Acidosasa C.D.Chu & C.S.Chao
- Acostia Swallen
- Acrachne Wight & Arn. ex Chiov.
- Acritochaete Pilg.
- Acroceras Stapf.
- Acrospelion Besser
- Actinocladum McClure ex Soderstr.
- Adenochloa Zuloaga
- Aegilops L.
- × Aegilotriticum P.Fourn.
- Aeluropus Trin.
- Aemulanthus R.P.Oliveira & F.M.Ferreira
- Afrotrichloris Chiov.
- Agenium Nees
- Agnesia Zuloaga & Judz.
- × Agroelymus A.Camus (Agropyron × Elymus)
- × Agropogon P.Fourn. (Agrostis × Polypogon)
- Agropyron Gaertn.
- Agropyropsis (Batt. & Trab.) A.Camus
- Agrostis L.
- Agrostopoa Davidse, Soreng & P.M.Peterson
- Agrostula P.M.Peterson, Romasch., Soreng & Sylvester
- × Agrothinopyrum Su Liu & Bing Liu (Agropyron × Thinopyrum)
- Aira L.
- Airopsis Desv.
- Alexfloydia B.K.Simon
- Alloeochaete C.E.Hubb.
- Allolepis Soderstr. & H.F.Decker
- Alloteropsis J.Presl.
- Alopecurus L.
- Alpagrostis P.M.Peterson, Romasch., Soreng & Sylvester
- Altoparadisium Filg., Davidse, Zuloaga & Morrone
- Alvimia C.E.Calderón ex Soderstr. & Londoño
- Amelichloa Arriaga & Barkworth
- Ammochloa Boiss.
- Ammophila Host – synonym of Calamagrostis
- Ampelocalamus S.L.Chen T.H.Wen & G.Y.Sheng
- Ampelodesmos Link
- Amphibromus Nees
- Amphicarpum Kunth
- Amphipogon R.Br.
- Anadelphia Hack.
- Anatherum P.Beauv.
- Ancistrachne S.T.Blake
- Ancistragrostis S.T.Blake
- Andropogon L.
- Andropterum Stapf
- Anemanthele Veldkamp
- Aniselytron Merr.
- Anisopogon R.Br.
- Annamocalamus H.N.Nguyen, N.H.Xia & V.T.Tran
- Anomochloa Brongn.
- Anthaenantiopsis Mez ex Pilg.
- Anthaenantia P.Beauv.
- Anthephora Schreb.
- Anthosachne Steud.
- Anthoxanthum L.
- Antinoria Parl.
- Apera Adans.
- Apluda L.
- Apochiton C.E.Hubb. – synonym of Coelachyrum
- Apochloa Zuloaga & Morrone
- Apoclada McClure
- Apocopis Nees
- Arberella Soderstr. & C.E.Calderón
- Arctagrostis Griseb.
- × Arctodupontia Tzvelev (Arctophila × Dupontia)
- Arctohyalopoa Röser & Tkach
- Arctophila (Rupr.) Andersson – synonym of Dupontia
- Arctopoa (Griseb.) Prob.
- Aristida L.
- Arrhenatherum P.Beauv.
- Arthraxon P.Beauv.
- Arthropogon Nees
- Arthrostylidium Rupr.
- Arundinaria Michx.
- Arundinella Raddi
- Arundo L.
- Arundoclaytonia Davidse & R.P.Ellis
- Asthenochloa Buse
- Astrebla F.Muell.
- Athroostachys Benth.
- Atractantha McClure
- Aulonemia Goudot
- Aulonemiella L.G.Clark, Londoño, C.D.Tyrrell & Judz.
- Australopyrum (Tzvelev) Á.Löve
- Austrochloris Lazarides
- Austroderia N.P.Barker & H.P.Linder
- Austrostipa S.W.L.Jacobs & J.Everett
- Avellinia Parl.
- Avena L.
- Avenella Bluff ex Drejer
- Avenula (Dumort.) Dumort.
- Axonopus P.Beauv.

=== B ===
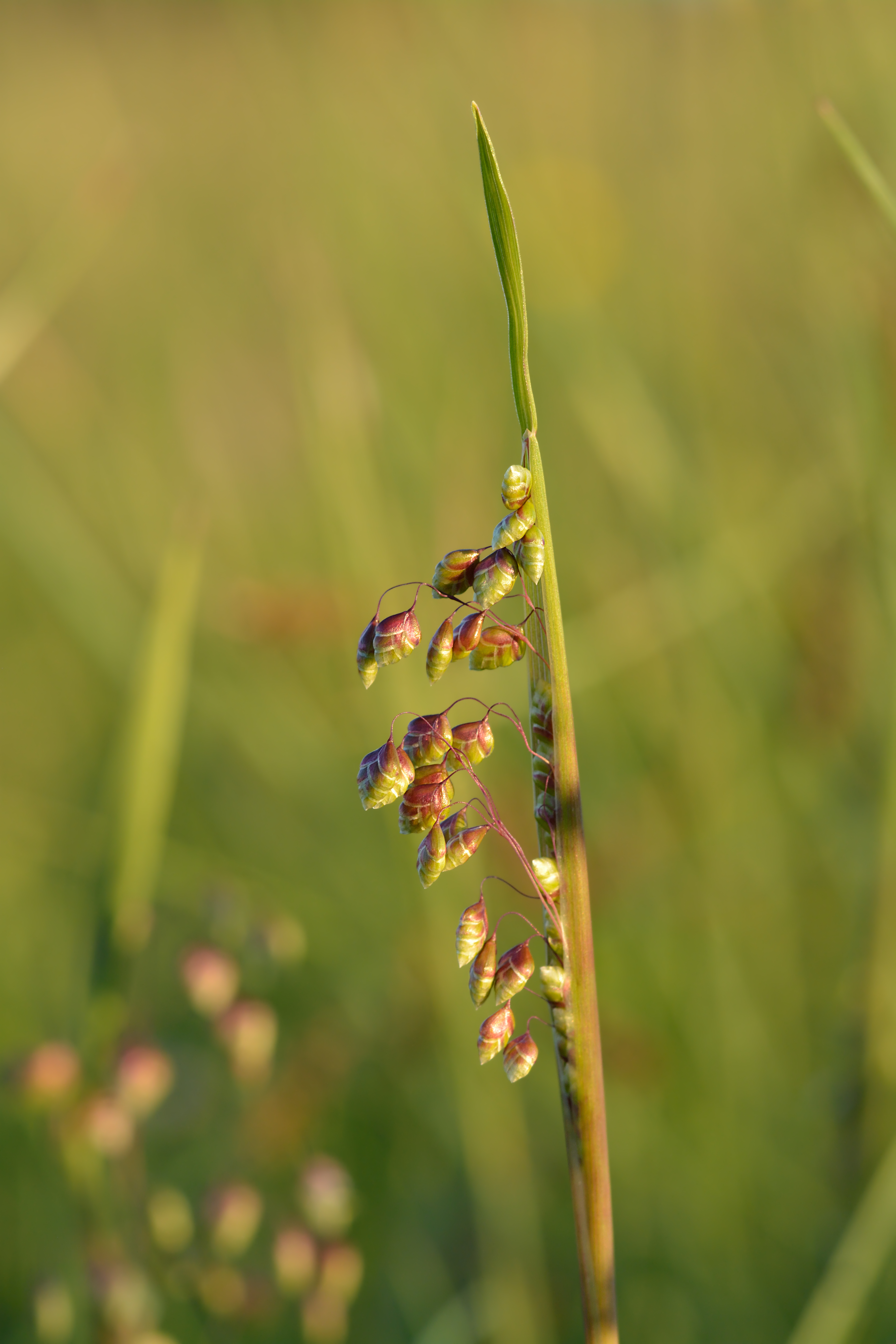
Inflorescence of quaking grass (Briza media, Pooideae: Poeae)

- Bambusa Schreb.
- Baptorhachis Clayton & Renvoize
- Barkworthia Romasch., P.M.Peterson & Soreng
- Bashania Keng f. & T.P.Yi
- Batochloa Salariato & Zuloaga
- Beckmannia Host
- Bellardiochloa Chiov.
- Bergbambos Stapleton
- Bewsia Gooss.
- Bhidea Stapf ex Bor
- Blepharidachne Hack.
- Boldrinia L.N.Silva
- Bonia Balansa
- Borinda Stapleton
- Bothriochloa Kuntze
- Bouteloua Lag.
- Brachychloa S.M.Phillips
- Brachyelytrum P.Beauv.
- Brachypodium P.Beauv.
- Brachystachyum Keng
- Brasilochloa R.P.Oliveira & L.G.Clark
- Briza L.
- Bromuniola Stapf & C.E.Hubb.
- Bromus L.
- Brylkinia F.Schmidt
- Buergersiochloa Pilg.

=== C ===
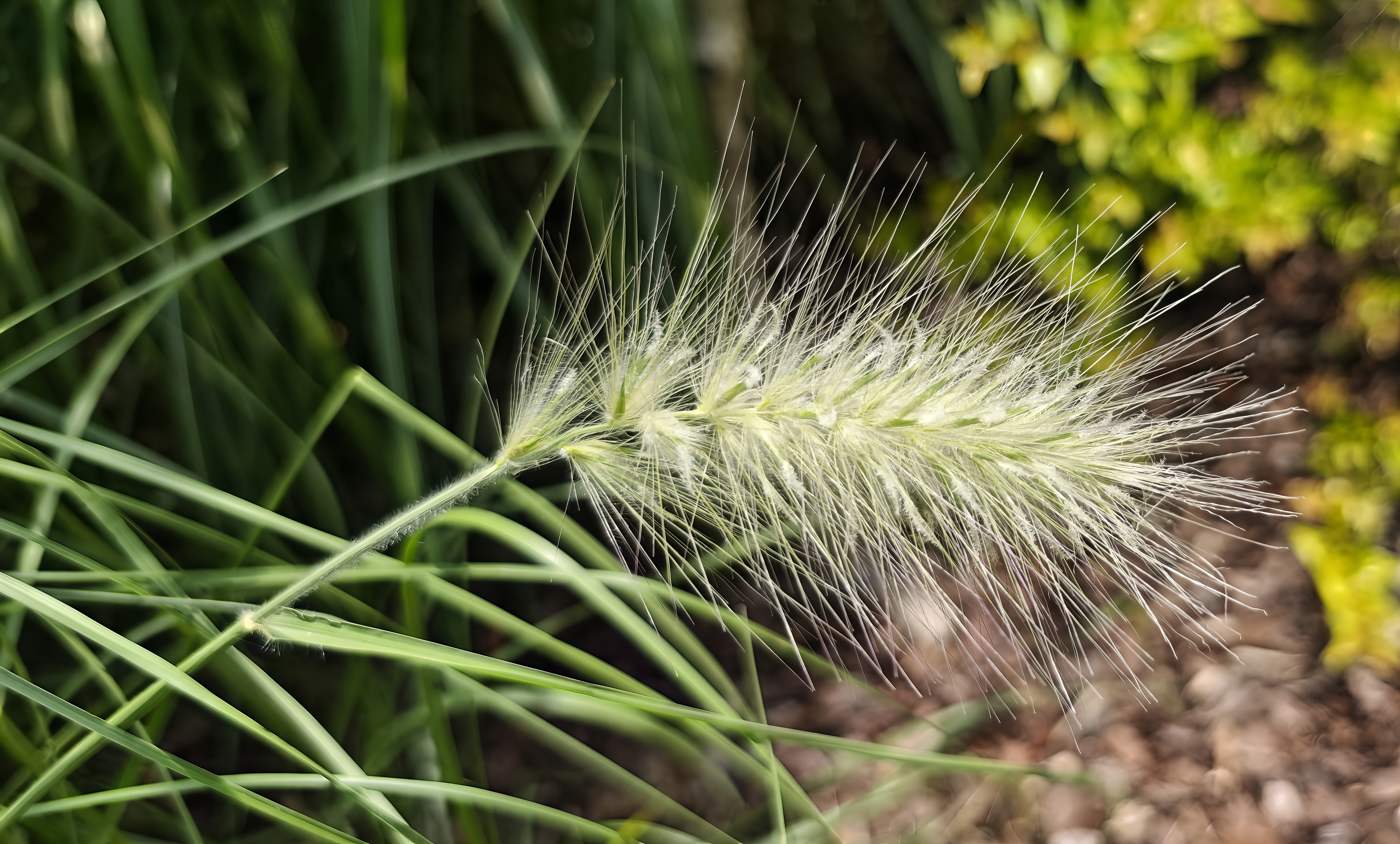
Cenchrus longisetus

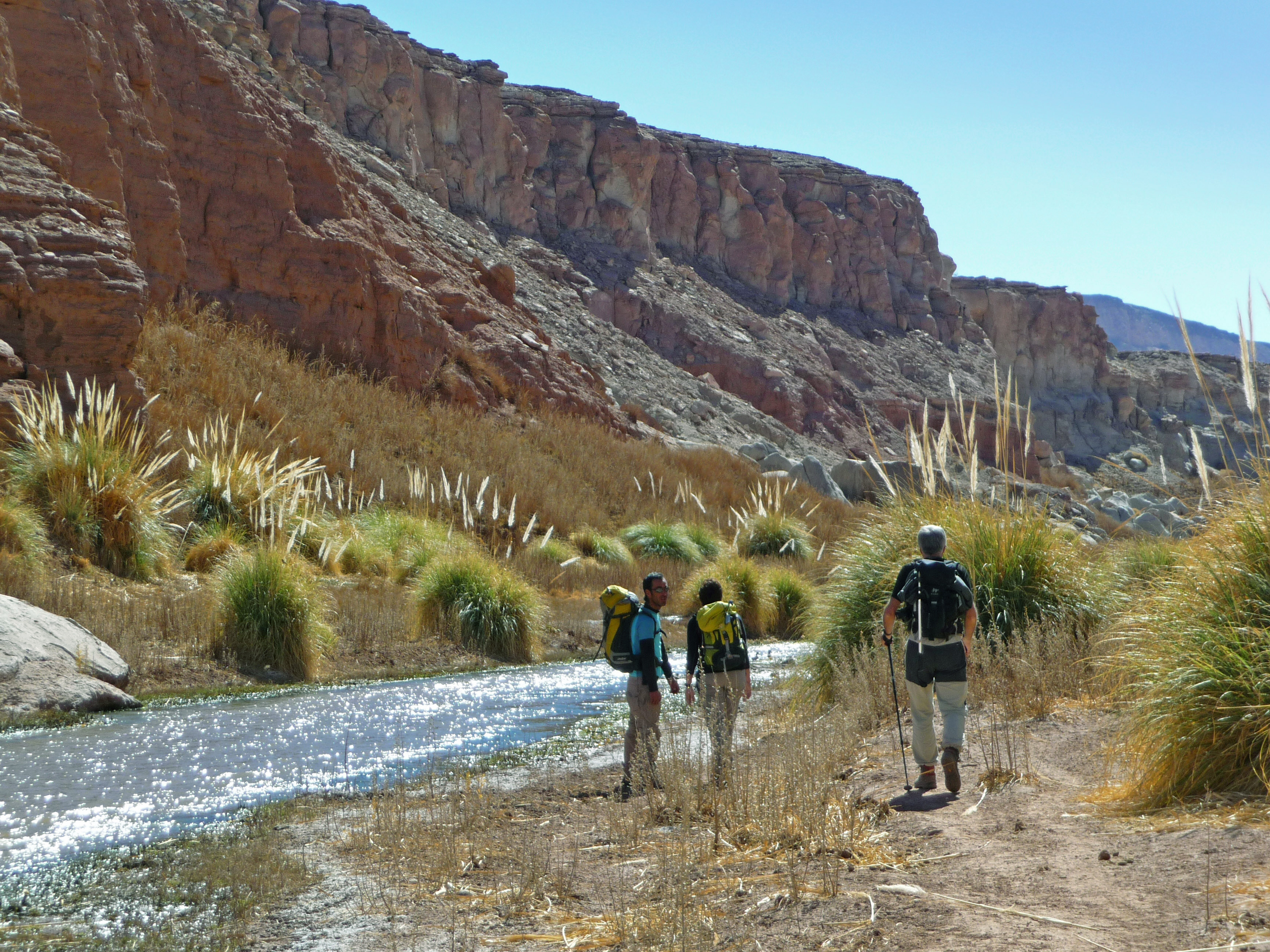
Pampas grass (Cortaderia selloana, Danthonioideae) marking the landscape in Atacama Desert, Chile

- Calamagrostis Adans.
- Calamovilfa (A.Gray) Hack. ex Scribn. & Southw. – synonym of Sporobolus R.Br.
- Calamtrisetum Charit.
- Calotheca Desv.
- Calyptochloa C.E.Hubb.
- Cambajuva P.L.Viana, L.G.Clark & Filg.
- × Campeiordeum Z.H.Feng & Su Liu (Campeiostachys × Hordeum)
- Campeiostachys Drobow
- × Campeyilia Sennikov (Campeiostachys × Kengyilia)
- Canastra Morrone, Zuloaga, Davidse & Filg.
- Capeochloa H.P.Linder & N.P.Barker
- Capillipedium Stapf
- Castellia Tineo
- Catabrosa P.Beauv.
- Catabrosella (Tzvelev) Tzvelev
- Catalepis Stapf & Stent
- × Catanellia L.J.Gillespie & Soreng (Catabrosa × Puccinellia)
- Catapodium Link
- Cathariostachys S.Dransf.
- Celtica F.M.Vázquez & Barkworth
- Cenchrus L.
- Centotheca Desv.
- Centropodia Rchb.
- Cephalostachyum Munro
- Chaetium Nees
- Chaetobromus Nees
- Chaetopoa C.E.Hubb.
- Chamaeraphis R.Br.
- Chandrasekharania V.J.Nair, V.S.Ramach. & Sreek.
- Chascolytrum Desv.
- Chasechloa A.Camus
- Chasmanthium Link
- Chasmopodium Stapf
- Chevalierella A.Camus
- Chikusichloa Koidz.
- Chimaerochloa H.P.Linder
- Chimonobambusa Makino
- Chimonocalamus Hsueh f. & T.P.Yi
- Chionachne R.Br. – synonym of Polytoca
- Chionochloa Zotov
- Chloothamnus Buse
- Chloris Sw.
- Chlorocalymma Clayton
- Chrysochloa Swallen
- Chrysopogon Trin.
- Chusquea Kunth
- Ciliochloa Röser, Tkach & Rasti
- Cinna L.
- Cinnagrostis Griseb.
- Cinnastrum E.Fourn.
- Cladoraphis Franch.
- Clausospicula Lazarides
- Cleistachne Benth. – synonym of Sorghum Moench
- Cleistochloa C.E.Hubb.
- Cleistogenes Keng
- Cnidochloa Zuloaga
- Cochinchinochloa H.N.Nguyen & V.T.Tran
- Coelachne R.Br.
- Coelachyrum Hochst. & Nees
- Coelorachis Brongn. – synonym of Eremochloa
- Coix L.
- Colanthelia McClure & E.W.Sm.
- Coleanthus Seidel ex Roem. & Schult.
- Coleataenia Griseb.
- Colpodium Trin.
- Condilorachia P.M.Peterson, Romasch. & Soreng
- Cornucopiae L. – synonym of Alopecurus
- Cortaderia Stapf
- Corynephorus P.Beauv.
- Cottea Kunth
- Craspedorhachis Benth.
- Crinipes Hochst.
- Crithopsis Jaub. & Spach
- Crypsis Aiton – symptom of Sporobolus
- Cryptachne E.J.Thomps.
- Cryptochloa Swallen
- Ctenium Panz.
- Cutandia Willk.
- Cyathopus Stapf
- Cymbopogon Spreng.
- × Cynochloris Clifford & Everist (Chloris × Cynodon)
- Cynodon Rich.
- Cynosurus L.
- Cyperochloa Lazarides & L.Watson
- Cyphochlaena Hack.
- Cyphonanthus Zuloaga & Morrone
- Cyrtochloa S.Dransf.
- Cyrtococcum Stapf

=== D ===
- Dactylis L.
- Dactyloctenium Willd.
- Daknopholis Clayton
- Danthonia DC.
- Danthoniastrum (Holub) Holub
- Danthonidium C.E.Hubb.
- Danthoniopsis Stapf
- Dasyochloa Willd. ex Rydb. – synonym of Munroa Torr.
- Dasypyrum (Coss. & Durieu) T.Durand
- × Dasyticum Su Liu & Bing Liu (Dasypyrum × Triticum)
- Davidsea Soderstr. & R.P.Ellis
- Decaryella A.Camus
- Decaryochloa A.Camus
- Dendrocalamus Nees
- Deschampsia P.Beauv.
- Desmazeria Dumort.
- Desmostachya (Stapf) Stapf
- Diandrolyra Stapf
- Diarrhena P.Beauv.
- Dichaetaria Nees ex Steud.
- Dichanthelium (Hitchc. & Chase) Gould
- Dichanthium P.Willemet
- Dichelachne Engl. – synonym of Pentapogon R.Br.
- Didymogonyx (L.G.Clark & Londoño) C.D.Tyrrell, L.G.Clark & Londoño
- Diectomis Kunth
- Digitaria Haller
- Dignathia Stapf
- Diheteropogon Stapf
- Dilophotriche (C.E.Hubb.) Jacq.-Fél.
- Dimeria R.Br.
- Dimorphochloa S.T.Blake
- Dinebra Jacq.
- Dinochloa Buse
- Diplachne P.Beauv.
- Disakisperma Steud.
- Dissanthelium Trin. – synonym of Poa L.
- Dissochondrus (Hillebr.) Kuntze
- Distichlis Raf.
- Drakkaria C.Silva & Zuloaga
- Dregeochloa Conert
- Drepanostachyum Keng f.
- Dryopoa Vickery
- Dupontia R.Br.
- Dupontiopsis Soreng, L.J.Gillespie & Koba
- × Dupontopoa Prob. (Dupontia × Poa)
- Duthiea Hack. ex Procop.

=== E ===
- Eccoptocarpha Launert
- Echinaria Desf.
- Echinochloa P.Beauv.
- Echinolaena Desv.
- Echinopogon P.Beauv.
- Ectrosia R.Br. - synonym of Eragrostis
- Ehrharta Thunb.
- Ekmanochloa Hitchc.
- Eleusine Gaertn.
- Elionurus Humb. & Bonpl. ex Willd.
- Ellisochloa P.M.Peterson & N.P.Barker
- × Elyhordeum Mansf. (Elymus × Hordeum)
- × Elyleymus B.R.Baum (Elymus × Leymus)
- Elymandra Stapf
- × Elymostachys Tzvelev (Elymus × Psathyrostachys)
- Elymus L.
- Elytrigia Desv. – synonym of Elymus
- Elytrophorus P.Beauv.
- Elytrostachys McClure
- Enneapogon Desv. ex P.Beauv.
- Enteropogon Nees
- Entolasia Stapf
- Entoplocamia Stapf
- Eragrostiella Bor
- Eragrostis Wolf
- Eremitis Döll
- Eremocaulon Soderstr. & Londoño
- Eremochloa Buse
- Eremopyrum (Ledeb.) Jaub. & Spach
- Eriachne R.Br.
- Erianthecium Parodi
- Erianthus Michx.
- Eriochloa Kunth
- Eriochrysis P.Beauv.
- Eriocoma Nutt.
- Erioneuron Nash
- × Eriosella Romasch. (Eriocoma × Nassella)
- Euclasta Franch.
- Eulalia Kunth
- Eulaliopsis Honda
- Eustachys Desv.
- Exotheca Andersson

=== F ===
- Falona Adans.
- Fargesia Franch.
- Farrago Clayton
- Ferrocalamus Hsueh & Keng f.
- Festuca Tourn. ex L.
- Festucopsis (C.E.Hubb.) Melderis
- × Festulolium Asch. & Graebn. (Festuca × Lolium)
- Filgueirasia Guala
- Fimbribambusa Widjaja
- Fingerhuthia Lehm.
- Froesiochloa G.A.Black

=== G ===
- Gaoligongshania D.Z.Li, Hsueh & N.H.Xia
- Garnotia Brongn.
- Gastridium P.Beauv.
- Gaudinia P.Beauv.
- Gelidocalamus T.H.Wen
- Geochloa H.P.Linder & N.P.Barker
- Germainia Balansa & Poitr.
- Gerritea Zuloaga, Morrone & Killeen
- × Gigantocalamus K.M.Wong (Dendrocalamus × Gigantochloa)
- Gigantochloa Kurz ex Munro
- Gilgiochloa Pilg.
- Glaziophyton Franch.
- Glyceria R.Br.
- Glyphochloa Clayton
- Gouinia E.Fourn. ex Benth. & Hook.f.
- Graciliotrisetum (Chrtek) Barberá & Quintanar
- Graphephorum Desv.
- Greeneochloa P.M.Peterson, Soreng, Romasch. & Barberá
- Greslania Balansa
- Guadua Kunth
- Guaduella Franch.
- Gymnopogon P.Beauv.
- Gynerium Willd. ex P.Beauv.

=== H ===
- Habrochloa C.E.Hubb.
- Hackelochloa Kuntze
- Hainardia Greuter – synonym of Parapholis
- Hakonechloa Makino ex Honda
- Halopyrum Stapf
- Harpachne Hochst. ex A.Rich.
- Harpochloa Kunth
- Helictochloa Romero Zarco
- Helictotrichon Besser
- Hemarthria R.Br.
- Hemisorghum C.E.Hubb.
- Henrardia C.E.Hubb.
- Hesperostipa (Elias) Barkworth
- Heterachne Benth. – synonym of Eragrostis
- Heteranthelium Hochst. ex Jaub. & Spach
- Heteranthoecia Stapf
- Heteropholis C.E.Hubb.
- Heteropogon Pers.
- Hickelia A.Camus
- Hierochloe R.Br. – synonym of Anthoxanthum
- Hilaria Kunth
- Hitchcockella A.Camus
- Holcolemma Stapf & C.E.Hubb.
- Holcus L.
- Holttumochloa K.M.Wong
- Homolepis Chase
- Homopholis C.E.Hubb.
- Homozeugos Stapf
- Hookerochloa E.B.Alexeev
- Hopia Zuloaga & Morrone
- Hordelymus (Jess.) Harz
- Hordeum L.
- Hsuehochloa D.Z.Li & Y.X.Zhang
- Hubbardia Bor
- Hubbardochloa Auquier
- Humbertochloa A.Camus & Stapf
- Hyalopoa (Tzvelev) Tzvelev
- Hyalopodium Röser & Tkach
- Hydrothauma C.E.Hubb.
- Hygrochloa Lazarides
- Hygroryza Nees
- Hylebates Chippind.
- Hymenachne P.Beauv.
- Hyparrhenia Andersson ex E.Fourn.
- Hyperthelia Clayton
- Hypseochloa C.E.Hubb.

=== I ===
- Ichnanthus P.Beauv.
- Imperata Cirillo
- Indocalamus Nakai
- Indopoa Bor
- Indosasa McClure
- Isachne R.Br.
- Ischaemum L.
- Iseilema Andersson
- Ixophorus Schltdl.

=== J ===
- Janochloa Zuloaga & Delfini
- Jansenella Bor
- Jarava Ruiz & Pav.
- Jouvea E.Fourn.

=== K ===
- Kalinia H.L.Bell & Columbus
- Kampochloa Clayton
- Kaokochloa De Winter
- Kellochloa Lizarazu, Nicola & Scataglini
- × Kengdoroegneria Olshanskyi (Kengyilia × Pseudoroegneria)
- Kengiochloa Y.H.Tong & N.H.Xia
- Kengyilia C.Yen & J.L.Yang
- Keratochlaena Morrone & Zuloaga
- Kerriochloa C.E.Hubb.
- Khoonmengia N.H.Xia, Y.H.Tong & X.R.Zheng
- Kinabaluchloa K.M.Wong
- Koeleria Pers.
- Koordersiochloa Merr.
- Kuruna Attigala, Kaththr. & L.G.Clark

=== L ===
- Lachnagrostis Trin.
- Laegaardia P.M.Peterson, Soreng, Romasch. & Barberá
- Lagurus L.
- Lamarckia Moench
- Laobambos Haev., Lamxay & D.Z.Li
- Lasiacis (Griseb.) Hitchc.
- Lasiorhachis (Hack.) Stapf
- Lasiurus Boiss.
- Lecomtella A.Camus
- Leersia Sw.
- Leptagrostis C.E.Hubb.
- Leptaspis R.Br.
- Leptocarydion Hochst. ex Stapf
- Leptochloa P.Beauv.
- Leptothrium Kunth
- Lepturidium Hitchc. & Ekman
- Lepturopetium Morat
- Lepturus R.Br.
- × Leydeum Barkworth (Hordeum × Leymus)
- × Leymostachys Tzvelev (Leymus × Psathyrostachys)
- Leymus Hochst.
- Limnas Trin.
- Limnodea L.H.Dewey
- Limnopoa C.E.Hubb.
- Lithachne P.Beauv.
- Littledalea Hemsl.
- Locajonoa Soreng
- Lolium L.
- Lombardochloa Roseng. & B.R.Arrill.
- Lophacme Stapf.
- Lophatherum Brongn.
- Lophopogon Hack.
- Lorenzochloa Reeder & C.Reeder
- Loudetia Hochst. ex Steud.
- Loudetiopsis Conert
- Louisiella C.E.Hubb. & J.Léonard
- Loxodera Launert
- Luziola Juss.
- Lycochloa Sam.
- Lygeum Loefl. ex L.

=== M ===
- Maclurochloa K.M.Wong
- Maclurolyra C.E.Calderón ex Soderstr.
- Macrochloa Kunth
- Maltebrunia Kunth
- Manisuris L.
- Mayariochloa Salariato, Morrone & Zuloaga
- Megalachne Steud.
- Megaloprotachne C.E.Hubb. – synonym of Digitaria Haller
- Megastachya P. Beauv.
- Megathyrsus (Pilg.) B.K.Simon & S.W.L.Jacobs
- Melanocenchris Nees
- Melica L.
- Melinis P.Beauv.
- Melocalamus Benth.
- Melocanna Trin.
- Merostachys Spreng.
- Merxmuellera Conert
- Mesosetum Steud.
- Metcalfia Conert
- Mibora Adans.
- Micrachne P.M.Peterson, Romasch. & Y.Herrera
- Micraira F.Muell.
- Microbriza Parodi ex Nicora & Rúgolo
- Microcalamus Franch.
- Microchloa R.Br.
- Microlaena R.Br.
- Microstegium Nees
- Milium L.
- Miscanthidium Stapf.
- Miscanthus Andersson
- Mnesithea Kunth
- Mniochloa Chase
- Molineriella Rouy
- Molinia Schrank
- Moliniopsis Hayata
- Monachather Steud.
- Monelytrum Hack.
- Monocymbium Stapf
- Moorochloa Veldkamp
- Morronea Zuloaga & Scataglini
- Mosdenia Stent
- Muhlenbergia Schreb.
- Mullerochloa K.M.Wong
- Munroa Torr.
- Myriocladus Swallen
- Myriostachya (Benth.) Hook.f.

=== N ===
- Nanooravia Kiran Raj & Sivad.
- Narduroides Rouy – synonym of Festuca
- Nardus L.
- Narenga Bor
- Nassella (Trin.) É.Desv.
- Nastus Juss.
- Neesiochloa Pilg.
- Nematopoa C.E.Hubb.
- Neobouteloua Gould
- Neohouzeaua A.Camus – synonym of Schizostachyum
- Neololeba Widjaja
- Neomicrocalamus Keng f.
- Neostapfia Burtt Davy
- Neostapfiella A.Camus
- Neotrinia (Tzvelev) M.Nobis, P.D.Gudkova & A.Nowak
- Nephelochloa Boiss.
- Neurachne R.Br.
- Neyraudia Hook.f.
- Nianhochloa H.N.Nguyen & V.T.Tran
- Nicoraepoa Soreng & L.J.Gillespie
- Notochloe Domin

=== O ===
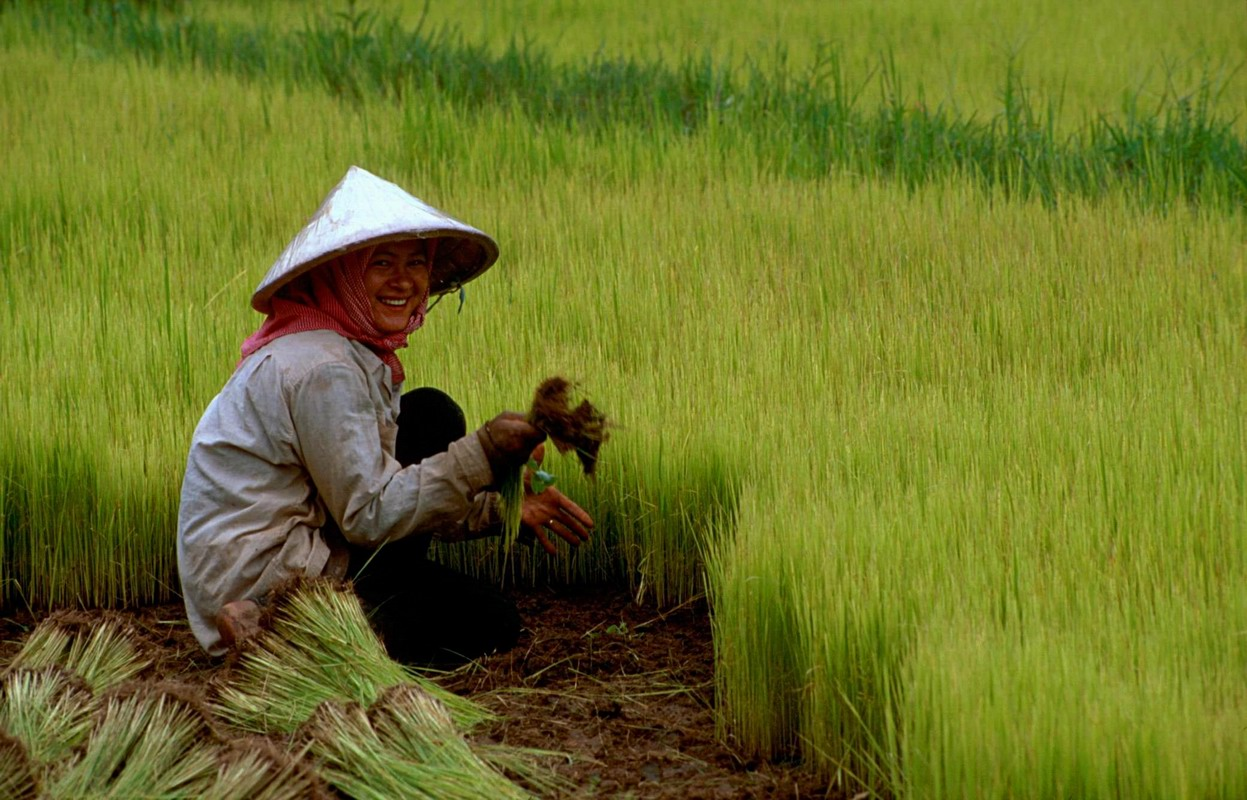
Cultivation of rice, Oryza sativa (Oryzoideae: Oryzeae), in Cambodia

- Ocellochloa Zuloaga & Morrone
- Ochlandra Thwaites
- Odyssea Stapf
- Oedochloa C.Silva & R.P.Oliveira
- Oldeania Stapleton
- Oligostachyum Z.P.Wang & G.H.Ye
- Olmeca Soderstr.
- Oloptum Röser & Hamasha
- Olyra L.
- Oncorachis Morrone & Zuloaga
- Ophiuros C.F.Gaertn.
- Oplismenopsis Parodi
- Oplismenus P.Beauv.
- Orcuttia Vasey
- Oreobambos K.Schum.
- Oreochloa Link
- Oreopoa H.Scholz & Parolly
- Orinus Hitchc.
- Oropetium Trin.
- Ortachne Nees ex Steud.
- Orthacanthus P.M.Peterson & Romasch.
- Orthoclada P.Beauv.
- Orthoraphium Nees
- Oryza L.
- Oryzidium C.E.Hubbard & Schweick.
- Oryzopsis Michx.
- Osvaldoa J.R.Grande
- Otachyrium Nees
- Otatea (McClure & E.W.Sm.) C.E.Calderón ex Soderstr.
- Ottochloa Dandy
- Oxychloris Lazarides
- Oxyrhachis Pilg.
- Oxytenanthera Munro

=== P ===
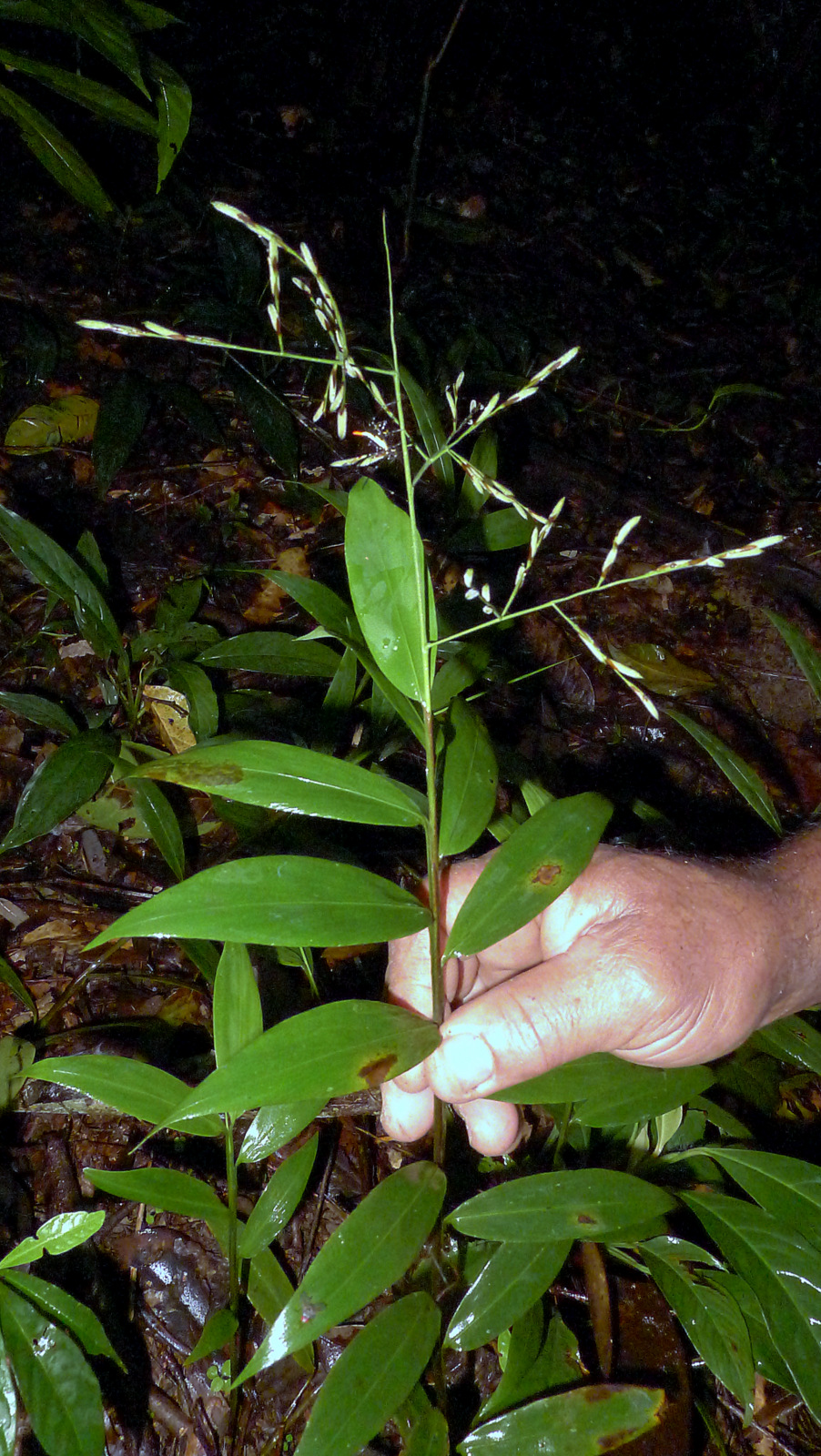
Pharus parvifolius, an early-diverging grass in the subfamily Pharoideae, growing in the understory of tropical rainforest

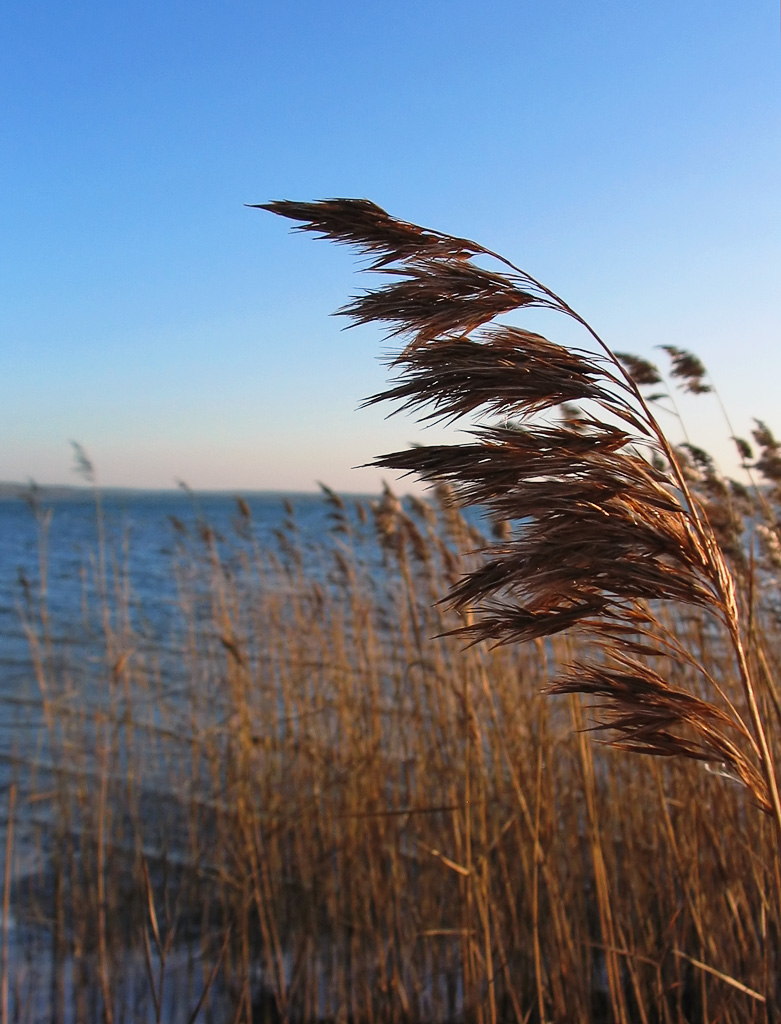
Common reed (Arundinoideae: Arundineae), growing on a lakeshore

- Panicum L.
- Pappagrostis Roshev.
- Pappophorum Schreb.
- Pappostipa (Speg.) Romasch., P.M.Peterson & Soreng
- Parabambusa Widjaja
- Paracolpodium (Tzvelev) Tzvelev
- Paractaenum P.Beauv.
- Parafestuca E.B.Alexeev
- Parahyparrhenia A.Camus
- Paramochloa P.M.Peterson, Soreng, Romasch. & Barberá
- Parapholis C.E.Hubb.
- Paratheria Griseb.
- Pariana Aubl.
- Parianella Hollowell, F.M.Ferreira & R.P.Oliveira
- Parodiolyra Soderstr. & Zuloaga
- Parodiophyllochloa Zuloaga & Morrone
- Parvotrisetum Chrtek
- Pascopyrum Á.Löve – synonym of Elymus L.
- Paspalum L.
- Patis Ohwi
- Patzkea G.H.Loos
- Pennisetum Rich. – synonym of Cenchrus
- Pentameris P.Beauv.
- Pentapogon R.Br.
- Periballia Trin.
- Peridictyon Seberg, Fred. & Baden
- Perotis Aiton
- Perrierbambus A.Camus
- Peyritschia E.Fourn.
- Phacelurus Griseb.
- Phaenanthoecium C.E.Hubb.
- Phaenosperma Munro ex Benth.
- Phalaris L.
- Pharus P.Browne
- Pheidochloa S.T.Blake
- Phippsia (Trin.) R.Br.
- Phleum L.
- Pholiurus Trin.
- Phragmites Adans.
- Phuphanochloa Sungkaew & Teerawat.
- Phyllorachis Trimen
- × Phyllosasa Demoly
- Phyllostachys Siebold & Zucc.
- Pinga Widjaja
- Piptatheropsis Romasch., P.M.Peterson & Soreng
- Piptatherum P.Beauv.
- Piptochaetium J.Presl.
- Piptophyllum C.E.Hubb.
- Piresia Swallen
- Piresiella Judz., Zuloaga & Morrone
- Plagiantha Renvoize
- Plagiosetum Benth.
- Pleioblastus Nakai
- Pleuropogon R.Br.
- Plinthanthesis Steud.
- Poa L.
- Podagrostis (Griseb.) Scribn. & Merr.
- Poecilostachys Hack.
- Pogonachne Bor
- Pogonarthria Stapf
- Pogonatherum P.Beauv.
- Pogonochloa C.E.Hubb.
- Pogononeura Napper
- Pohlidium Davidse, Soderstr. & R.P.Ellis
- Poidium Nees
- Polevansia De Winter
- Polypogon Desf.
- Polytoca R.Br.
- Polytrias Hack.
- Pommereulla Naezén
- Potamophila R.Br.
- Pratochloa Hardion
- Prosphytochloa Schweick.
- Psammagrostis C.A.Gardner & C.E.Hubb. – synonym of Eragrostis Wolf
- Psammochloa Hitchc.
- Psathyrostachys Nevski ex Roshev.
- Pseudanthistiria (Hack.) Hook.f.
- Pseudechinolaena Stapf
- Pseudobambusa T.Q.Nguyen
- Pseudobromus K.Schum.
- Pseudodanthonia Bor & C.E.Hubb.
- Pseudodichanthium Bor
- Pseudoeriocoma Romasch., P.M.Peterson & Soreng
- Pseudolasiacis (A.Camus) A.Camus
- Pseudopentameris Conert
- Pseudophleum Dogan
- Pseudopogonatherum A.Camus
- Pseudoraphis Griff. ex Pilg.
- Pseudoroegneria (Nevski) Á.Löve
- Pseudosasa Makino ex Nakai
- Pseudosorghum A.Camus
- Pseudostachyum Munro
- Pseudotrachys M.Anil Kumar & B.R.P.Rao
- Pseudoxytenanthera Soderstr. & R.P.Ellis
- Pseudozoysia Chiov.
- Psilathera Link
- Psilolemma S.M.Phillips
- Ptilagrostiella Romasch., P.M.Peterson & Soreng
- Ptilagrostis Griseb.
- Puccinellia Parl.
- × Pucciphippsia Tzvelev
- Puelia Franch.

=== R ===
- Racemobambos Holttum
- Raddia Bertol.
- Raddiella Swallen
- Ratzeburgia Kunth
- Ravenochloa D.Z.Li & Y.X.Zhang
- Redfieldia Vasey – synonym of Muhlenbergia
- Rehia Fijten
- Reitzia Swallen
- Relchela Steud.
- Renvoizea Zuloaga & Morrone
- Reynaudia Kunth
- Rheochloa Filg., P.M.Peterson & Y.Herrera
- Rhipidocladum McClure
- Rhizocephalus Boiss.
- Rhombolytrum Link
- Rhynchoryza Baill.
- Rhytachne Desv.
- Richardsiella Elffers & Kenn.-O'Byrne
- Rosengurttia L.N.Silva
- Rostraria Trin.
- Rottboellia L.f.
- Rugoloa Zuloaga
- Ruhooglandia S.Dransf. & K.M.Wong
- Rupichloa Salariato & Morrone
- Rytidosperma Steud.

=== S ===
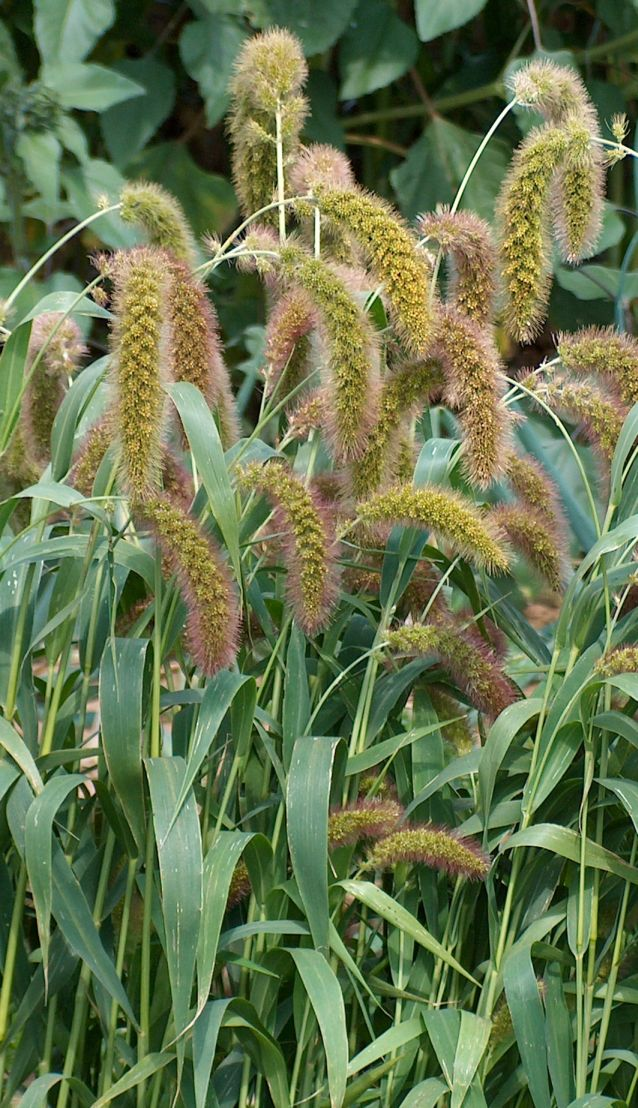
Foxtail millet (Setaria italica, Panicoideae: Paniceae)

- Saccharum L.
- Sacciolepis Nash
- Sarga Ewart
- Sarocalamus Stapleton
- Sartidia De Winter
- Sasa Makino & Shibata
- Sasaella Makino
- Sasamorpha Nakai
- Saugetia Hitchc. & Chase – synonym of Tetrapogon
- Saxipoa Soreng, L.J.Gillespie & S.W.L.Jacobs
- Schenckochloa J.J.Ortíz
- Schismus P.Beauv.
- Schizachne Hack.
- Schizachyrium Nees
- Schizostachyum Nees
- Schmidiella Veldkamp
- Schmidtia Steud. ex J.A.Schmidt
- Schoenefeldia Kunth
- Schoenefeldiella P.M.Peterson
- Sclerochloa P.Beauv.
- Sclerodactylon Stapf
- Scleropogon Phil.
- Scolochloa Link
- Scrotochloa Judz.
- Scutachne Hitchc. & Chase
- Secale L.
- Sehima Forssk.
- Semiarundinaria Makino ex Nakai
- Sesleria Scop.
- Sesleriella Deyl
- Setaria P.Beauv.
- Setariopsis Scribn. ex Millsp.
- Shibataea Makino ex Nakai
- Sibirotrisetum Barberá, Soreng, Romasch., Quintanar & P.M.Peterson
- Silentvalleya V.J.Nair, Sreek., Vajr. & Bhargavan
- Simonachne E.J.Thomps.
- Simplicia Kirk
- Sinobambusa Makino ex Nakai
- Sinochasea Keng
- Sinosasa L.C.Chia ex N.H.Xia, Q.M.Qin & Y.H.Tong
- Sirochloa S.Dransf.
- Snowdenia C.E.Hubb.
- Soejatmia K.M.Wong
- Sohnsia Airy Shaw
- Sokinochloa S.Dransf.
- Sorghastrum Nash
- Sorghum Moench
- Spartina Schreb. – synonym of Sporobolus
- Spartochloa C.E.Hubb.
- Spathia Ewart
- Sphaerobambos S.Dransf.
- Sphaerocaryum Nees ex Hook.f.
- Spheneria Kuhlm.
- Sphenopholis Scribn.
- Sphenopus Trin.
- Spinifex L.
- Spodiopogon Trin.
- Sporobolus R.Br.
- Stapfochloa H.Scholz
- Stapletonia P.Singh, S.S.Dash & P.Kumari
- Steinchisma Raf.
- Steirachne Ekman
- Stelanemia C.D.Tyrrell, L.G.Clark, P.L.Viana & Santos-Gonç.
- Stenostachys Turcz.
- Stenotaphrum Trin.
- Stephanachne Keng
- Stephostachys Zuloaga & Morrone
- Stereochlaena Hack
- Steyermarkochloa Davidse & R.P.Ellis
- Stiburus Stapf
- Stipa L.
- Stipagrostis Nees
- Stipellula Röser & Hamasha
- Stolonochloa E.J.Thomps.
- Streptochaeta Schrad. ex Nees
- Streptogyna P.Beauv.
- Streptolophus Hughes
- Streptostachys Desv.
- Styppeiochloa De Winter
- Sucrea Soderstr.
- Suddia Renvoize
- Swallenia Soderstr. & H.F.Decker
- Sylvipoa Soreng, L.J.Gillespie & S.W.L.Jacobs

=== T ===
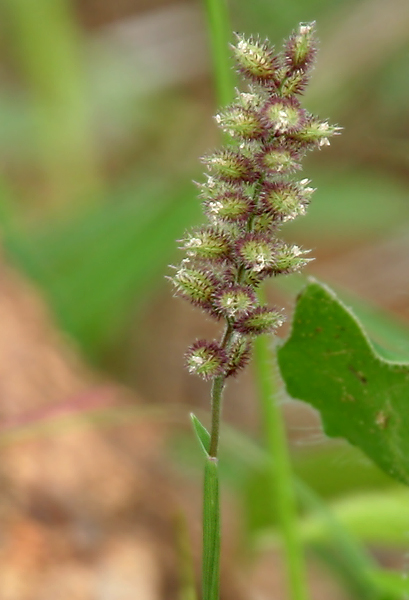
Inflorescence of Tragus roxburghieae, a C_{4} grass in subfamily Chloridoideae

- Taeniatherum Nevski
- Taeniorhachis Cope
- Taquara I.L.C.Oliveira & R.P.Oliveira
- Tarigidia Stent
- Tatianyx Zuloaga & Soderstr.
- Temburongia S.Dransf. & K.M.Wong
- Temochloa S.Dransf.
- Tenaxia N.P.Barker & H.P.Linder
- Tetrachaete Chiov. ex P.R.Pirotta
- Tetrachne Nees
- Tetrapogon Desf.
- Tetrarrhena R.Br.
- Thamnocalamus Munro
- Thaumastochloa C.E.Hubb.
- Thedachloa S.W.L.Jacobs
- Thelepogon Roth
- Themeda Forssk.
- × Thinoelymus Banfi (Elymus × Thinopyrum)
- × Thinoleymus Su Liu & Bing Liu (Leymus × Thinopyrum)
- Thinopyrum Á.Löve
- Thorneochloa Romasch., P.M.Peterson & Soreng
- Thuarea Pers.
- Thyridachne C.E.Hubb.
- Thyridolepis S.T.Blake
- Thyrsia Stapf
- × Thyrsocalamus Sungkaew & W.L.Goh (Dendrocalamus × Thyrsostachys)
- Thyrsostachys Gamble
- Thysanolaena Nees
- Tibisia C.D.Tyrrell, Londoño & L.G.Clark
- Timouria Roshev.
- Tongpeia Stapleton
- Torreyochloa Church
- Trachypogon Nees
- Trachys Pers.
- Tragus Haller
- Tribolium Desv.
- Trichanthecium Zuloaga & Morrone
- Tricholaena Schrad.
- Tricholemma (Röser) Röser
- Trichoneura Andersson
- Trichopteryx Nees
- Tridens Roem. & Schult.
- Tridentopsis P.M.Peterson
- Trigonochloa P.M.Peterson & N.Snow
- Trikeraia Bor
- Trilobachne Schenck ex Henrard
- Triniochloa Hitchc.
- Triodia R.Br.
- Tripidium H.Scholz
- Triplachne Link
- Triplasiella P.M.Peterson & Romasch.
- Triplasis P.Beauv.
- Triplopogon Bor
- Tripogon Roem. & Schult.
- Tripogonella P.M.Peterson & Romasch.
- Tripsacum L.
- Triraphis R.Br.
- Triscenia Griseb.
- Trisetaria Forssk.
- Trisetopsis Röser & A.Wölk
- × Trisetopsotrichon Röser & A.Wölk (Helictotrichon × Trisetopsis)
- Trisetum Pers.
- Tristachya Nees.
- Triticum L.
- Tuctoria Reeder
- Tzveleviochloa Röser & A.Wölk

=== U ===
- Uniola L.
- Uranthoecium Stapf
- Urelytrum Hack.
- Urochloa P.Beauv.
- Urochondra C.E.Hubb.

=== V ===
- Vahlodea Fr.
- Valiha S.Dransf.
- Vaseyochloa Hitchc.
- Veldkampia Ibaragi & Shiro Kobay.
- Ventenata Koeler
- Vietnamocalamus T.Q.Nguyen
- Vietnamochloa Veldkamp & R.Nowack
- Vietnamosasa T.Q.Nguyen
- Viguierella A.Camus
- Vossia Wall. & Griff.
- Vulpia C.C.Gmel. – synonym of Festuca
- Vulpiella (Batt. & Trab.) Burollet

=== W ===
- Walwhalleya Wills & J.J.Bruhl
- Wangenheimia Moench
- Whiteochloa C.E.Hubb.
- Widjajachloa K.M.Wong & S.Dransf.
- Willkommia Hack.

=== X, Y ===
- Xerochloa R.Br.
- Yersinochloa H.N.Nguyen & V.T.Tran
- Yakirra Lazarides & R.D.Webster – synonym of Panicum
- Yushania Keng f.
- Yvesia A.Camus

=== Z ===
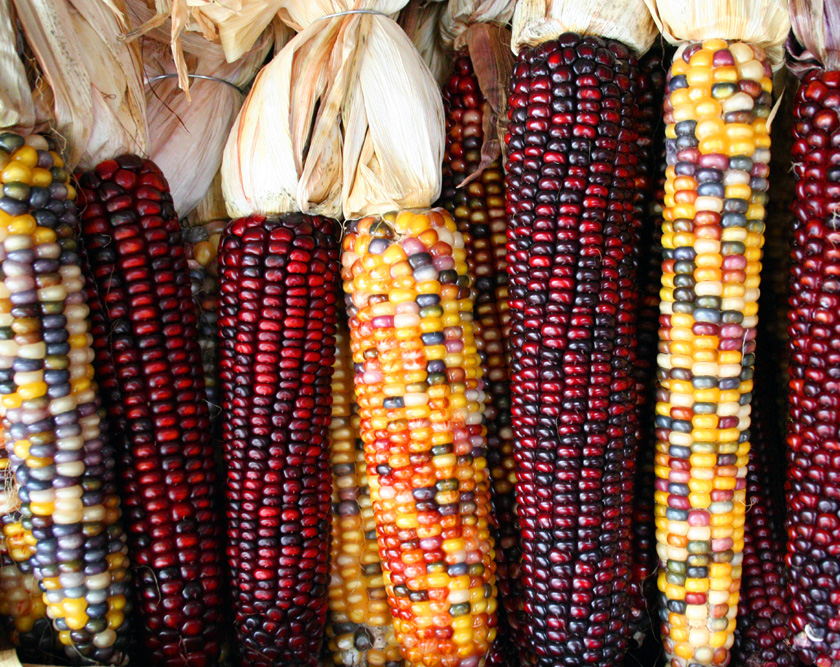
Cultivated varieties of maize or corn (Zea mays, Panicoideae: Andropogoneae)

- Zaqiqah P.M.Peterson & Romasch.
- Zea L.
- Zenkeria Trin.
- Zeugites P.Browne
- Zingeria P.A.Smirn. – synonym of Colpodium
- Zizania L.
- Zizaniopsis Döll & Asch.
- Zonotriche (C.E.Hubb.) J.B.Phipps
- Zotovia Edgar & Connor
- Zoysia Willd.
- Zuloagaea Bess
- Zygochloa S.T.Blake
