= Cryptochloris (disambiguation) =

Cryptochloris is a genus of golden moles.

Cryptochloris may also refer to:

- Cryptochloris, a grass genus, treated as a synonym of Tetrapogon
- Cryptochloris (cryptomonad), a genus in the family Cryptomonadaceae
