= × Aegilotriticum erebunii =

Scientific classification
- Kingdom: Plantae
- Clade: Embryophytes
- Clade: Tracheophytes
- Clade: Spermatophytes
- Clade: Angiosperms
- Clade: Monocots
- Clade: Commelinids
- Order: Poales
- Family: Poaceae
- Subfamily: Pooideae
- Genus: × Aegilotriticum
- Species: × A. erebunii

Binomial name
- × Aegilotriticum erebunii (Gandilyan) van Slageren

Synonyms
- Triticum erebuni Gandilyan

Hybrid species of grass

× Aegilotriticum erebunii is a herbaceous flowering plant in the grass family. It is a natural hybrid which has been found in Armenia in the Caucasus.

== Taxonomy ==
This nothospecies was first described as a species, Triticum erebuni, in 1984 by P.A. Gandilyan in the bulletin of the Vavilov Institute, but in a 1994 paper published by Wageningen University, Michiel van Slageren identified it as an intergeneric hybrid, and moved the taxon to × Aegilotriticum.
