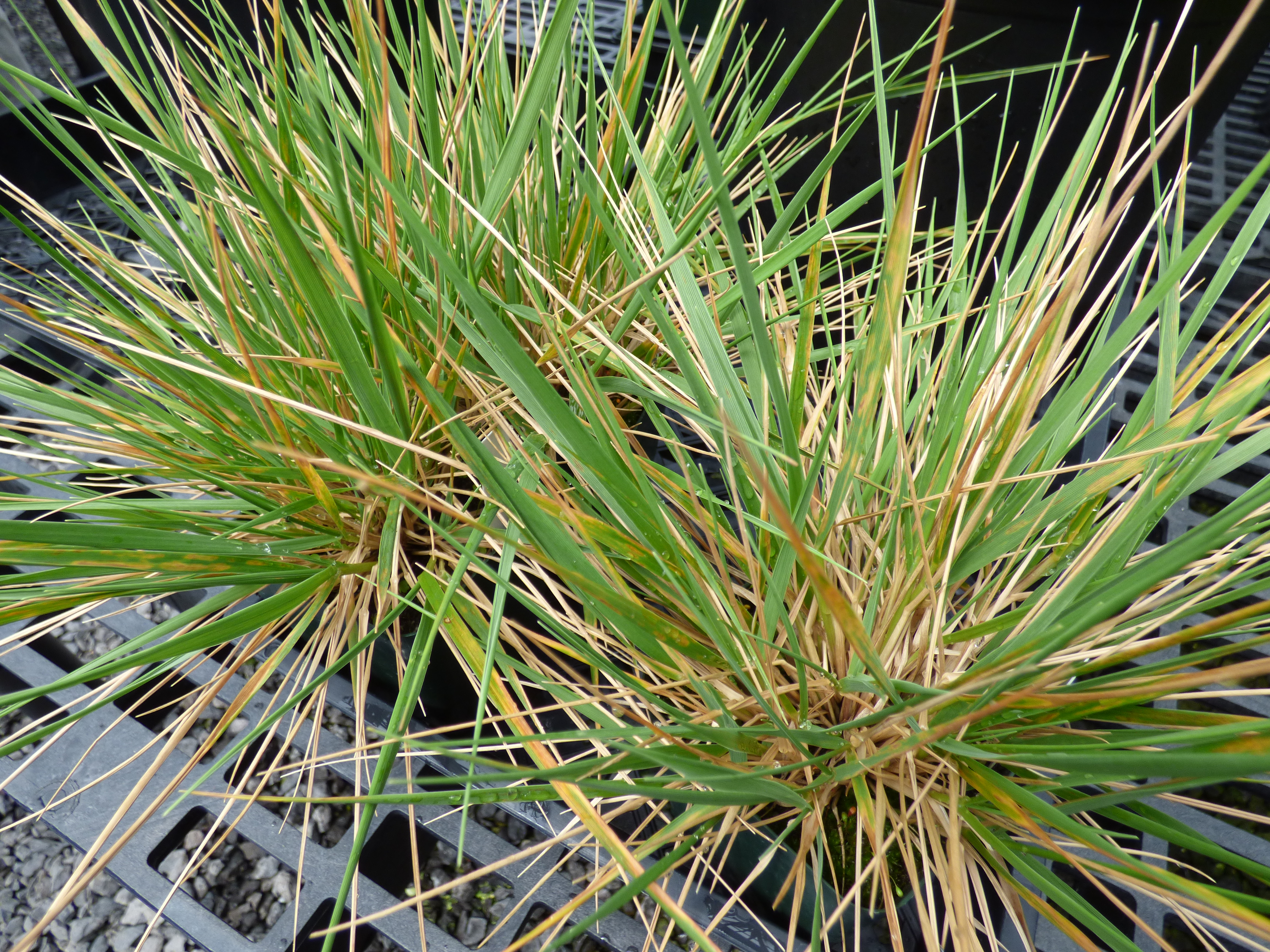

Conservation status
- Vulnerable (IUCN 3.1)

Scientific classification
- Kingdom: Plantae
- Clade: Tracheophytes
- Clade: Angiosperms
- Clade: Monocots
- Clade: Commelinids
- Order: Poales
- Family: Poaceae
- Subfamily: Pooideae
- Genus: Greeneochloa
- Species: G. expansa

Binomial name
- Greeneochloa expansa (G.Munro ex Hillebr.) P.M.Peterson, Romasch. & Soreng

Synonyms
- Calamagrostis expansa (Munro ex Hillebr.) Hitchc.; Deyeuxia expansa (Munro ex Hillebr.

= Greeneochloa expansa =

Species of grass

Greeneochloa expansa is a species of grass in the family Poaceae known by the common name Maui reedgrass. It is native to Hawaii, where it is known only from Maui and the island of Hawaiʻi. Its natural habitats are lowland moist forests and swamps. It is threatened by habitat loss.
