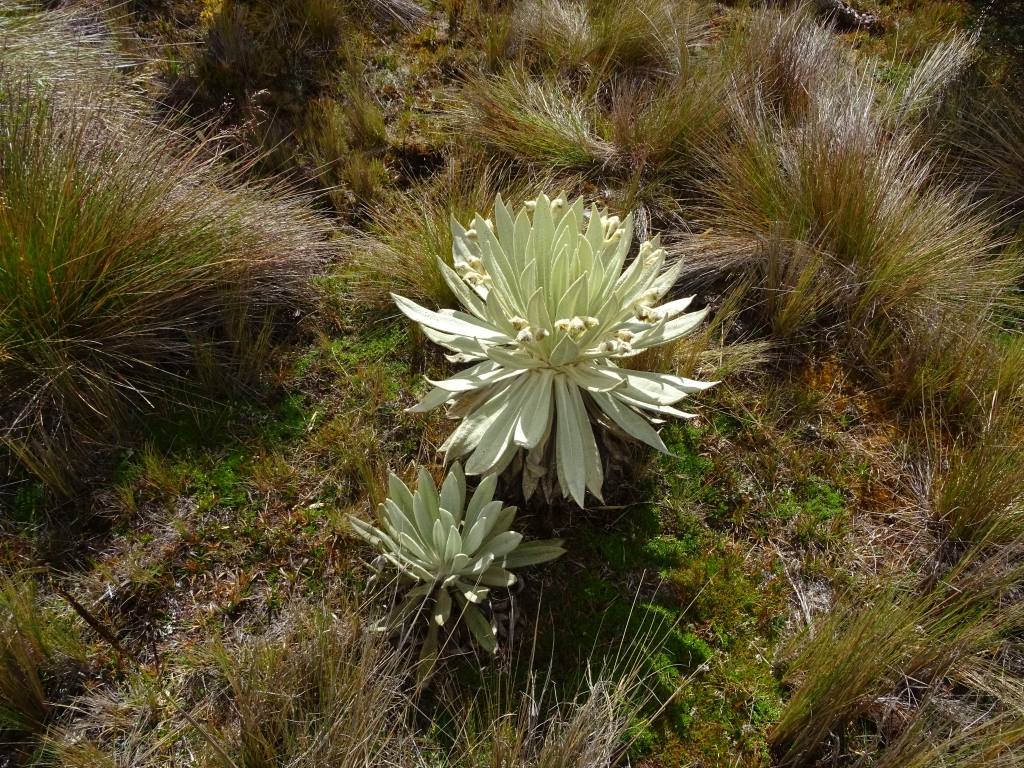
- Paramochloa effusa growing around Espeletia sp. in the Ocetá Páramo, Boyacá, Colombia

Scientific classification
- Kingdom: Plantae
- Clade: Tracheophytes
- Clade: Angiosperms
- Clade: Monocots
- Clade: Commelinids
- Order: Poales
- Family: Poaceae
- Subfamily: Pooideae
- Tribe: Poeae
- Subtribe: Paramochloinae
- Genus: Paramochloa
- Species: P. effusa

Binomial name
- Paramochloa effusa (Kunth) P.M.Peterson, Soreng, Romasch. & Barberá

Synonyms
- Arundo effusa (Kunth) Poir., nom. illeg.; Calamagrostis areantha (Pilg.) Pilg.; Calamagrostis effusa (Kunth) Steud., nom. illeg.; Calamagrostis funckii Steud.; Deyeuxia araeantha Pilg.; Deyeuxia effusa Kunth (basionym); Deyeuxia funckii (Steud.) Wedd.; Deyeuxia spathacea Clarion ex Steud., pro syn.

= Paramochloa effusa =

Species of grass

Paramochloa effusa is a species of grass, known locally as paja blanca, carrizo, and espartillo. It is a perennial native the mountains of Colombia, Venezuela, and Ecuador, including the northern Andes and the Sierra Nevada de Santa Marta. It grows in upper montane forest, woodland and savanna, and in subalpine and alpine páramo shrubland and grassland, from 2500 to 4500 meters elevation.

It is used for basketry and other crafts, and for thatch roofing.
