= Chandrasekharania =

Scientific classification
- Kingdom: Plantae
- Clade: Tracheophytes
- Clade: Angiosperms
- Clade: Monocots
- Clade: Commelinids
- Order: Poales
- Family: Poaceae
- Subfamily: Panicoideae
- Tribe: incertae sedis
- Genus: Chandrasekharania; V.J.Nair, V.S.Ramach. & Sreek.
- Species: C. keralensis

Binomial name
- Chandrasekharania keralensis V.J.Nair, V.S.Ramach. & Sreek.

Genus of grasses

Chandrasekharania is a genus of Indian plants in the grass family.

The only known species is Chandrasekharania keralensis, native to the State of Kerala in southern India.

The genus name of Chandrasekharania is in honour of Narayana Pillai Chandrasekharan Nair (b.1927), who was an Indian botanist (mycology) and teacher.

"The genus is named after Dr N. Chandrasekharan Nair, the first author's teacher and present Joint Director, Botanical Survey of India, Coimbatore, in recognition of his outstanding contributions to Indian botany."

The genus was circumscribed by Velukutty Jayachandran Nair, Veerambakkam Srinivasan Ramachandran and Puthenpurayil Viswanathan Sreekumar in Proc. Indian. Acad. Sci. vol.91 (Issue 2) on page 79 in 1982.

== See also ==
- List of Poaceae genera
