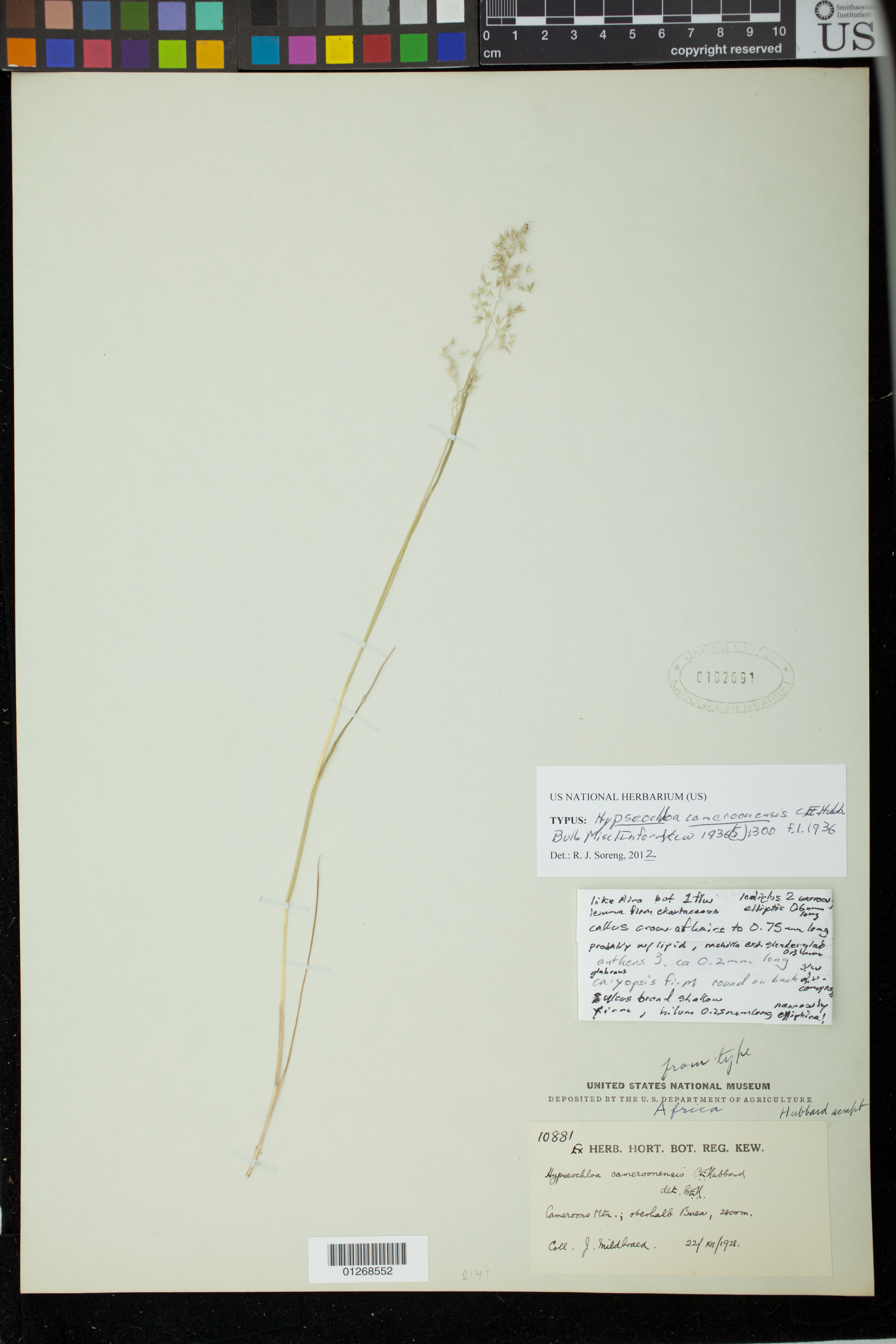

Conservation status
- Vulnerable (IUCN 2.3)

Scientific classification
- Kingdom: Plantae
- Clade: Tracheophytes
- Clade: Angiosperms
- Clade: Monocots
- Clade: Commelinids
- Order: Poales
- Family: Poaceae
- Subfamily: Pooideae
- Genus: Hypseochloa
- Species: H. cameroonensis

Binomial name
- Hypseochloa cameroonensis C.E.Hubbard

= Hypseochloa cameroonensis =

Species of grass

Hypseochloa cameroonensis is a species of grass in the family Poaceae. It is found only in Cameroon. Its natural habitat is subtropical or tropical dry lowland grassland.
