= Alloeochaete =

Scientific classification
- Kingdom: Plantae
- Clade: Tracheophytes
- Clade: Angiosperms
- Clade: Monocots
- Clade: Commelinids
- Order: Poales
- Family: Poaceae
- Subfamily: Panicoideae
- Genus: Alloeochaete; C.E.Hubb.

Type species
- Alloeochaete andongensis (Rendle) C.E.Hubb.

Genus of plants

Alloeochaete is a genus of African plants in the grass family.

Species

- Alloeochaete andongensis (Rendle) C.E.Hubb. - Angola
- Alloeochaete geniculata Kabuye - Malawi
- Alloeochaete gracillima Kabuye - Malawi
- Alloeochaete namuliensis Chippind. - Mozambique
- * Alloeochaete oreogena Launert - Malawi
- Alloeochaete ulugurensis Kabuye - Tanzania

Endangered species labelled with an asterisk (*)

== See also ==
- List of Poaceae genera
