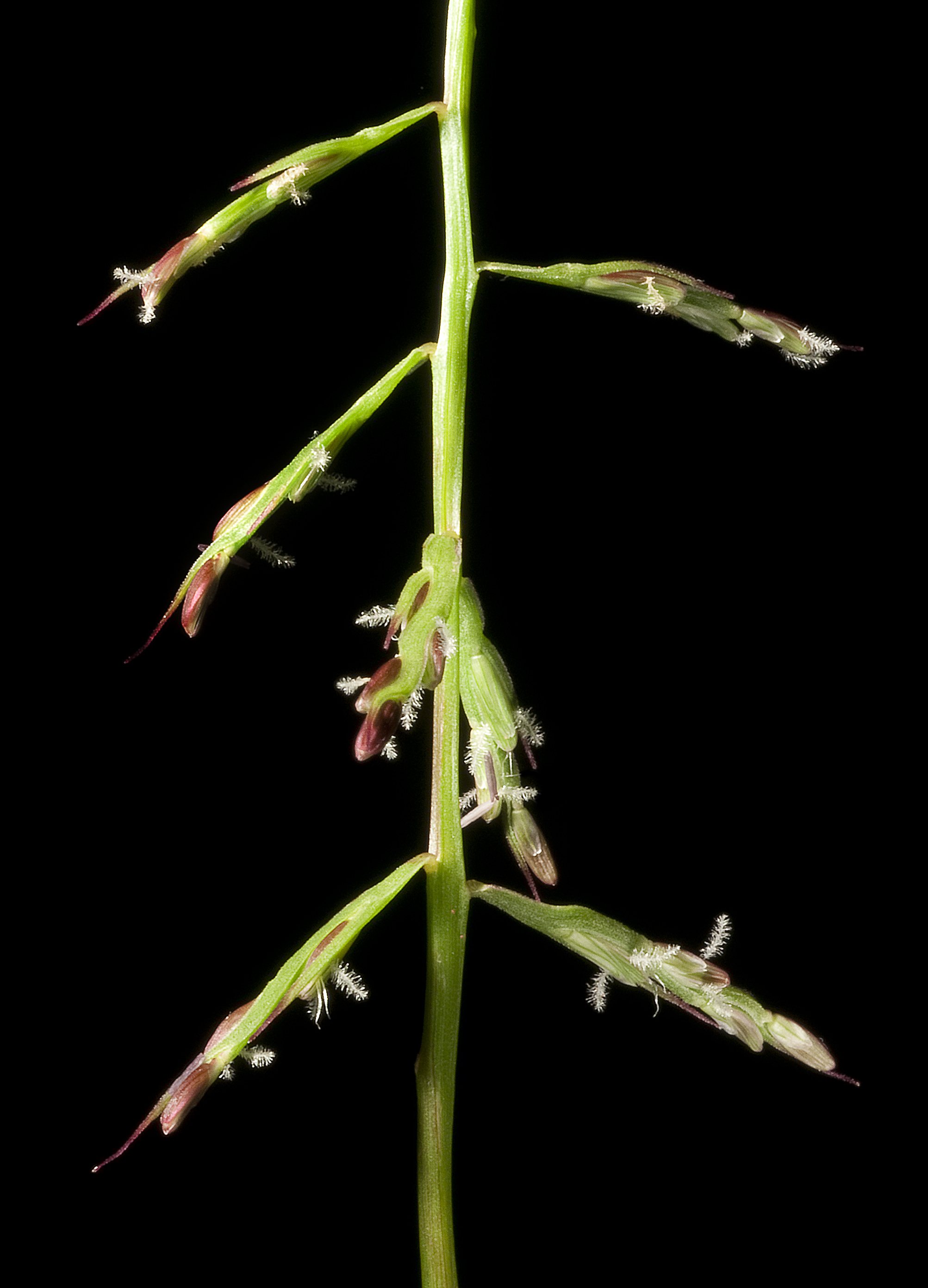

Scientific classification
- Kingdom: Plantae
- Clade: Tracheophytes
- Clade: Angiosperms
- Clade: Monocots
- Clade: Commelinids
- Order: Poales
- Family: Poaceae
- Subfamily: Panicoideae
- Genus: Paractaenum
- Species: P. novae-hollandiae

Binomial name
- Paractaenum novae-hollandiae (P.Beauv.)

Synonyms
- Panicum novae-hollandiae (P.Beauv.) Desv. Panicum reversum F.Muell. Paractaenum novae-hollandiae subsp. reversum (F.Muell.) R.D.Webster.

= Paractaenum novae-hollandiae =

Species of plant

Paractaenum novae-hollandiae (common name - reflexed panic grass) is a grass (family Poaceae), native to Western Australia. It is an annual herb growing from 0.2 to 0.5 m high, on sands and loams. Its green-purple flowers may be seen from March to September.

It was first described in 1812 by Palisot de Beauvois, and is the type species of the genus.
