= Pogononeura =

Scientific classification
- Kingdom: Plantae
- Clade: Tracheophytes
- Clade: Angiosperms
- Clade: Monocots
- Clade: Commelinids
- Order: Poales
- Family: Poaceae
- Subfamily: Chloridoideae
- Tribe: Cynodonteae
- Subtribe: Traginae
- Genus: Pogononeura; Napper
- Species: P. biflora

Binomial name
- Pogononeura biflora Napper

Synonyms
- Pogoneura biflora Napper, alternate spelling; Pogoneura Napper, alternate spelling

Genus of grasses

Pogononeura is a genus of plants in the grass family. The only known species is Pogononeura biflora, native to Uganda and Tanzania.
