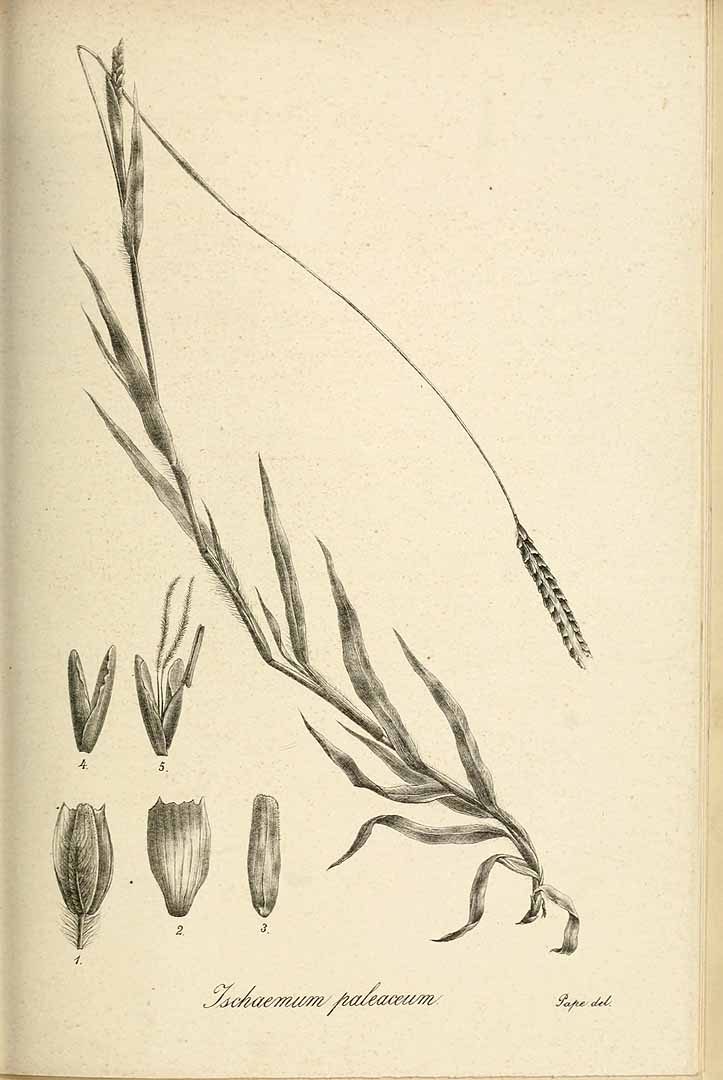
- Apocopis paleacea

Scientific classification
- Kingdom: Plantae
- Clade: Tracheophytes
- Clade: Angiosperms
- Clade: Monocots
- Clade: Commelinids
- Order: Poales
- Family: Poaceae
- Subfamily: Panicoideae
- Supertribe: Andropogonodae
- Tribe: Andropogoneae
- Subtribe: Germainiinae
- Genus: Apocopis; Nees

Type species
- Apocopis royleana (syn of A. paleacea) Nees

Synonyms
- Amblyachyrum Hochst. ex Steud.

= Apocopis =

Genus of grasses

Apocopis is a genus of Asian plants in the grass family, widespread in China, the Indian subcontinent, and Southeast Asia, including several species endemic to Myanmar (Burma).

Species

- Apocopis anomala Bor - Myanmar
- Apocopis breviglumis Keng & S.L.Chen - Sichuan, Yunnan
- Apocopis burmanica V.Naray. ex Bor - Myanmar
- Apocopis cochinchinensis A.Camus - Myanmar, Thailand, Vietnam
- Apocopis collina Balansa - Thailand, Vietnam, Borneo, Sulawesi, Sumatra
- Apocopis courtallumensis (Steud.) Henrard - - Thailand, Vietnam, India, Sri Lanka
- Apocopis floccosa Bor - Myanmar
- Apocopis intermedia (A.Camus) Chai-Anan - China, Indochina
- Apocopis mangalorensis (Hochst. ex Steud.) Henrard - India, Sri Lanka, Myanmar
- Apocopis paleacea (Trin.) Hochr. - China, Himalayas, Indochina, Pen Malaysia
- Apocopis peguensis Bor - Myanmar
- Apocopis pulcherrima Bor - Myanmar
- Apocopis schmidiana A.Camus - Vietnam, Cambodia
- Apocopis siamensis A.Camus - Thailand
- Apocopis vaginata Hack. - Himalayas, Myanmar
- Apocopis wrightii Munro - China, Indochina

Formerly included

see Dichanthium Lophopogon

- Apocopis pallida - Dichanthium caricosum
- Apocopis tridentata - Lophopogon tridentatus

== See also ==
- List of Poaceae genera
