= Stereochlaena =

Scientific classification
- Kingdom: Plantae
- Clade: Tracheophytes
- Clade: Angiosperms
- Clade: Monocots
- Clade: Commelinids
- Order: Poales
- Family: Poaceae
- Subfamily: Panicoideae
- Supertribe: Panicodae
- Tribe: Paniceae
- Subtribe: Cenchrinae
- Genus: Stereochlaena; Hack.

Type species
- Stereochlaena jeffreysii (syn of S. cameronii) Hack.

Synonyms
- Chloridion Stapf 1901, illegitimate homonym not Link 1824

Genus of grasses

Stereochlaena is a genus of African plants in the grass family.

Species

- Stereochlaena annua Clayton - Tanzania
- Stereochlaena caespitosa Clayton - Tanzania, Malawi
- Stereochlaena cameronii (Stapf) Pilg. - Tanzania, Malawi, Zambia, Zimbabwe, Angola, Mozambique, Botswana, Limpopo
- Stereochlaena tridentata Clayton - Tanzania

formerly included

see Baptorhachis

- Stereochlaena foliacea - Baptorhachis foliacea
