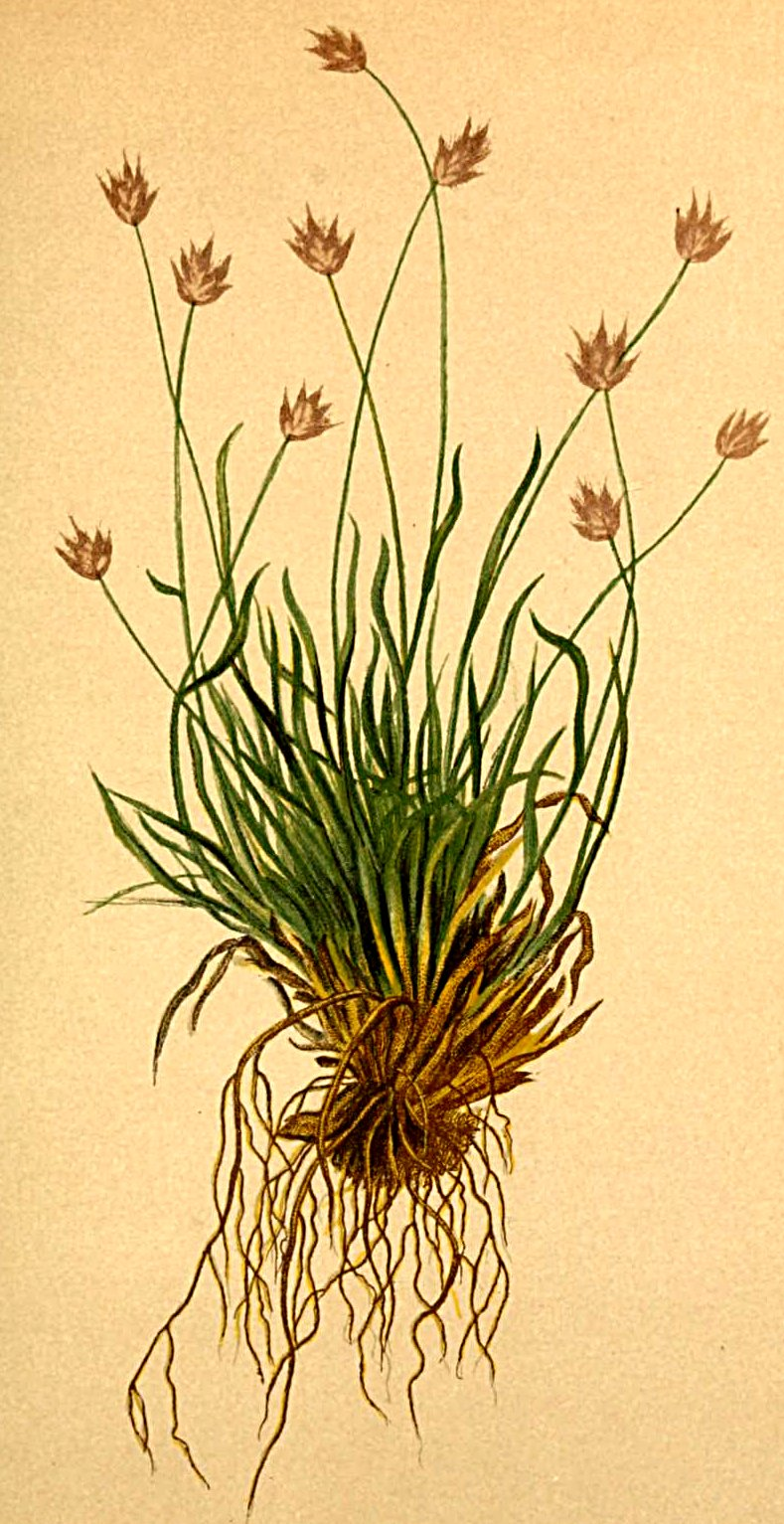

Scientific classification
- Kingdom: Plantae
- Clade: Tracheophytes
- Clade: Angiosperms
- Clade: Monocots
- Clade: Commelinids
- Order: Poales
- Family: Poaceae
- Subfamily: Pooideae
- Genus: Psilathera; Link (1827)
- Species: P. ovata

Binomial name
- Psilathera ovata (Hoppe) Deyl (1946)

Synonyms
- Cynosurus capitatus Wulfen ex Roem. & Schult. (1817), pro syn.; Cynosurus macrocephalus Link (1829); Cynosurus microcephalus Hoffm. (1800); Cynosurus ovatus Hoppe (1799); Psilathera tenella (Host) Link (1827); Sesleria microcephala (Hoffm.) DC. (1805); Sesleria ovata (Hoppe) A.Kern. (1881); Sesleria tenella Host (1802)

= Psilathera =

Genus of grasses

Psilathera is a genus of grasses. It includes a single species, Psilathera ovata, a perennial native to the Alps of Austria, France, Germany, Italy, and Slovenia.
