= Brachystachyum =

Scientific classification
- Kingdom: Plantae
- Clade: Tracheophytes
- Clade: Angiosperms
- Clade: Monocots
- Clade: Commelinids
- Order: Poales
- Family: Poaceae
- Clade: BOP clade
- Subfamily: Bambusoideae
- Genus: Brachystachyum; Keng

Genus of bamboo

Brachystachyum is a genus of bamboo. It includes two species native to southern China.

- Brachystachyum albostriatum G.H.Lai
- Brachystachyum densiflorum (Rendle) Keng
