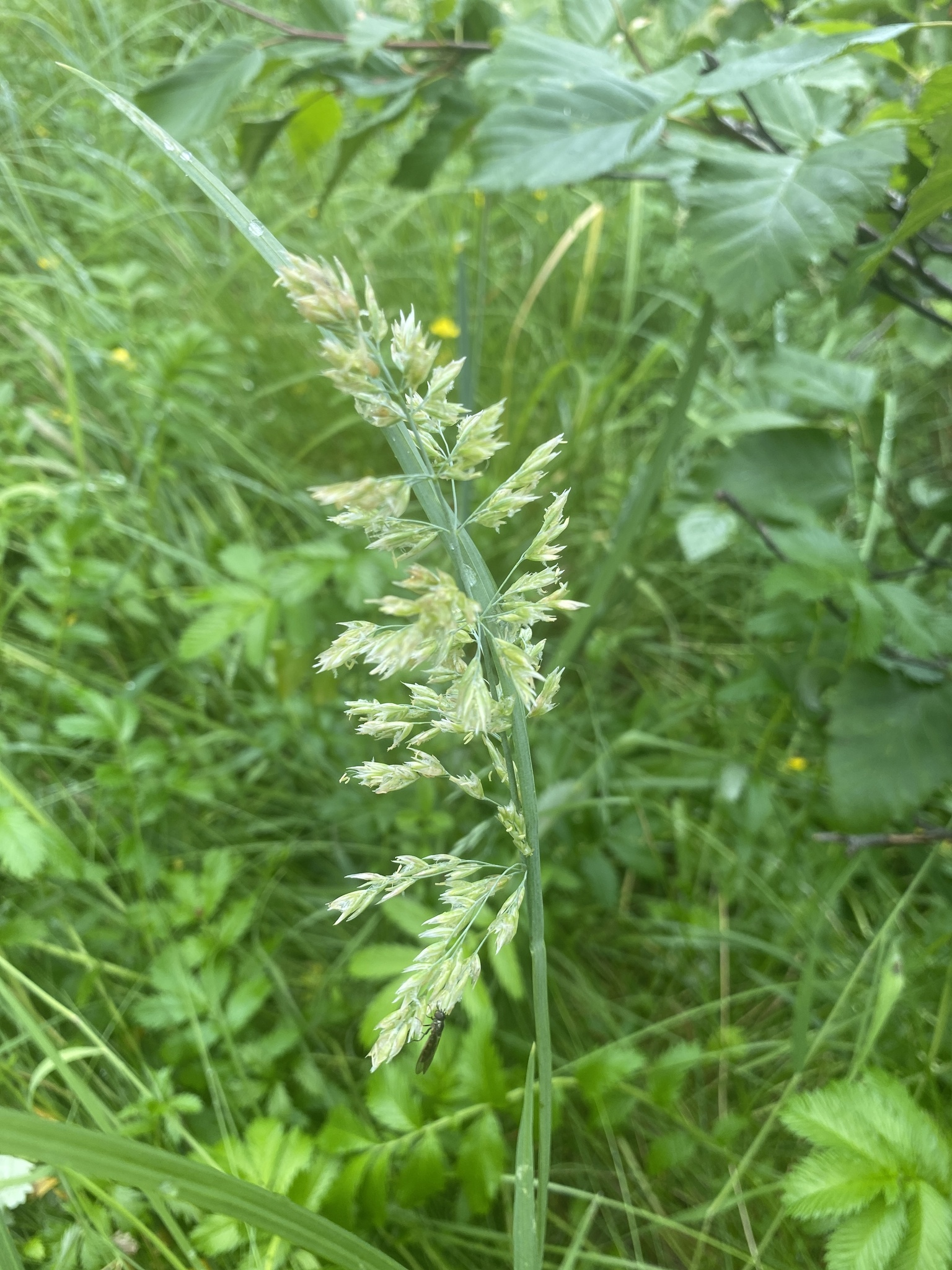
- Arctopoa eminens

Scientific classification
- Kingdom: Plantae
- Clade: Tracheophytes
- Clade: Angiosperms
- Clade: Monocots
- Clade: Commelinids
- Order: Poales
- Family: Poaceae
- Subfamily: Pooideae
- Supertribe: Poodae
- Tribe: Poeae
- Subtribe: Poinae
- Genus: Arctopoa (Griseb.) Prob.

= Arctopoa =

Genus of grasses

Arctopoa is a genus of grasses. It includes eight species native to subarctic and temperate Asia and northwestern and northeastern North America.

== Species ==
Eight species are accepted.

- Arctopoa eminens (J.Presl) Prob.
- Arctopoa petrovskyi Prob.
- Arctopoa reventa Prob.
- Arctopoa saltuensis (Fernald & Wiegand) D.L.Fu
- Arctopoa schischkinii (Tzvelev) Prob.
- Arctopoa subfastigiata (Trin.) Prob.
- Arctopoa tibetica (Munro ex Stapf) Prob.
- Arctopoa trautvetteri (Tzvelev) Prob.
