= Stolonochloa =

Scientific classification
- Kingdom: Plantae
- Clade: Tracheophytes
- Clade: Angiosperms
- Clade: Monocots
- Clade: Commelinids
- Order: Poales
- Family: Poaceae
- Subfamily: Panicoideae
- Supertribe: Panicodae
- Tribe: Paniceae
- Subtribe: Boivinellinae
- Genus: Stolonochloa; E.J.Thomps.

Type species
- Stolonochloa pygmaea (R.Br.) E.J.Thomps.

Genus of grasses

Stolonochloa is a genus of grasses. It includes two species native to Queensland and New South Wales in eastern Australia.

- Stolonochloa lachnophylla (Benth.) E.J.Thomps.
- Stolonochloa pygmaea (R.Br.) E.J.Thomps.

The genus name is derived from the Latin stolon 'shoot, sucker', after both species' horizontal growth habit of runners rooting at the nodes, and from the Greek chloe for 'young green corn or grass'.
