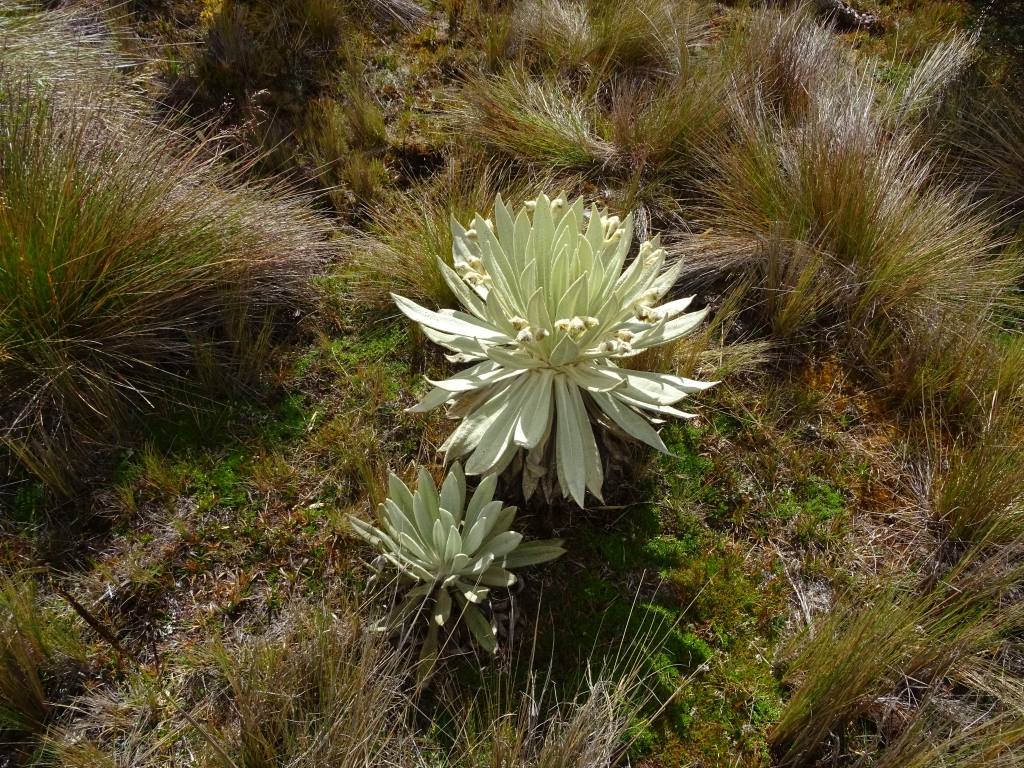
- Paramochloa effusa growing around Espeletia sp. in the Ocetá Páramo, Boyacá, Colombia

Scientific classification
- Kingdom: Plantae
- Clade: Tracheophytes
- Clade: Angiosperms
- Clade: Monocots
- Clade: Commelinids
- Order: Poales
- Family: Poaceae
- Subfamily: Pooideae
- Tribe: Poeae
- Subtribe: Paramochloinae
- Genus: Paramochloa; P.M.Peterson, Soreng, Romasch. & Barberá

Species
- Paramochloa crispifolia (Sylvester) P.M.Peterson, Soreng, Romasch. & Barberá; Paramochloa effusa (Kunth) P.M.Peterson, Soreng, Romasch. & Barberá

= Paramochloa =

Genus of grasses

Paramochloa is a genus of grasses. It includes two species of montane perennials native to the northern Andes of Colombia, Ecuador, and Venezuela.

- Paramochloa crispifolia (Sylvester) P.M.Peterson, Soreng, Romasch. & Barberá – Colombia and Venezuela
- Paramochloa effusa (Kunth) P.M.Peterson, Soreng, Romasch. & Barberá – Venezuela, Colombia, and Ecuador
