= D. M. Napper =

English botanist (1930–1972)

Diana Margaret Napper, who published as D. M. Napper, (23 August 1930, Woking – 31 March 1972, London) was an English botanist, specializing in the systematic botany of East Africa, particularly grasses. She worked at the Coffee Research Station in Ruiru and then transferred to the East African Herbarium in Nairobi. After returning to England, she was for a short time on the staff of the Kew Herbarium.

== Life ==
Diana Margaret Napper was born on 23 August 1930, in Woking in Surrey. Her father died when she was seven, and she was brought up mostly by her mother. She attended Oldfield School in Swanage, Michael Hall, in Forest Row, Sussex and Bournemouth Municipal College. It was at Bournemouth College that her interest in botany began. She won a county bursary, and was educated at the University of Exeter, graduating with a B.Sc. in botany in 1953. She had won the university's Franklin and Tucker prize in 1951.

In 1954 she started working for the Department of Agriculture in Kenya, starting at the Coffee Research Station in Ruiru. In 1955 she transferred to the East African Herbarium in Nairobi. After returning to England, she was for a short time on the staff of the Kew Herbarium. She studied the families Acanthaceae, Cyperaceae, and Gramineae of East Africa.

Napper died at the age of 41 on 31 March 1972 in London. From May 1971 she had undergone a series of colon operations, and despite attempting to convalesce on the Isle of Wight, did not recover from the second series of operations the following year.

== Works ==
- (with K. W. Harker) An illustrated guide to the grasses of Uganda, 1960
- Grasses of Tanganyika: with keys for identification, 1965
