= Aemulanthus =

Scientific classification
- Kingdom: Plantae
- Clade: Tracheophytes
- Clade: Angiosperms
- Clade: Monocots
- Clade: Commelinids
- Order: Poales
- Family: Poaceae
- Tribe: Olyreae
- Subtribe: Parianinae
- Genus: Aemulanthus; R.P.Oliveira & F.M.Ferreira
- Species: A. decumbens

Binomial name
- Aemulanthus decumbens R.P.Oliveira & F.M.Ferreira

Genus of bamboo

Aemulanthus is a genus of bamboo. It includes a single species, Aemulanthus decumbens, which is endemic to Espírito Santo state in southeastern Brazil.
