= Cinnastrum =

Scientific classification
- Kingdom: Plantae
- Clade: Tracheophytes
- Clade: Angiosperms
- Clade: Monocots
- Clade: Commelinids
- Order: Poales
- Family: Poaceae
- Subfamily: Pooideae
- Genus: Cinnastrum (Kunth) E.Fourn.
- Species: C. poiforme

Binomial name
- Cinnastrum poiforme E.Fourn.

Synonyms
- Synonymy: Agrostis poiformis Willd. ex Steud. (1840), pro syn.; Arundo pooides Poir. (1816); Calamagrostis poiformis (Kunth) Beal (1896); Calamagrostis pooides Trin. ex Steud. (1840), pro syn.; Calamovilfa poiformis (Kunth) M.E.Jones (1912); Cinna miliacea Griseb. ex E.Fourn. (1886), pro syn.; Cinna poiformis (Kunth) Scribn. & Merr. (1901); Cinnastrum miliaceum E.Fourn. (1886); Deyeuxia poiformis Kunth (1816) (basionym); Poa subnudiflora Kunth (1829), nom. superfl.; Poa subuniflora Kunth (1829)

Genus of grasses

Cinnastrum is a genus of grasses. It includes a single species, Cinnastrum poiforme, a perennial which ranges from northeastern Mexico to Guatemala and from Costa Rica to Venezuela and Bolivia. In Colombia it grows in the Andes at high elevations (3000 to 4000 meters).
