= Calamtrisetum =

Scientific classification
- Kingdom: Plantae
- Clade: Tracheophytes
- Clade: Angiosperms
- Clade: Monocots
- Clade: Commelinids
- Order: Poales
- Family: Poaceae
- Genus: Calamtrisetum; Charit.
- Species: C. tenuis

Binomial name
- Calamtrisetum tenuis Charit.

Genus of grasses

Calamtrisetum is a genus of grasses. It contains a single species, Calamtrisetum tenuis, a perennial native to western Siberia. Both genus and species were described in 2011 by Boris Stepanovich Charitontcev.
