= Ocellochloa =

Scientific classification
- Kingdom: Plantae
- Clade: Tracheophytes
- Clade: Angiosperms
- Clade: Monocots
- Clade: Commelinids
- Order: Poales
- Family: Poaceae
- Subfamily: Panicoideae
- Supertribe: Panicodae
- Tribe: Paniceae
- Genus: Ocellochloa; Zuloaga & Morrone

Genus of grasses

Ocellochloa is a genus of grasses. It includes 12 species which range from southern Mexico through Central America and tropical South America to northeastern Argentina.

== Species ==
12 species are accepted.

- Ocellochloa andreana (Mez) Zuloaga & Morrone
- Ocellochloa biglandularis (Scribn. & J.G.Sm.) Zuloaga & Morrone
- Ocellochloa brachystachya (Trin.) Zuloaga & Morrone
- Ocellochloa chapadensis (Swallen) Zuloaga & Morrone
- Ocellochloa craterifera (Sohns) Zuloaga & Morrone
- Ocellochloa gardneri (Mez) Filg. & R.S.Rodrigues
- Ocellochloa irregularis (Swallen) Zuloaga & Morrone
- Ocellochloa latissima (J.C.Mikan ex Trin.) Zuloaga & Morrone
- Ocellochloa pulchella (Raddi) Zuloaga & Morrone
- Ocellochloa rudis (Nees) Zuloaga & Morrone
- Ocellochloa soderstromii (Zuloaga & Send.) Zuloaga & Morrone ex Filg. & R.S.Rodrigues
- Ocellochloa stolonifera (Poir.) Zuloaga & Morrone
