= Kengiochloa =

Scientific classification
- Kingdom: Plantae
- Clade: Tracheophytes
- Clade: Angiosperms
- Clade: Monocots
- Clade: Commelinids
- Order: Poales
- Family: Poaceae
- Subfamily: Bambusoideae
- Tribe: Arundinarieae
- Subtribe: Arundinariinae
- Genus: Kengiochloa; Y.H.Tong & N.H.Xia
- Species: K. pubiflora

Binomial name
- Kengiochloa pubiflora (Keng) Y.H.Tong & N.H.Xia

Synonyms
- Acidosasa paucifolia W.T.Lin; Arundinaria pubiflora Keng (1936) (basionym); Arundinaria lanshanensis (T.H.Wen) T.H.Wen; Arundinaria pallidiflora (McClure) T.H.Wen; Arundinaria tenuivagina W.T.Lin & Z.M.Wu; Indocalamus pallidiflorus McClure; Indocalamus pubiflorus (Keng) Keng f.; Pseudosasa pallidiflora (McClure) S.L.Chen & G.Y.Sheng; Pseudosasa parilis T.P.Yi & D.H.Hu; Pseudosasa pubiflora (Keng) Keng f. ex D.Z.Li & L.M.Gao; Yushania lanshanensis T.H.Wen

Genus of flowering plants

Kengiochoa is a genus of bamboo. It includes a single species, Kengiochloa pubiflora, which is native to northern Guangdong, southern Hunan, and southern Jiangxi provinces of southeastern China.
