= Khoonmengia =

Scientific classification
- Kingdom: Plantae
- Clade: Tracheophytes
- Clade: Angiosperms
- Clade: Monocots
- Clade: Commelinids
- Order: Poales
- Family: Poaceae
- Subfamily: Bambusoideae
- Tribe: Arundinarieae
- Subtribe: Arundinariinae
- Genus: Khoonmengia; N.H.Xia, Y.H.Tong & X.R.Zheng
- Species: K. honbaensis

Binomial name
- Khoonmengia honbaensis N.H.Xia, Y.H.Tong & X.R.Zheng

Genus of bamboo

Khoonmengia is a genus of bamboo. It contains a single species, Khoonmengia honbaensis, which is endemic to south-central Vietnam.
