= Greeneochloa =

Scientific classification
- Kingdom: Plantae
- Clade: Tracheophytes
- Clade: Angiosperms
- Clade: Monocots
- Clade: Commelinids
- Order: Poales
- Family: Poaceae
- Subfamily: Pooideae
- Tribe: Poeae
- Subtribe: Echinopogoninae
- Genus: Greeneochloa; P.M.Peterson, Soreng, Romasch. & Barberá

Genus of flowering plants

Greeneochloa is a genus of grasses. It includes three species native to North America and Hawaii. These species were formerly placed in genus Calamagrostis.

Three species are accepted.

- Greeneochloa coarctata (Eaton) P.M.Peterson, Soreng, Romasch. & Barberá – eastern United States
- Greeneochloa expansa (Munro ex Hillebr.) P.M.Peterson, Romasch. & Soreng – Hawaiian Islands
- Greeneochloa tweedyi (Scribn.) P.M.Peterson, Soreng, Romasch. & Barberá – northwestern United States
