= Arctohyalopoa =

Scientific classification
- Kingdom: Plantae
- Clade: Tracheophytes
- Clade: Angiosperms
- Clade: Monocots
- Clade: Commelinids
- Order: Poales
- Family: Poaceae
- Subfamily: Pooideae
- Tribe: Poeae
- Genus: Arctohyalopoa; Röser & Tkach

Species
- A. ivanovae (Malyschev) Röser & Tkach; A. jurtzevii (Prob. & V.V.Petrovsky) Röser & Tkach; A. lanatiflora (Roshev.) Röser & Tkach; A. momica (Tzvelev) Röser & Tkach

Genus of grasses

Arctohyalopoa is a genus of grass in the family Poaceae. It is native to the eastern Russian oblasts of Krasnoyarsk, Sakha, and Zabaykalsky Krai.

== Taxonomy ==
Arctohyalopoa was first described in the scientific journal Taxon by the authors Martin Röser and Natalia Tkach in 2020. The genus Arctohyalopoa consists of four species: A. ivanovae, A. jurtzevii, A. lanatiflora, and A. momica. Its type species is A. lanatiflora, which was originally described as Poa lanatiflora in 1932.
