= Hsuehochloa =

Scientific classification
- Kingdom: Plantae
- Clade: Tracheophytes
- Clade: Angiosperms
- Clade: Monocots
- Clade: Commelinids
- Order: Poales
- Family: Poaceae
- Subfamily: Bambusoideae
- Tribe: Arundinarieae
- Subtribe: Hsuehochloinae; D.Z.Li & Y.X.Zhang
- Genus: Hsuehochloa; D.Z.Li & Y.X.Zhang
- Species: H. calcarea

Binomial name
- Hsuehochloa calcarea (C.D.Chu & C.S.Chao) D.Z.Li & Y.X.Zhang

Synonyms
- Ampelocalamus calcareus C.D.Chu & C.S.Chao

Genus of bamboo

Hsuehochloa is a genus of bamboo. It includes a single species, Hsuehochloa calcarea, which is endemic to southwestern Guizhou Province in southern China.
