= × Elyhordeum =

Scientific classification
- Kingdom: Plantae
- Clade: Embryophytes
- Clade: Tracheophytes
- Clade: Angiosperms
- Clade: Monocots
- Clade: Commelinids
- Order: Poales
- Family: Poaceae
- Subfamily: Pooideae
- Tribe: Triticeae
- Genus: × Elyhordeum; Mansf.

Species
- See text.

Synonyms
- Cockaynea Zotov; × Elymordeum Lepage; × Elytesion Barkworth & D.R.Dewey; × Elytrordeum Hyl.; × Horderoegneria Tzvelev; Rouxia Husn., nom. illeg.; × Sitordeum Bowden

Hybrid genus of flowering plant

× Elyhordeum is a hybrid genus of flowering plant in the grass family Poaceae. Its parents are the genera Elymus and Hordeum. Species are native to subarctic and temperate regions of the Northern Hemisphere, and are also found in northwestern Argentina. The genus was established by Rudolf Mansfeld in 1955.

== Species ==
As of November 2024, Plants of the World Online accepted the following species:

- × Elyhordeum arachleicum Peschkova
- × Elyhordeum arcuatum W.W.Mitch. & H.J.Hodgs.
- × Elyhordeum bowes-lyonii (Melderis) Melderis
- × Elyhordeum californicum (Bowden) Barkworth
- × Elyhordeum chatangense (Roshev.) Tzvelev
- × Elyhordeum dakotense (Bowden) Bowden
- × Elyhordeum detrinense Lysenko
- × Elyhordeum elymoides (Hack.) Hunz. & Xifreda
- × Elyhordeum iowense R.W.Pohl
- × Elyhordeum jordalii (Melderis) Tzvelev
- × Elyhordeum kirbyi M.P.Wilcox
- × Elyhordeum kolymense Prob.
- × Elyhordeum langei (K.Richt.) Melderis
- × Elyhordeum macounii (Vasey) Barkworth & D.R.Dewey
- × Elyhordeum montanense (Scribn.) Bowden
- × Elyhordeum pavlovii (Nevski) Tzvelev
- × Elyhordeum rouxii (Gren. & Duval-Jouve) Kerguélen
- × Elyhordeum schaackianum (Bowden) Bowden
- × Elyhordeum sinegoricum Lysenko
- × Elyhordeum stebbinsianum (Bowden) Bowden
