= Renvoizea =

Scientific classification
- Kingdom: Plantae
- Clade: Tracheophytes
- Clade: Angiosperms
- Clade: Monocots
- Clade: Commelinids
- Order: Poales
- Clade: Graminid clade
- Family: Poaceae
- Genus: Renvoizea; Zuloaga & Morrone

Genus of grasses

Renvoizea is a genus of plants in the grass family.

It is native range is north-eastern and south-eastern Brazil.

The genus name Renvoizea is in honour of Stephen Andrew Renvoize (b. 1944), an English botanist who worked at Kew Gardens and was a specialist in grasses. It was first described and published in Syst. Bot. Vol.33 on page 294 in 2008.

== Known species ==
According to Kew;

- Renvoizea acicularifolia (Renvoize & Zuloaga) Zuloaga & Morrone
- Renvoizea durifolia (Renvoize & Zuloaga) Zuloaga & Morrone
- Renvoizea glaziovii (Hack.) Zuloaga & Morrone
- Renvoizea lagostachya (Renvoize & Zuloaga) Zuloaga & Morrone
- Renvoizea marauensis (Renvoize & Zuloaga) Zuloaga & Morrone
- Renvoizea restingae (Renvoize & Zuloaga) Zuloaga & Morrone
- Renvoizea sacciolepoides (Renvoize & Zuloaga) Zuloaga & Morrone
- Renvoizea teretifolia (Hack.) Zuloaga & Morrone
- Renvoizea trinii (Kunth) Zuloaga & Morrone
- Renvoizea vaginiviscosa (Renvoize & Zuloaga) Zuloaga & Morrone
