= Schmidiella =

Scientific classification
- Kingdom: Plantae
- Clade: Tracheophytes
- Clade: Angiosperms
- Clade: Monocots
- Clade: Commelinids
- Order: Poales
- Family: Poaceae
- Clade: BOP clade
- Subfamily: Pooideae
- Genus: Schmidiella; Veldkamp
- Species: S. maxwellii

Binomial name
- Schmidiella maxwellii Veldkamp

Genus of grasses

Schmidiella is a genus of grasses. It includes a single species, Schmidiella maxwellii, an annual endemic to Laos.

The genus and species were described in 2018 by Jan Frederik Veldkamp, from a sample collected by James Franklin Maxwell, after whom the species is named.
