= × Aegilotriticum =

Scientific classification
- Kingdom: Plantae
- Clade: Tracheophytes
- Clade: Angiosperms
- Clade: Monocots
- Clade: Commelinids
- Order: Poales
- Family: Poaceae
- Subfamily: Pooideae
- Supertribe: Triticodae
- Tribe: Triticeae
- Genus: × Aegilotriticum; P.Fourn

Nothogenus of plants

× Aegilotriticum is a nothogenus of flowering plants in the family Poaceae. They are the result of crosses between species of two distinct grass genera, Aegilops (goatgrasses) and Triticum (wheat). This type of intergeneric hybridization is quite rare, and is indicated by a multiplication symbol before the name. The name Aegilotriticum is an example of a portmanteau word, a combination of the two parents' names. This genus has at least 7 species.

== Taxonomy ==
This genus was first described by Paul Victor Fournier and published in Les Quartre Flores de la France in 1935.

== Species ==
As of 2017, the Plants of the World Online recognised the following nothospecies in the genus:

1. × Aegilotriticum erebunii (Gandilyan) van Slageren
2. × Aegilotriticum grenieri (C.Richt.) P.Fourn
3. × Aegilotriticum langeanum (Amo) van Slageren
4. × Aegilotriticum rodetii (Trab.) van Slageren
5. × Aegilotriticum sancti-andreae (Degen) Soó
6. × Aegilotriticum speltiforme (Jord.) van Slageren
7. × Aegilotriticum triticoides (Req. ex Bertol.) van Slageren

== Distribution ==
The hybrid genus has been found in Algeria, Morocco, Tunisia, France, Spain, Italy, Hungary, Greece, Crimea, the Caucasus, Turkey, Iran, Uzbekistan, Turkmenistan, Syria and Palestine. It has also been introduced to Kansas, USA.
