= Sibirotrisetum =

Scientific classification
- Kingdom: Plantae
- Clade: Tracheophytes
- Clade: Angiosperms
- Clade: Monocots
- Clade: Commelinids
- Order: Poales
- Family: Poaceae
- Subfamily: Pooideae
- Genus: Sibirotrisetum; Barberá, Soreng, Romasch., Quintanar & P.M.Peterson

Genus of grasses

Sibirotrisetum is a genus of grasses. It includes seven species native to subarctic and temperate Eurasia, from Poland and Turkey to the Himalayas, Japan, and the Russian Far East, as well as New Guinea and western subarctic North America (Alaska and the Yukon).

== Species ==
Seven species are accepted.

- Sibirotrisetum aeneum (Hook.f.) Barberá
- Sibirotrisetum bifidum (Thunb.) Barberá
- Sibirotrisetum henryi (Rendle) Barberá
- Sibirotrisetum litorale (Roshev.) Chepinoga
- Sibirotrisetum scitulum (Bor ex Barberá) Barberá
- Sibirotrisetum sibiricum (Rupr.) Barberá
- Sibirotrisetum turcicum (Chrtek) Barberá
