= Tzveleviochloa =

Scientific classification
- Kingdom: Plantae
- Clade: Tracheophytes
- Clade: Angiosperms
- Clade: Monocots
- Clade: Commelinids
- Order: Poales
- Family: Poaceae
- Genus: Tzveleviochloa; Röser & A.Wölk

Genus of flowering plants

Tzveleviochloa is a genus of flowering plants belonging to the family Poaceae.

Its native range is the Himalayas, India and Myanmar to south central China.

The genus name of Tzveleviochloa is in honour of Nikolai Tzvelev (1925–2015), a Russian botanist and specialist in grasses and ferns.

It was first described and published by Martin Röser and Alexandra Wölkin in Taxon vol.66 on page 38 in 2017.

== Known species ==
According to Kew:

- Tzveleviochloa burmanica (Bor) Röser & A.Wölk
- Tzveleviochloa delavayi (Hack.) Barberá, Soreng & Quintanar
- Tzveleviochloa parviflora (Hook.f.) Röser & A.Wölk
- Tzveleviochloa potaninii (Tzvelev) Röser & A.Wölk
- Tzveleviochloa schmidii (Hook.f.) E.A.Kellogg
- Tzveleviochloa uniyalii (Kandwal & B.K.Gupta) D.Prasad & P.Agnihotri
- Tzveleviochloa yadavii D.Prasad & P.Agnihotri
