= Parianella =

Scientific classification
- Kingdom: Plantae
- Clade: Tracheophytes
- Clade: Angiosperms
- Clade: Monocots
- Clade: Commelinids
- Order: Poales
- Family: Poaceae
- Genus: Parianella; Hollowell, F.M.Ferreira & R.P.Oliveira

Genus of plants

Parianella is a genus of flowering plants belonging to the family Poaceae.

Its native range is Northeastern Brazil.

== Species ==
Species:

- Parianella carvalhoi (R.P.Oliveira & Longhi-Wagner) F.M.Ferreira & R.P.Oliveira
- Parianella lanceolata (Trin.) F.M.Ferreira & R.P.Oliveira
