= Hyalopodium =

Scientific classification
- Kingdom: Plantae
- Clade: Tracheophytes
- Clade: Angiosperms
- Clade: Monocots
- Clade: Commelinids
- Order: Poales
- Family: Poaceae
- Subfamily: Pooideae
- Genus: Hyalopodium; Röser & Tkach

Genus of grasses

Hyalopodium is a genus of grasses. It includes two species native to the Caucasus and eastern Turkey.

- Hyalopodium araraticum (Lipsky) Röser & Tkach
- Hyalopodium colchicum (Albov) L.J.Gillespie & Soreng
