= Pseudotrachys =

Scientific classification
- Kingdom: Plantae
- Clade: Tracheophytes
- Clade: Angiosperms
- Clade: Monocots
- Clade: Commelinids
- Order: Poales
- Family: Poaceae
- Subfamily: Panicoideae
- Supertribe: Panicodae
- Tribe: Paniceae
- Genus: Pseudotrachys; M.Anil Kumar & B.R.P.Rao

Genus of grasses

Pseudotrachys is a genus of grasses. It includes two species endemic to southern India.

- Pseudotrachys deccanensis (M.Anil Kumar & B.R.P.Rao) M.Anil Kumar & B.R.P.Rao
- Pseudotrachys narasimhanii (Ravich.) M.Anil Kumar & B.R.P.Rao
