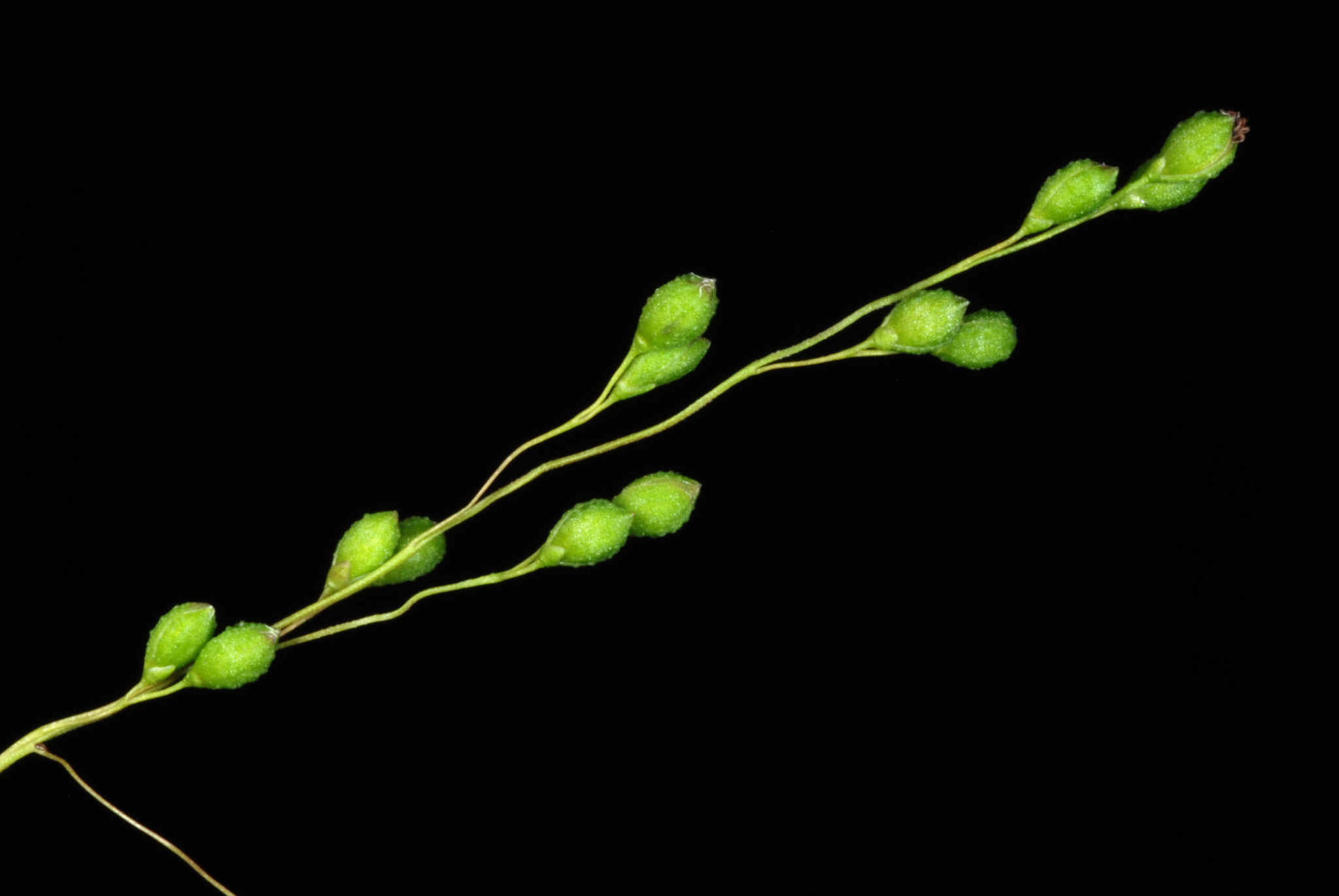
- Kellochloa verrucosa

Scientific classification
- Kingdom: Plantae
- Clade: Tracheophytes
- Clade: Angiosperms
- Clade: Monocots
- Clade: Commelinids
- Order: Poales
- Family: Poaceae
- Genus: Kellochloa; Lizarazu, Nicola & Scataglini

= Kellochloa =

Genus of plants

Kellochloa is a genus of flowering plants belonging to the family Poaceae.

Its native range is Central and Eastern USA.

The genus name of Kellochloa is in honour of Elizabeth Anne Kellog (b.1951) an American botanist.

The genus was published by Mabel A. Lizarazu, Marcela Viviana Nicola and M. Amalia Scataglini in Pl. Syst. Evol. vol.301 (issue 9) on page 2256. in 2015.

Known species:

- Kellochloa brachyantha (Steud.) Lizarazu, Nicola & Scataglini
- Kellochloa verrucosa (Muhl.) Lizarazu, Nicola & Scataglini
