= Baptorhachis =

Scientific classification
- Kingdom: Plantae
- Clade: Tracheophytes
- Clade: Angiosperms
- Clade: Monocots
- Clade: Commelinids
- Order: Poales
- Family: Poaceae
- Subfamily: Panicoideae
- Supertribe: Andropogonodae
- Tribe: Paspaleae
- Subtribe: Paspalinae
- Genus: Baptorhachis; Clayton & Renvoize
- Species: B. foliacea

Binomial name
- Baptorhachis foliacea (Clayton) Clayton

Synonyms
- Stereochlaena foliacea Clayton

Genus of grasses

Baptorhachis is a genus of Southwest African plants in the grass family. The only known species is Baptorhachis foliacea, found only in Mozambique.

== See also ==
- List of Poaceae genera
