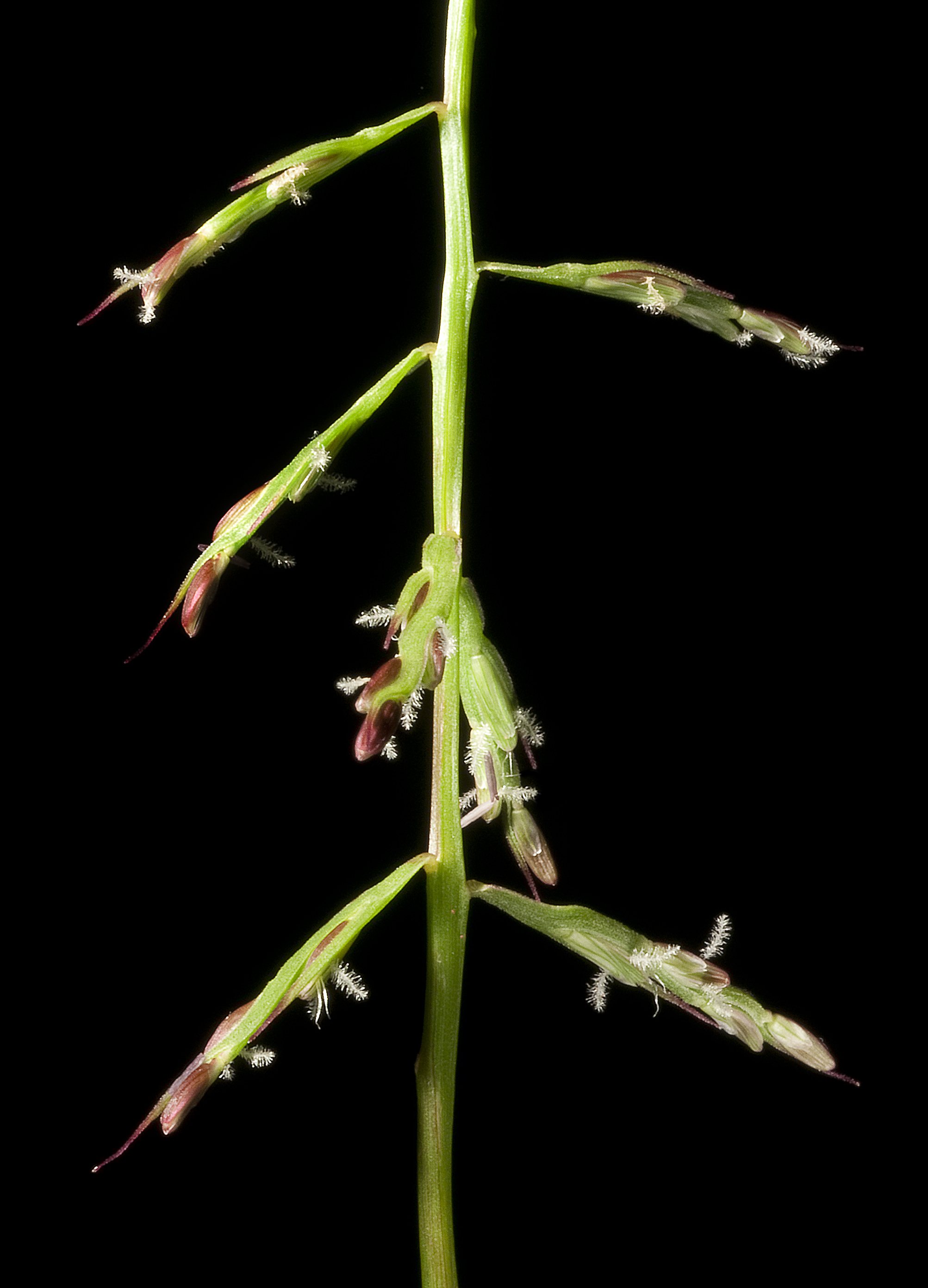
- Paractaenum novae-hollandiae

Scientific classification
- Kingdom: Plantae
- Clade: Tracheophytes
- Clade: Angiosperms
- Clade: Monocots
- Clade: Commelinids
- Order: Poales
- Family: Poaceae
- Subfamily: Panicoideae
- Supertribe: Panicodae
- Tribe: Paniceae
- Subtribe: Cenchrinae
- Genus: Paractaenum; P.Beauv.

Type species
- Paractaenum novae-hollandiae P.Beauv.

Synonyms
- Parectenium Stapf, alternate spelling

= Paractaenum =

Genus of grasses

Paractaenum is a genus of Australian plants in the grass family.

The genus name, Paractaenum, comes from the Greek, παραkτείνω, meaning "I extend".

Species

- Paractaenum novae-hollandiae P.Beauv. - Australia (Northern Territory, all states except Tasmania)
- Paractaenum refractum (F.Muell.) R.D.Webster - Australia (Northern Territory, all states except Tasmania + Victoria)
