= Podagrostis =

Scientific classification
- Kingdom: Plantae
- Clade: Tracheophytes
- Clade: Angiosperms
- Clade: Monocots
- Clade: Commelinids
- Order: Poales
- Family: Poaceae
- Subfamily: Pooideae
- Subtribe: Agrostidinae
- Genus: Podagrostis (Griseb.) Scribn. & Merr.

Genus of grasses

Podagrostis is a genus of grasses. It includes 12 species native to the Americas, ranging from Alaska through western North America, Mexico, Central America, and western South America to southern South America.

== Species ==
12 species are accepted.

- Podagrostis aequivalvis (Trin.) Scribn. & Merr.
- Podagrostis bacillata (Hack.) Sylvester & Soreng
- Podagrostis colombiana Sylvester & Soreng
- Podagrostis exserta (Swallen) Sylvester & Soreng
- Podagrostis humilis (Vasey) Björkman
- Podagrostis liebmannii (E.Fourn.) Sylvester & Soreng
- Podagrostis meridensis (Luces) A.M.Molina & Rúgolo
- Podagrostis novogaliciana (McVaugh) A.M.Molina & Rúgolo
- Podagrostis rosei (Scribn. & Merr.) Sylvester & Soreng
- Podagrostis sesquiflora (É.Desv.) Parodi ex Nicora
- Podagrostis thurberiana (Hitchc.) Hultén
- Podagrostis trichodes (Kunth) Sylvester & Soreng
