= Morronea =

Scientific classification
- Kingdom: Plantae
- Clade: Tracheophytes
- Clade: Angiosperms
- Clade: Monocots
- Clade: Commelinids
- Order: Poales
- Family: Poaceae
- Genus: Morronea; Zuloaga & Scataglini

Genus of plants

Morronea is a genus of flowering plants belonging to the family Poaceae.

Its native range is Mexico to Tropical America.

Species:

- Morronea arundinariae (Trin. ex E.Fourn.) Zuloaga & Scataglini
- Morronea cayoensis (Swallen) Zuloaga & Scataglini
- Morronea guatemalensis (Swallen) Zuloaga & Scataglini
- Morronea incumbens (Swallen) Zuloaga & Scataglini
- Morronea parviglumis (Hack.) Zuloaga & Scataglini
- Morronea trichidiachnis (Döll) Zuloaga & Scataglini
