= Littledalea =

Scientific classification
- Kingdom: Plantae
- Clade: Tracheophytes
- Clade: Angiosperms
- Clade: Monocots
- Clade: Commelinids
- Order: Poales
- Family: Poaceae
- Clade: BOP clade
- Subfamily: Pooideae
- Supertribe: Triticodae
- Tribe: Littledaleae; Soreng & J.I. Davis (2015)
- Genus: Littledalea; Hemsl.

Type species
- Littledalea tibetica Hemsl.

Genus of grasses

Littledalea racemosa

Littledalea is a genus of Asian plants in the grass family, native to mountains in China and neighboring countries. The genus is placed in its own tribe Littledaleae within subfamily Pooideae. The isolated tribe seems to be sister to the tribes Bromeae and Triticeae.

Genus was named for British game hunter Clement St. George Royds Littledale (1851–1931)

Species

- Littledalea alaica (Korsh.) Petrov ex Kom. - Qinghai, Tibet, Kazakhstan, Kyrgyzstan, Tajikistan
- Littledalea przevalskyi Tzvelev - Gansu, Qinghai, Tibet
- Littledalea racemosa Keng - Qinghai, Tibet, Sichuan, Yunnan
- Littledalea tibetica Hemsl. - Tibet, Nepal, Yunnan
