= Hypseochloa =

Scientific classification
- Kingdom: Plantae
- Clade: Tracheophytes
- Clade: Angiosperms
- Clade: Monocots
- Clade: Commelinids
- Order: Poales
- Family: Poaceae
- Subfamily: Pooideae
- Supertribe: Poodae
- Tribe: Poeae
- Subtribe: Agrostidinae
- Genus: Hypseochloa; C.E.Hubb.

Type species
- Hypseochloa cameroonensis C.E.Hubb.

Genus of grasses

Hypseochloa is a genus of African plants in the grass family.

Species

- Hypseochloa cameroonensis C.E. Hubb. – southern Nigeria, Cameroon, Tanzania
- Hypseochloa matengoensis C.E. Hubb. – Matengo Highlands in Songea District of western Tanzania
