= Patzkea =

Scientific classification
- Kingdom: Plantae
- Clade: Embryophytes
- Clade: Tracheophytes
- Clade: Spermatophytes
- Clade: Angiosperms
- Clade: Monocots
- Clade: Commelinids
- Order: Poales
- Clade: Graminid clade
- Family: Poaceae
- Genus: Patzkea; G.H.Loos

Genus of plants

Patzkea is a genus of plants in the grass family.

It is native to Europe and Africa. It is found in Europe within Albania, Austria, Bulgaria, France, Greece, Italy, Portugal, Romania, Sicily, Spain, Switzerland and Yugoslavia. In Africa it is found in Algeria, Morocco and Tunisia.

The genus name of Patzkea is in honour of Erwin Patzke (1929–2018), German botanist and professor, specialist in grasses. It was first described and published in Jahrb. Bochum. Bot. Vereins Vol.1 on page 126 in 2010.

== Known species ==
According to Kew;

- Patzkea coerulescens (Desf.) H.Scholz
- Patzkea durandoi (Clauson) G.H.Loos
- Patzkea paniculata (L.) G.H.Loos
- Patzkea patula (Desf.) H.Scholz
