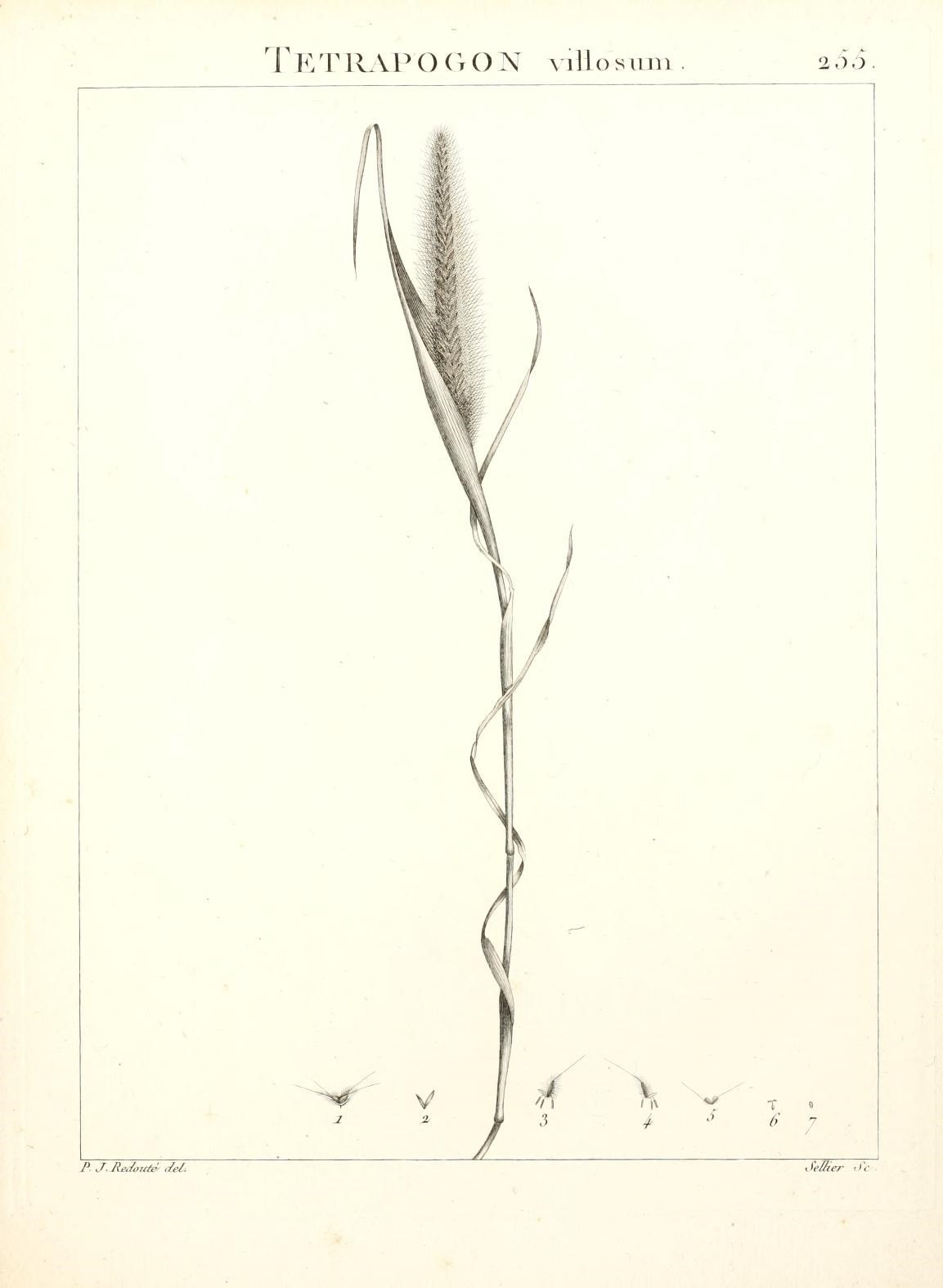
- Tetrapogon villosus

Scientific classification
- Kingdom: Plantae
- Clade: Tracheophytes
- Clade: Angiosperms
- Clade: Monocots
- Clade: Commelinids
- Order: Poales
- Family: Poaceae
- Subfamily: Chloridoideae
- Tribe: Cynodonteae
- Subtribe: Eleusininae
- Genus: Tetrapogon; Desf.

Type species
- Tetrapogon villosus Desf.

Synonyms
- Codonachne Steud.; Cryptochloris Benth.; Lepidopironia A. Rich.

= Tetrapogon =

Genus of grasses

Tetrapogon is a genus of grasses.

The name Tetrapogon derives from the Greek roots tetra- and pogon, meaning "four" and "beard", respectively, in reference to the tufts of hairs on the plant. The species in this genus are distributed across Africa and through the Middle East as far east as India.

Species

- Tetrapogon bidentatus Pilg. - Tanzania, Kenya
- Tetrapogon cenchriformis (A.Rich.) Pilg. - Africa + Arabia from Cape Verde to Saudi Arabia to Tanzania
- Tetrapogon ferrugineus (Renvoize) S.M.Phillips - Ethiopia, Kenya, Somalia
- Tetrapogon tenellus Chiov. - India
- Tetrapogon tetrastachys Hack. ex Hook.f. - Indian subcontinent; Arabian Peninsula; Africa from Djibouti to Mpumalanga
- Tetrapogon villosus Desf. - - Africa + southwest Asia from Canary Islands to Turkmenistan to Uganda

formerly included

see Chloris

- Tetrapogon flabellatus - Chloris flabellata
- Tetrapogon mossambicensis - Chloris mossambicensis
- Tetrapogon tetrastachys - Chloris montana
