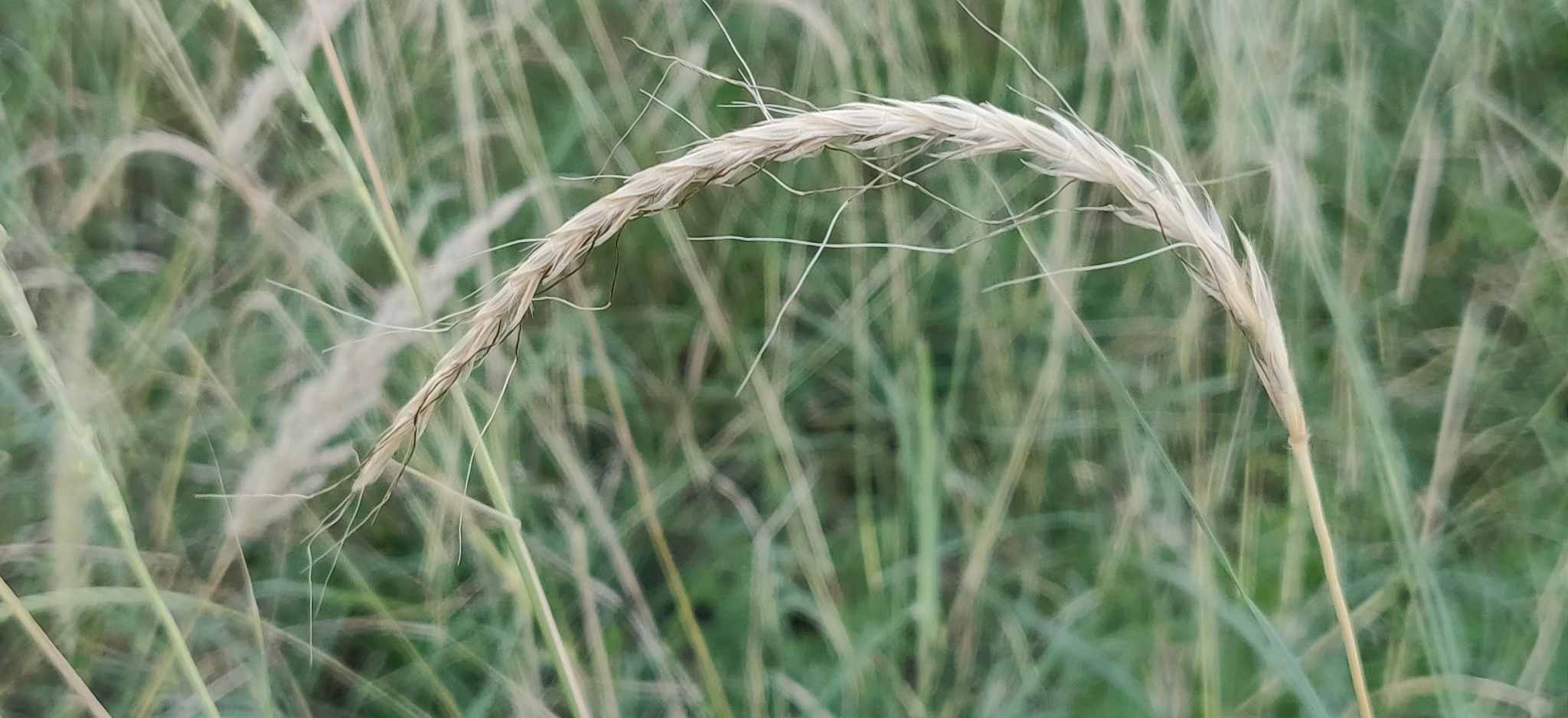
- Sehima nervosum

Scientific classification
- Kingdom: Plantae
- Clade: Tracheophytes
- Clade: Angiosperms
- Clade: Monocots
- Clade: Commelinids
- Order: Poales
- Family: Poaceae
- Subfamily: Panicoideae
- Supertribe: Andropogonodae
- Tribe: Andropogoneae
- Genus: Sehima; Forssk.

Type species
- Sehima ischaemoides Forssk.

Synonyms
- Hologamium Nees

= Sehima =

Genus of grasses

Sehima is a genus of mostly Asian and African plants in the grass family.

The generic name is derived from the Arabic سحيم sæḥīm ('black'), local name of the type species in its native Yemen.

Species

- Sehima galpinii Stent - Angola, Mozambique, KwaZulu-Natal, Eswatini, Mpumalanga, Limpopo
- Sehima ischaemoides Forssk. - drier parts of Asia and Africa from Cape Verde to Limpopo to India
- Sehima nervosum (Rottler) Stapf - eastern Africa from Eritrea to Mozambique; southern Asia from Yemen to southern China to Java; New Guinea to northern Australia
- Sehima notatum (Hack.) A.Camus - Uttar Pradesh
- Sehima sulcatum (Hack.) A.Camus - Myanmar, Tamil Nadu, Madhya Pradesh

formerly included

see Andropogon Andropterum Eremochloa Ischaemum Pogonachne Thelepogon Triplopogon

- Sehima beccarii - Ischaemum beccarii
- Sehima ciliare - Eremochloa ciliaris
- Sehima elegans - Thelepogon elegans
- Sehima racemosum - Pogonachne racemosa
- Sehima ramosissimum - Triplopogon ramosissimus
- Sehima spathiflorum - Triplopogon ramosissimus
- Sehima textilis - Andropogon textilis
- Sehima variegatum - Andropterum stolzii
