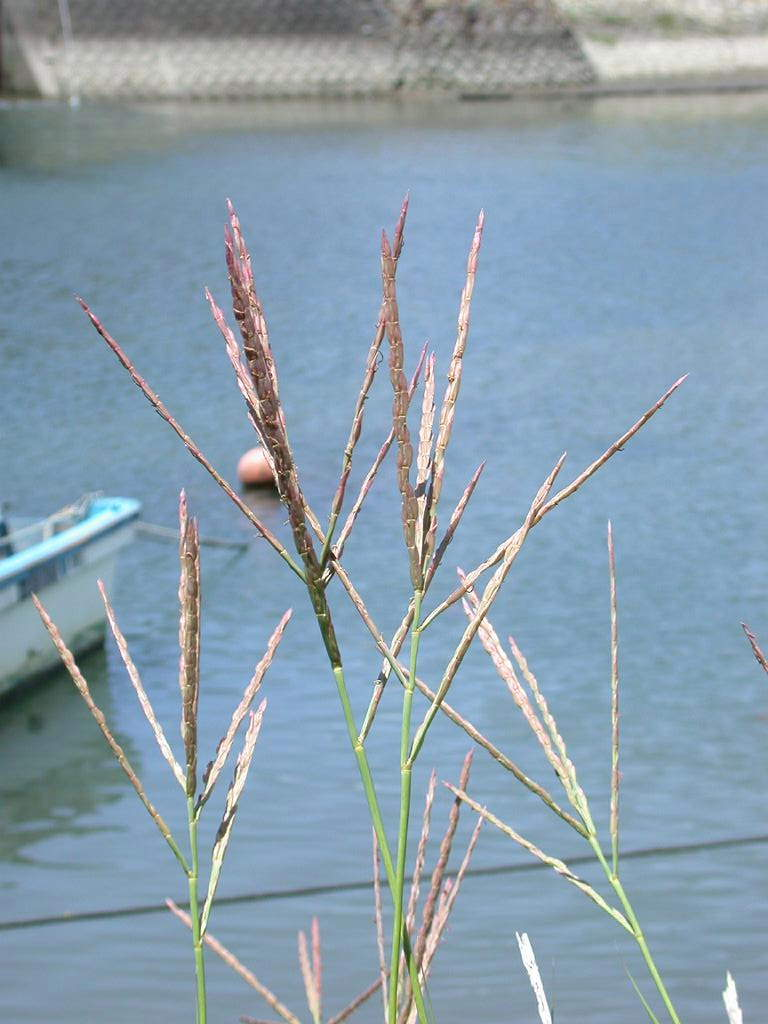
- Phacelurus latifolius

Scientific classification
- Kingdom: Plantae
- Clade: Tracheophytes
- Clade: Angiosperms
- Clade: Monocots
- Clade: Commelinids
- Order: Poales
- Family: Poaceae
- Subfamily: Panicoideae
- Supertribe: Andropogonodae
- Tribe: Andropogoneae
- Subtribe: Rottboelliinae
- Genus: Phacelurus; Griseb.

Type species
- Phacelurus digitatus (Sibth. & Sm.) Griseb.

Synonyms
- Rottboellia subg. Phacelurus (Griseb.) Hack.; Jardinea Steud.; Pseudophacelurus A.Camus; Pseudovossia A.Camus

= Phacelurus =

Genus of grasses

Phacelurus is a genus of African and Eurasian plants in the grass family.

Species

- Phacelurus cambogiensis (Balansa) Clayton - Laos, Cambodia
- Phacelurus digitatus (Sm.) Griseb. - Albania, Bulgaria, Greece, Turkey, Lebanon, Syria
- Phacelurus franksae (J.M.Wood) Clayton - Zambia, Zimbabwe, KwaZulu-Natal
- Phacelurus gabonensis (Steud.) Clayton - tropical Africa
- Phacelurus latifolius (Steud.) Ohwi -- China, Korea, Japan
- Phacelurus speciosus (Steud.) C.E.Hubb. - Afghanistan, Pakistan, Jammu-Kashmir
- Phacelurus trichophyllus S.L.Zhong - Sichuan, Yunnan

formerly included

see Loxodera and Thyrsia

- Phacelurus caespitosus - Loxodera caespitosa
- Phacelurus huillensis (Rendle) Clayton - Thyrsia huillensis (Rendle) Stapf
- Phacelurus schliebenii (Pilg.) Clayton - Thyrsia schliebenii Pilg.
- Phacelurus zea (C.B.Clarke) Clayton – Thyrsia zea (C.B.Clarke) Stapf
