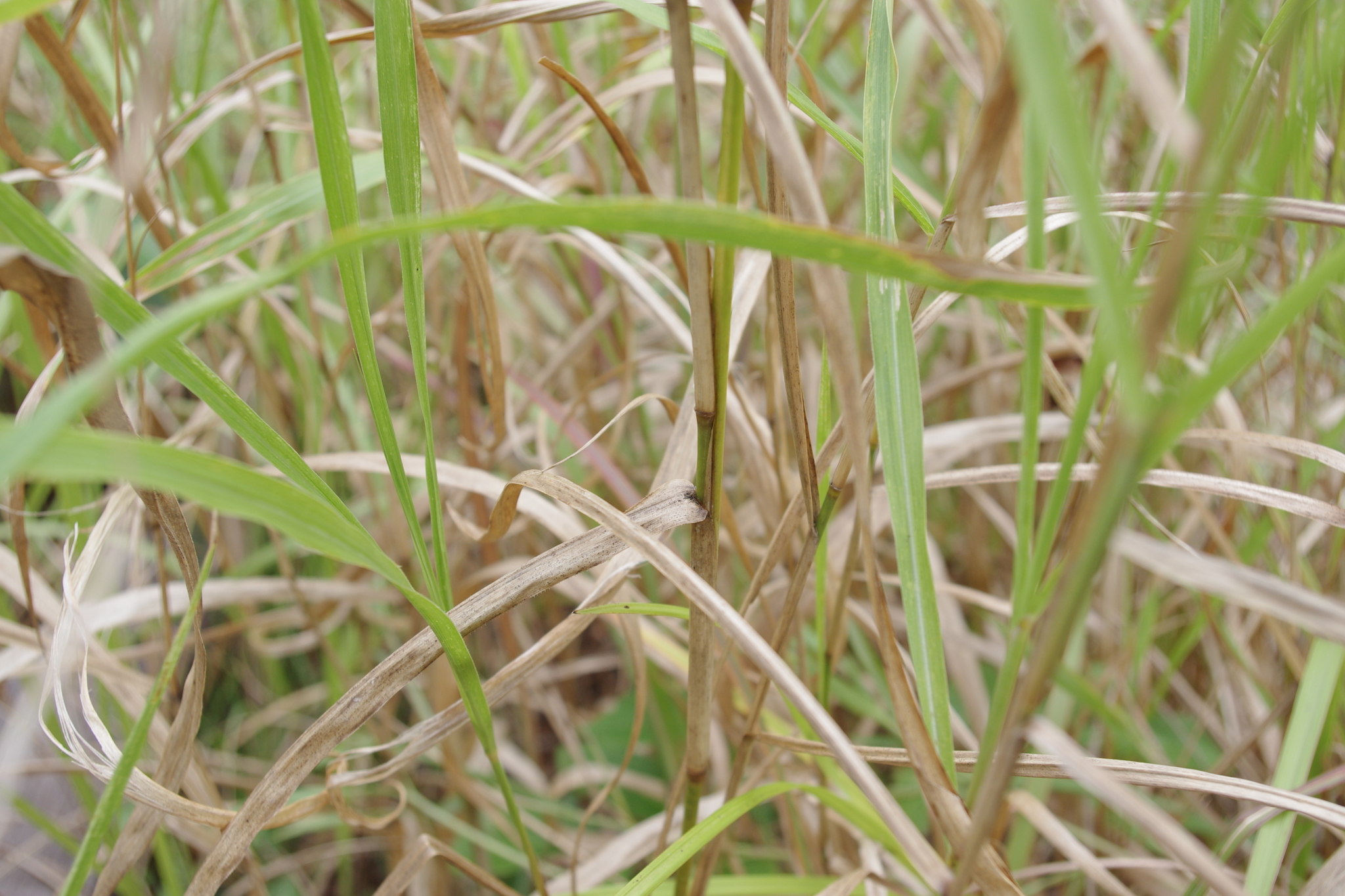
- Polytoca cyathopoda

Scientific classification
- Kingdom: Plantae
- Clade: Tracheophytes
- Clade: Angiosperms
- Clade: Monocots
- Clade: Commelinids
- Order: Poales
- Family: Poaceae
- Subfamily: Panicoideae
- Supertribe: Andropogonodae
- Tribe: Andropogoneae
- Subtribe: Chionachninae
- Genus: Polytoca; R.Br.

Synonyms
- Chionachne R.Br.; Cyathorhachis Nees ex Steud.; Sclerachne R.Br.

= Polytoca =

Genus of grasses

Polytoca is a genus of Indomalayan and Australasian plants in the grass family.

== Species ==
11 species are accepted.

- Polytoca biaurita (Hack.) Mabb. – Philippines (Luzon)
- Polytoca cyathopoda (F.Muell.) F.M.Bailey – New Guinea and northern Australia
- Polytoca digitata (L.f.) Druce – southern China, eastern Himalayas, Andaman Islands, Indochina, Philippines, Java, and New Guinea
- Polytoca gigantea (J.Koenig) Mabb. – Indian subcontinent, Sri Lanka, Indochina, Peninsular Malaysia, and Java
- Polytoca hubbardiana (Henrard) Mabb. – eastern Java, Lesser Sunda Islands, and northern Australia
- Polytoca javanica Henrard – eastern Java and the Lesser Sunda Islands
- Polytoca macrophylla Benth. – Maluku and Papuasia
- Polytoca massiei (Balansa) Schenck ex Henrard – Indochina and Hainan
- Polytoca punctata (R.Br.) Hook.f. – Indochina, Philippines, Java, and the Lesser Sunda Islands
- Polytoca semiteres Benth. ex Hook.f. – western and southern India and Myanmar
- Polytoca wallichiana (Nees ex Steud.) Benth. – eastern Himalayas, Andaman & Nicobar Islands, Thailand, Myanmar, and Vietnam

=== Formerly included ===
See Cleistochloa and Trilobachne

- Cleistochloa sclerachne (F.M.Bailey) C.E.Hubb. (as Polytoca sclerachne (F.M.Bailey) F.M.Bailey)
- Trilobachne cookei (Stapf) Schenck ex Henrard (as Polytoca cookei Stapf)
