= Monium =

Monium may refer to:

- Anadelphia, a genus of African plants in the grass family
- Monium (element), a mixture of the elements gadolinium and terbium that was originally thought be an element itself
- Monium (album), a 1974 album by flautist Jeremy Steig
