= Euclasta =

Euclasta is the scientific name of two genera of organisms and may refer to:

- Euclasta (moth), a genus of moths in the family Crambidae
- Euclasta (plant), a genus of plants in the family Poaceae
