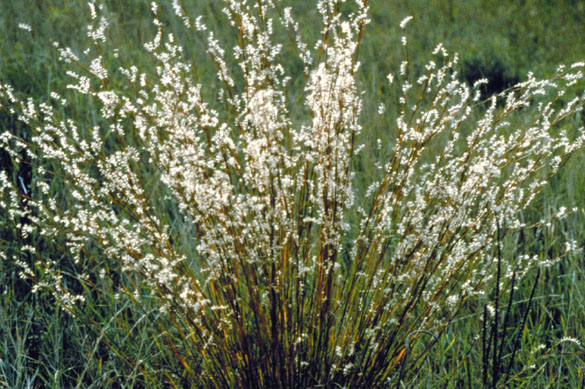
- Schizachyrium scoparium

Scientific classification
- Kingdom: Plantae
- Clade: Tracheophytes
- Clade: Angiosperms
- Clade: Monocots
- Clade: Commelinids
- Order: Poales
- Family: Poaceae
- Clade: PACMAD clade
- Subfamily: Panicoideae
- Supertribe: Andropogonodae
- Tribe: Andropogoneae; Dumort. (1824)

Subtribes
- See text.

Synonyms
- Sacchareae Dumort. (1824); Coiceae Nakai (1943); Euchlaeneae Nakai (1943); Imperateae Godr. & Gren. (1855); Maydeae Dumort. (1824, nom. illeg.); Ophiureae Dumort. (1824); Rottboellieae Kunth (1829); Sacchareae Rchb. ex Horan. (1847, as Saccharinae); Tripsaceae C.E. Hubb. ex Nakai (1943); Zeeae Rchb. (1828, unranked); Zeeae Nakai (1943)

= Andropogoneae =

Tribe of grasses

The Andropogoneae, sometimes called the sorghum tribe, are a large tribe of grasses (family Poaceae) with roughly 1,200 species in 90 genera, mainly distributed in tropical and subtropical areas. They include such important crops as maize (corn), sugarcane, and sorghum. All species in this tribe use C_{4} carbon fixation, which makes them competitive under warm, high-light conditions.

Andropogoneae is classified in supertribe Andropogonodae, together with its sister group Arundinelleae. Subdivisions include 12 subtribes, but the position of several genera within them is still unresolved (incertae sedis). Hybridisation was probably important in the evolution of the Andropogoneae, and the tribe's systematics are still not completely resolved. From the morphological point of view, the merging of the former subtribe 'Dimeriinae' (having solitary spikelets borne in 'robust' raceme rachis) into the subtribe Ischaeminae (having paired spikelets borne in 'fragile' raceme rachis) is doubtful. Affinities within the tribe are complex and still under investigation. Shahid Nawaz, a grass specialist at the Blatter Herbarium, is working on the phylogenomics of the tribe from India.

According to preliminary phytogeographic research on the tribe by M.S. Kiran Raj, Peninsular India, home to 54 genera (including nine endemic genera, viz., Bhidea, Lophopogon, Glyphochloa, Pogonachne, Trilobachne, Pseudodichanthium, Triplopogon, Nanooravia, and Manisuris) and roughly 500 species, is thought to be the primary or secondary centre of diversity for Andropogonoid grasses. About 40% of the representative taxa are exclusively endemic to peninsular India, with the highest species diversity and endemicity found in genera like Arthraxon, Chrysopogon, Cymbopogon, Dichanthium, Dimeria, Heteropogon, Ischaemum, Ophiorus, Sehima, and Themeda.

== Description ==
Spikelets within the inflorescence (flower cluster) are generally arranged on spicate racemes in pairs. A fertile, unstalked spikelet is subtended by a sterile, stalked spikelet. In species where awns are present they are found on the fertile, unstalked spikelet as an extension of the lemma.

== Subtribes and genera ==
=== 2017 classification ===
Classification following Soreng et al. (2017):

incertae sedis

- Apluda
- Chrysopogon (syn. Vetiveria)
- Eulaliopsis
- Microstegium (syn. Ischnochloa)
- Sehima
- Thelepogon

Arthraxoninae

- Arthraxon

Tripsacinae

- Elionurus
- Oxyrhachis
- Rhytachne
- Tripsacum
- Urelytrum
- Vossia
- Zea (syn. Euchlaena)

Chionachninae

- Chionachne
- Cyathorhachis
- Polytoca
- Sclerachne
- Trilobachne

Coicinae

- Coix

Rottboelliinae

- Chasmopodium
- Coelorachis
- Eremochloa
- Glyphochloa
- Hackelochloa
- Hemarthria
- Heteropholis
- Jardinea
- Lasiurus
- Loxodera
- Manisuris
- Mnesithea
- Ophiuros
- Phacelurus
- Ratzeburgia
- Rottboellia
- Thaumastochloa
- Thyrsia

Ischaeminae

- Andropterum
- Dimeria
- Ischaemum
- Kerriochloa
- Nanooravia
- Pogonachne
- Triplopogon

Germainiinae

- Apocopis
- Germainia
- Lophopogon
- Pogonatherum

Saccharinae

- Agenium
- Asthenochloa
- Cleistachne
- Erianthus
- Eriochrysis (syn. Leptosaccharum)
- Euclasta (syn. Indochloa)
- Eulalia
- Hemisorghum (syn. of Sorghum?)
- Homozeugos
- Imperata
- Lasiorhachis
- Leptatherum (syn. Polliniopsis)
- Miscanthidium
- Miscanthus (syn. Diadranthus, Rubomons, Triarrhena, Tenacistachya)
- Narenga
- Polytrias
- Pseudodichanthium
- Pseudopogonatherum
- Pseudosorghum (syn. of Eulalia?)
- Saccharum
- Sarga
- Sclerostachya
- Sorghastrum
- Sorghum (syn. Vacoparis)
- Trachypogon
- Tripidium
- Veldkampia

Andropogoninae

- Anadelphia
- Andropogon (syn. Hypogynium)
- Bhidea
- Bothriochloa
- Capillipedium
- Clausospicula
- Cymbopogon
- Dichanthium
- Diectomis
- Diheteropogon
- Elymandra
- Eremopogon
- Exotheca
- Heteropogon
- Hyparrhenia
- Hyperthelia
- Iseilema
- Lakshimia
- Monocymbium
- Parahyparrhenia
- Pseudanthistiria
- Schizachyrium
- Spathia
- Spodiopogon (syn. Eccoilopus)
- Themeda

=== 2020 classification ===
Classification following Welker et al. (2020) (one asterisk * marks genera not sampled in their analyses that were tentatively placed based on previously published phylogenetic analyses; two asterisks ** marks genera placed solely on morphology):

Tribe Andropogoneae Dumort. – 14 subtribes, 92 genera, and about 1224 species

- Subtribe Arthraxoninae Benth. – 1 genus and about 27 species
  - Arthraxon P.Beauv. – 27 species
- Subtribe Tripsacinae Dumort. – 2 genera and about 23 species
  - Tripsacum L. – 16 species
  - Zea L. – 7 species
- Subtribe Chionachninae Clayton – 3 genera and about 12 species
  - Chionachne R.Br. – 9 species
  - Polytoca R.Br. – 2 species
  - Trilobachne M.Schenck ex Henrard – 1 species **
- Subtribe Rhytachninae Welker & E.A.Kellogg – 5 genera and about 26 species
  - Loxodera Launert – 5 species
  - Oxyrhachis Pilg. – 1 species
  - Rhytachne Desv. ex Ham. – 12 species
  - Urelytrum Hack. – 7 species
  - Vossia Wall. & Griff. – 1 species
- Subtribe Chrysopogoninae Welker & E.A.Kellogg – 1 genus and about 49 species
  - Chrysopogon Trin. – 49 species
- Subtribe Rottboelliinae J.Presl = Coicinae Rchb. ex Clayton & Renvoize – 3 genera and about 13 species
  - Chasmopodium Stapf – 3 species *
  - Coix L. – 4 species
  - Rottboellia Naezén – 6 species
- Subtribe Ratzeburgiinae Hook.f. – 11 genera and about 87 species
  - Eremochloa Buse – 12 species
  - Glyphochloa Clayton – 9 species
  - Hackelochloa Kuntze – 2 species
  - Hemarthria R.Br. – 14 species
  - Heteropholis C.E.Hubb. – 6 species *
  - Manisuris L. – 1 species *
  - Mnesithea Kunth – 26 species
  - Ophiuros C.F.Gaertn. – 4 species *
  - Ratzeburgia Kunth – 1 species **
  - Thaumastochloa C.E.Hubb. – 8 species *
  - Thyrsia Stapf – 4 species
- Subtribe Ischaeminae J.Presl = Dimeriinae Hack. ex C.E.Hubb. – 4 genera and about 152 species
  - Andropterum Stapf – 1 species
  - Dimeria R.Br. – 61 species
  - Eulaliopsis Honda – 2 species
  - Ischaemum L. – 88 species
- Subtribe Germainiinae Clayton – 5 genera and about 44 species
  - Apocopis Nees – 16 species *
  - Germainia Balansa & Poitr. – 10 species
  - Imperata Cirillo – 13 species
  - Lophopogon Hack. – 2 species **
  - Pogonatherum P.Beauv. – 3 species
- Subtribe Sorghinae Bluff, Nees & Schauer ex Clayton & Renvoize – 4 genera and about 37 species
  - Cleistachne Benth. – 1 species
  - Lasiorhachis (Hack.) Stapf – 3 species
  - Sarga Ewart – 9 species
  - Sorghum Moench – 24 species
- Subtribe Saccharinae Griseb. – 3 genera and about 64 species
  - Miscanthus Andersson – 30 species
  - Pseudosorghum A.Camus – 2 species
  - Saccharum L. – 32 species
- Subtribe Apludinae Hook.f. – 7 genera and about 68 species
  - Apluda L. – 1 species
  - Asthenochloa Buse – 1 species **
  - Eulalia Kunth – 34 species
  - Homozeugos Stapf – 6 species
  - Polytrias Hack. – 1 species
  - Sorghastrum Nash – 21 species
  - Trachypogon Nees – 4 species
- Subtribe Anthistiriinae J.Presl – 9 genera and about 204 species
  - Bothriochloa Kuntze – 37 species
  - Capillipedium Stapf – 18 species
  - Cymbopogon Spreng. – 59 species
  - Dichanthium Willemet – 22 species
  - Eremopogon Stapf – 4 species *
  - Euclasta Franch. – 2 species
  - Heteropogon Pers. – 6 species
  - Iseilema Andersson – 24 species
  - Themeda Forrsk. – 32 species
- Subtribe Andropogoninae J.Presl – 11 genera and about 292 species
  - Anadelphia Hack. – 14 species
  - Andropogon L. – 125 species
  - Bhidea Stapf ex Bor – 3 species **
  - Diectomis Kunth – 1 species
  - Diheteropogon (Hack.) Stapf – 4 species
  - Elymandra Stapf – 6 species
  - Exotheca Andersson – 1 species
  - Hyparrhenia Andersson ex E.Fourn. – 58 species
  - Hyperthelia Clayton – 7 species
  - Monocymbium Stapf – 3 species
  - Schizachyrium Nees – 70 species
- Incertae sedis – 23 genera and about 126 species
  - Agenium Nees – 4 species *
  - Elionurus Humb. & Bonpl. ex Willd. – 17 species
  - Eriochrysis P.Beauv. – 11 species
  - Jardinea Steud. – 3 species
  - Kerriochloa C.E.Hubb. – 1 species
  - Lasiurus Boiss. – 1 species
  - Leptatherum Nees – 3 species *
  - Microstegium Nees – 27 species
  - Parahyparrhenia A.Camus – 6 species
  - Phacelurus Griseb. – 6 species *
  - Pseudopogonatherum A.Camus – 5 species *
  - Sehima Forssk. – 5 species
  - Spodiopogon Trin. – 18 species *
  - Thelepogon Roth – 2 species
  - Tripidium H.Scholz – 6 species
  - Clausospicula Lazarides – 1 species **
  - Lakshmia Veldkamp – 1 species **
  - Pogonachne Bor – 1 species **
  - Pseudanthistiria (Hack.) Hook.f. – 4 species **
  - Pseudodichanthium Bor – 1 species **
  - Spathia Ewart – 1 species **
  - Triplopogon Bor – 1 species **
  - Veldkampia Y. Ibaragi & Shiro Kobay. – 1 species **
