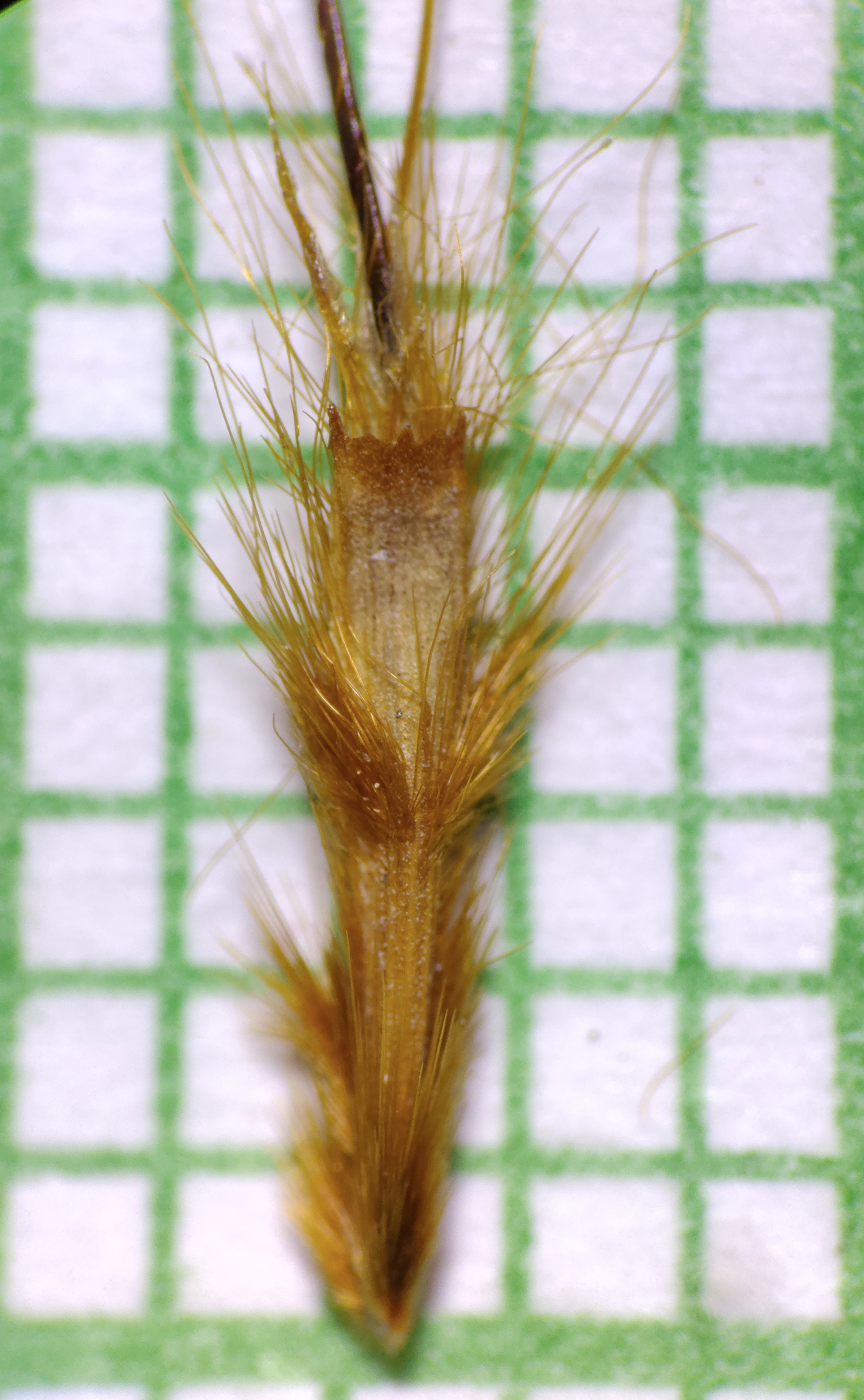

Scientific classification
- Kingdom: Plantae
- Clade: Tracheophytes
- Clade: Angiosperms
- Clade: Monocots
- Clade: Commelinids
- Order: Poales
- Family: Poaceae
- Subfamily: Panicoideae
- Supertribe: Andropogonodae
- Tribe: Andropogoneae
- Subtribe: Germainiinae
- Genus: Lophopogon; Hack.

Type species
- Lophopogon tridentatus (Roxb.) Hack.

= Lophopogon =

Genus of grasses

Lophopogon is a ditypic genus endemic to India, consisting of two well-known species Lophopogon tridentatus (Roxb.) Hackel and Lophopogon kingii Hook f. belonging to the tribe Andropogoneae in the grass family. Shahid Nawaz, an Indian agrostologist at Blatter Herbarium (BLAT), recently revised this genus from India.

Lophopogon prasannae, a species described from the state of Andhra Pradesh is allied to L. kingii and was thus synonymised as a new heterotypic synonym of the latter. L. tridentatus is a widely distributed species in India whereas L. kingii is a rare grass occurring in Bihar, Odisha, Andhra Pradesh and Karnataka in India.

Species

- Lophopogon kingii Hook.f. - Bihar, Odisha, Andhra Pradesh and Karnataka states in India.
- Lophopogon tridentatus (Roxb.) Hack. - Andhra pradesh, Madhya Pradesh, Maharashtra, Tamil Nadu

Formerly included

see Apocopis Germainia

- Lophopogon intermedius - Apocopis intermedia
- Lophopogon tenax - Germainia tenax
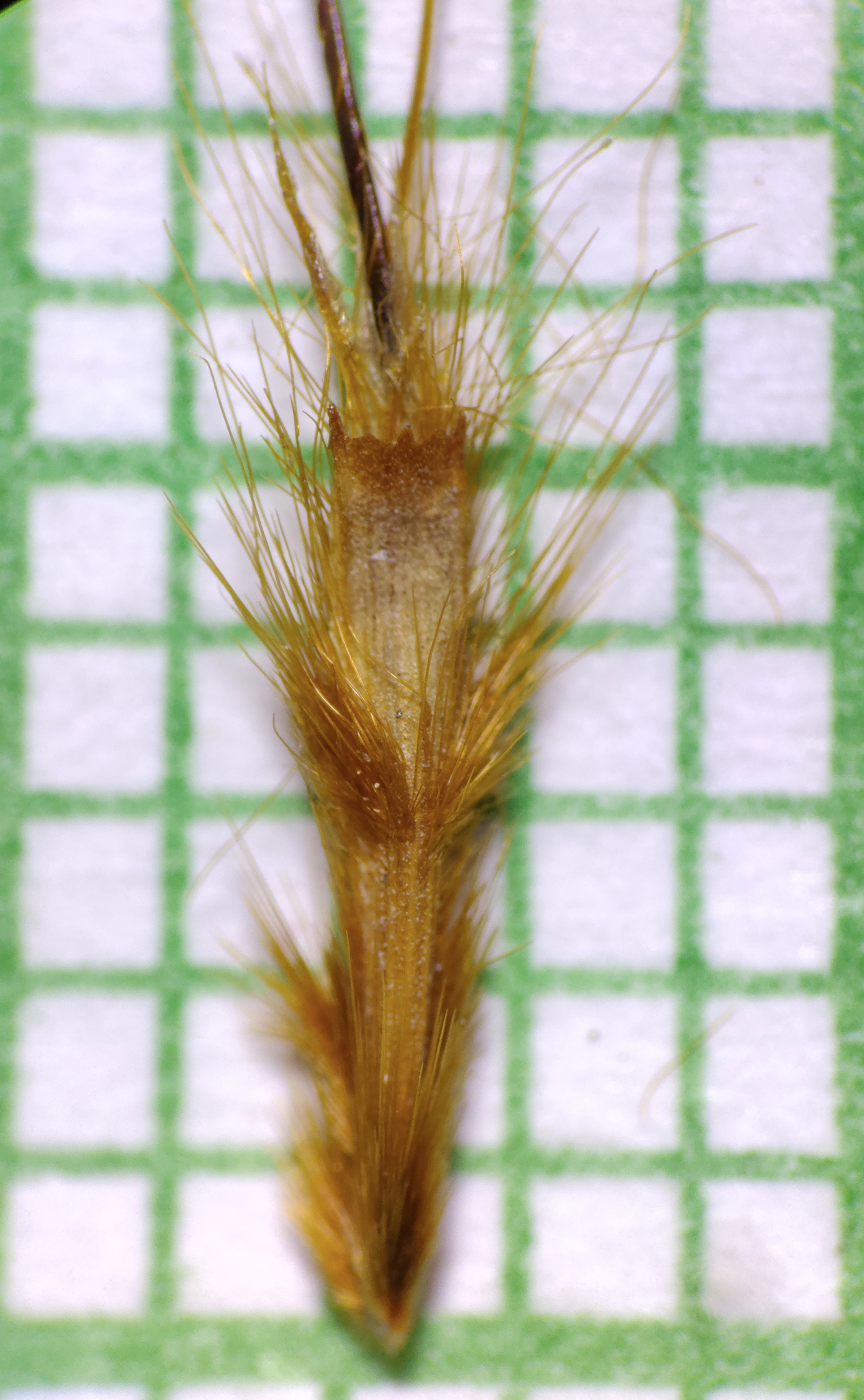
- Sessile spikelet of Lophopogon kingii.
  Lophopogon truncatiglumis - Germainia truncatiglumis
