= Monocymbium =

Scientific classification
- Kingdom: Plantae
- Clade: Tracheophytes
- Clade: Angiosperms
- Clade: Monocots
- Clade: Commelinids
- Order: Poales
- Family: Poaceae
- Subfamily: Panicoideae
- Supertribe: Andropogonodae
- Tribe: Andropogoneae
- Subtribe: Andropogoninae
- Genus: Monocymbium; Stapf

Type species
- Monocymbium ceresiiforme (Nees) Stapf

Genus of grasses

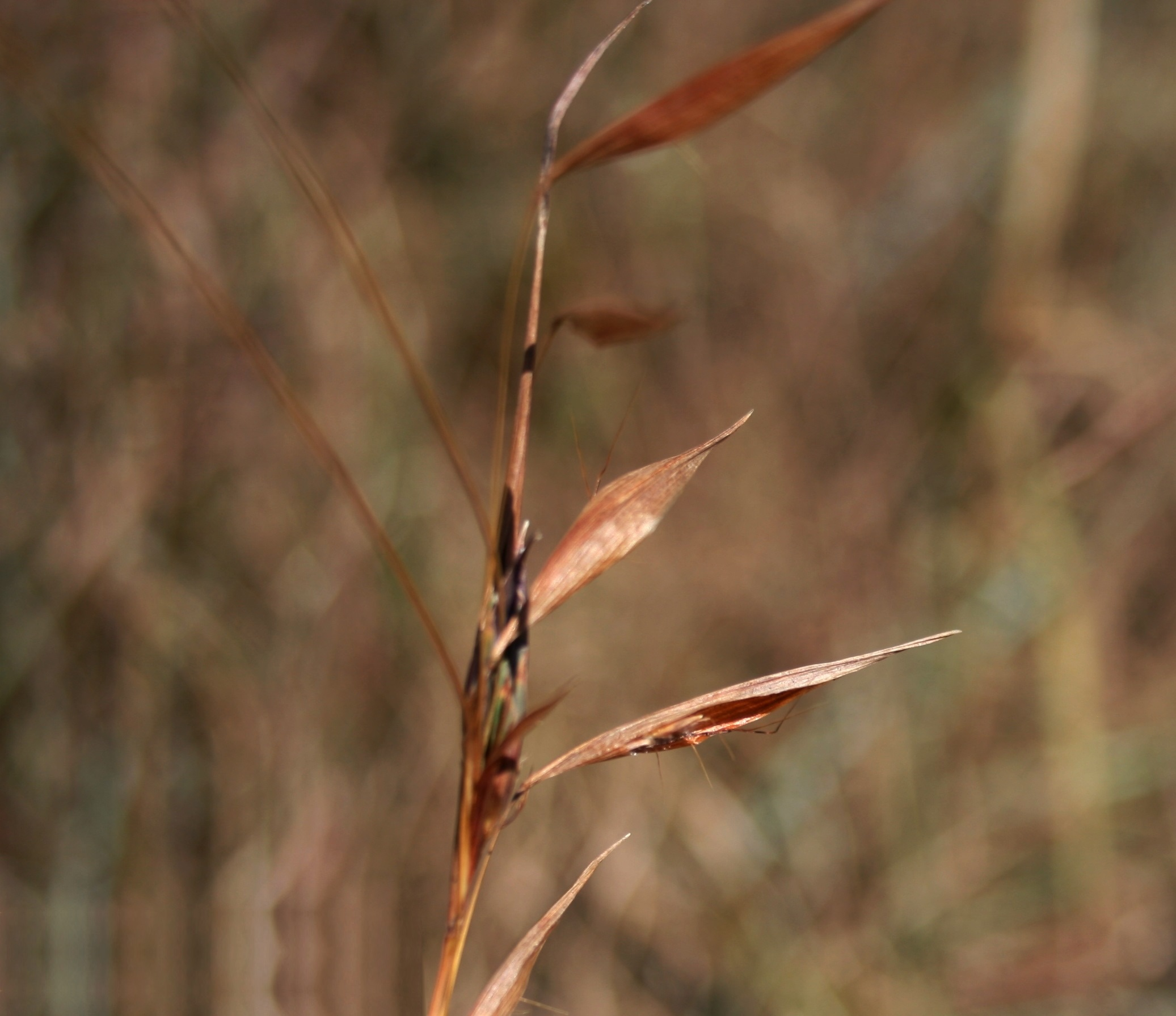
Monocymbium ceresiiforme

Monocymbium is a genus of African plants in the grass family.

Species

- Monocymbium ceresiiforme (Nees) Stapf - widespread in sub-Saharan Africa from Liberia to Ethiopia to Cape Province
- Monocymbium deightonii C.E.Hubb. - Guinea, Sierra Leone, Ivory Coast, Liberia
- Monocymbium lanceolatum C.E.Hubb. - Guinea, Sierra Leone
