= Thaumastochloa =

Scientific classification
- Kingdom: Plantae
- Clade: Tracheophytes
- Clade: Angiosperms
- Clade: Monocots
- Clade: Commelinids
- Order: Poales
- Family: Poaceae
- Subfamily: Panicoideae
- Supertribe: Andropogonodae
- Tribe: Andropogoneae
- Subtribe: Rottboelliinae
- Genus: Thaumastochloa; C.E.Hubb.

Type species
- Thaumastochloa pubescens C.E.Hubb.

Genus of grasses

Thaumastochloa is a genus of Australian, Papuasian, and Indonesian plants in the grass family.

Species

- Thaumastochloa brassii C.E.Hubb.
- Thaumastochloa heteromorpha B.K.Simon
- Thaumastochloa major S.T.Blake
- Thaumastochloa monilifera Sosef & de Koning
- Thaumastochloa pubescens (Benth.) C.E.Hubb.
- Thaumastochloa rariflora (F.M.Bailey) C.E.Hubb.
- Thaumastochloa robusta Sosef & de Koning
- Thaumastochloa rubra Sosef & de Koning
- Thaumastochloa striata Sosef & de Koning

formerly included

see Mnesithea

- Thaumastochloa chenii - Mnesithea laevis var. chenii
- Thaumastochloa cochinchinensis - Mnesithea laevis var. cochinchinensis
- Thaumastochloa cochinchinensis f. shimadana - Mnesithea laevis var. chenii
- Thaumastochloa shimadana - Mnesithea laevis var. chenii
