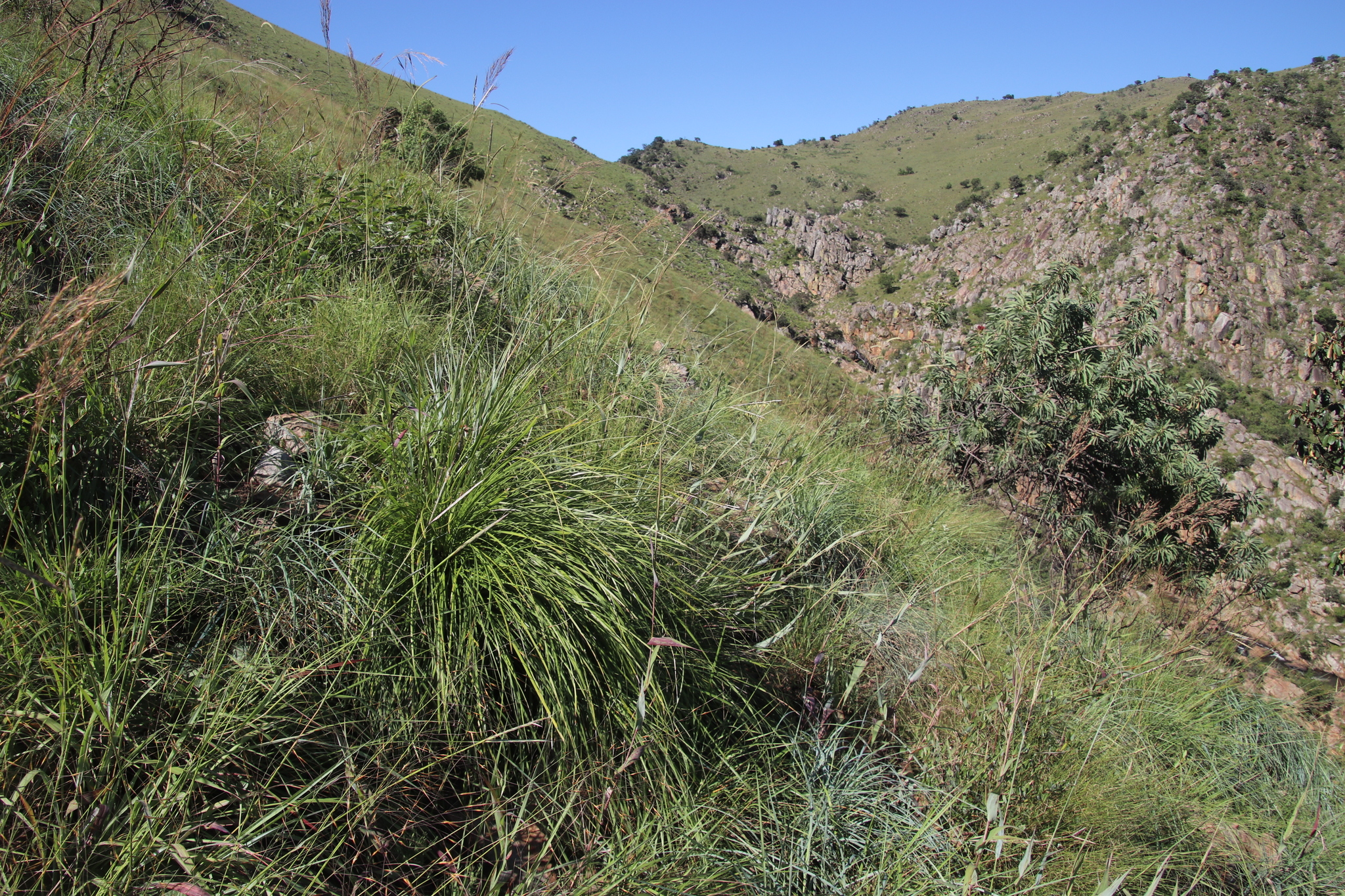
- Diheteropogon amplectens

Scientific classification
- Kingdom: Plantae
- Clade: Tracheophytes
- Clade: Angiosperms
- Clade: Monocots
- Clade: Commelinids
- Order: Poales
- Family: Poaceae
- Subfamily: Panicoideae
- Supertribe: Andropogonodae
- Tribe: Andropogoneae
- Subtribe: Andropogoninae
- Genus: Diheteropogon (Hack.) Stapf

Type species
- Andropogon grandiflorus (syn of D. filifolius) Hack.

Synonyms
- Andropogon sect. Diheteropogon Hack.

= Diheteropogon =

Genus of grasses

Diheteropogon is a genus of African plants in the grass family.

Species

- Diheteropogon amplectens (Nees) Clayton - from Mauritania to Tanzania + KwaZulu-Natal; also Madagascar
- Diheteropogon filifolius (Nees) Clayton - from Nigeria to Tanzania + KwaZulu-Natal
- Diheteropogon hagerupii Hitchc. - from Mauritania to Chad + Cameroon
- Diheteropogon microterus Clayton - Zambia
