= Miscanthidium =

Scientific classification
- Kingdom: Plantae
- Clade: Tracheophytes
- Clade: Angiosperms
- Clade: Monocots
- Clade: Commelinids
- Order: Poales
- Family: Poaceae
- Subfamily: Panicoideae
- Supertribe: Andropogonodae
- Tribe: Andropogoneae
- Subtribe: Andropogoninae
- Genus: Miscanthidium; Stapf (1917)

Species
- Miscanthidium junceum (Stapf) Stapf; Miscanthidium violaceum (K.Schum.) Robyns

Genus of flowering plants

Miscanthidium is a genus of flowering plants in the grass family, Poaceae. It includes two species native to eastern and southern Africa.

- Miscanthidium junceum (Stapf) Stapf – southern Democratic Republic of the Congo to Angola, Botswana, Namibia, Zambia, Zimbabwe, and South Africa
- Miscanthidium violaceum (K.Schum.) Robyns – Uganda and Kenya to Democratic Republic of the Congo, Tanzania, and Zambia
