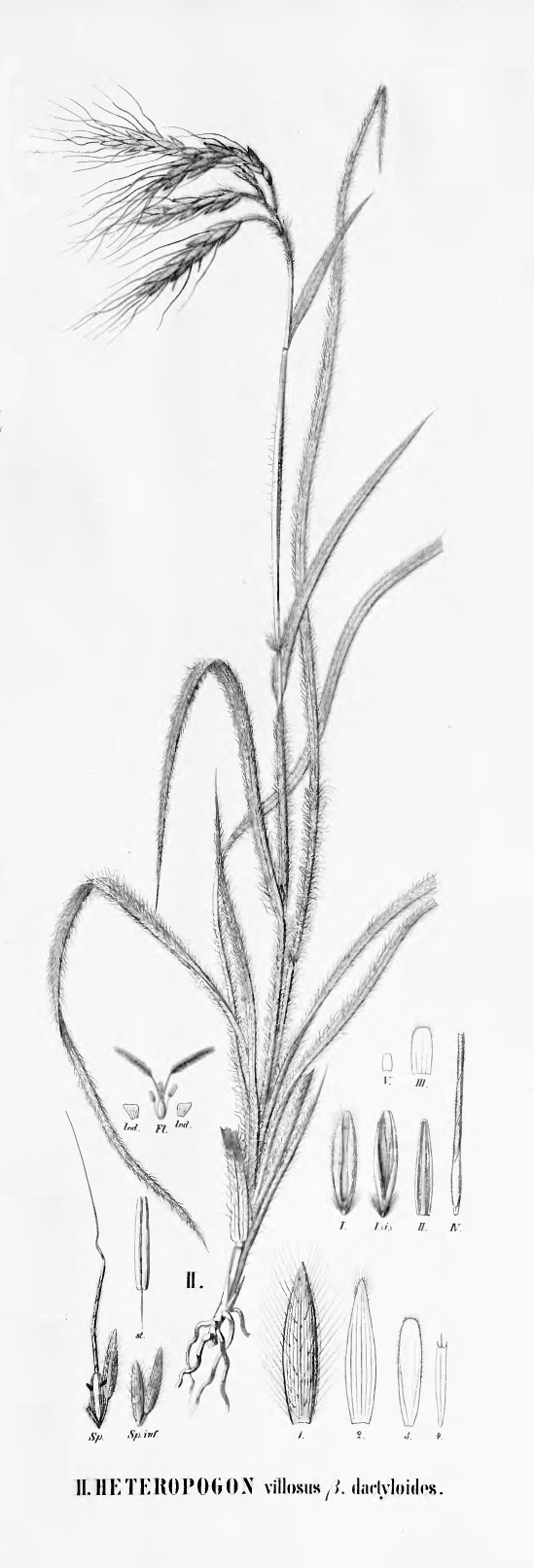
- Agenium villosum

Scientific classification
- Kingdom: Plantae
- Clade: Tracheophytes
- Clade: Angiosperms
- Clade: Monocots
- Clade: Commelinids
- Order: Poales
- Family: Poaceae
- Subfamily: Panicoideae
- Supertribe: Andropogonodae
- Tribe: Andropogoneae
- Subtribe: Saccharinae
- Genus: Agenium; Nees

Type species
- Agenium nutans (syn of A. villosum) Nees

= Agenium =

Genus of grasses

Agenium is a genus of grasses. Species of the genus are found in South America.

Species

- Agenium leptocladum (Hack.) Clayton - Brazil (São Paulo, Santa Catarina, D.F., Goiás, Mato Grosso, Minas Gerais, Paraná), Argentina (Misiones, Corrientes), Paraguay, Bolivia (Santa Cruz)
- Agenium majus Pilg. - Brazil (Mato Grosso do Sul), Paraguay
- Agenium villosum (Nees) Pilg. - Brazil, Bolivia (Santa Cruz), Paraguay, Uruguay, Argentina

== See also ==
- List of Poaceae genera
