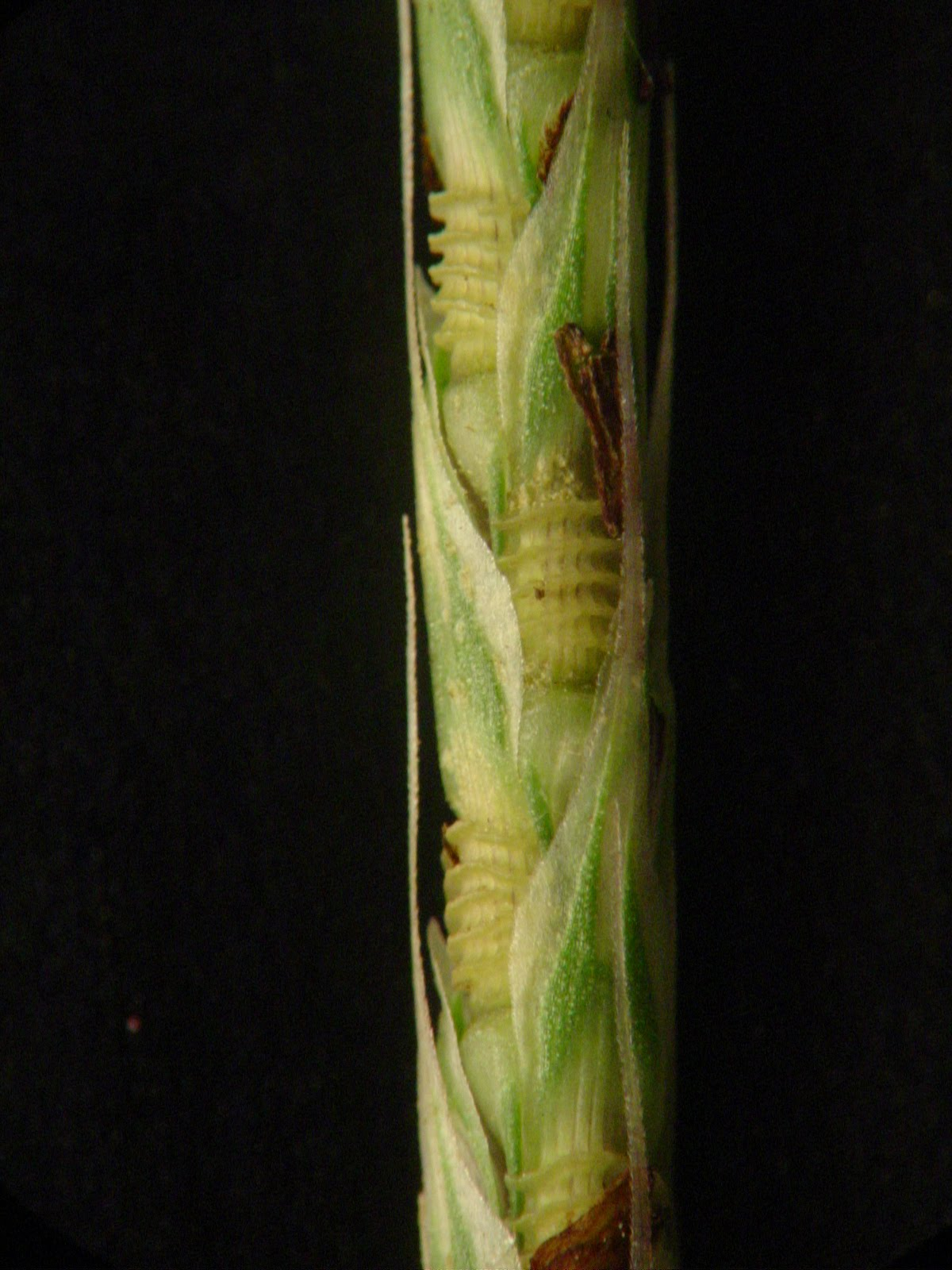
- Glyphochloa acuminata: close view of inflorescence (raceme) showing spikelets

Scientific classification
- Kingdom: Plantae
- Clade: Tracheophytes
- Clade: Angiosperms
- Clade: Monocots
- Clade: Commelinids
- Order: Poales
- Family: Poaceae
- Subfamily: Panicoideae
- Supertribe: Andropogonodae
- Tribe: Andropogoneae
- Subtribe: Rottboelliinae
- Genus: Glyphochloa; Clayton

Type species
- Glyphochloa forficulata (C.E.C.Fisch.) Clayton

= Glyphochloa =

Genus of grasses

Glyphochloa is a genus of Indian plants in the grass family.

Species

- Glyphochloa acuminata (Hack.) Clayton - Maharashtra
- Glyphochloa divergens (Hack.) Clayton - Karnataka
- Glyphochloa forficulata (C.E.C.Fisch.) Clayton - Maharashtra, Tamil Nadu
- Glyphochloa goaensis (R.S.Rao & Hemadri) Clayton - Goa
- Glyphochloa henryi Janarth., V.C.Joshi, S.Rajkumar - Goa
- Glyphochloa maharashtraensis G.G.Potdar & S.R.Yadav - Maharashtra
- Glyphochloa mysorensis (S.K.Jain & Hemadri) Clayton - Karnataka
- Glyphochloa ratnagirica (B.G.Kulk. & Hemadri) Clayton - Maharashtra
- Glyphochloa santapaui (S.K.Jain & Deshp.) Clayton - Maharashtra
- Glyphochloa talbotii (Hook.f.) Clayton - Maharashtra
- Glyphochloa veldkampii M.A.Fonseca & Janarth. - Goa

== See also[edit] ==
- Tribe Andropogoneae
- List of Poaceae genera
