= Veldkampia =

Scientific classification
- Kingdom: Plantae
- Clade: Tracheophytes
- Clade: Angiosperms
- Clade: Monocots
- Clade: Commelinids
- Order: Poales
- Family: Poaceae
- Subfamily: Panicoideae
- Supertribe: Andropogonodae
- Tribe: Andropogoneae
- Subtribe: Saccharinae
- Genus: Veldkampia; Ibaragi & Shiro Kobay (2008)
- Species: V. sagaingensis

Binomial name
- Veldkampia sagaingensis Ibaragi & Shiro Kobay (2008)

Genus of flowering plants

Veldkampia is a monotypic genus of flowering plants belonging to the family Poaceae. It contains only one known species, Veldkampia sagaingensis. It is an annual grass endemic to Myanmar.

The genus was circumscribed by Yasushi Ibaragi and Shiro Kobayashi in J. Jap. Bot. vol.83 on page 108 in 2008.

The genus name of Veldkampia is in honour of Jan Frederik Veldkamp (1941-2017), who was a British botanist and chemist.
