= Pseudanthistiria =

Scientific classification
- Kingdom: Plantae
- Clade: Tracheophytes
- Clade: Angiosperms
- Clade: Monocots
- Clade: Commelinids
- Order: Poales
- Family: Poaceae
- Subfamily: Panicoideae
- Supertribe: Andropogonodae
- Tribe: Andropogoneae
- Subtribe: Andropogoninae
- Genus: Pseudanthistiria (Hack.) Hook.f.

Type species
- Pseudanthistiria heteroclita (Roxb.) Hook.f.

Synonyms
- Andropogon sect. Pseudanthistiria Hack.

Genus of grasses

Pseudanthistiria is a genus of Asian plants in the grass family.

Species

- Pseudanthistiria burmanica Hook.f. - Myanmar, Thailand
- Pseudanthistiria heteroclita (Roxb.) Hook.f. - India, Bangladesh
- Pseudanthistiria umbellata (Hack.) Hook.f. - India, Sri Lanka

formerly included

see Themeda

- Pseudanthistiria emeinica - Themeda villosa
