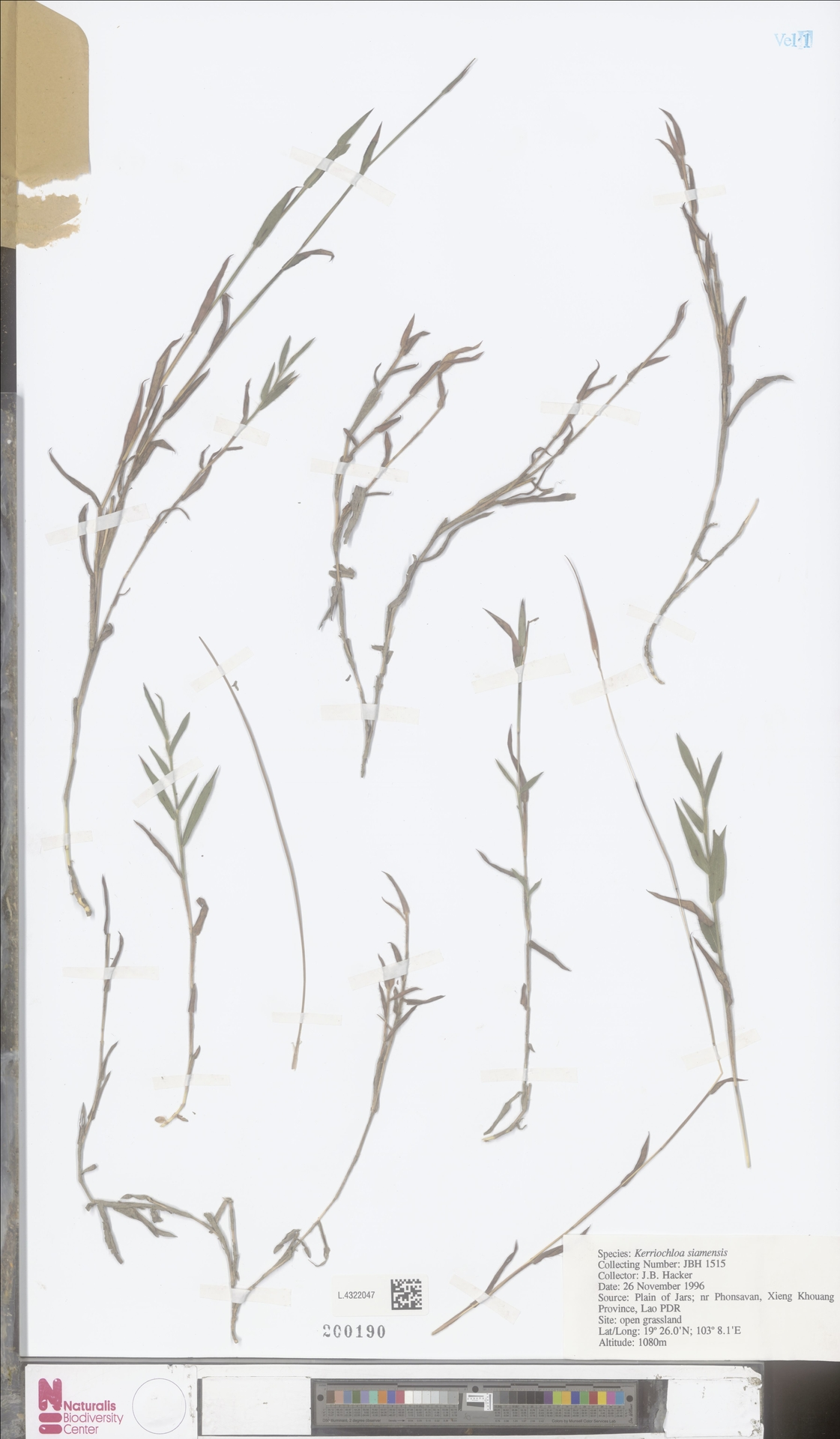

Scientific classification
- Kingdom: Plantae
- Clade: Tracheophytes
- Clade: Angiosperms
- Clade: Monocots
- Clade: Commelinids
- Order: Poales
- Family: Poaceae
- Subfamily: Panicoideae
- Supertribe: Andropogonodae
- Tribe: Andropogoneae
- Subtribe: Ischaeminae
- Genus: Kerriochloa; C.E.Hubb.
- Species: K. siamensis

Binomial name
- Kerriochloa siamensis C.E.Hubb.

Synonyms
- Ischaemum siamense (C.E.Hubb.) Roberty; Kerriochloa siamensis var. dalatensis A.Camus; Kerriochloa siamensis var. sabulicola A.Camus

= Kerriochloa =

Genus of grasses

Kerriochloa is a genus of Southeast Asian plants in the grass family. The only known species is Kerriochloa siamensis, native to Thailand and Vietnam.

The genus name of Kerriochloa is in honour of Arthur Francis George Kerr (1877–1942), an Irish medical doctor. The Latin specific epithet of siamensis means coming from Siam (the old name for Thailand. Both genus and species were first described and published in Hooker's Icon. Pl. Vol.35 on table 3494 in 1950.

== See also ==
- Andropogoneae
- List of Poaceae genera
