= Ratzeburgia =

Scientific classification
- Kingdom: Plantae
- Clade: Tracheophytes
- Clade: Angiosperms
- Clade: Monocots
- Clade: Commelinids
- Order: Poales
- Family: Poaceae
- Subfamily: Panicoideae
- Supertribe: Andropogonodae
- Tribe: Andropogoneae
- Subtribe: Rottboelliinae
- Genus: Ratzeburgia; Kunth
- Species: R. pulcherrima

Binomial name
- Ratzeburgia pulcherrima Kunth

Synonyms
- Aikinia Wall.; Ophiuros auriculatus Trin.; Mnesithea pulcherrima (Kunth) de Koning & Sosef; Aikinia elegans Wall.; Rottboellia pulcherrima Wall. ex Kunth; Rottboellia elegans (Wall.) Roberty

Genus of grasses

Ratzeburgia is a genus of plants in the grass family.

== Species ==
The only known species is Ratzeburgia pulcherrima, found only in Myanmar.

== Formerly included ==
see Elionurus

- Ratzeburgia schimperi - Elionurus royleanus
