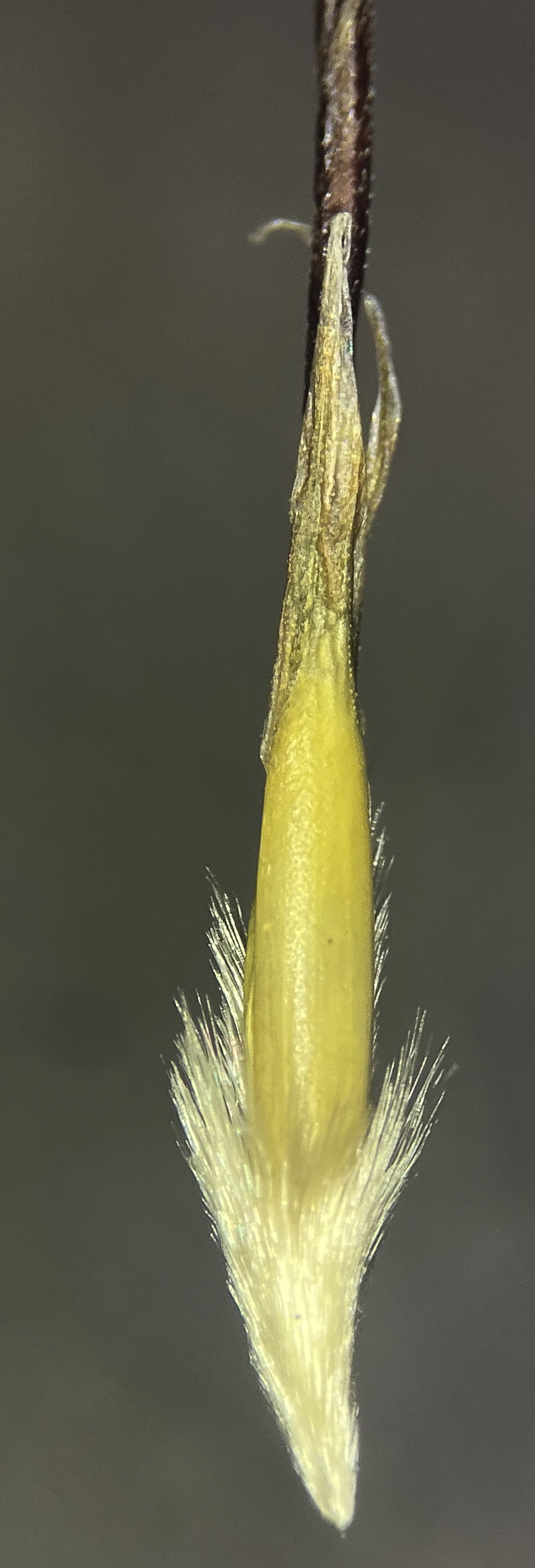

Scientific classification
- Kingdom: Plantae
- Clade: Tracheophytes
- Clade: Angiosperms
- Clade: Monocots
- Clade: Commelinids
- Order: Poales
- Family: Poaceae
- Subfamily: Panicoideae
- Supertribe: Andropogonodae
- Tribe: Andropogoneae
- Subtribe: Andropogoninae
- Genus: Bhidea; Stapf ex Bor

Type species
- Bhidea burnsiana Bor

= Bhidea =

Genus of grasses

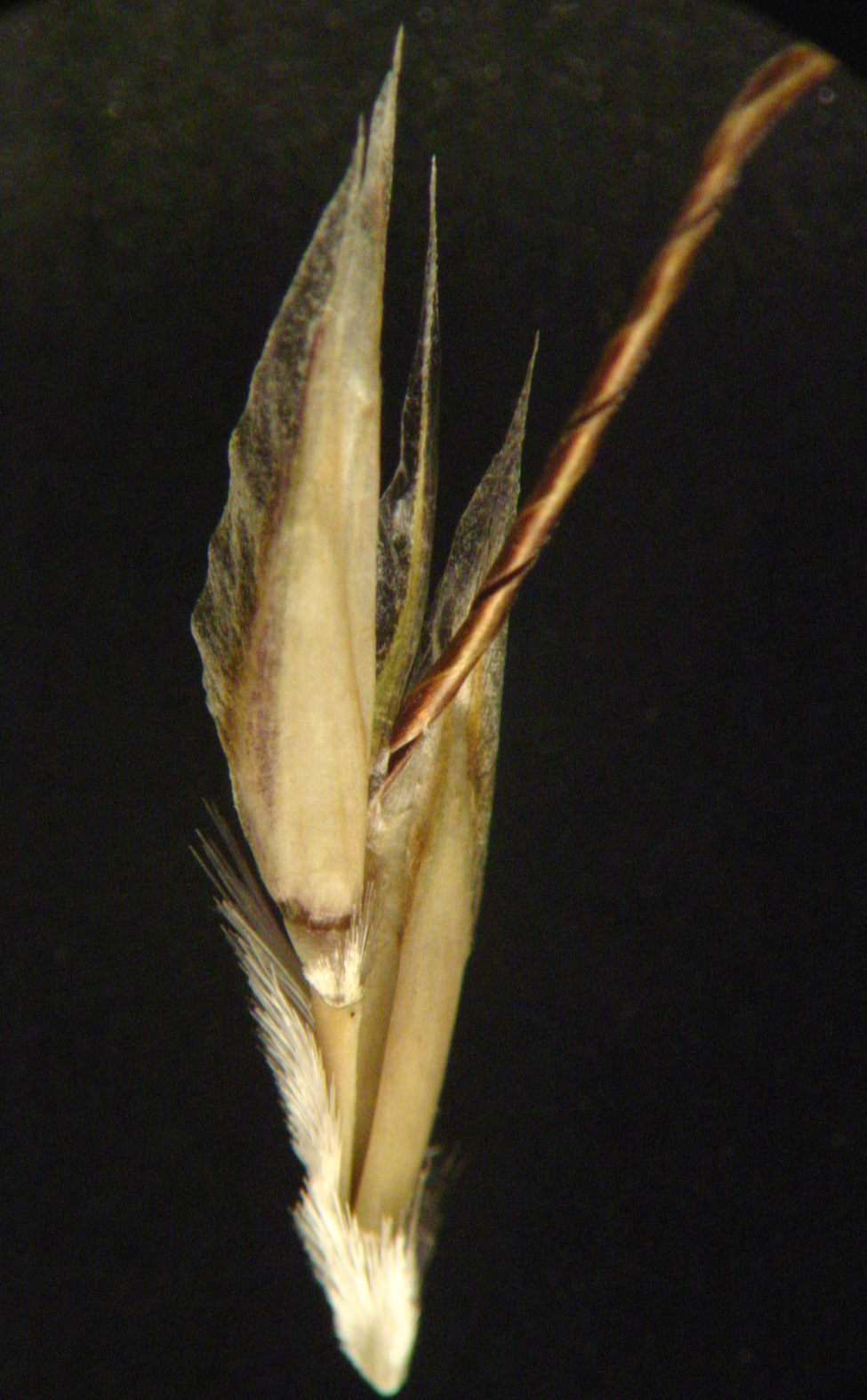
Bhidea burnsiana Bor: Close view of paired spikelets

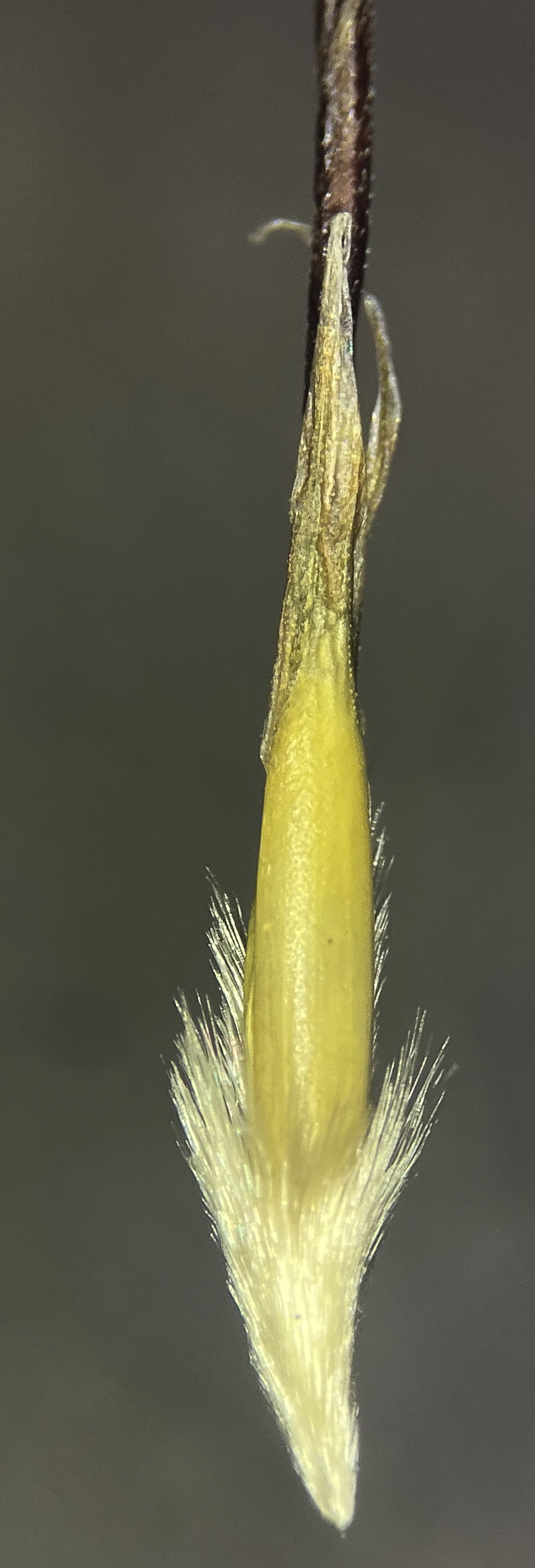
Bhidea fischeri Sreek. & B. V. Shetty

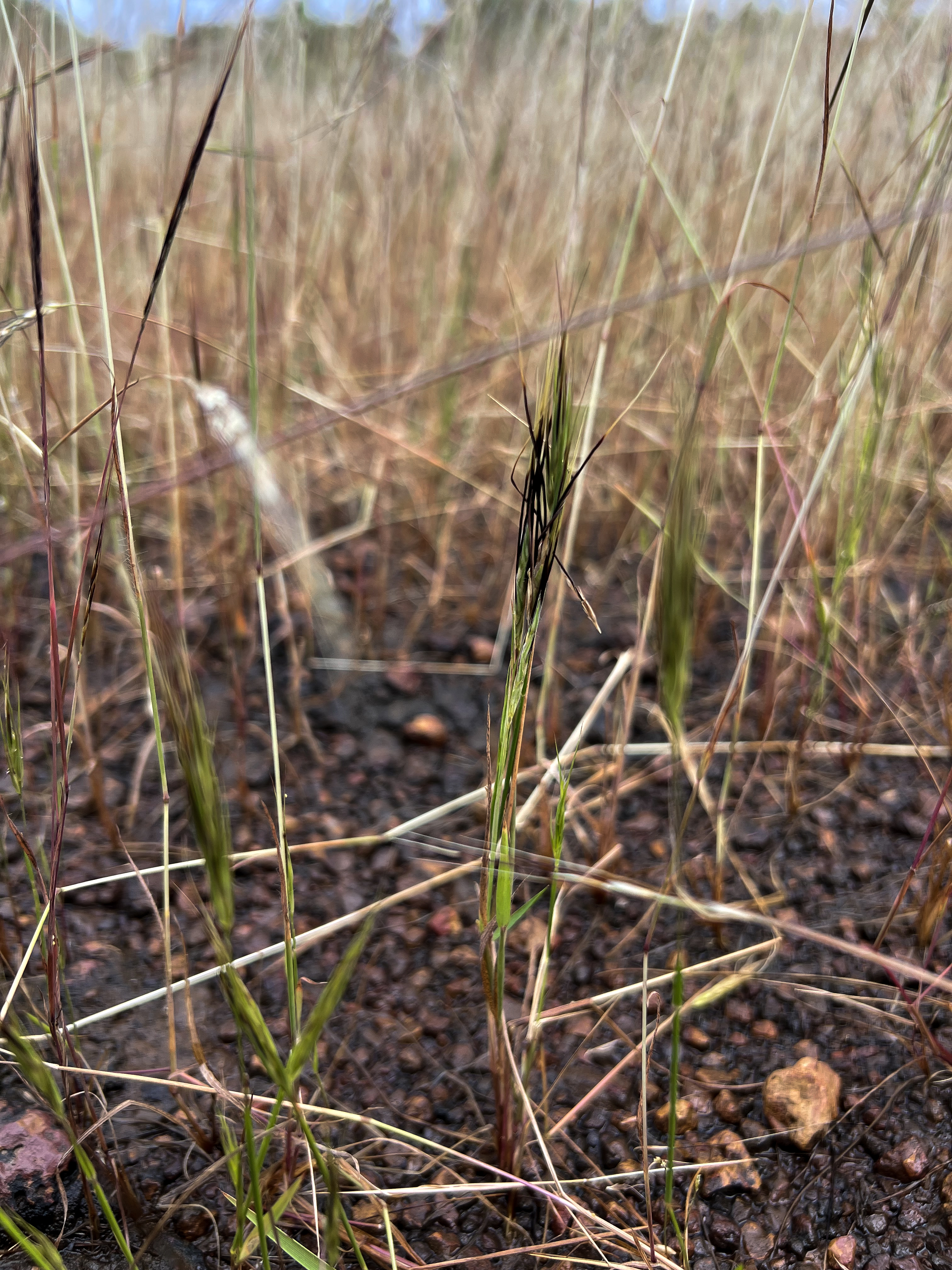
Bhidea fischeri Sreek. & B. V. Shetty from open low elevation grassland in Ratnagiri district, Maharashtra state, India.

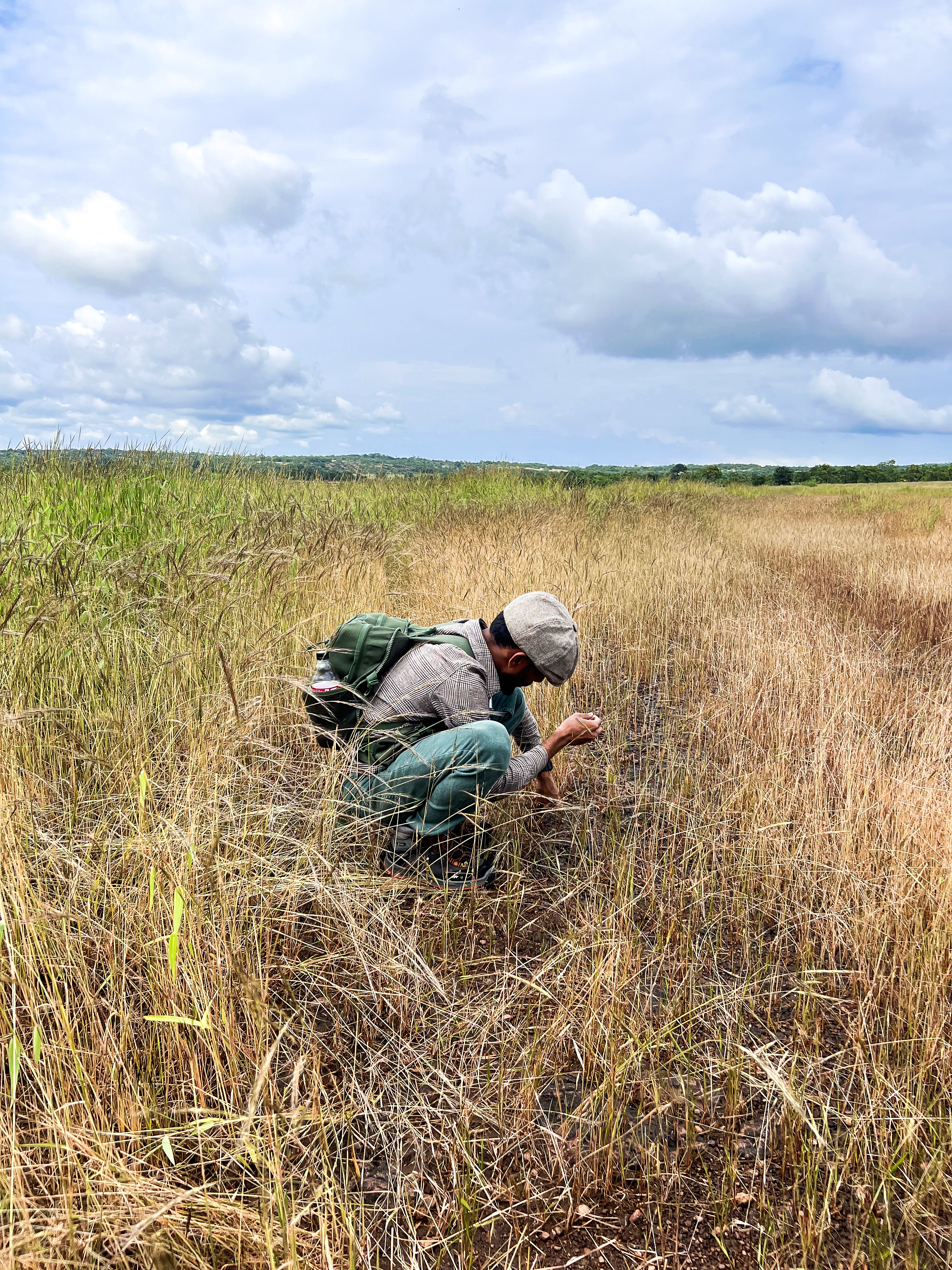
Collecting Bhidea fischeri Sreek. & B. V. Shetty from open grassland, Konkan.

Bhidea is a genus of Indian plants in the grass family.

Species

- Bhidea borii Deshp., V.Prakash & N.P.Singh
- Bhidea burnsiana Bor
- Bhidea fischeri Sreek. & B.V.Shetty

== See also ==
- List of Poaceae genera
- Tribe Andropogoneae
