= Pseudodichanthium =

Scientific classification
- Kingdom: Plantae
- Clade: Tracheophytes
- Clade: Angiosperms
- Clade: Monocots
- Clade: Commelinids
- Order: Poales
- Family: Poaceae
- Subfamily: Panicoideae
- Supertribe: Andropogonodae
- Tribe: Andropogoneae
- Subtribe: Saccharinae
- Genus: Pseudodichanthium; Bor
- Species: P. serrafalcoides

Binomial name
- Pseudodichanthium serrafalcoides (Cooke & Stapf) Bor

Synonyms
- Andropogon serrafalcoides Cooke & Stapf; Dichanthium serrafalcoides (Cooke & Stapf) Blatt. & McCann; Pseudodichanthium cookei M.R.Almeida; Andropogon cookei Stapf ex Woodrow

Genus of grasses

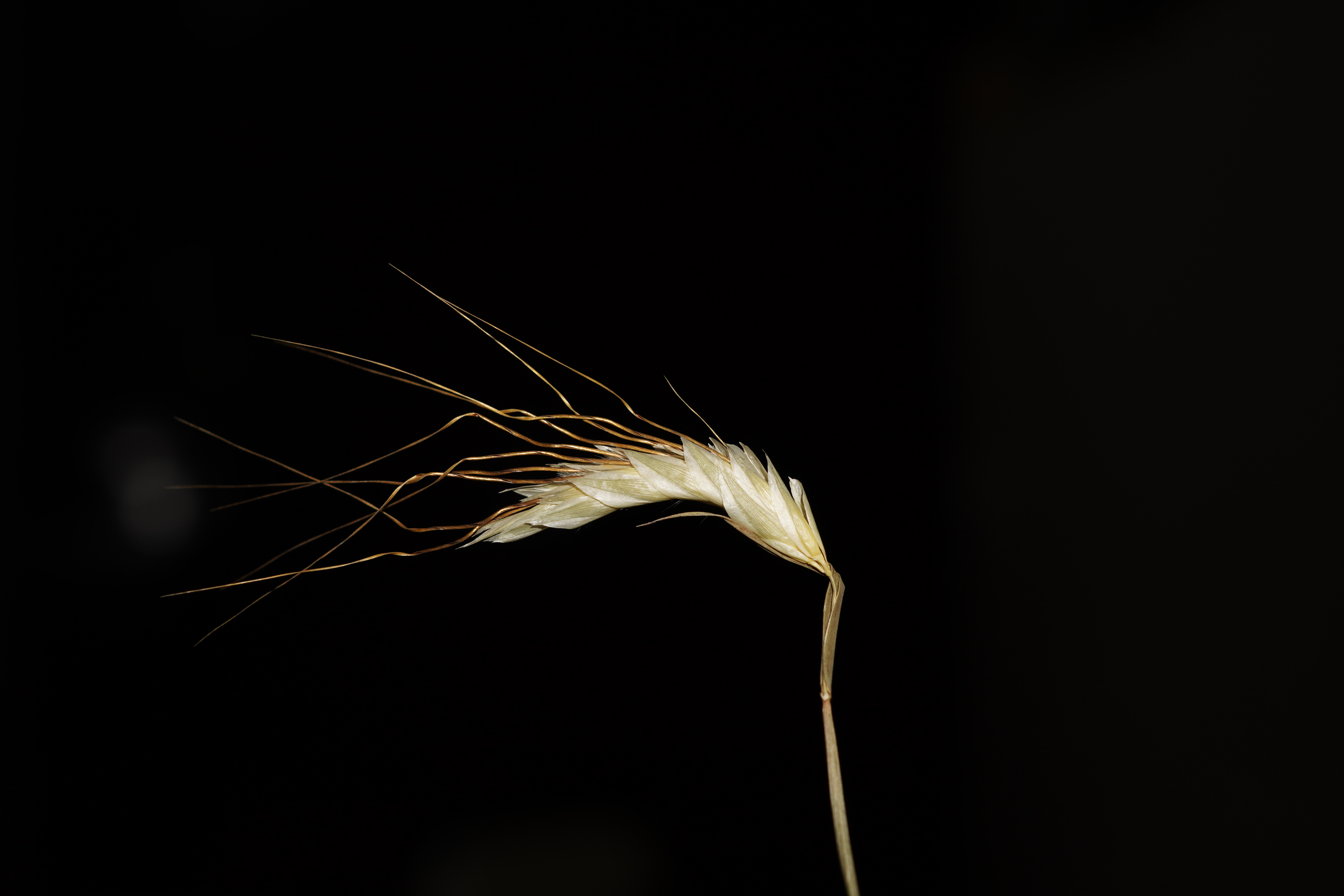
Pseudodichanthium serrafalcoides (Cooke & Stapf) Bor

Pseudodichanthium is a genus of Asian plants in the grass family. The only known species is Pseudodichanthium serrafalcoides, native to Maharashtra and Oman.
