= Hemisorghum =

Scientific classification
- Kingdom: Plantae
- Clade: Tracheophytes
- Clade: Angiosperms
- Clade: Monocots
- Clade: Commelinids
- Order: Poales
- Family: Poaceae
- Subfamily: Panicoideae
- Supertribe: Andropogonodae
- Tribe: Andropogoneae
- Subtribe: Saccharinae
- Genus: Hemisorghum; C.E.Hubb. ex Bor

Type species
- Hemisorghum mekongense (A.Camus) C.E.Hubb. ex Bor

Synonyms
- Lakshmia Veldkamp

Genus of grasses

Hemisorghum is a genus of Asian plants in the grass family.

Species

- Hemisorghum mekongense (A.Camus) C.E.Hubb. ex Bor - Laos, Myanmar, Thailand, Vietnam
- Hemisorghum venustum (Thwaites) Clayton - Sri Lanka, Tamil Nadu
