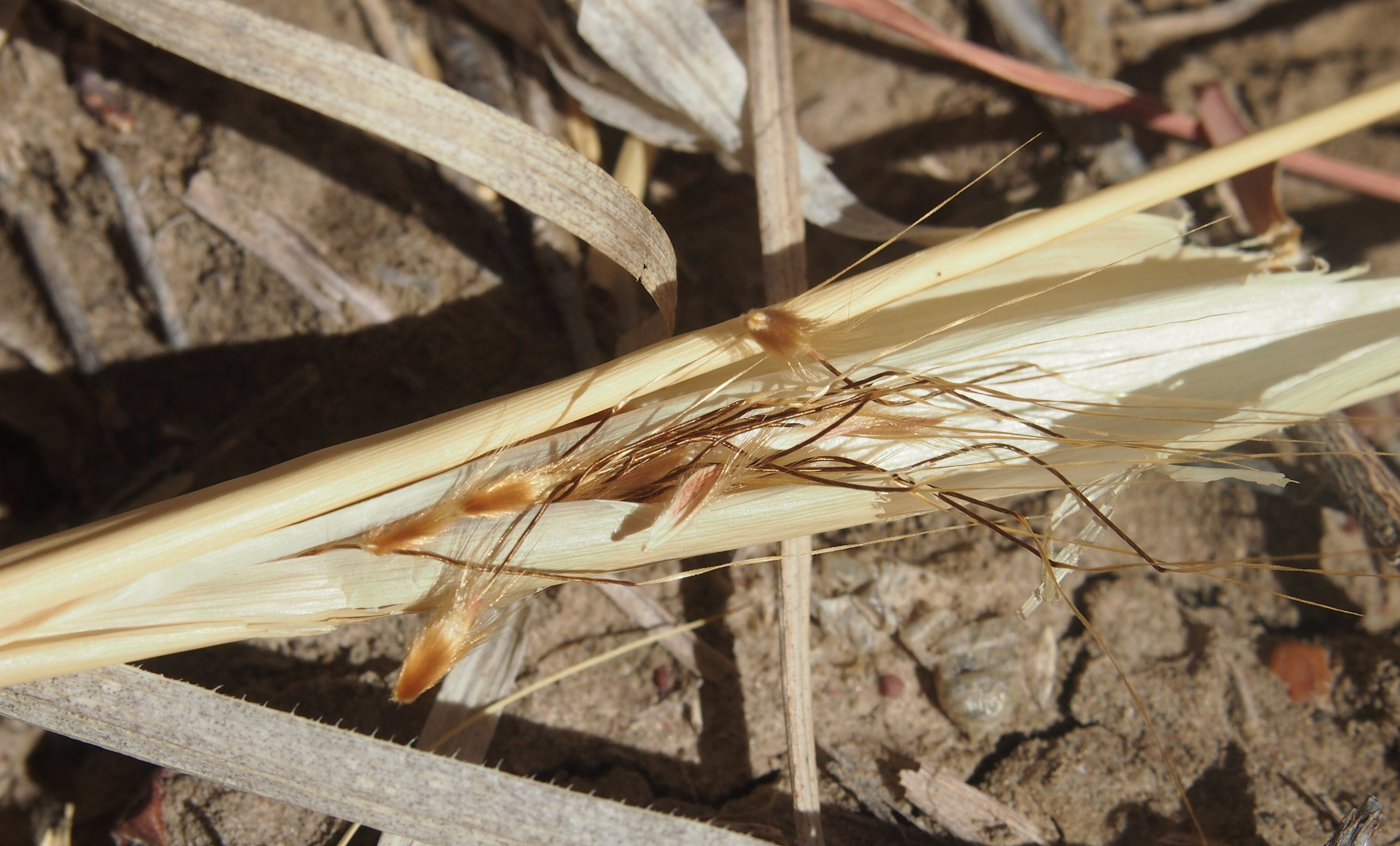

Scientific classification
- Kingdom: Plantae
- Clade: Tracheophytes
- Clade: Angiosperms
- Clade: Monocots
- Clade: Commelinids
- Order: Poales
- Family: Poaceae
- Subfamily: Panicoideae
- Supertribe: Andropogonodae
- Tribe: Andropogoneae
- Subtribe: Andropogoninae
- Genus: Spathia; Ewart & Archer
- Species: S. neurosa

Binomial name
- Spathia neurosa Ewart & Archer

= Spathia =

Genus of grasses

Spathia is a genus of plants in the grass family. The only known species is Spathia neurosa, native to northern Australia (Queensland, Northern Territory, and Western Australia).
