= Cleistachne =

Scientific classification
- Kingdom: Plantae
- Clade: Embryophytes
- Clade: Tracheophytes
- Clade: Spermatophytes
- Clade: Angiosperms
- Clade: Monocots
- Clade: Commelinids
- Order: Poales
- Family: Poaceae
- Subfamily: Panicoideae
- Supertribe: Andropogonodae
- Tribe: Andropogoneae
- Subtribe: Saccharinae
- Genus: Cleistachne; Benth.
- Species: C. sorghoides

Binomial name
- Cleistachne sorghoides Benth.

Genus of grasses

Cleistachne is a genus of African and Asian plants in the grass family. The only known species is Cleistachne sorghoides, native to Eastern Africa and Southeastern Africa (from Ethiopia to Mpumalanga), and parts of Asia (Oman, Odisha State in India).
