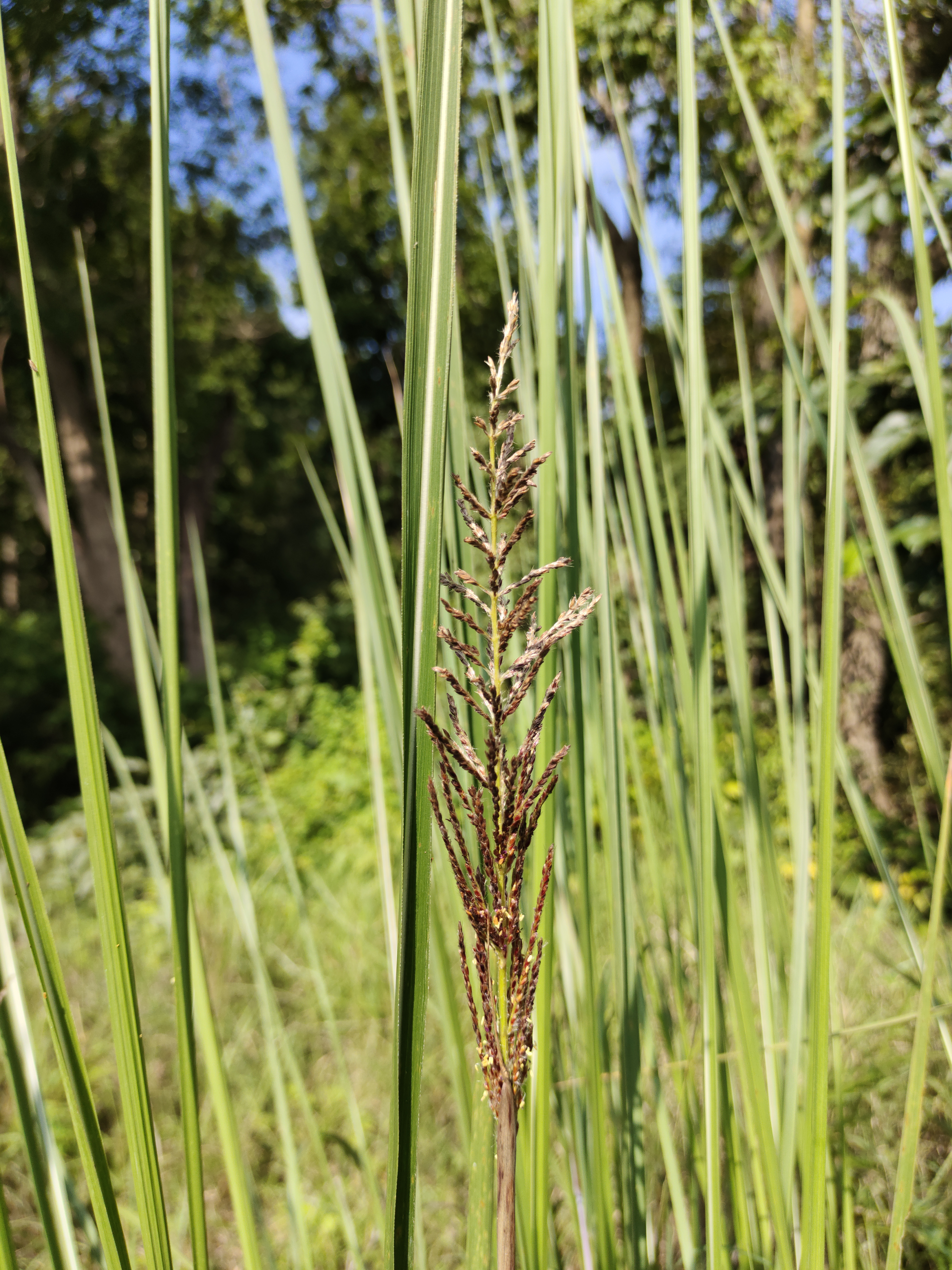
- Narenga porphyrocoma inflorescence

Scientific classification
- Kingdom: Plantae
- Clade: Tracheophytes
- Clade: Angiosperms
- Clade: Monocots
- Clade: Commelinids
- Order: Poales
- Family: Poaceae
- Subfamily: Panicoideae
- Supertribe: Andropogonodae
- Tribe: Andropogoneae
- Subtribe: Saccharinae
- Genus: Narenga; Bor

= Narenga (plant) =

Genus of flowering plants

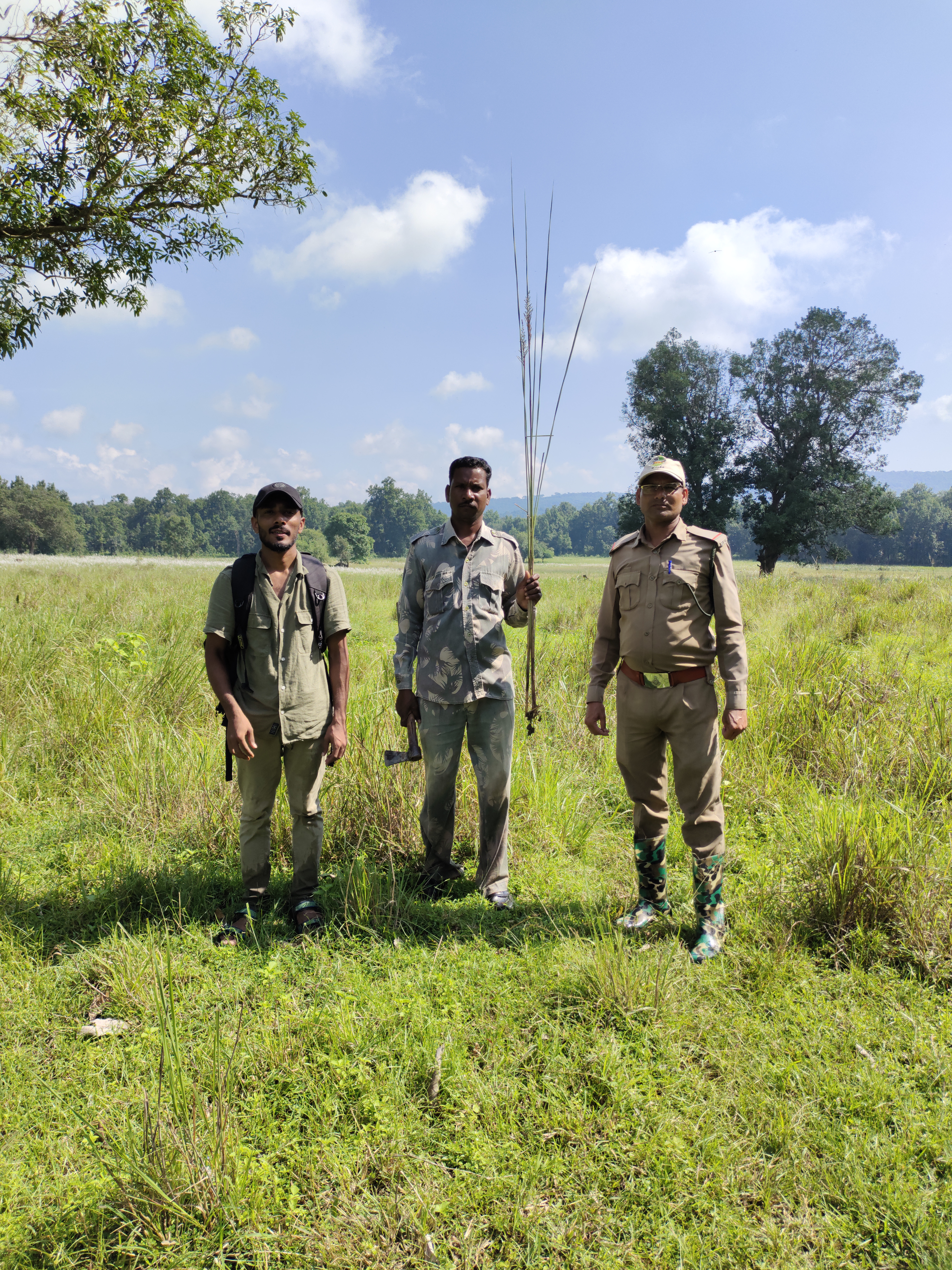
Narenga porphyrocoma in field Mr. Shahid Nawaz Landge on the left hand side

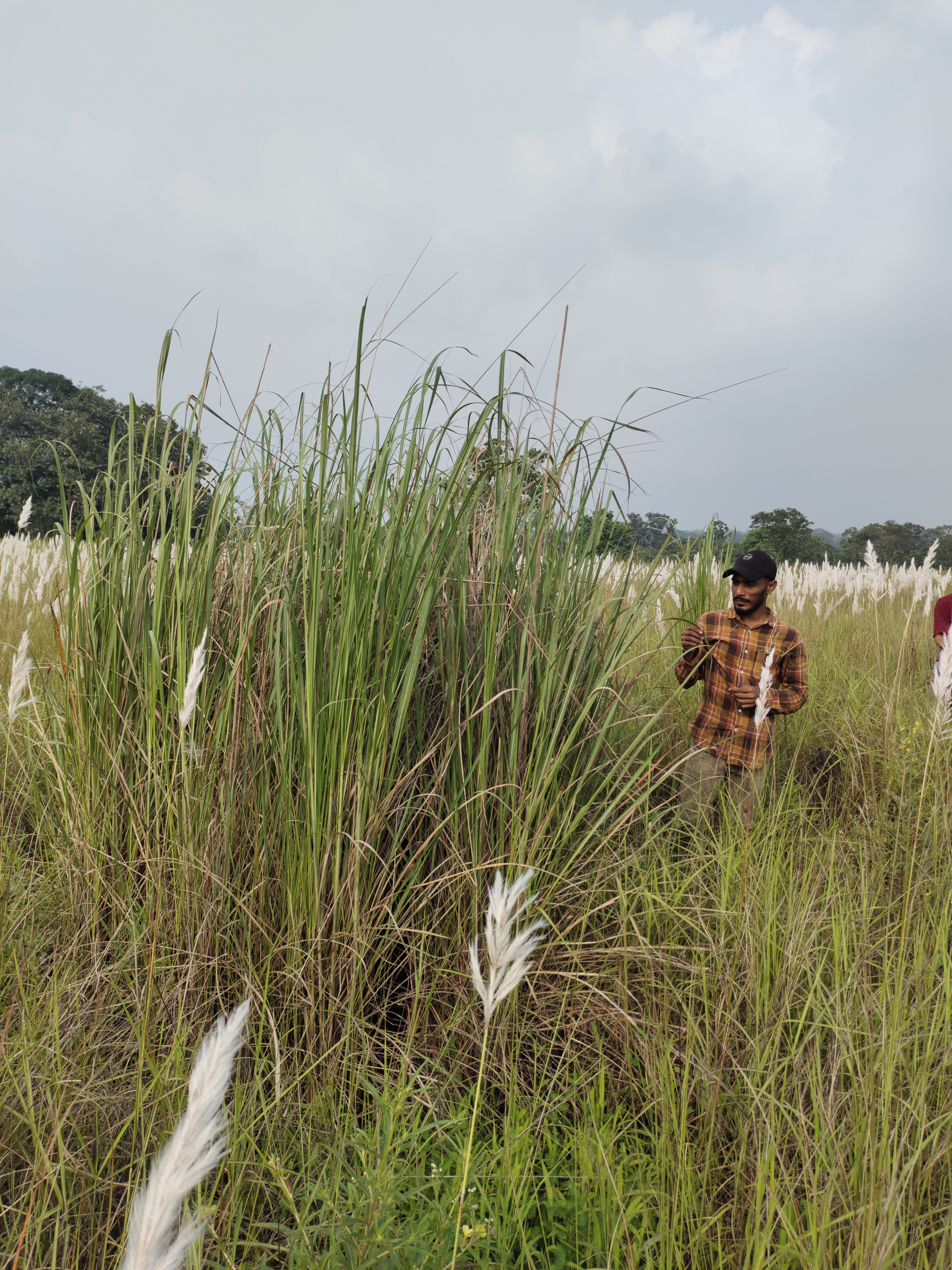
Narenga porphyrocoma in Kanha Tiger Reserve, Madhya Pradesh, India

Narenga is a genus of grasses. It includes two species native to Ethiopia and tropical and subtropical Asia.

- Narenga fallax (Balansa) Bor
- Narenga porphyrocoma (Hance) Bor
