= Pseudosorghum =

Scientific classification
- Kingdom: Plantae
- Clade: Tracheophytes
- Clade: Angiosperms
- Clade: Monocots
- Clade: Commelinids
- Order: Poales
- Family: Poaceae
- Subfamily: Panicoideae
- Supertribe: Andropogonodae
- Tribe: Andropogoneae
- Subtribe: Saccharinae
- Genus: Pseudosorghum; A.Camus

Type species
- Pseudosorghum fasciculare (Roxb.) A.Camus

Genus of grasses

Pseudosorghum is a genus of Asian plants in the grass family.

Species

- Pseudosorghum fasciculare (Roxb.) A.Camus - Yunnan, India, Bangladesh, Nepal, Bhutan, Myanmar, Philippines, Thailand, Vietnam
- Pseudosorghum zollingeri (Steud.) A.Camus - Myanmar, Philippines, Yunnan, Thailand, Vietnam, Java

formerly included

see Saccharum

- Pseudosorghum hildebrandtii - Saccharum hildebrandtii - Madagascar
