= Oxyrhachis =

Scientific classification
- Kingdom: Plantae
- Clade: Tracheophytes
- Clade: Angiosperms
- Clade: Monocots
- Clade: Commelinids
- Order: Poales
- Family: Poaceae
- Subfamily: Panicoideae
- Tribe: Andropogoneae
- Subtribe: Tripsacinae
- Genus: Oxyrhachis; Pilg.
- Species: O. gracillima

Binomial name
- Oxyrhachis gracillima (Baker) C.E.Hubb.

Synonyms
- Rottboellia gracillima Baker; Oxyrhachis mildbraediana Pilg. (type species of Oxyrhachis); Oxyrhachis gracillima subsp. occidentalis Gledhill

Species of plant

Oxyrhachis is a genus of African plants in the grass family. The only known species is Oxyrhachis gracillima, native to Sierra Leone, Nigeria, Cameroon, Tanzania, Madagascar, KwaZulu-Natal, Cape Province.
