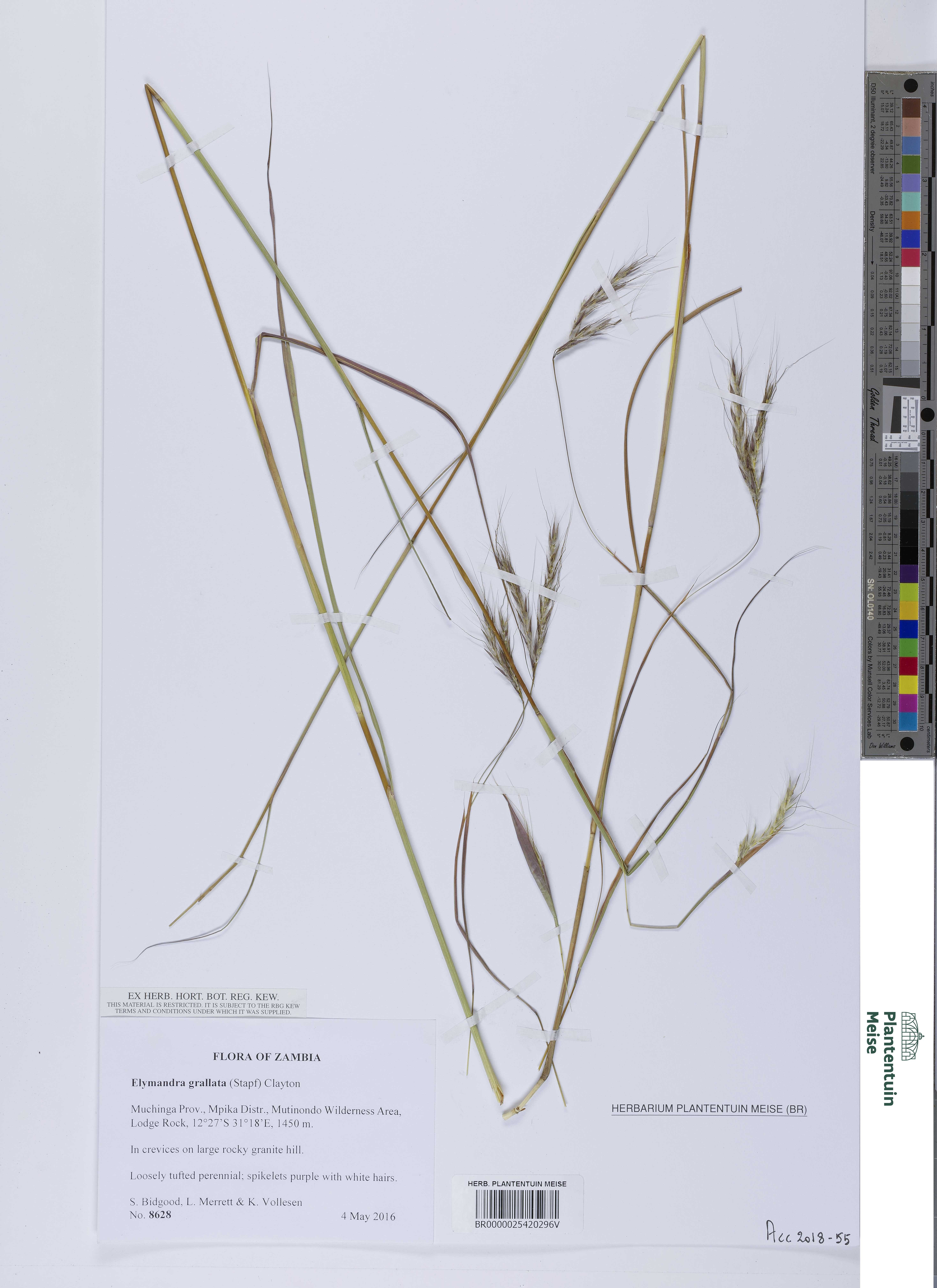
- Elymandra grallata

Scientific classification
- Kingdom: Plantae
- Clade: Tracheophytes
- Clade: Angiosperms
- Clade: Monocots
- Clade: Commelinids
- Order: Poales
- Family: Poaceae
- Subfamily: Panicoideae
- Supertribe: Andropogonodae
- Tribe: Andropogoneae
- Subtribe: Andropogoninae
- Genus: Elymandra; Stapf

Type species
- Elymandra androphila (Stapf) Stapf

Synonyms
- Pleiadelphia Stapf

= Elymandra =

Genus of grasses

Elymandra is a genus of African and South American plants in the grass family. Most known species are native to Africa; one is found in Brazil.

Species

- Elymandra androphila (Stapf) Stapf - from Senegal to Angola
- Elymandra archaelymandra (Jacq.-Fél.) Clayton - Guinea, Senegal, Benin, Sierra Leone
- Elymandra gossweileri (Stapf) Clayton - from Senegal to Angola
- Elymandra grallata (Stapf) Clayton from Gambia to KwaZulu-Natal
- Elymandra lithophila (Trin.) Clayton - Brazil (State of Minas Gerais), Zaïre to Zimbabwe
- Elymandra subulata Jacq.-Fél. - Guinea, Ivory Coast, Sierra Leone
