= Clausospicula =

Scientific classification
- Kingdom: Plantae
- Clade: Tracheophytes
- Clade: Angiosperms
- Clade: Monocots
- Clade: Commelinids
- Order: Poales
- Family: Poaceae
- Subfamily: Panicoideae
- Supertribe: Andropogonodae
- Tribe: Andropogoneae
- Subtribe: Andropogoninae
- Genus: Clausospicula; Lazarides
- Species: C. extensa

Binomial name
- Clausospicula extensa Lazarides

Genus of grasses

Clausospicula is a genus of Australian plants in the grass family. The only known species is Clausospicula extensa, native to Northern Territory.
