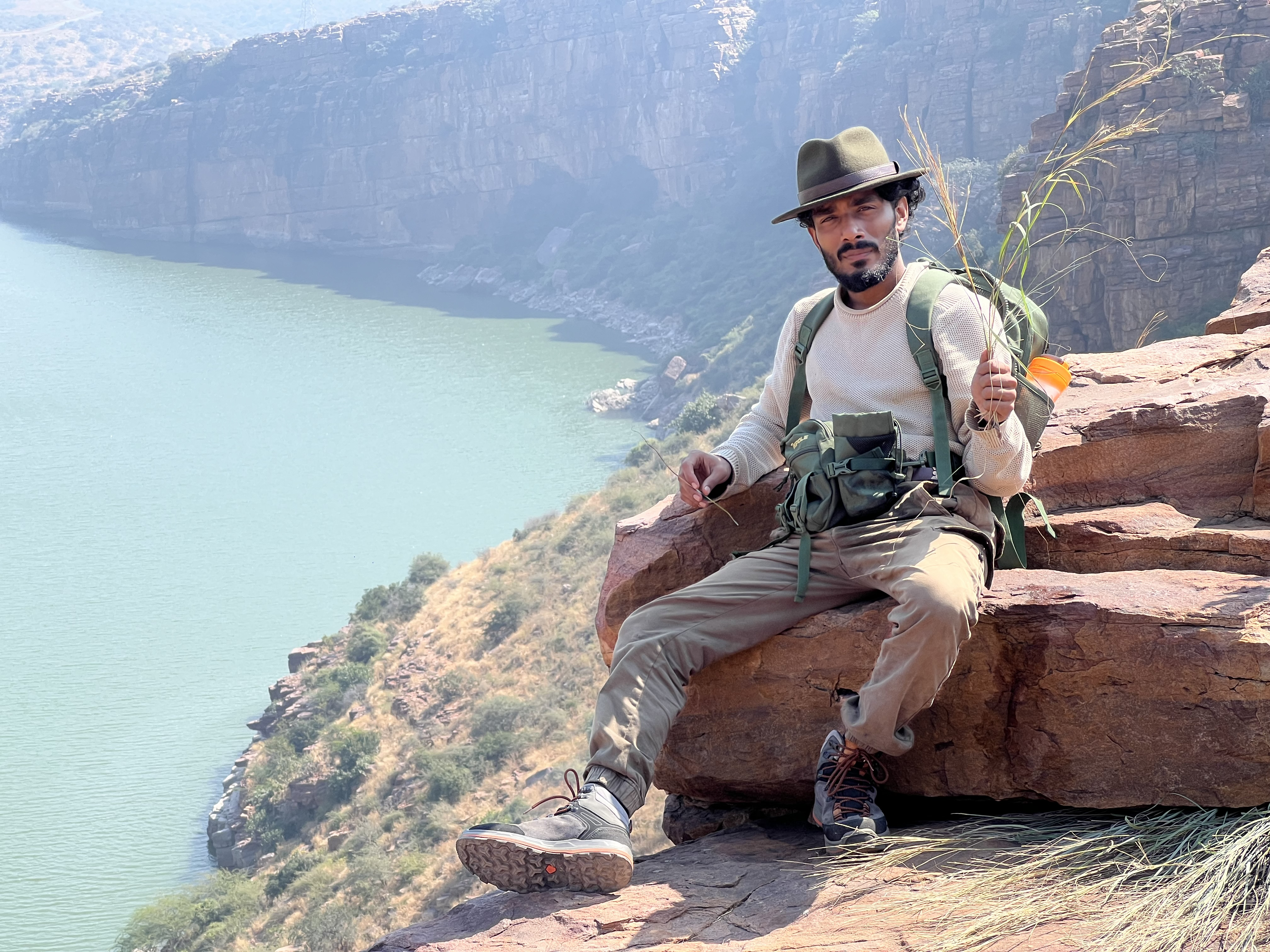
- Mr. Shahid Nawaz, an agrostologist, rediscovered Parahyparrhenia bellariensis (Hack.) Clayton after 184 years of its presumed extinction.

Scientific classification
- Kingdom: Plantae
- Clade: Tracheophytes
- Clade: Angiosperms
- Clade: Monocots
- Clade: Commelinids
- Order: Poales
- Family: Poaceae
- Subfamily: Panicoideae
- Supertribe: Andropogonodae
- Tribe: Andropogoneae
- Subtribe: Andropogoninae
- Genus: Parahyparrhenia; A.Camus

Type species
- Parahyparrhenia jaegeriana (syn of P. annua) A.Camus

= Parahyparrhenia =

Genus of grasses

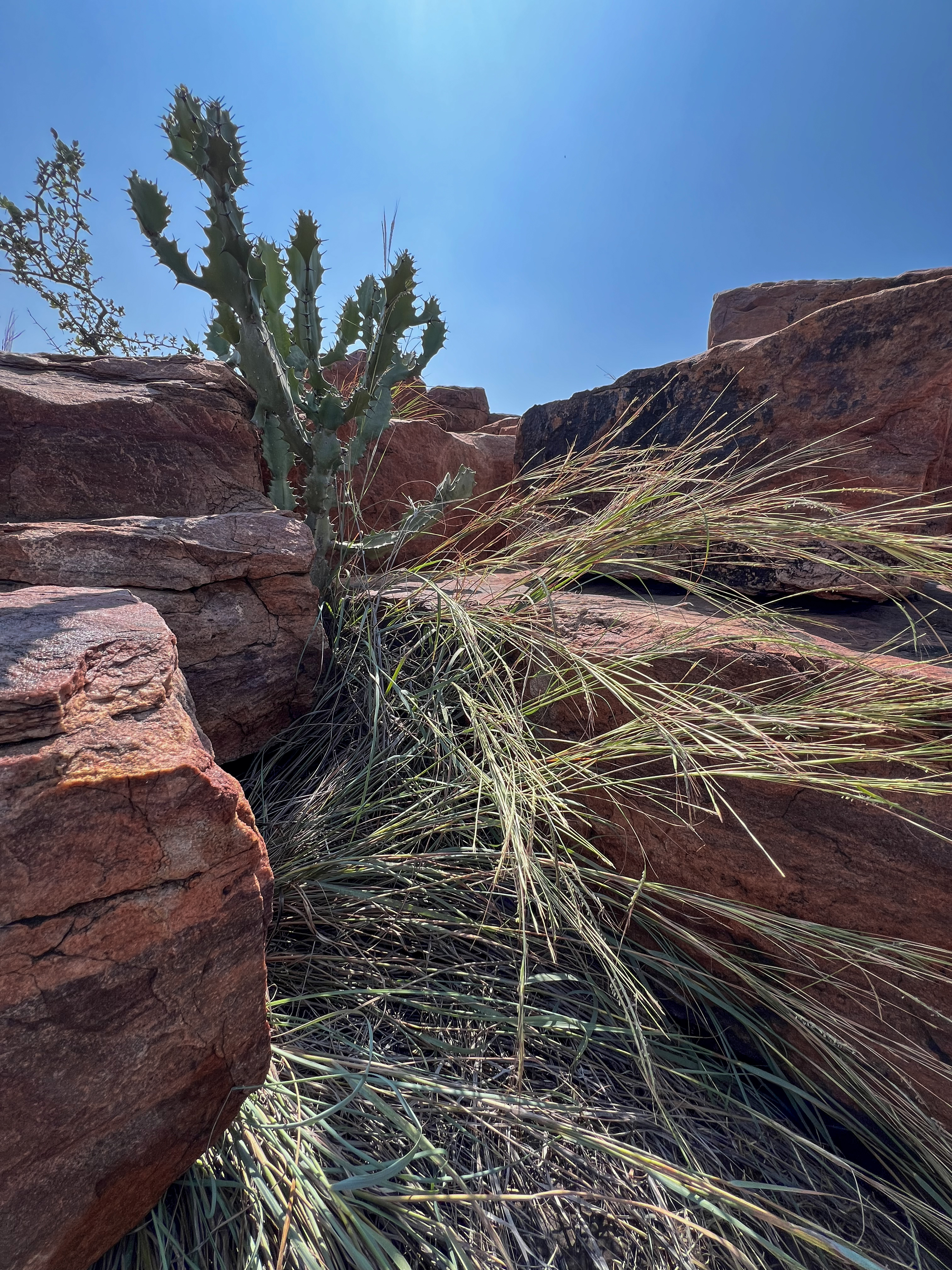
Parahyparrhenia bellariensis

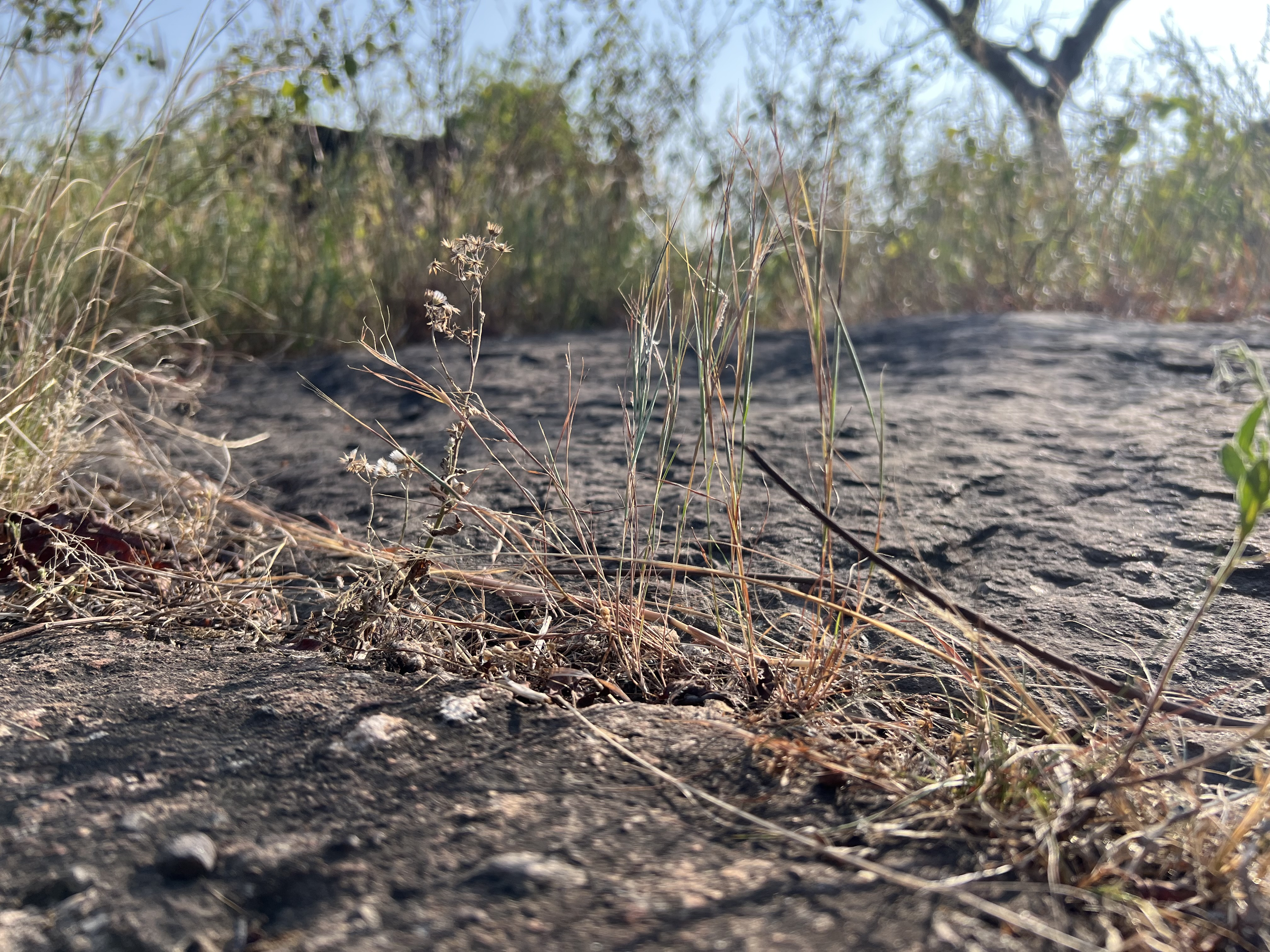
Parahyparrhenia khannae in its natural habitats

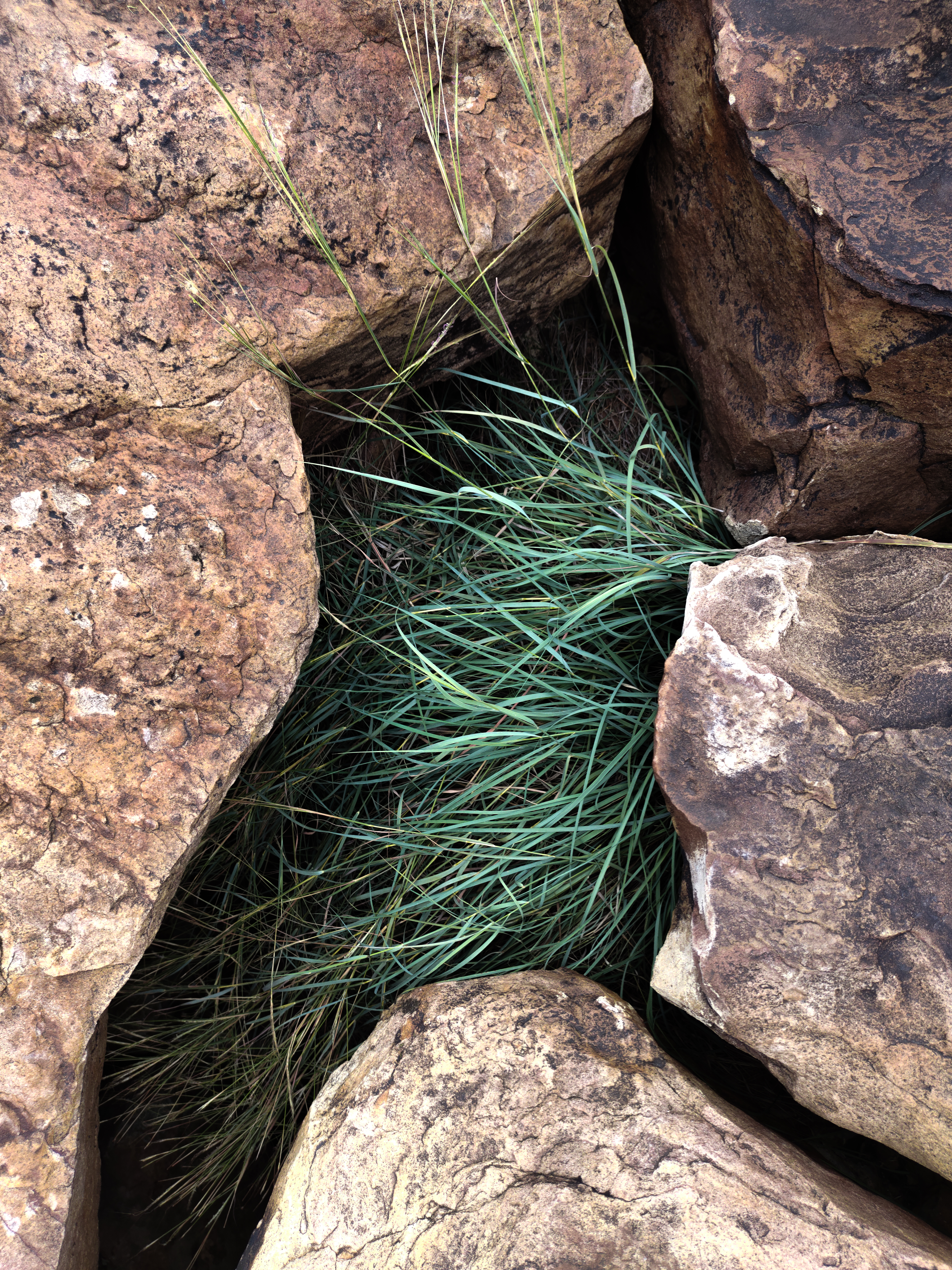
Parahyparrhenia bellariensis (Hack.) Clayton in the crevices of Quartzite rocks.

Parahyparrhenia is a genus of Afro-Asian plants in the grass family. Globally, the genus comprises seven species. Two species are known to occur in India, where they are narrow endemic. The species show disjunct distribution in Africa and Asia. Parahyparrhenia bellariensis (Hack.) Clayton an extremely rare grass which was presumed extinct was rediscovered after 184 years from Andhra Pradesh, South India. Mr. Shahid Nawaz, an agrostologist at the Blatter Herbarium, recollected the specimens of P. bellariensis. The species following its rediscovery, was preliminary classified as Critically Endangered (CR) by adhering to the guidelines of IUCN Criteria and Category.

Recently, the genus was revised by Mr. Shahid Nawaz, an Indian agrostologist, who also reviewed African and Thai species.

Species

- Parahyparrhenia annua (Hack.) Clayton - Sahara + Sahel regions of Africa
- Parahyparrhenia bellariensis (Hack.) Clayton - Andhra Pradesh
- Parahyparrhenia khannae A. P. Tiwari & Chorghe - Gujarat, Maharashtra, and Madhya Pradesh, India
- Parahyparrhenia laegaardii Veldkamp - Thailand
- Parahyparrhenia perennis Clayton - Burkina Faso, Guinea, Liberia, Senegal
- Parahyparrhenia siamensis Clayton - Thailand, Laos
- Parahyparrhenia tridentata Clayton - Thailand
