= Diectomis =

Scientific classification
- Kingdom: Plantae
- Clade: Tracheophytes
- Clade: Angiosperms
- Clade: Monocots
- Clade: Commelinids
- Order: Poales
- Family: Poaceae
- Subfamily: Panicoideae
- Supertribe: Andropogonodae
- Tribe: Andropogoneae
- Subtribe: Andropogoninae
- Genus: Diectomis; Kunth [1815], nom. cons., non P.Beauv. [1812]
- Species: D. fastigiata

Binomial name
- Diectomis fastigiata (Sw.) P.Beauv.

Synonyms
- Andropogon fastigiatus Sw.; Pollinia fastigiata (Sw.) Spreng.; Sorghum fastigiatum (Sw.) Kuntze; Cymbachne fastigiata (Sw.) Roberty; Diectomis fasciculata P.Beauv.; Andropogon diatherus Steud.; Andropogon hochstetteri Steud.; Heteropogon hochstetteri (Steud.) Andersson

Genus of plants

Diectomis is a genus of tropical plants in the grass family. The only known species is Diectomis fastigiata, widespread across tropical parts of Africa, Asia, and the Americas.
