= Asthenochloa =

Scientific classification
- Kingdom: Plantae
- Clade: Tracheophytes
- Clade: Angiosperms
- Clade: Monocots
- Clade: Commelinids
- Order: Poales
- Family: Poaceae
- Subfamily: Panicoideae
- Supertribe: Andropogonodae
- Tribe: Andropogoneae
- Subtribe: Saccharinae
- Genus: Asthenochloa; Buse
- Species: A. tenera

Binomial name
- Asthenochloa tenera Buse

Synonyms
- Garnotiella Stapf; Andropogon leptos Steud.; Chrysopogon tener Nees ex Steud.; Sorghum lepton (Steud.) Kuntze; Garnotiella philippinensis Stapf; Garnotia leptos (Steud.) Stapf; Garnotiella leptos (Steud.) Stapf

Genus of grasses

Asthenochloa is a monotypic genus of Southeast Asian plants in the grass family. The only known species is Asthenochloa tenera, native to Philippines, Sulawesi, Java, and the Lesser Sunda Islands.

== See also ==
- List of Poaceae genera
