= Lasiorhachis =

Scientific classification
- Kingdom: Plantae
- Clade: Tracheophytes
- Clade: Angiosperms
- Clade: Monocots
- Clade: Commelinids
- Order: Poales
- Family: Poaceae
- Subfamily: Panicoideae
- Genus: Lasiorhachis (Hack.) Stapf

Species
- See text.

Synonyms
- Andropogon subg. Lasiorhachis Hack.

Genus of plants

Lasiorhachis is a genus of flowering plant in the family Poaceae, native to Madagascar. The taxon was first described as a subdivision of Andropogon by Eduard Hackel in 1889 and raised to a genus by Otto Stapf in 1927.

== Species ==
As of September 2021, Plants of the World Online accepted the following species:

- Lasiorhachis hildebrandtii (Hack.) Stapf
- Lasiorhachis perrieri (A.Camus) Bosser
- Lasiorhachis viguieri (A.Camus) Bosser
