= Anadelphia =

Scientific classification
- Kingdom: Plantae
- Clade: Tracheophytes
- Clade: Angiosperms
- Clade: Monocots
- Clade: Commelinids
- Order: Poales
- Family: Poaceae
- Subfamily: Panicoideae
- Supertribe: Andropogonodae
- Tribe: Andropogoneae
- Subtribe: Andropogoninae
- Genus: Anadelphia; Hack.

Type species
- Anadelphia virgata Hack.

Synonyms
- Diectomis P.Beauv. 1812, rejected name not Kunth 1816; Monium Stapf; Pobeguinea Jacq.-Fél.

Genus of grasses

Anadelphia is a genus of African plants in the grass family.

Species

- Anadelphia afzeliana
- Anadelphia bigeniculata
- Anadelphia chevalieri
- Anadelphia funerea
- Anadelphia hamata
- Anadelphia leptocoma
- Anadelphia liebigiana
- Anadelphia macrochaeta
- Anadelphia polychaeta
- Anadelphia pumila
- Anadelphia scyphofera
- Anadelphia trepidaria
- Anadelphia trichaeta
- Anadelphia trispiculata

formerly included

see Schizachyrium

- Anadelphia lomaensis - Schizachyrium lomaense

== See also ==
- List of Poaceae genera
