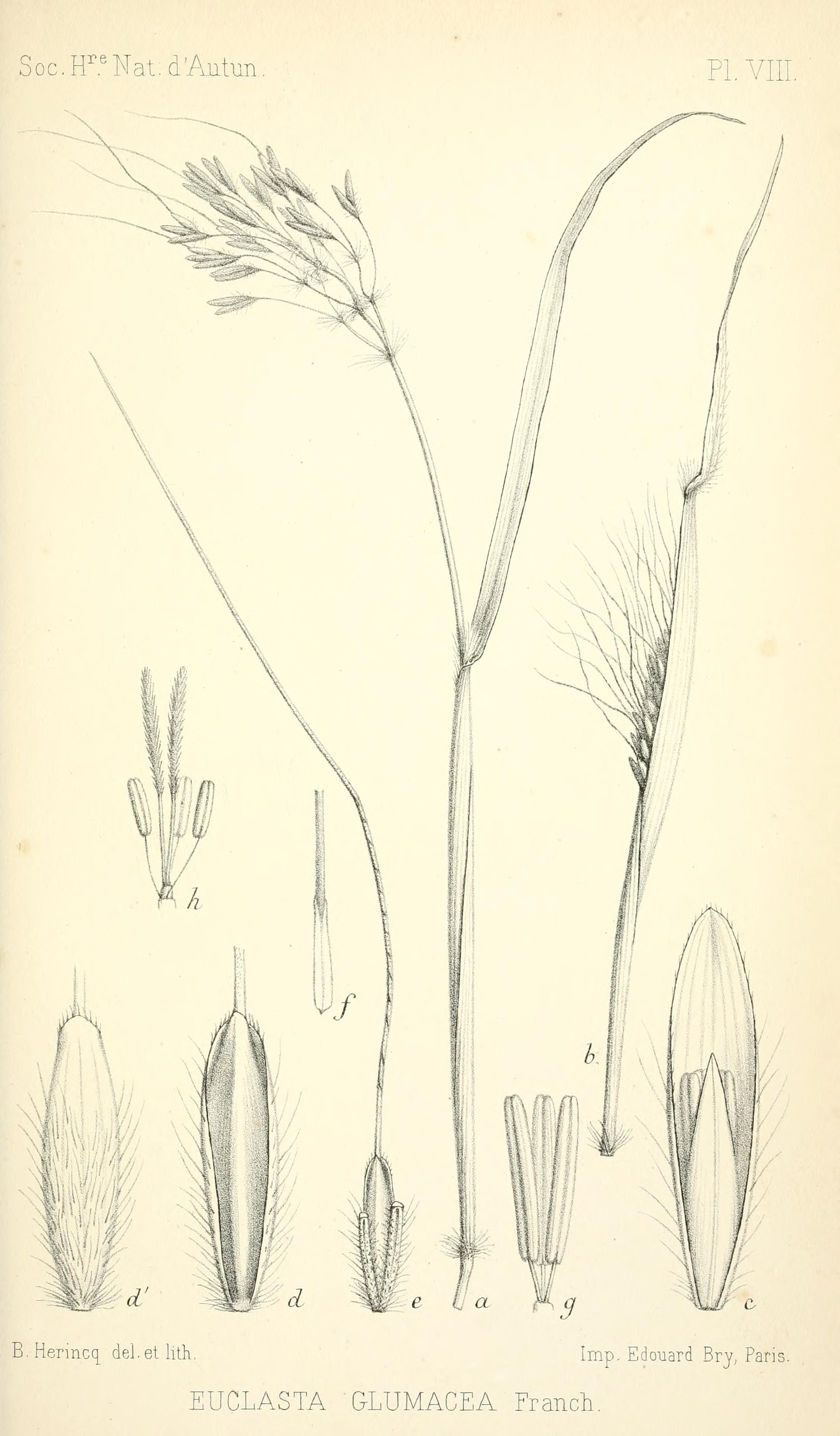
- Euclasta condylotricha

Scientific classification
- Kingdom: Plantae
- Clade: Tracheophytes
- Clade: Angiosperms
- Clade: Monocots
- Clade: Commelinids
- Order: Poales
- Family: Poaceae
- Subfamily: Panicoideae
- Supertribe: Andropogonodae
- Tribe: Andropogoneae
- Subtribe: Saccharinae
- Genus: Euclasta; Franch.

Type species
- Euclasta glumacea (syn of E. condylotricha) Franch.

Synonyms
- Indochloa Bor

= Euclasta (plant) =

Genus of grasses

Euclasta is a genus of Asian, African, and Neotropical plants in the grass family.

== Species ==
Species include:

- Euclasta clarkei (Hack.) Cope — native to Oman, India, Myanmar;
- Euclasta condylotricha (Hochst. ex Steud.) Stapf — native to Africa (from Senegal to Zimbabwe, and in Madagascar and Comoros); South Asia in India; North America, Central America, and South America (from Sinaloa in northwest México to Goiás in Brazil).
