= Thyrsia (plant) =

Scientific classification
- Kingdom: Plantae
- Clade: Tracheophytes
- Clade: Angiosperms
- Clade: Monocots
- Clade: Commelinids
- Order: Poales
- Family: Poaceae
- Subfamily: Panicoideae
- Supertribe: Andropogonodae
- Tribe: Andropogoneae
- Subtribe: Ratzeburgiinae
- Genus: Thyrsia; Stapf

Genus of grasses

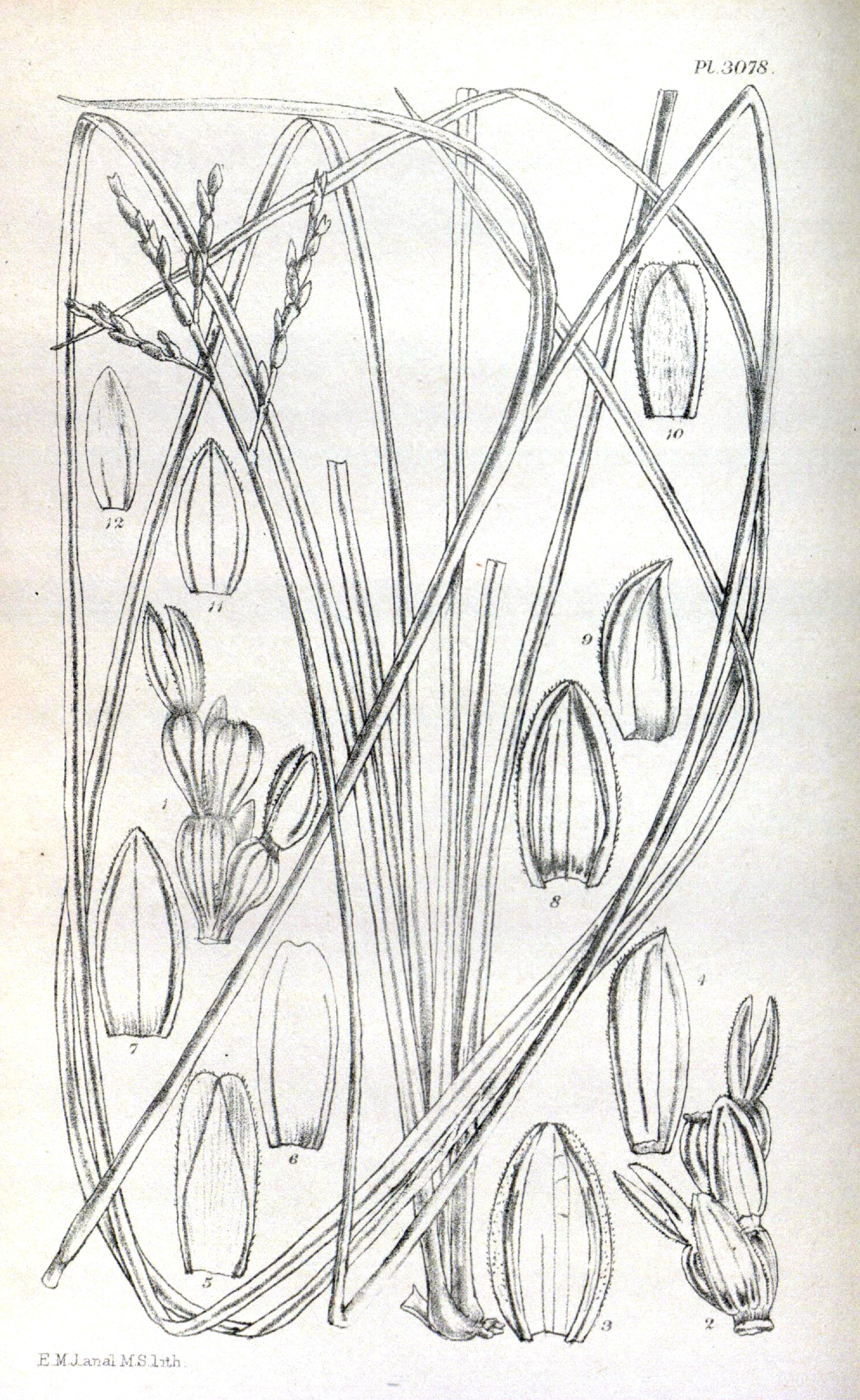
Thyrsia inflata Stapf = Thyrsia huillensis (Rendle) Stapf

Thyrsia is a genus of grasses. It includes three species native to east-central and southern tropical Africa and the Indian subcontinent, Indochina, and southern China.

- Thyrsia huillensis (Rendle) Stapf
- Thyrsia schliebenii Pilg.
- Thyrsia zea (C.B.Clarke) Stapf
