= Trilobachne =

Scientific classification
- Kingdom: Plantae
- Clade: Tracheophytes
- Clade: Angiosperms
- Clade: Monocots
- Clade: Commelinids
- Order: Poales
- Family: Poaceae
- Subfamily: Panicoideae
- Supertribe: Andropogonodae
- Tribe: Andropogoneae
- Subtribe: Chionachninae
- Genus: Trilobachne; Schenck ex Henrard
- Species: T. cookei

Binomial name
- Trilobachne cookei (Stapf) Schenck ex Henrard

Synonyms
- Polytoca cookei Stapf

Genus of grasses

Trilobachne is a genus of South Asian plants in the grass family.

Species

The only known species is Trilobachne cookei, native to Myanmar and to India (Gujarat, Karnataka, Maharashtra, Kerala).
