= Thelepogon =

Scientific classification
- Kingdom: Plantae
- Clade: Tracheophytes
- Clade: Angiosperms
- Clade: Monocots
- Clade: Commelinids
- Order: Poales
- Family: Poaceae
- Subfamily: Panicoideae
- Supertribe: Andropogonodae
- Tribe: Andropogoneae
- Genus: Thelepogon; Roth

Type species
- Thelepogon elegans Roth

Genus of grasses

Thelepogon is a genus of Asian, African, and Australian plants in the grass family.

Species

- Thelepogon australiensis B.K.Simon - Queensland
- Thelepogon elegans Roth - Asia (India, Myanmar, Thailand, Java, Bali), Africa (from Guinea to Tanzania to Namibia)

formerly included

see Schizachyrium

- Thelepogon sanguineus - Schizachyrium sanguineum
