= Pogonachne =

Scientific classification
- Kingdom: Plantae
- Clade: Tracheophytes
- Clade: Angiosperms
- Clade: Monocots
- Clade: Commelinids
- Order: Poales
- Family: Poaceae
- Subfamily: Panicoideae
- Supertribe: Andropogonodae
- Tribe: Andropogoneae
- Subtribe: Ischaeminae
- Genus: Pogonachne; Bor
- Species: P. racemosa

Binomial name
- Pogonachne racemosa Bor

Synonyms
- Sehima racemosum (Bor) Roberty

Genus of grasses

Pogonachne is a genus of Indian plants in the grass family. The only known species is Pogonachne racemosa, native to Maharashtra.
