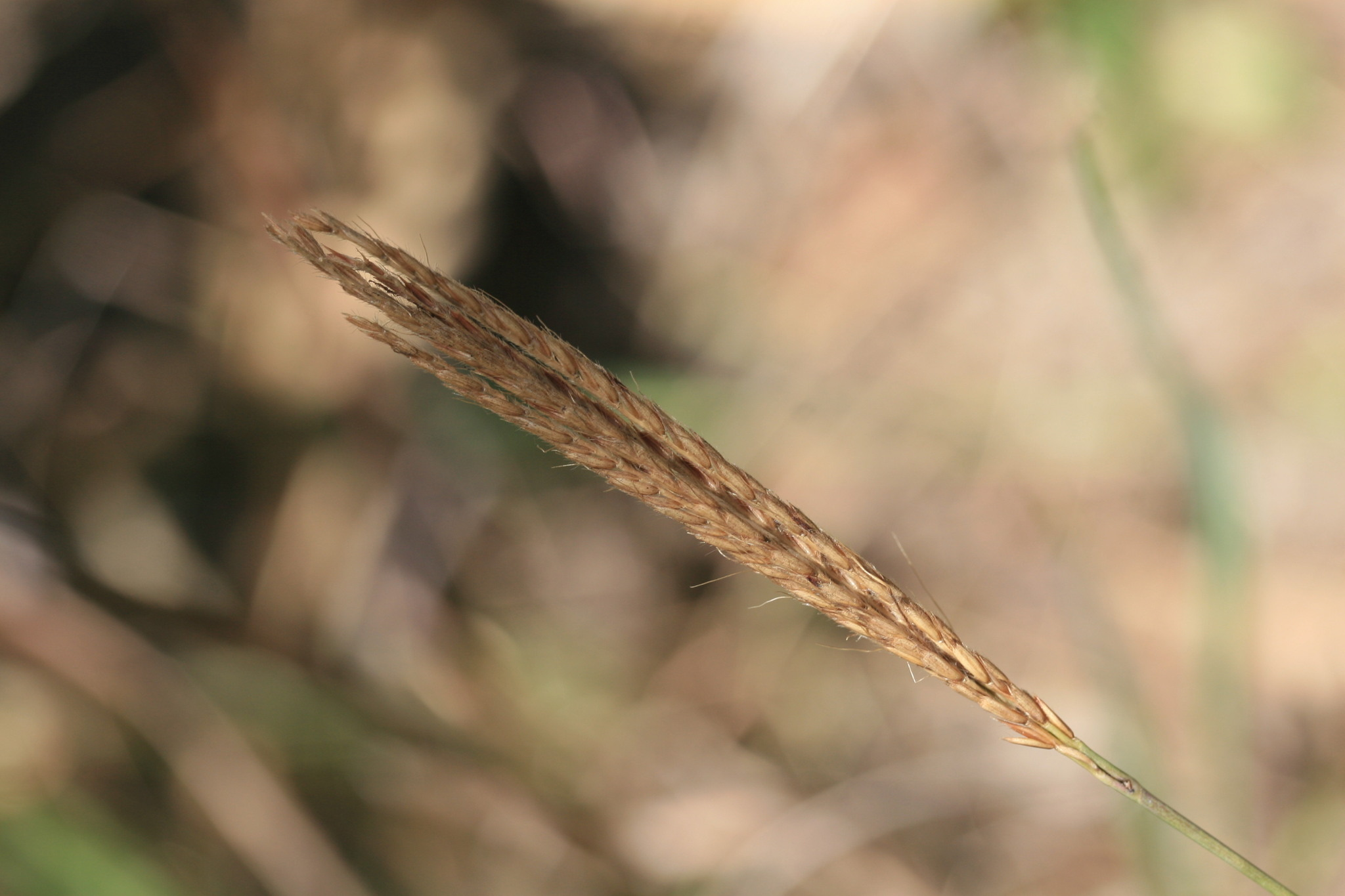
- Germainia truncatiglumis

Scientific classification
- Kingdom: Plantae
- Clade: Embryophytes
- Clade: Tracheophytes
- Clade: Angiosperms
- Clade: Monocots
- Clade: Commelinids
- Order: Poales
- Family: Poaceae
- Subfamily: Panicoideae
- Supertribe: Andropogonodae
- Tribe: Andropogoneae
- Subtribe: Germainiinae
- Genus: Germainia; Balansa & Poitr.

Type species
- Germainia capitata Balansa & Poitr.

Synonyms
- Balansochloa Kuntze; Chumsriella Bor; Sclerandrium Stapf & C.E.Hubb.

= Germainia =

Genus of plants

Germainia is a genus of plants in the grass family. Species of the genus are found in China, Asia and Australia.

== Species ==
The following species are recognised in the genus Germainia:

- Germainia capitata Balansa & Poitr. – Guangdong, Yunnan, Vietnam, Thailand, New Guinea, Queensland
- Germainia grandiflora (S.T.Blake) Chai-Anan – Queensland, Northern Territory
- Germainia khasyana Hack. – Assam, Myanmar, Thailand
- Germainia lanipes Hook.f. – Myanmar, Thailand
- Germainia pilosa Chai-Anan – Thailand
- Germainia tenax (Balansa) Chai-Anan – Cambodia, Laos, Thailand, Vietnam
- Germainia thailandica (Bor) Chai-Anan – Thailand
- Germainia thorelii A.Camus – Laos, Thailand, Vietnam
- Germainia truncatiglumis (F.Muell. ex Benth.) Chai-Anan – Northern Territory, Western Australia, New Guinea
