= List of Panicum species =

As of July 2025, Plants of the World Online recognises 251 accepted taxa (of species and infraspecific names) in the plant genus Panicum.

== A ==
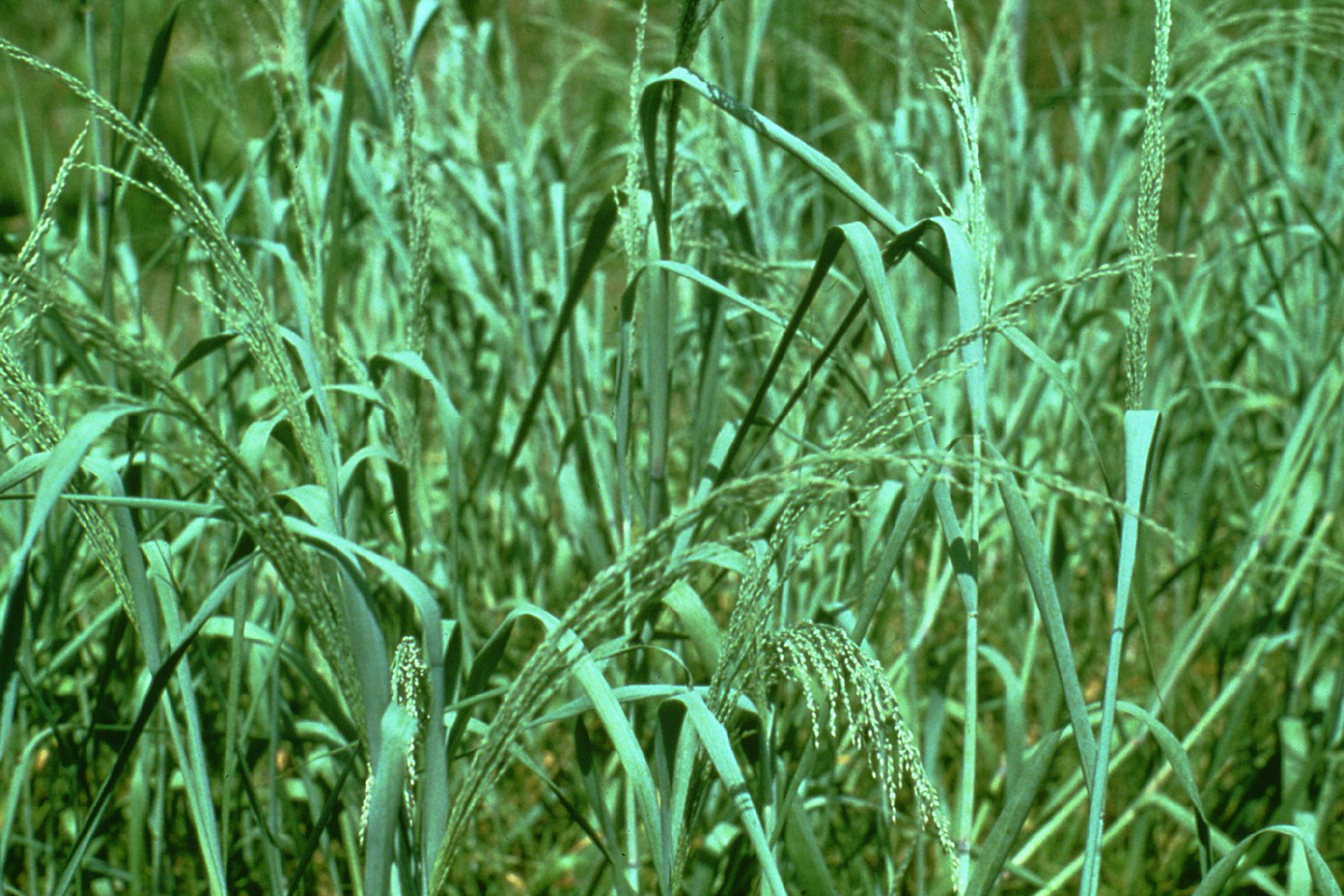
Panicum amarum

- Panicum afzelii Sw.
- Panicum alatum Zuloaga & Morrone
- Panicum aldabrense Renvoize
- Panicum altum Hitchc. & Chase
- Panicum amarum Elliott – bitter panicum
- Panicum ambositrense A.Camus
- Panicum amoenum Balansa
- Panicum anabaptistum Steud.
- Panicum andringitrense A.Camus
- Panicum ankarense A.Camus
- Panicum aquarum Zuloaga & Morrone
- Panicum aquaticum Poir.
- Panicum arbusculum Mez
- Panicum arcurameum Stapf
- Panicum aristispiculum (B.K.Simon) Zuloaga
- Panicum assumptionis Stapf
- Panicum atrosanguineum Hochst. ex A.Rich.
- Panicum australiense Domin
- Panicum aztecanum Zuloaga & Morrone

== B ==
- Panicum bambusiusculum Stapf
- Panicum bartlettii Swallen
- Panicum bechuanense Bremek. & Oberm.
- Panicum beecheyi Hook. & Arn.
- Panicum bergii Arechav.
- Panicum bisulcatum Thunb.
- Panicum boivinianum (Steud.) T.Durand & Schinz
- Panicum bombycinum B.K.Simon
- Panicum brassianum (B.K.Simon) Zuloaga
- Panicum brevifolium L.
- Panicum buncei F.Muell. ex Benth.

== C ==
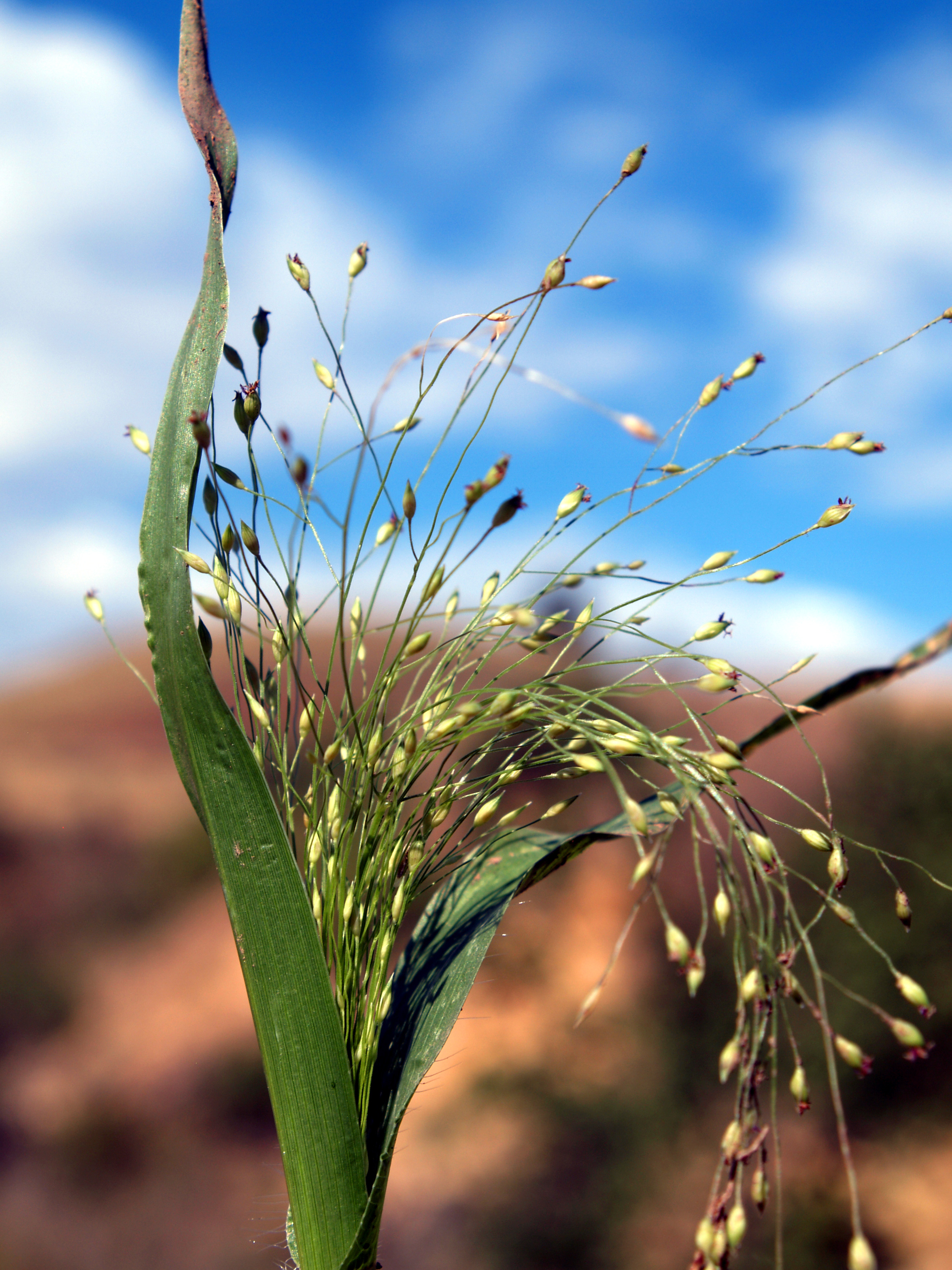
Panicum capillare

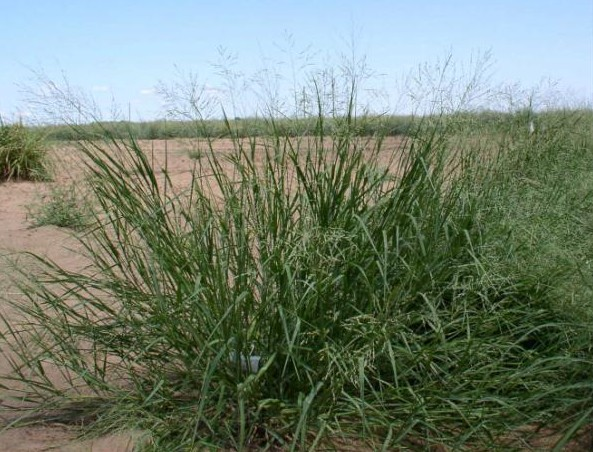
Panicum coloratum

- Panicum × calliphyllum Ashe
- Panicum callosum Hochst. ex A.Rich.
- Panicum calocarpum Berhaut
- Panicum calvum Stapf
- Panicum campestre Nees ex Trin.
- Panicum capillare L. – witchgrass, tumbleweed
- Panicum capillarioides Vasey
- Panicum capuronii A.Camus
- Panicum carneovaginatum Renvoize
- Panicum catasusii D.Morejón
- Panicum caudiglume Hack.
- Panicum cayennense Lam.
- Panicum cervicatum Chase
- Panicum chambeshii Renvoize
- Panicum chaseae Roseng., B.R.Arrill. & Izag.
- Panicum chillagoanum B.K.Simon
- Panicum chloroleucum Griseb.
- Panicum cinctum Hack.
- Panicum clarksonianum (B.K.Simon) Zuloaga
- Panicum coloratum L. – kleingrass, coolah grass, Bambatsi panic
- Panicum complanatum Guglieri, Longhi-Wagner & Zuloaga
- Panicum congoense Franch.
- Panicum cristatellum Keng
- Panicum crystallinum Judz. & Voronts.
- Panicum cupressifolium A.Camus
- Panicum curviflorum Hornem.

== D ==
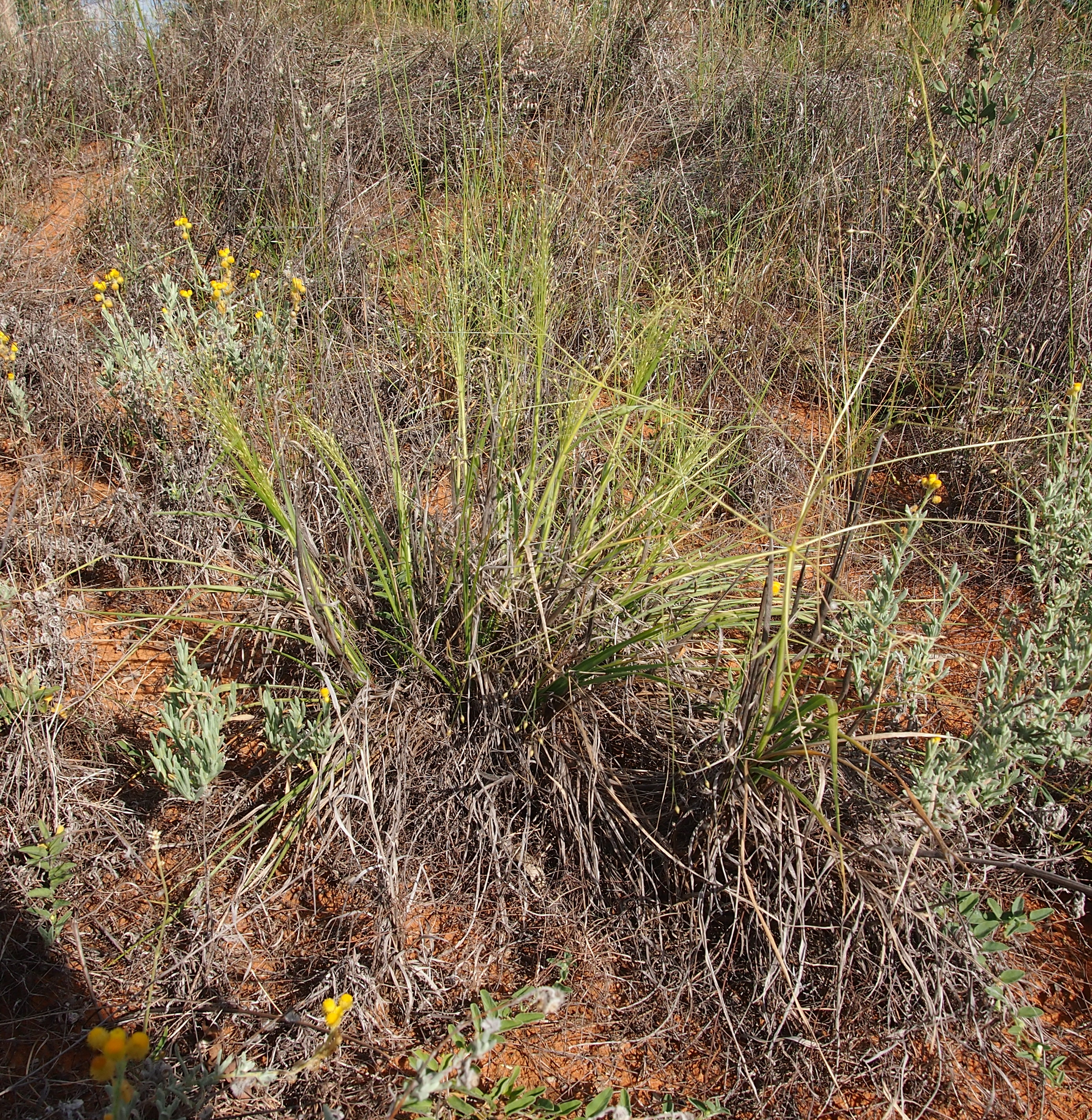
Panicum decompositum

- Panicum danguyi A.Camus
- Panicum deciduum Swallen
- Panicum decolorans Kunth
- Panicum decompositum R.Br. – Australian millet
- Panicum deschampsioides Domin
- Panicum dewinteri J.G.Anderson
- Panicum dichotomiflorum Michx. – fall panicgrass
- Panicum diffusum Sw.
- Panicum dolichoadenotrichum A.Camus
- Panicum dorsense S.M.Phillips
- Panicum dregeanum Nees

== E ==
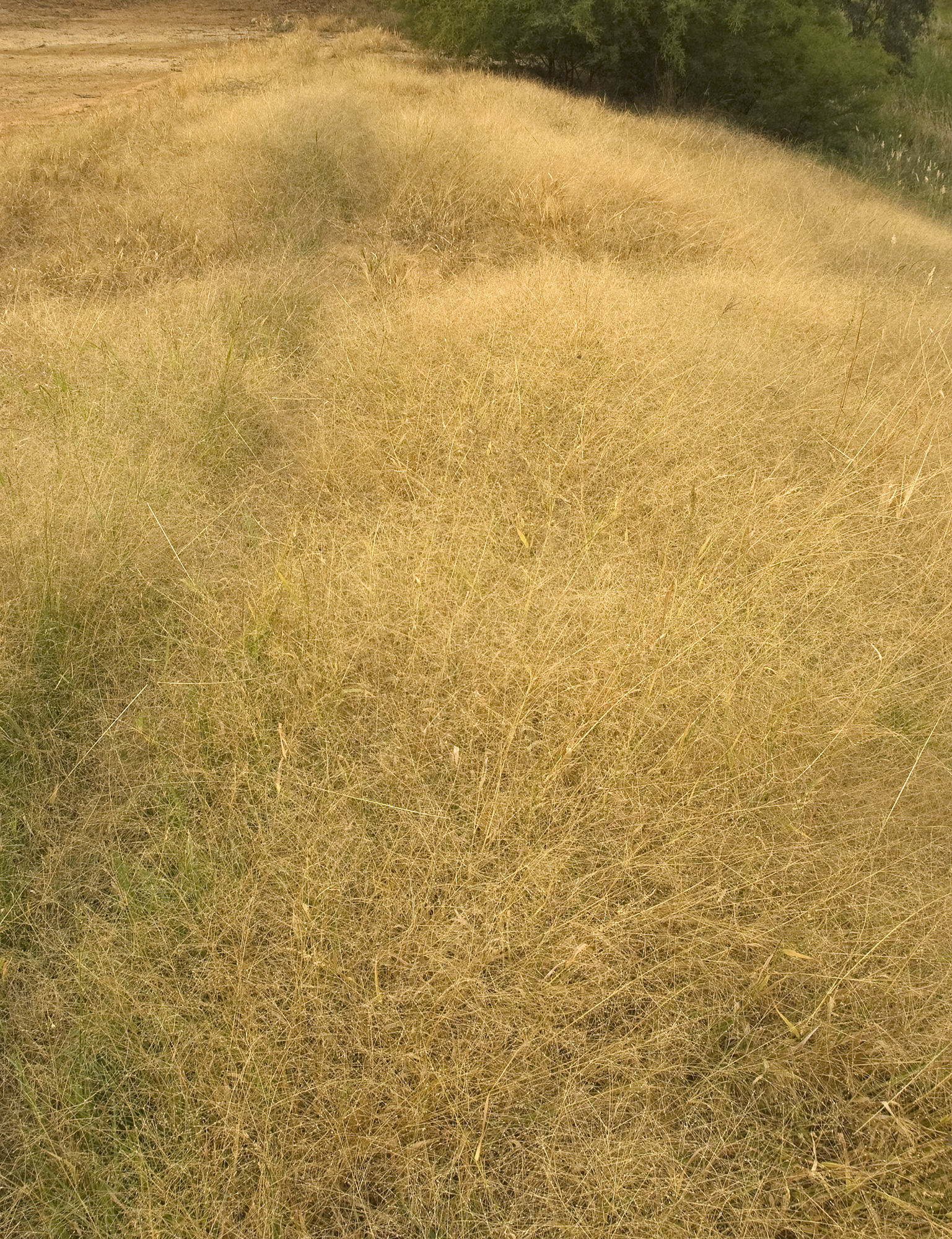
Panicum effusum

- Panicum effusum R.Br. – hairy panic
- Panicum elegantissimum Hook.f.
- Panicum ephemeroides Zuloaga & Morrone
- Panicum ephemerum Renvoize
- Panicum exiguum Mez

== F ==
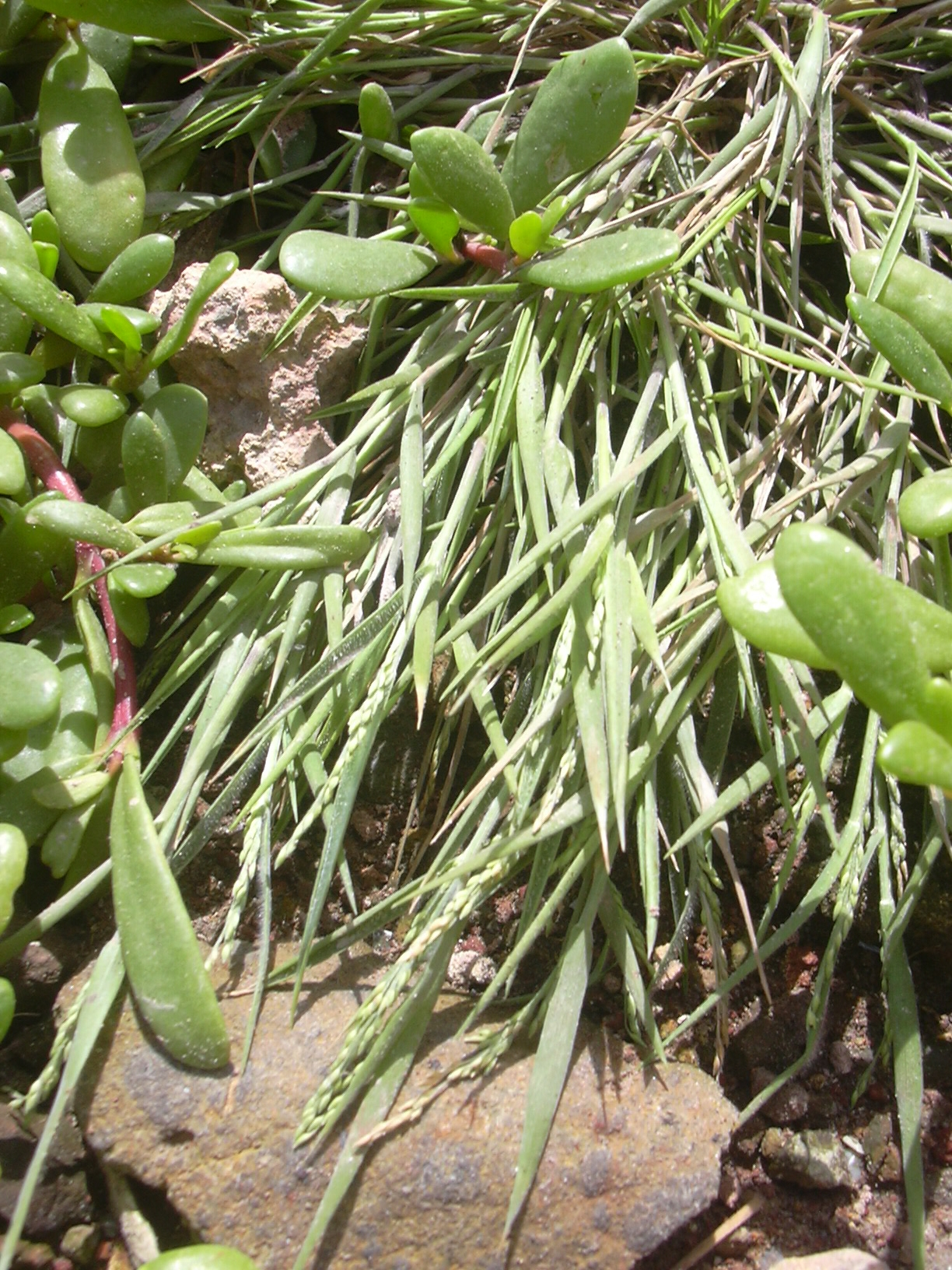
Panicum fauriei

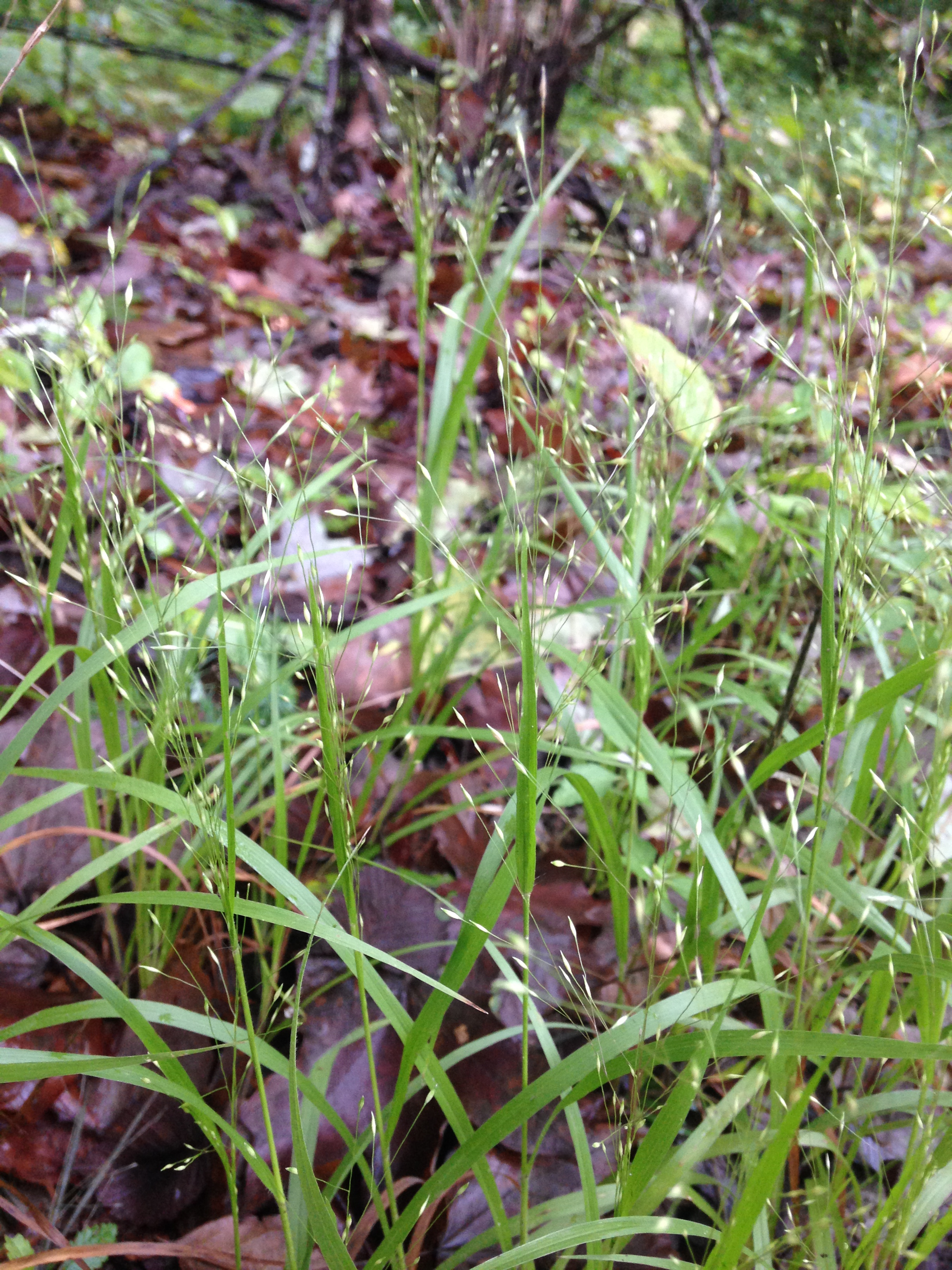
Panicum flexile

- Panicum fasciculiforme Mez
- Panicum fauriei Hitchc. – Faurie's panicgrass
- Panicum fischeri Bor
- Panicum flacourtii A.Camus
- Panicum flexile (Gatt.) Scribn. – wiry panicgrass
- Panicum fluviicola Steud.
- Panicum foliolosum (Munro ex Hook.f.) Stieber
- Panicum fontanale Swallen
- Panicum furvum Swallen

== G ==
- Panicum gardneri Thwaites
- Panicum gattingeri Nash
- Panicum genuflexum Stapf
- Panicum ghiesbreghtii E.Fourn.
- Panicum gilvum Launert
- Panicum glabripes Döll
- Panicum glandulopaniculatum Renvoize
- Panicum gouinii E.Fourn.
- Panicum graciliflorum Rendle
- Panicum graniflorum Stapf
- Panicum griffonii Franch.
- Panicum gymnocarpon Elliott

== H ==
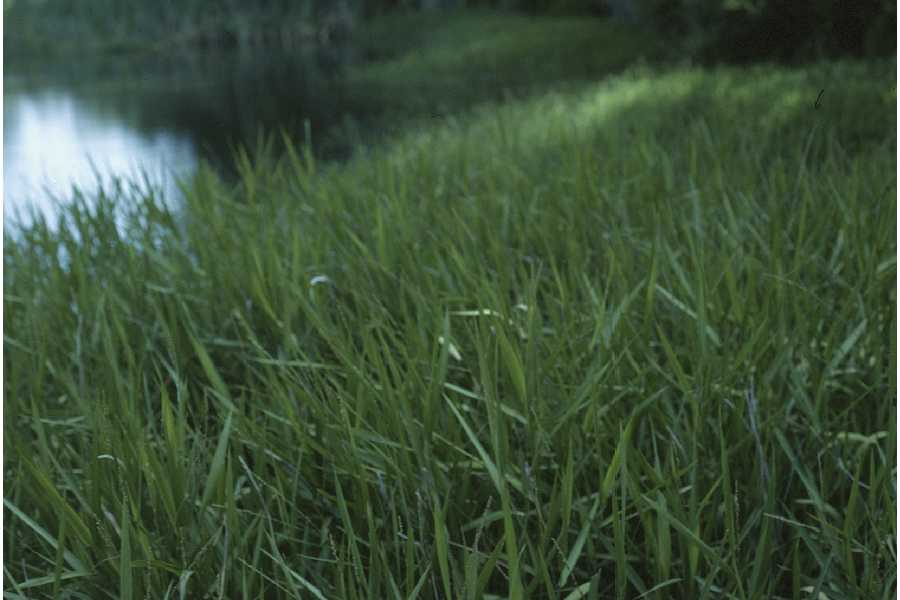
Panicum hemitomon

- Panicum haenkeanum J.Presl
- Panicum hallii Vasey
- Panicum hanningtonii Stapf
- Panicum haplocaulos Pilg.
- Panicum havardii Vasey – Havard's panicgrass
- Panicum hayatae A.Camus
- Panicum hemitomon Schult. – maidencane
- Panicum hillmanii Chase – Hillmann's panicgrass
- Panicum hippothrix K.Schum. ex Engl.
- Panicum hirsutum Sw.
- Panicum hirticaule J.Presl – Mexican panicgrass
- Panicum hirtum Lam.
- Panicum hispidifolium Swallen
- Panicum hochstetteri Steud.
- Panicum homblei Robyns
- Panicum humbertii A.Camus
- Panicum humidorum Buch.-Ham. ex Hook.f.
- Panicum humile Steud.
- Panicum hygrocharis Steud.

== I ==
- Panicum ibitense A.Camus
- Panicum impeditum Launert
- Panicum incisum Munro ex C.B.Clarke
- Panicum incomtum Trin.
- Panicum inconspicuum Voronts.
- Panicum issongense Pilg.

== J ==
- Panicum johnii S.M.Almeida
- Panicum joshuae Lambdon

== K ==
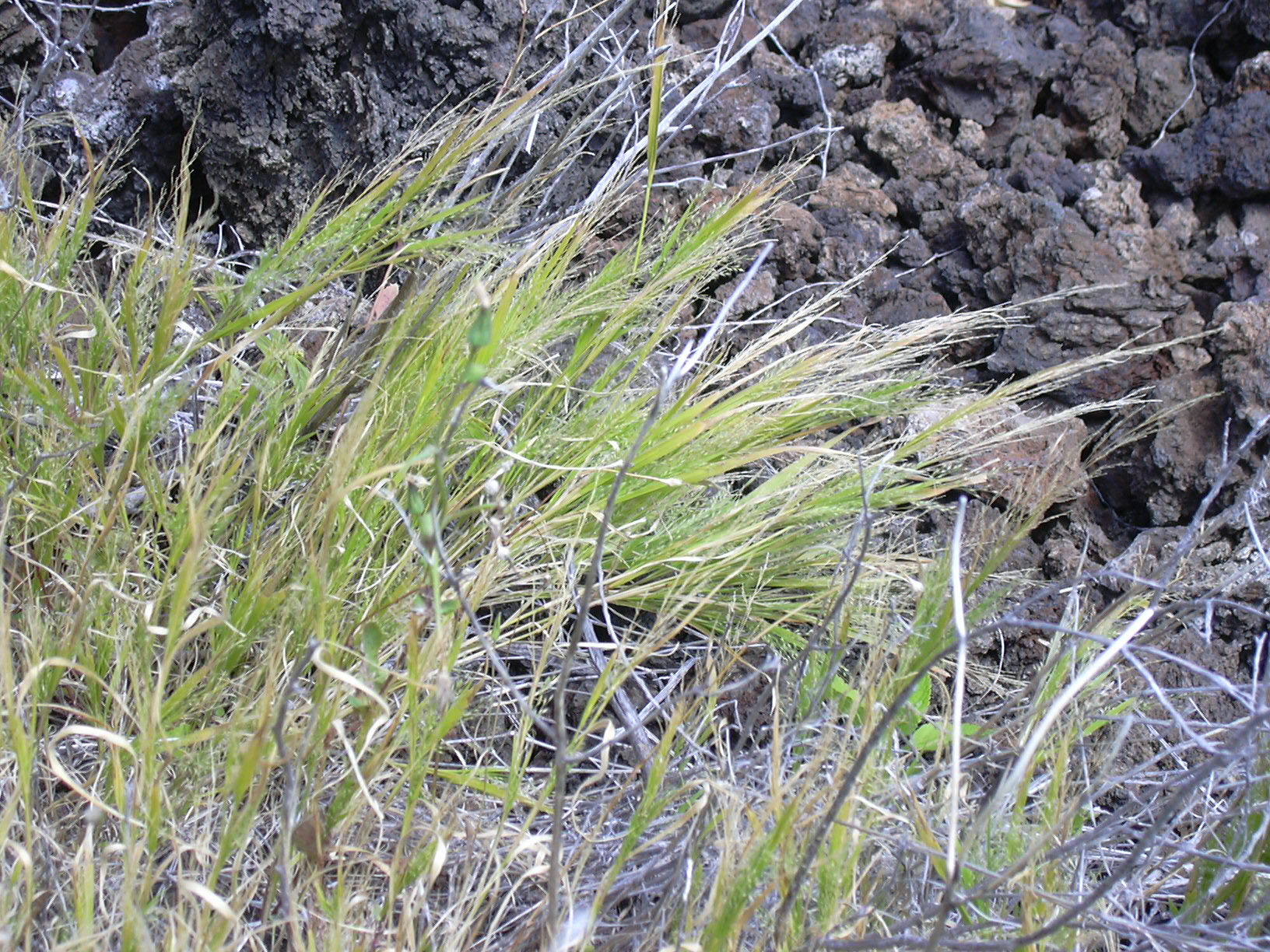
Panicum konaense

- Panicum kalaharense Mez
- Panicum kasumense Renvoize
- Panicum khasianum Munro ex Hook.f.
- Panicum konaense Whitney & Hosaka

== L ==
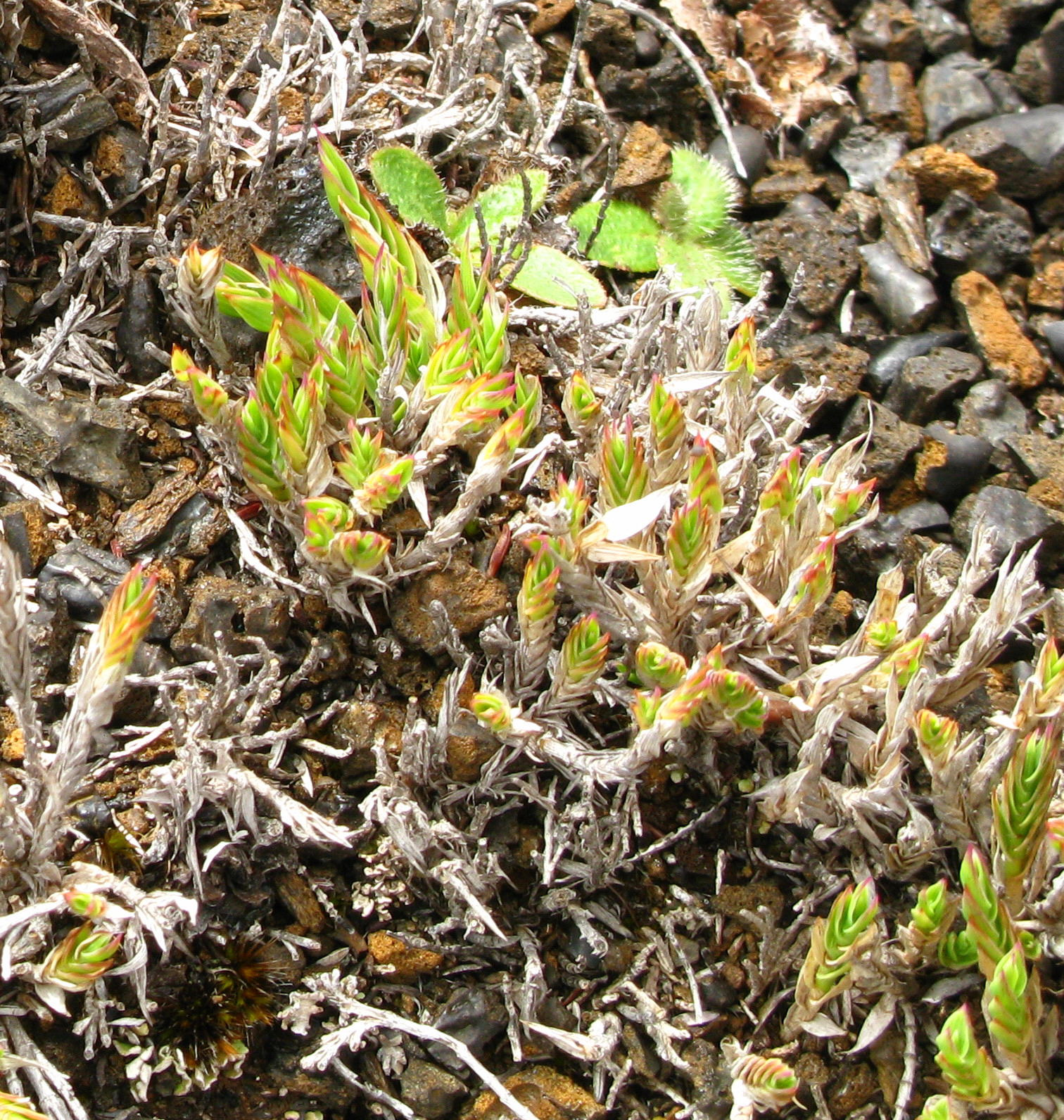
Panicum lycopodioides

- Panicum lacustre Hitchc. & Ekman
- Panicum laetum Kunth
- Panicum laevinode Lindl.
- Panicum lanipes Mez
- Panicum larcomianum Hughes
- Panicum laticomum Nees
- Panicum latzii R.D.Webster
- Panicum lepidulum Hitchc. & Chase
- Panicum leprosulum Mez
- Panicum ligulare Nees ex Trin.
- Panicum lineale H.St.John
- Panicum linoidem Steud.
- Panicum longiloreum M.M.Rahman
- Panicum longissimum (Mez) Henrard
- Panicum longivaginatum H.St.John
- Panicum luridum Hack.
- Panicum luzonense J.Presl
- Panicum lycopodioides Bory ex Nees

== M ==
- Panicum madipirense Mez
- Panicum magnispicula Zuloaga, Morrone & Valls
- Panicum majusculum F.Muell. ex Benth.
- Panicum malacotrichum Steud.
- Panicum manongarivense A.Camus
- Panicum mapalense Pilg.
- Panicum massaiense Stapf
- Panicum merkeri Mez
- Panicum miliaceum L. – proso millet, common millet
- Panicum millegrana Poir.
- Panicum mindanaense Merr.
- Panicum mitchellii Benth.
- Panicum mitopus K.Schum.
- Panicum mlahiense Renvoize
- Panicum mohavense Reeder
- Panicum monticola Hook.f.
- Panicum mucronulatum Mez
- Panicum muelleri (Hughes)
- Panicum mystasipum Zuloaga & Morrone

== N ==
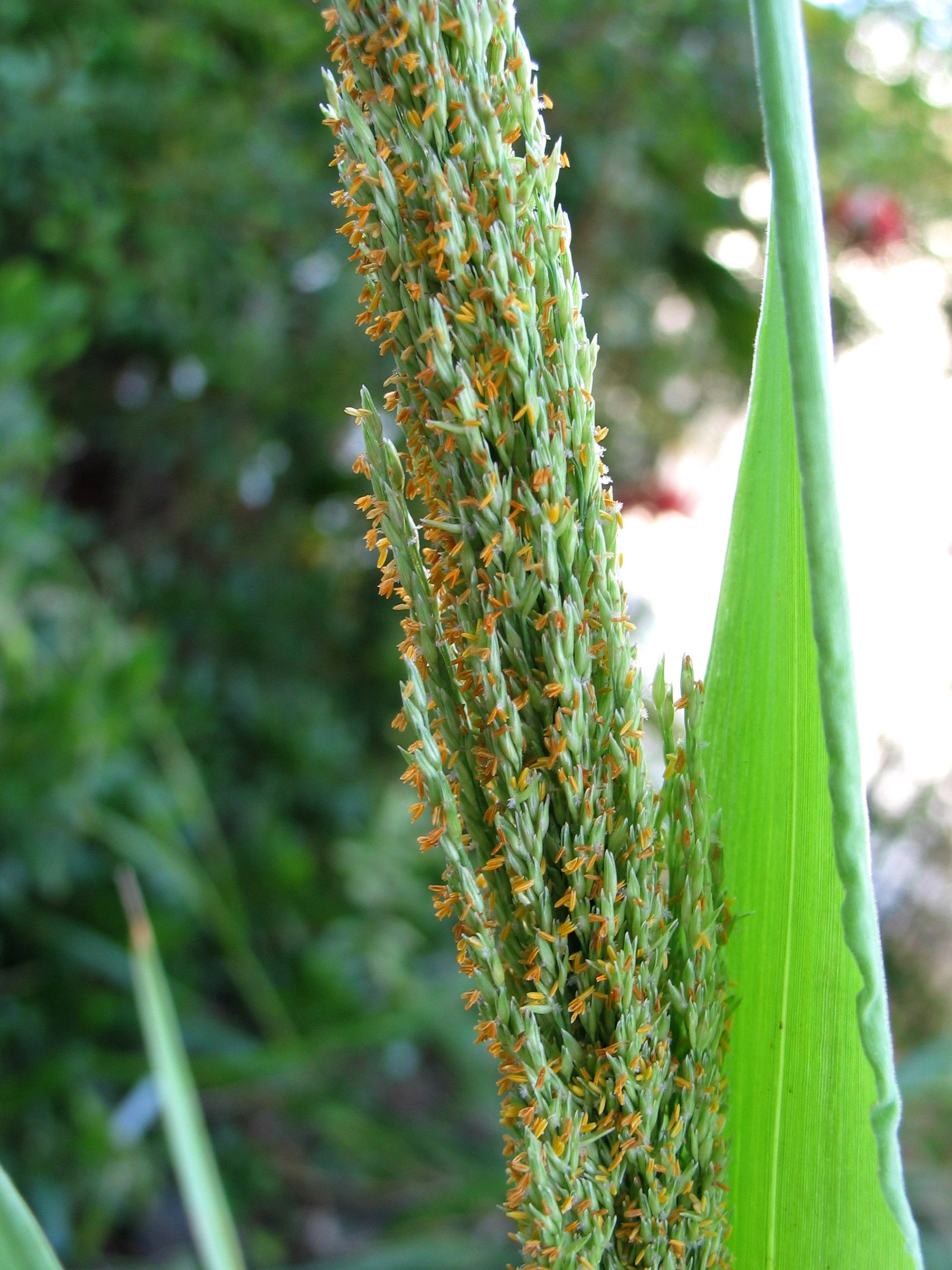
Panicum niihauense

- Panicum neobathiei A.Camus
- Panicum nephelophilum Gaudich.
- Panicum nigerense Hitchc.
- Panicum niihauense H.St.John – lau 'ehu
- Panicum notatum Retz.
- Panicum novemnerve Stapf
- Panicum nudiflorum Renvoize
- Panicum nullum (Lazarides & R.D.Webster) Zuloaga
- Panicum nymphoides Renvoize

== O ==
- Panicum obseptum Trin.
- Panicum oligoadenotrichum A.Camus
- Panicum olyroides Kunth

== P ==
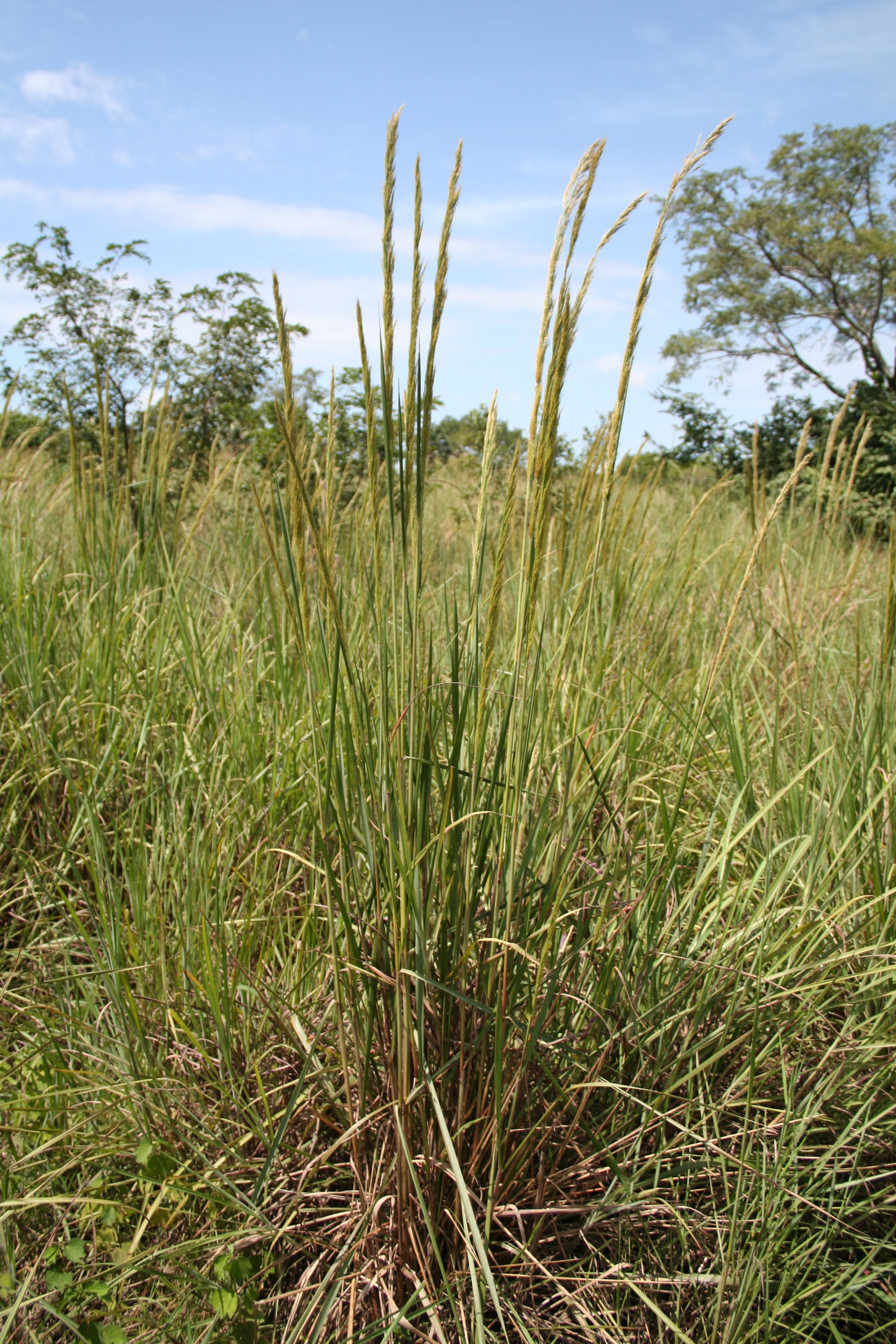
Panicum phragmitoides

- Panicum paianum Naik & Patunkar
- Panicum palackyanum A.Camus
- Panicum palauense Ohwi
- Panicum pampinosum Hitchc. & Chase
- Panicum pansum Rendle
- Panicum parapaurochaetium A.Camus
- Panicum parcum Hitchc. & Chase
- Panicum pauciflorum R.Br.
- Panicum paucinode Stapf
- Panicum pearsonii F.Bolus
- Panicum pedersenii Zuloaga
- Panicum peladoense Henrard
- Panicum pellitum Trin.
- Panicum perangustatum Renvoize
- Panicum philadelphicum Bernh. ex Nees
- Panicum phippsii Renvoize
- Panicum phoiniclados Naik & Patunkar
- Panicum phragmitoides Stapf
- Panicum pilgeri Mez
- Panicum pilgerianum (Schweick.) Clayton
- Panicum pinifolium Chiov.
- Panicum piptopilum Steud.
- Panicum pleianthum Peter
- Panicum pooides Stapf
- Panicum porphyrrhizos Steud.
- Panicum pseudoracemosum Renvoize

== Q ==
- Panicum quadriglume (Döll) Hitchc.
- Panicum queenslandicum Domin

== R ==
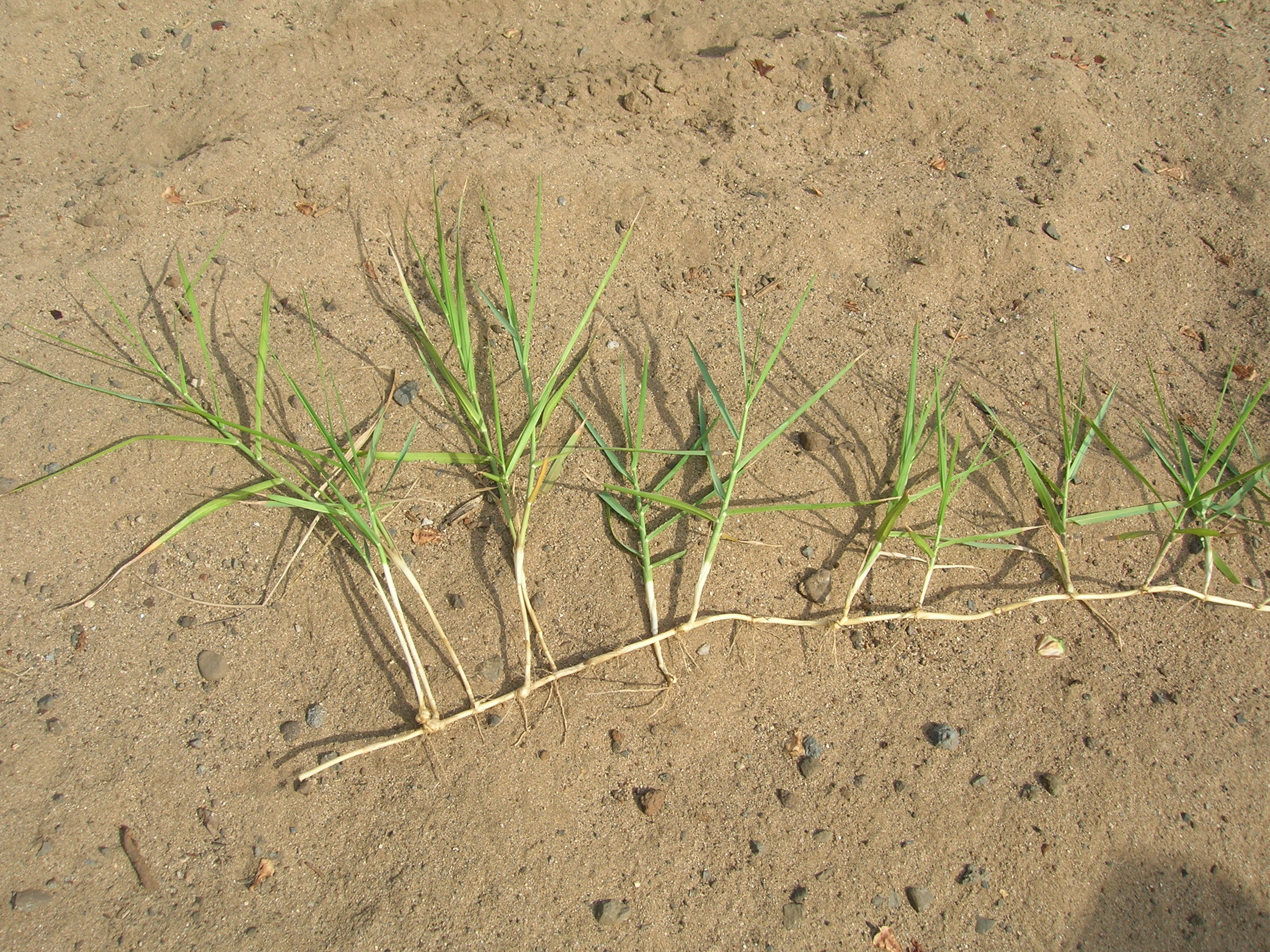
Panicum repens

- Panicum racemosum (P.Beauv.) Spreng.
- Panicum ramosius Hitchc.
- Panicum repens L. – torpedo grass
- Panicum rigidum Balf.f.
- Panicum robynsii A.Camus
- Panicum rudgei Roem. & Schult.
- Panicum rupestre Trin.
- Panicum ruspolii Chiov.

== S ==
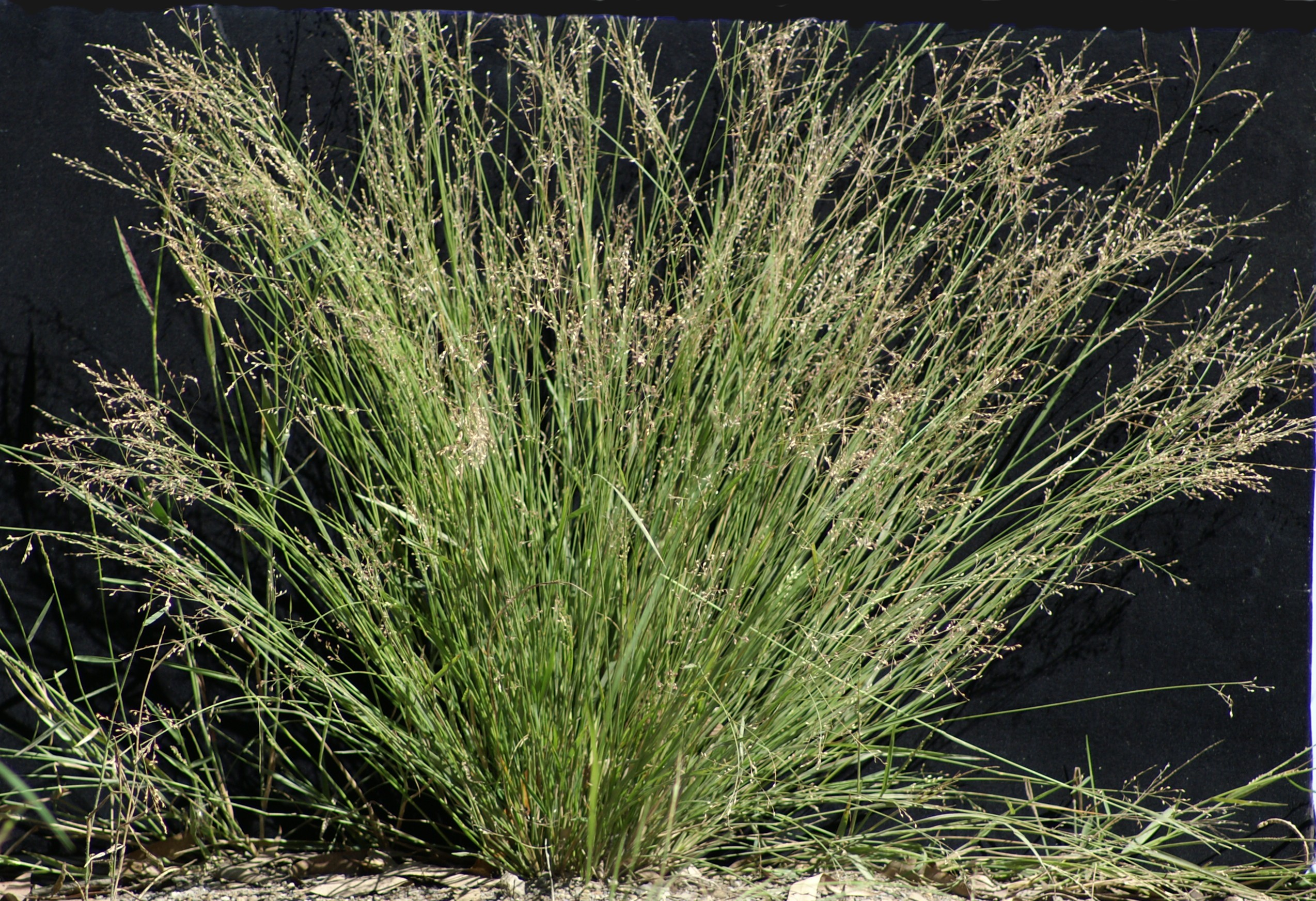
Panicum simile

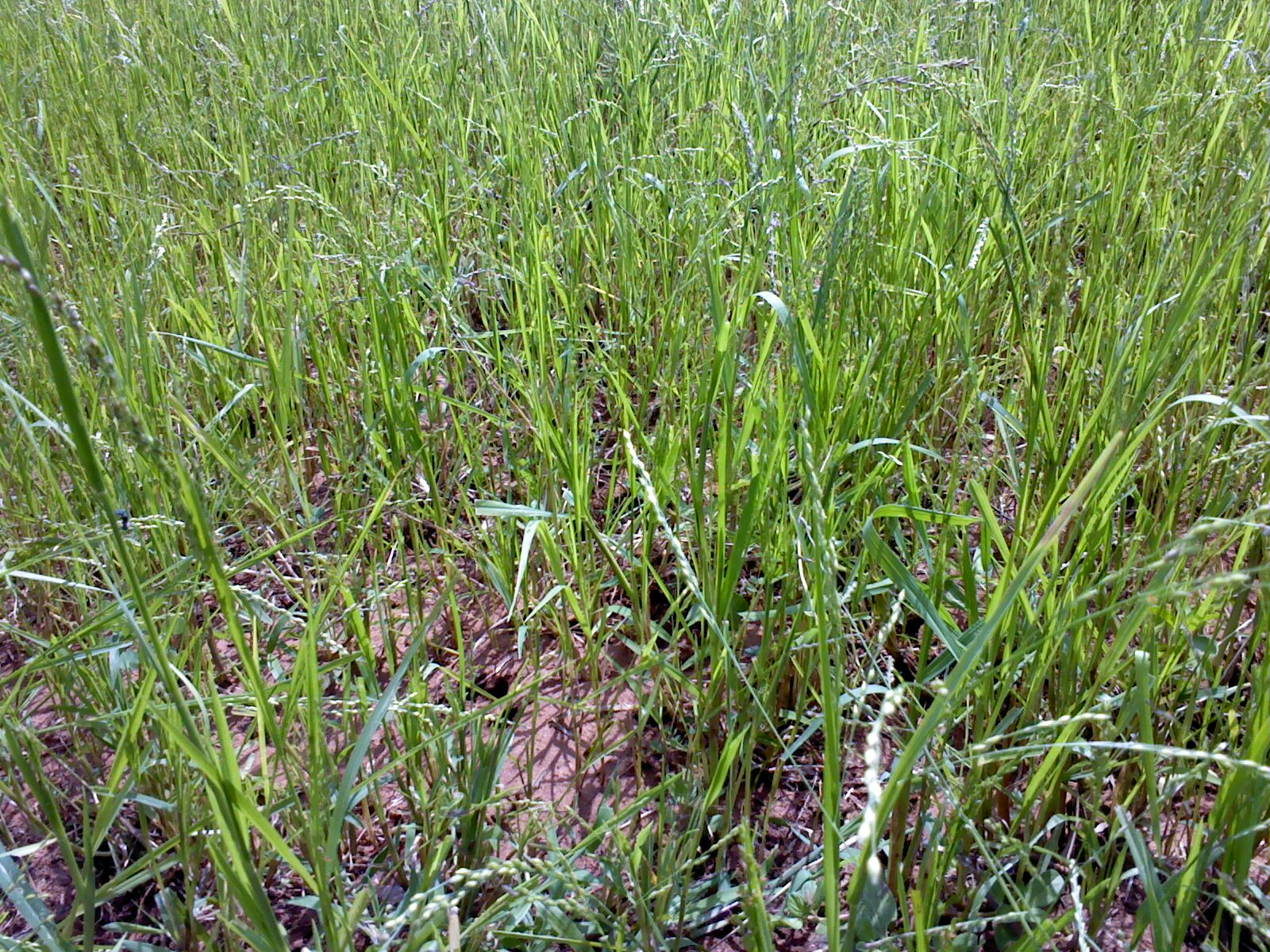
Panicum sumatrense

- Panicum sancta-luciense Fish
- Panicum sarmentosum Roxb.
- Panicum schinzii Hack.
- Panicum sellowii Nees
- Panicum seminudum Domin
- Panicum shinyangense Renvoize
- Panicum silvestre Fish
- Panicum simile Domin – two colour panic
- Panicum simulans Smook
- Panicum smithii M.M.Rahman
- Panicum socotranum Cope
- Panicum sparsicomum Nees ex Steud.
- Panicum spergulifolium A.Camus
- Panicum spongiosum Stapf
- Panicum stapfianum Fourc.
- Panicum stevensianum Hitchc. & Chase
- Panicum stramineum Hitchc. & Chase
- Panicum subalbidum Kunth
- Panicum subflabellatum Stapf
- Panicum subhystrix A.Camus
- Panicum sublaetum Stapf
- Panicum sublaeve Swallen
- Panicum subtilissimum Renvoize
- Panicum sumatrense Roth – little millet

== T ==
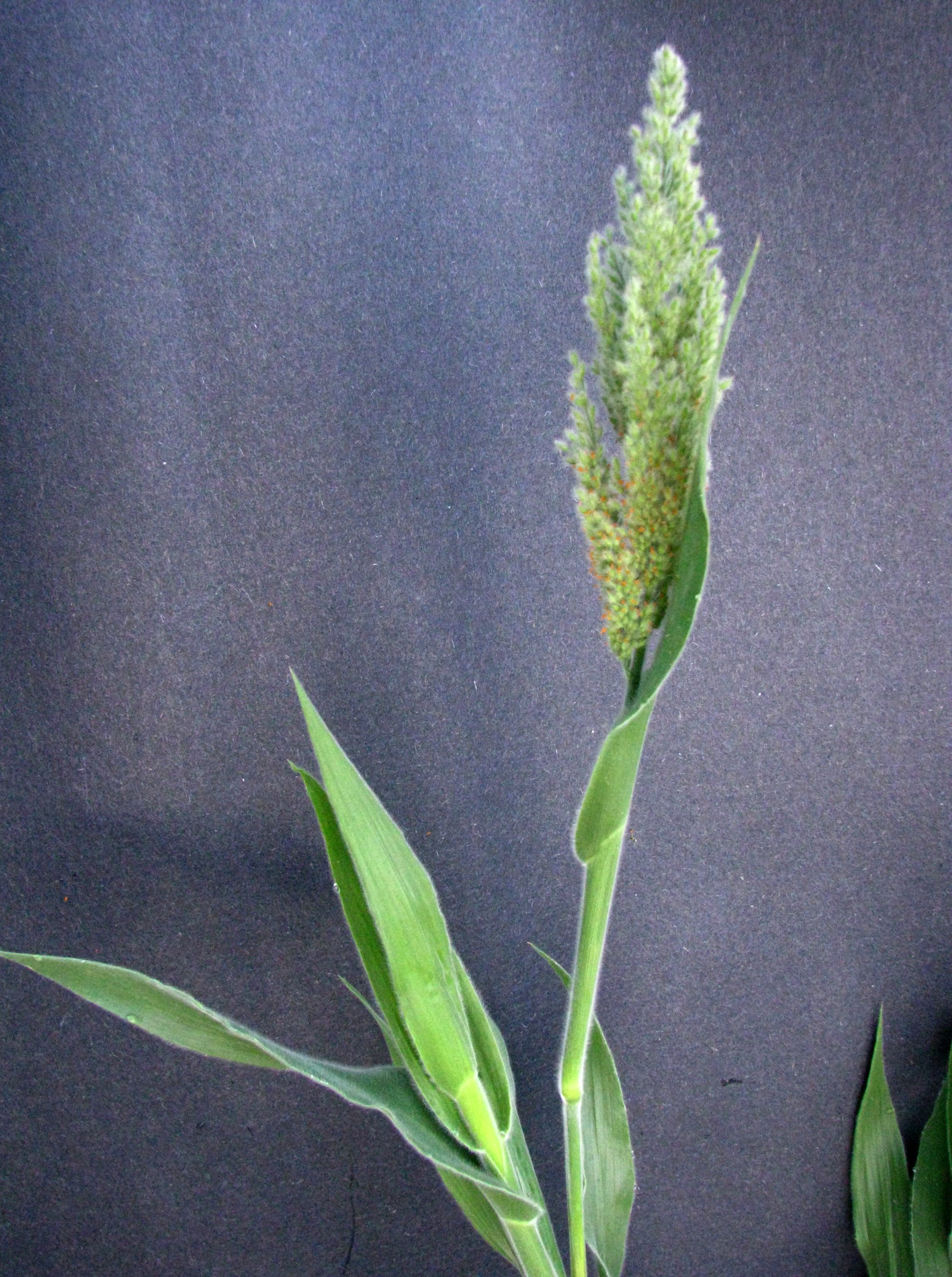
Panicum torridum

- Panicum taiwanense S.S.Ying
- Panicum tamaulipense F.R.Waller & Morden
- Panicum tenuifolium Hook. & Arn.
- Panicum torridum Gaudich.
- Panicum trachyrhachis Benth.
- Panicum trichanthum Nees
- Panicum trichoides Sw.
- Panicum tricholaenoides Steud.
- Panicum trichonode Launert & Renvoize
- Panicum turgidum Forssk. – afezu

== U ==
- Panicum urvilleanum Kunth

== V ==
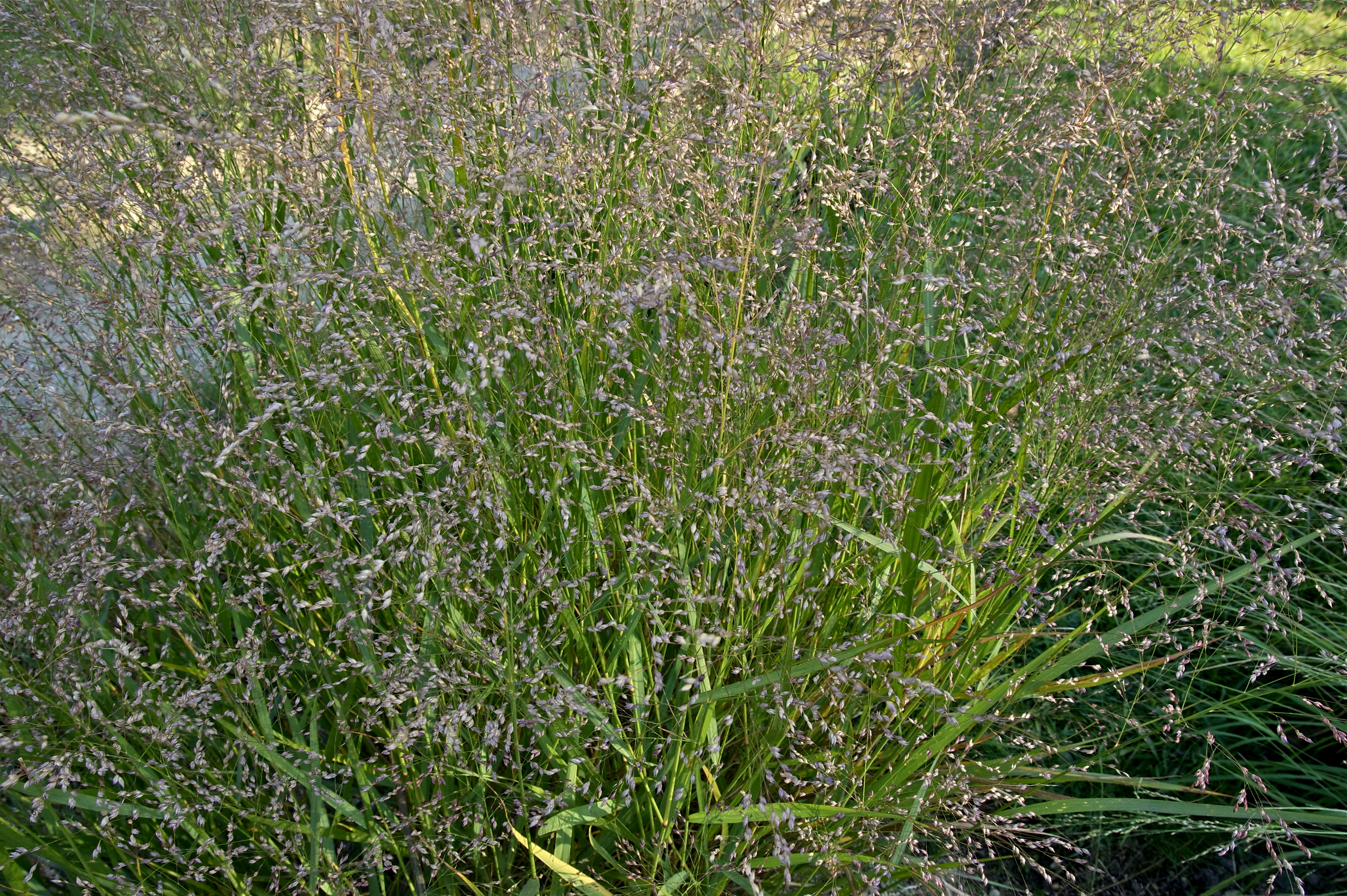
Panicum virgatum

- Panicum vaseyanum Scribn. ex Beal
- Panicum vatovae Chiov.
- Panicum venosum Swallen
- Panicum virgatum L. – switchgrass
- Panicum voeltzkowii Mez
- Panicum vohitrense A.Camus
- Panicum volutans J.G.Anderson

== W ==
- Panicum websteri (B.K.Simon) Zuloaga

== X ==
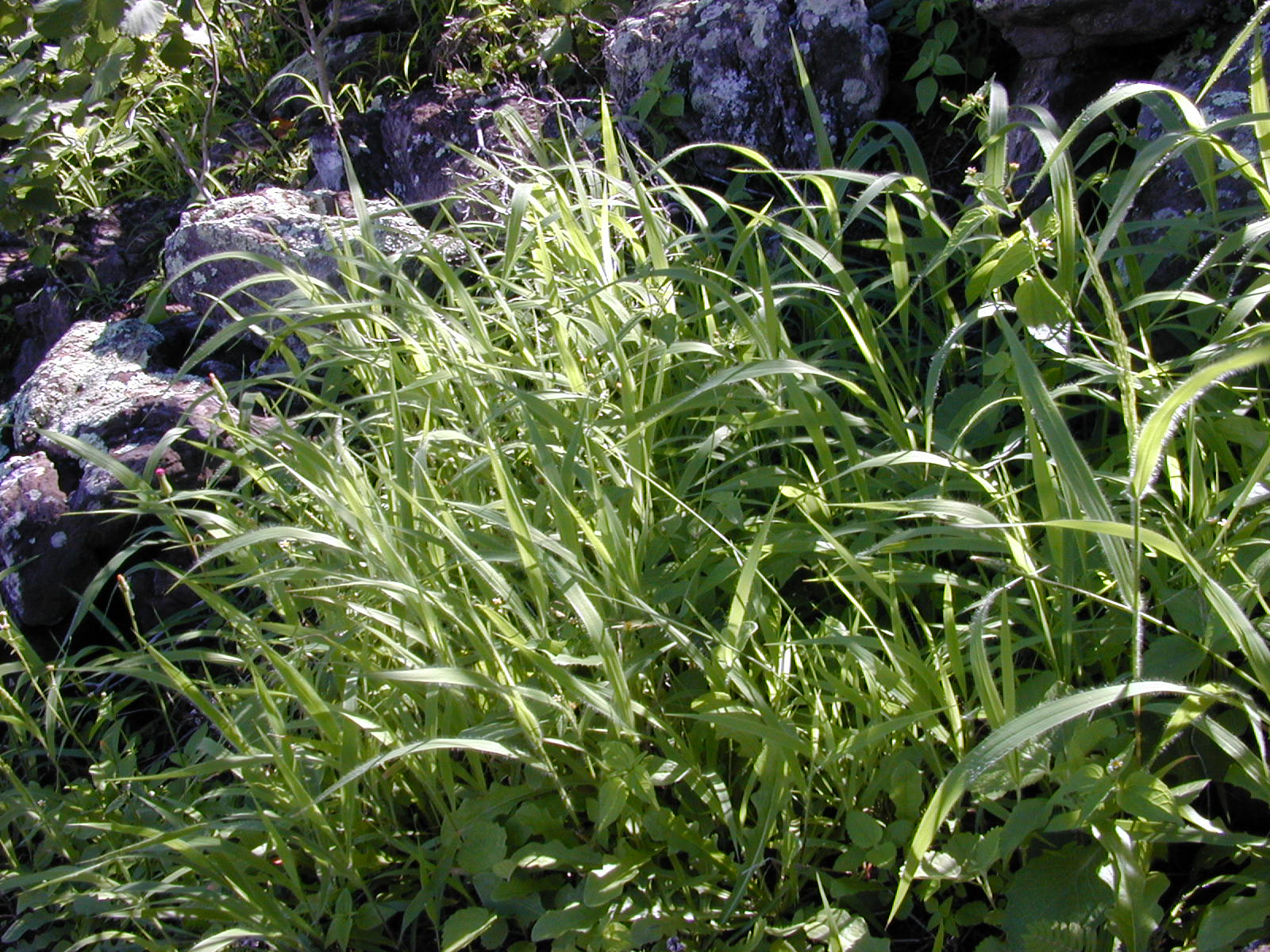
Panicum xerophilum

- Panicum xerophilum (Hillebr.) Hitchc.

== Z ==
- Panicum zambesiense Renvoize

== Synonyms ==
- Panicum tuerckheimii Hack. = Aakia tuerckheimii (Hack.) J.R. Grande, 2014
- Panicum venezuelae Hack. = Drakkaria venezuelae (Hack.) C.Silva & Zuloaga
