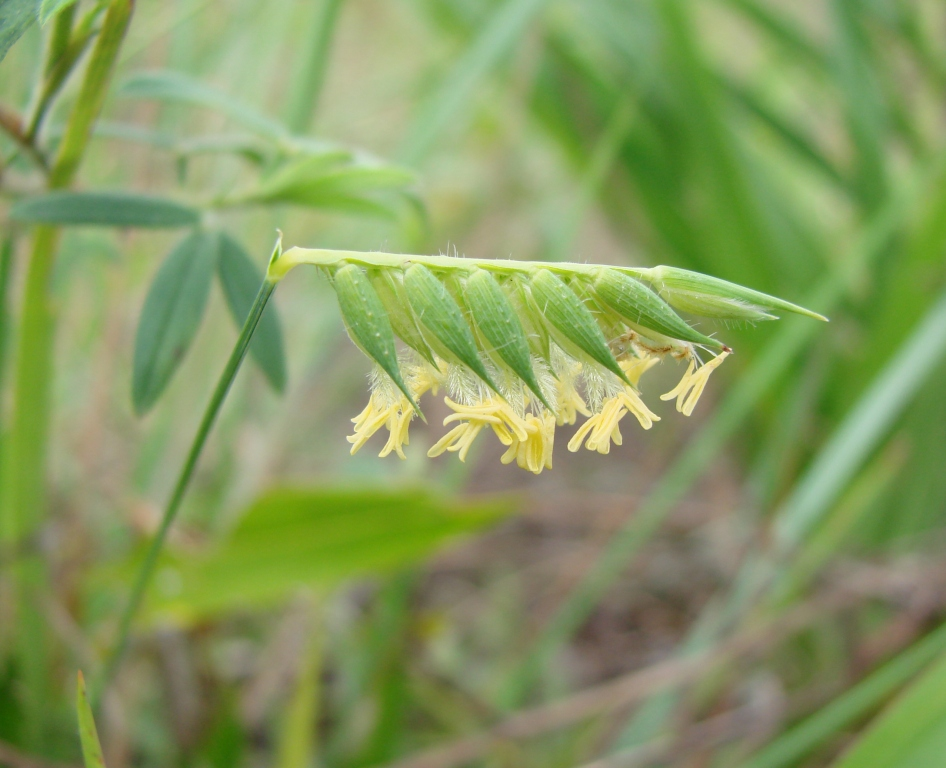
- Echinolaena inflexa

Scientific classification
- Kingdom: Plantae
- Clade: Tracheophytes
- Clade: Angiosperms
- Clade: Monocots
- Clade: Commelinids
- Order: Poales
- Family: Poaceae
- Subfamily: Panicoideae
- Supertribe: Andropogonodae
- Tribe: Paspaleae
- Subtribe: Paspalinae
- Genus: Echinolaena; Desv.

Type species
- Echinolaena hirta (syn. of E. inflexa) Desv.

Synonyms
- Panicum sect. Echinolaena (Desv.) Nees; Echinochlaena Spreng.

= Echinolaena =

Genus of grasses

Echinolaena is a genus of plants in tribe Paspaleae of the grass family, native to the New World tropics. It includes only two species after the referral of former members to the related genera Ichnanthus, Oedochloa and the more distant Chasechloa (tribe Paniceae) in a 2015 revision.

Species

- Echinolaena gracilis - from Yucatán to Bolivia
- Echinolaena inflexa - Guyana, Suriname, French Guiana, Venezuela, Colombia, Bolivia, Mato Grosso, Mato Grosso do Sul, Minas Gerais, Bahia, Goiás, D.F., São Paulo, Maranhão

formerly included

- E. boiviniana - Chasechloa egregia
- E. brachystachya - Panicum brachystachyum
- E. ecuadoriana - Oedochloa ecuadoriana
- E. loliacea - Ichnanthus hirtus
- E. madagascariensis - Chasechloa madagascariensis
- E. minarum - Oedochloa minarum
- E. navicularis - Ichnanthus glaber
- E. nemorosa - Ichnanthus nemorosus
- E. oplismenoides - Ichnanthus oplismenoides
- E. polystachya - Pseudechinolaena polystachya
- E. procurrens - Ichnanthus procurrens
- E. standelyi - Oedochloa standelyi
- E. trinii - Pseudechinolaena polystachya
