= Achlaena =

Achlaena may refer to:

- Achlaena grandis, a species in the monotypic genus of mantises, Achlaena, in the family Mantidae
- Achlaena (plant), a synonyms for the genus of plants Arthropogon, in the family Poaceae
