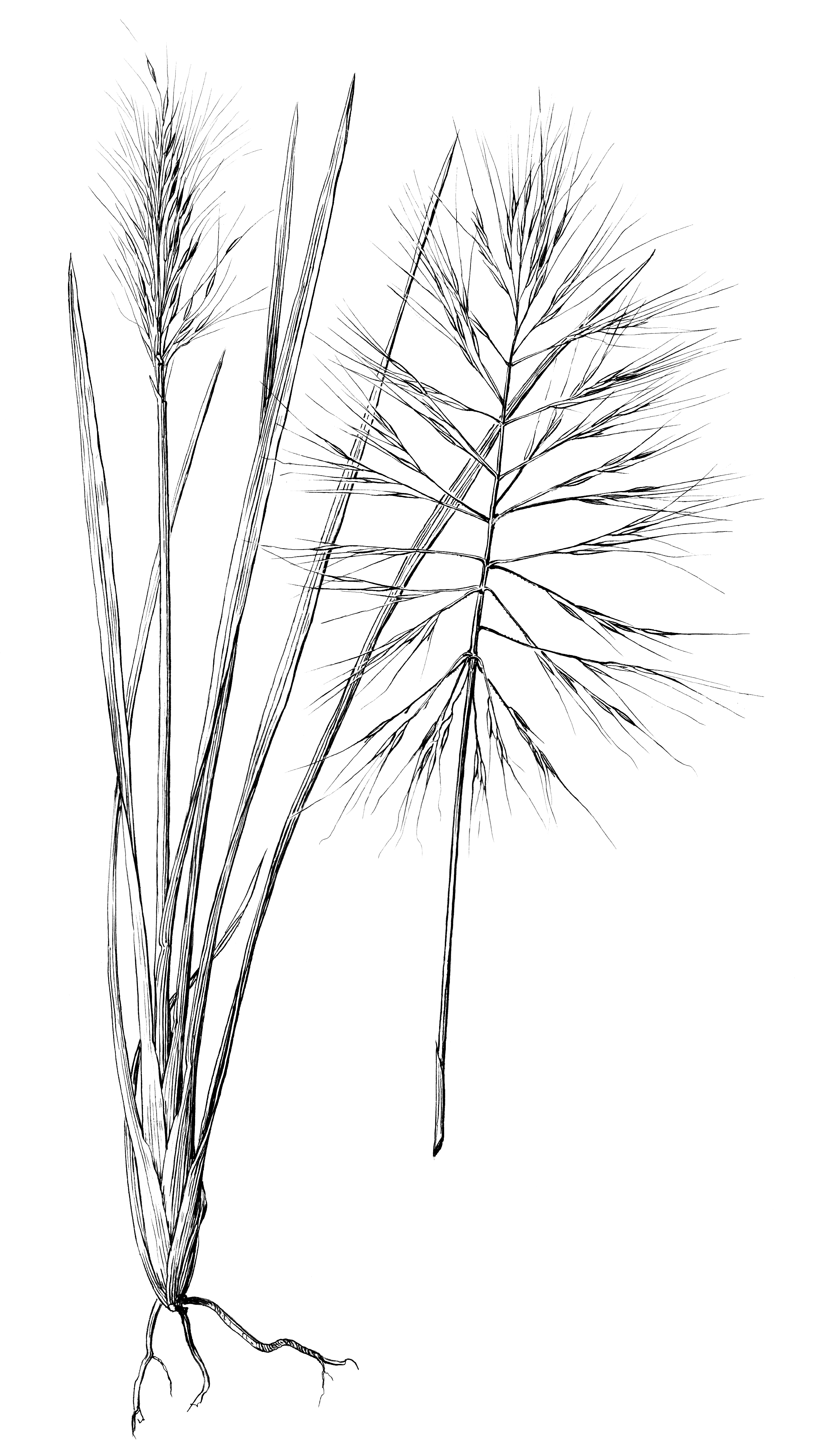
- Arthropogon piptostachyus

Scientific classification
- Kingdom: Plantae
- Clade: Tracheophytes
- Clade: Angiosperms
- Clade: Monocots
- Clade: Commelinids
- Order: Poales
- Family: Poaceae
- Subfamily: Panicoideae
- Supertribe: Andropogonodae
- Tribe: Paspaleae
- Subtribe: Arthropogoninae
- Genus: Arthropogon; Nees

Type species
- Arthropogon villosus Nees

Synonyms
- Achlaena Griseb.

= Arthropogon =

Genus of grasses

Arthropogon is a genus of South American and Caribbean bunchgrass plants in the grass family.

== Species ==
Species include:

- Arthropogon filifolius Filg. — endemic to Brazil, in Goiás and Minas Gerais states, and the Distrito Federal.
- Arthropogon piptostachyus (Griseb.) Pilg. — Cuba, Jamaica.
- Arthropogon sorengii Gir.-Cañas — endemic to Colombia, in Vaupés Department.
- Arthropogon villosus Nees — Brazil, Bolivia.
- Arthropogon xerachne Ekman — endemic to Brazil, in São Paulo and Paraná states.

=== Formerly included ===
Some species formerly in Arthropogon are reclassified in the genera Altoparadisium or Canastra, and include:

- Arthropogon bolivianus — Altoparadisium scabrum
- Arthropogon lanceolatus — Canastra lanceolata
- Arthropogon rupestris — Altoparadisium scabrum
- Arthropogon scaber — Altoparadisium scabrum

== See also ==
- List of Poaceae genera
