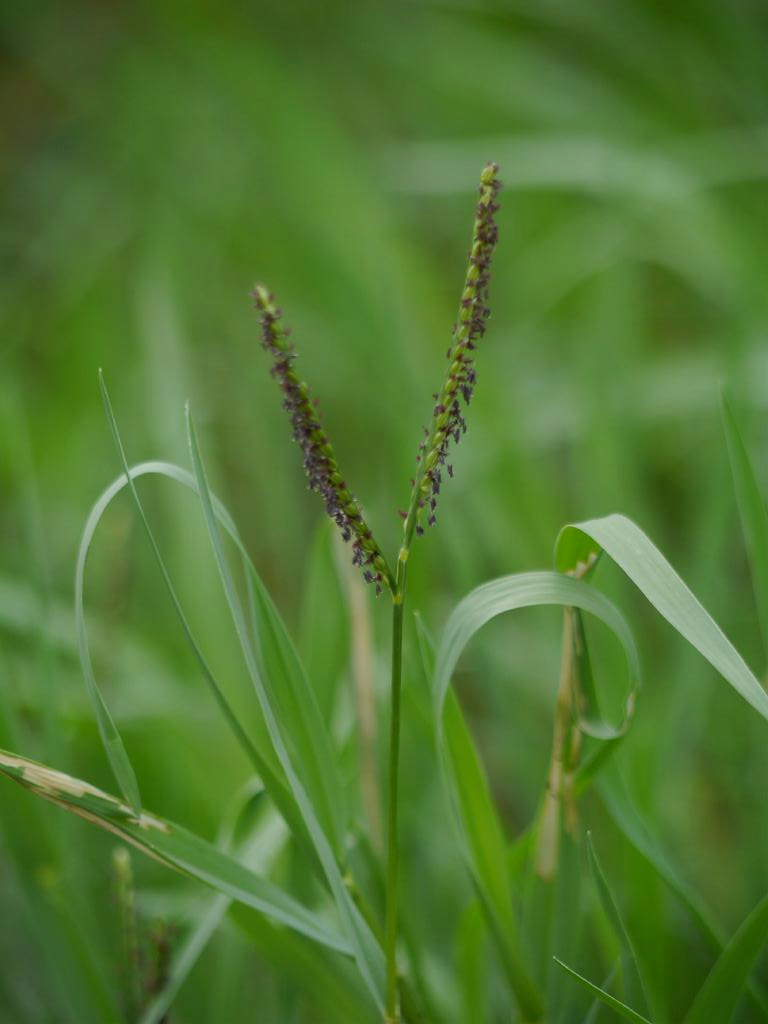
- Knotgrass (Paspalum distichum)

Scientific classification
- Kingdom: Plantae
- Clade: Tracheophytes
- Clade: Angiosperms
- Clade: Monocots
- Clade: Commelinids
- Order: Poales
- Family: Poaceae
- Clade: PACMAD clade
- Subfamily: Panicoideae
- Supertribe: Andropogonodae
- Tribe: Paspaleae; J. Presl (1830)

Genera
- 39, see text

Synonyms
- Arthropogoneae Pilg. ex Butzin (1972)

= Paspaleae =

Tribe of grasses

Paspaleae is a tribe of the Panicoideae subfamily in the grasses (Poaceae), native mainly to the tropical and subtropical Americas but with a number of species introduced to other regions. It includes roughly 680 species in 39 genera. Species in this tribe use either of the C_{3} or C_{4} photosynthetic pathways.

The genera of Paspaleae used to be included in the Paniceae but were assigned to a new tribe following molecular phylogenetic analyses in 2012. The Paspaleae have an ancestral number of chromosomes (monoploid number) of x = 10, unlike the Paniceae sensu stricto with x = 9, and are more closely related to the tribes Andropogoneae and Arundinelleae. The tribe is subdivided into three subtribes, with one genus, Reynaudia, unplaced (incertae sedis) and probably basal to the other genera. The genus Lecomtella is sometimes included but a study suggested this genus was a distinct clade and best treated as separate tribe, Lecomtelleae.

== Subtribes and genera ==
Subdivisions:

incertae sedis

- Reynaudia

Paspalinae

- Aakia
- Acostia
- Anthaenantia (syn. Leptocoryphium)
- Anthaenantiopsis
- Axonopus (syns Centrochloa, Ophiochloa)
- Baptorhachis
- Echinolaena
- Gerritea
- Hildaea
- Hopia
- Ichnanthus
- Ocellochloa
- Oedochloa
- Osvaldoa
- Paspalum (syn. Thrasya, Thrasyopsis, Reimarochloa, Spheneria)
- Renvoizea
- Streptostachys

Otachyriinae

- Hymenachne (syn. Dallwatsonia)
- Otachyrium
- Plagiantha
- Rugoloa
- Steinchisma (syn. Cliffordiochloa, Fasciculochloa)

Arthropogoninae

- Achlaena
- Altoparadisium
- Apochloa
- Arthropogon
- Canastra
- Coleataenia (syn. Sorengia)
- Cyphonanthus
- Homolepis
- Keratochlaena (syn. Sclerochlamys)
- Mesosetum
- Oncorachis
- Oplismenopsis
- Phanopyrum
- Stephostachys
- Tatianyx
- Triscenia
