= Streptostachys =

Scientific classification
- Kingdom: Plantae
- Clade: Tracheophytes
- Clade: Angiosperms
- Clade: Monocots
- Clade: Commelinids
- Order: Poales
- Family: Poaceae
- Subfamily: Panicoideae
- Supertribe: Andropogonodae
- Tribe: Paspaleae
- Subtribe: Paspalinae
- Genus: Streptostachys; Desv.

Type species
- Streptostachys asperifolia Desv.

Genus of grasses

Streptostachys is a genus of South American plants in the grass family.

== Species ==
Two species are currently accepted.

- Streptostachys asperifolia Desv. - Brazil (Bahia, Amapá, Amazonas, Ceará, Maranhão, Pará, Paraíba, Pernambuco, Tocantins, Rio Grande do Norte, Piauí), Fr Guinea, Trinidad and Tobago, Suriname, Bolivia (Santa Cruz), Guyana, Venezuela (Anzoátegui, Bolívar, Sucre, Monagas, Miranda)
- Streptostachys lanciflora R.P.Oliveira & Longhi-Wagner - Bahia

=== Formerly placed here ===
Some species formerly placed in Streptostachys are now placed in other genera.

- Ichnanthus robustus (Renvoize) R.P.Oliveira, A.C.Mota & C.Silva (as Streptostachys robusta Renvoize)
- Keratochlaena rigidifolia (Filg., Morrone & Zuloaga) Morrone & Zuloaga (as Streptostachys rigidifolia Filg., Morrone & Zuloaga)
- Oncorachis macrantha (Trin.) Morrone & Zuloaga (as Streptostachys macrantha (Trin.) Zuloaga & Soderstr.)
- Oncorachis ramosa (Zuloaga & Soderstr.) Morrone & Zuloaga (as * Streptostachys ramosa Zuloaga & Soderstr.)
- Rupichloa acuminata (Renvoize) Salariato & Morrone (as Streptostachys acuminata Renvoize)
