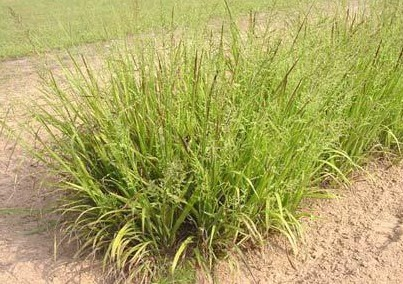
- Coleataenia anceps

Scientific classification
- Kingdom: Plantae
- Clade: Tracheophytes
- Clade: Angiosperms
- Clade: Monocots
- Clade: Commelinids
- Order: Poales
- Family: Poaceae
- Subfamily: Panicoideae
- Supertribe: Andropogonodae
- Tribe: Paspaleae
- Subtribe: Arthropogoninae
- Genus: Coleataenia; Griseb. (1879)

Synonyms
- Sorengia Zuloaga & Morrone

= Coleataenia =

Genus of grasses

Coleataenia is a genus of grasses in the tribe Paniceae of the family Poaceae. Until recently this genus was part of Panicum. In 2010, Zuloaga, Scataglini, & Morrone proposed the transfer of the Panicum sections Agrostoidea and Tenera to the new genus, Sorengia. However, that same year, because one of the new species' synonyms was in the valid genus Coleataenia, Robert J. Soreng determined that Sorengia was not a valid name for the new genus and re-published it as Coleataenia.

== Species ==
Coleataenia species include:

- Coleataenia anceps (Michaux) Soreng (2010)
  - subsp. anceps – beaked panic grass
  - subsp. rhizomata (Hitchcock & Chase) Soreng – small beaked panic grass.
- Coleataenia longifolia (Torrey) Soreng (2010)
  - subsp. longifolia – long-leaved panic grass
  - subsp. combsii (Scribner & C.R. Ball) Soreng (2010) – Combs panic grass
- Coleataenia rigidula (Bosc ex Nees) LeBlond (2011)
  - subsp. rigidula – redtop panic grass
  - subsp. condensa (Nash) LeBlond (2011) – dense panic grass
- Coleataenia scabrida (Döll) Zuloaga (2014)
- Coleataenia stenodes (Griseb.) Soreng (2010)
- Coleataenia stipitata (Nash) LeBlond (2011) – tall flat panic grass
- Coleataenia tenera (Beyrich ex Trinius) Soreng (2010) – southeastern panic grass

== See also ==
- List of Poaceae genera
