= Mesosetum =

Scientific classification
- Kingdom: Plantae
- Clade: Tracheophytes
- Clade: Angiosperms
- Clade: Monocots
- Clade: Commelinids
- Order: Poales
- Family: Poaceae
- Subfamily: Panicoideae
- Supertribe: Andropogonodae
- Tribe: Paspaleae
- Subtribe: Arthropogoninae
- Genus: Mesosetum; Steud.

Type species
- Mesosetum cayennense Steud.

Synonyms
- Bifaria (Hack.) Kuntze 1898, illegitimate homonym not Tiegh. 1896 (Santalaceae); Peniculus Swallen

Genus of grasses

Mesosetum is a genus of Neotropical plants in the grass family, native to North and South America including the West Indies.

Species

- Mesosetum agropyroides Mez
- Mesosetum alatum Filg.
- Mesosetum annuum Swallen
- Mesosetum ansatum (Trin.) Kuhlm.
- Mesosetum arenarium Swallen
- Mesosetum bifarium (Hack.) Chase
- Mesosetum blakei Swallen
- Mesosetum cayennense Steud.
- Mesosetum chaseae Luces
- Mesosetum chlorostachyum (Döll) Chase
- Mesosetum comatum Swallen
- Mesosetum compressum Swallen
- Mesosetum elytrochaetum (Hack.) Swallen
- Mesosetum exaratum (Trin.) Chase
- Mesosetum ferrugineum (Trin.) Chase
- Mesosetum filifolium F.T.Hubb.
- Mesosetum gibbosum Renvoize & Filg.
- Mesosetum loliiforme (Steud.) Hitchc.
- Mesosetum longiaristatum Filg.
- Mesosetum pappophorum (Nees) Kuhlm.
- Mesosetum penicillatum Mez
- Mesosetum pittieri Hitchc.
- Mesosetum rottboellioides (Kunth) Hitchc.
- Mesosetum sclerochloa (Trin.) Hitchc.
- Mesosetum stoloniferum Swallen
- Mesosetum wrightii Hitchc.
