= Coleataenia longifolia =

Scientific classification
- Kingdom: Plantae
- Clade: Tracheophytes
- Clade: Angiosperms
- Clade: Monocots
- Clade: Commelinids
- Order: Poales
- Family: Poaceae
- Subfamily: Panicoideae
- Genus: Coleataenia
- Species: C. longifolia

Binomial name
- Coleataenia longifolia (Torr.) Soreng

Subspecies
- Coleataenia longifolia subsp. abscissa (Swallen) Soreng; Coleataenia longifolia subsp. combsii (Scribn. & C.R.Ball) Soreng; Coleataenia longifolia subsp. longifolia

Synonyms
- Panicum longifolium Torr.; Sorengia longifolia (Torr.) Zuloaga & Morrone

Species of plant

Coleataenia longifolia is a species of grass in the family Poaceae found in North America. Coleataenia longifolia subsp. elongata is listed as a special concern and believed extirpated in Connecticut.

== Distribution and habitat ==
C. longifolia can be found throughout the south and eastern United States. C. longifolia spp. cobsii is found primarily along the edge of the Coastal Plain, stretching from Massachusetts to Florida then west to Louisiana. Another subspecies, C. longifolia spp. longifolia, can be found in the remainder of the native range.

This species is considered a facultative upland species by the United States Department of Agriculture. Although it most commonly grows in non-wetland habitats, it may be observed in habitats such as low woods, cypress savannas, and depression meadows.
