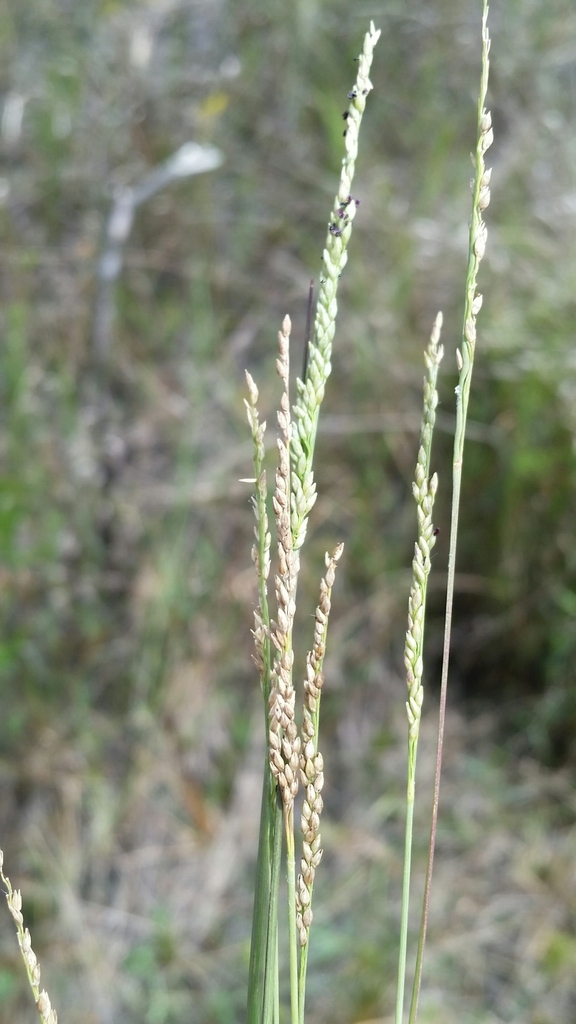
- Near Punta Gorda, Florida

Conservation status
- Apparently Secure (NatureServe)

Scientific classification
- Kingdom: Plantae
- Clade: Tracheophytes
- Clade: Angiosperms
- Clade: Monocots
- Clade: Commelinids
- Order: Poales
- Family: Poaceae
- Subfamily: Panicoideae
- Genus: Coleataenia
- Species: C. tenera

Binomial name
- Coleataenia tenera (Beyr. ex Trin.) Soreng

Synonyms
- Panicum anceps var. strictum Chapm.; Panicum tenerum Beyr. ex Trin.; Sorengia tenera (Beyr. ex Trin.) Zuloaga & Morrone

= Coleataenia tenera =

Species of flowering plant

Coleataenia tenera, commonly known as southeastern panicgrass, is a species of grass found in the southeastern region of the United States (its range encompassing North Carolina to Florida and stretching westward to Texas), the West Indies, Mexico, and throughout Central America.

C. tenera is considered to be a facultative wetland species, and as such can be observed in habitats such as depression meadows, wet pinelands, and bogs. It has been found to be a dominant species within the short-hydroperiod prairie habitat type of Everglades National Park within the state of Florida.
