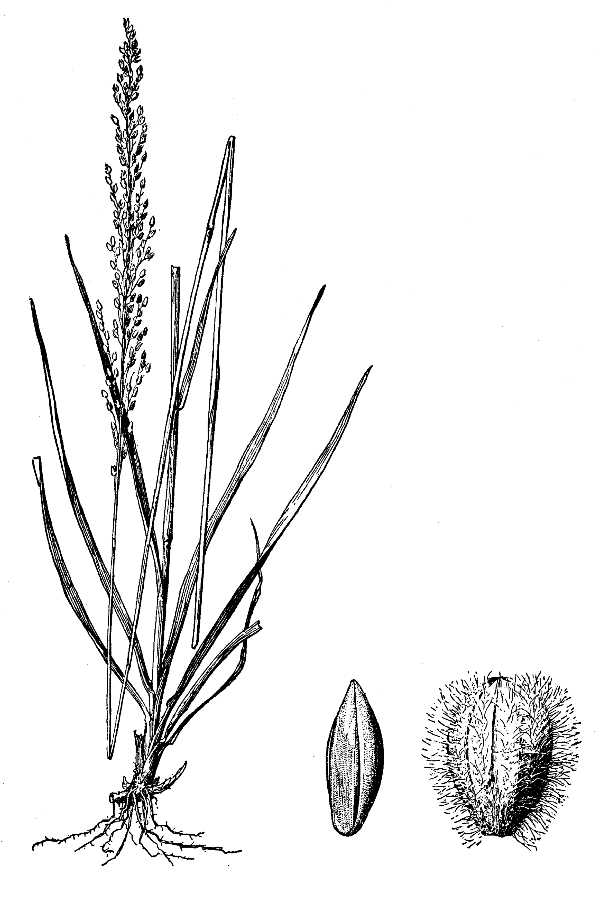

Conservation status
- Apparently Secure (NatureServe)

Scientific classification
- Kingdom: Plantae
- Clade: Tracheophytes
- Clade: Angiosperms
- Clade: Monocots
- Clade: Commelinids
- Order: Poales
- Family: Poaceae
- Subfamily: Panicoideae
- Genus: Anthaenantia
- Species: A. villosa

Binomial name
- Anthaenantia villosa (Michx.) P.Beauv.

Synonyms
- Aulaxanthus ciliatus Elliott; Aulaxia ciliata (Elliott) Nutt.; Leptocoryphium obtusum Steud.; Oplismenus erianthos (Poir.) Kunth; Panicum anthaenantia Kuntze nom. illeg.; Panicum ciliatiflorum Alph.Wood; Panicum erianthum Poir.; Panicum hirticalycinum Roem. & Schult. nom. inval.; Panicum ignoratum Kunth; Phalaris villosa Michx.

= Anthaenantia villosa =

Species of flowering plant

Anthaenantia villosa is a species of grass known by the common name green silkyscale. It is native to the southeastern United States as far west as Texas.

This perennial grass grows up to 4 feet tall. The leaves are up to 12 centimeters long and are lined with silky hairs along the edges. The inflorescence is a pale green panicle with hairy spikelets.

This grass is attractive to cattle and may be part of a forage mix. It is "an indicator of good range condition".
