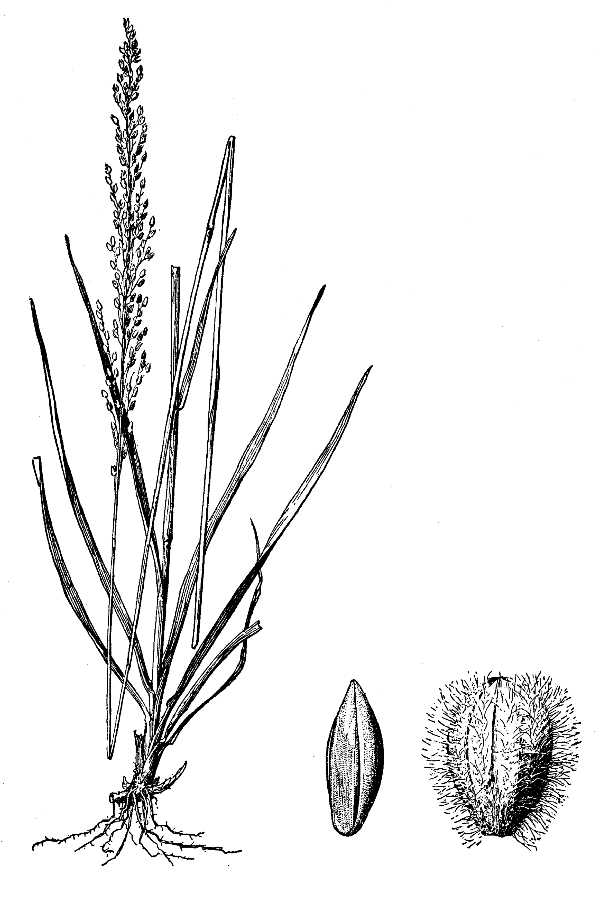
- Anthaenantia villosa

Scientific classification
- Kingdom: Plantae
- Clade: Tracheophytes
- Clade: Angiosperms
- Clade: Monocots
- Clade: Commelinids
- Order: Poales
- Family: Poaceae
- Subfamily: Panicoideae
- Supertribe: Andropogonodae
- Tribe: Paspaleae
- Subtribe: Paspalinae
- Genus: Anthaenantia; P.Beauv.

Type species
- Anthaenantia villosa (Michx.) P.Beauv.

Synonyms
- Aulaxanthus Elliott; Aulaxia Nutt.; Leptocoryphium Nees

= Anthaenantia =

Genus of plants

Anthaenantia is a New World genus of plants in the grass family, native to North and South America including the West Indies. The genus name is sometimes spelled Anthenanthia or Anthenantia.

== Species ==
- Anthaenantia lanata (Kunth) Benth. - from Mexico + Greater Antilles to Uruguay
- Anthaenantia rufa (Elliott) Schult. - southeastern + south-central United States (Texas to North Carolina)
- Anthaenantia villaregalis (McVaugh & R.Guzman) Espejo & López-Ferr. - Jalisco
- Anthaenantia villosa (Michx.) P.Beauv. - southeastern + south-central United States (Texas to North Carolina)

=== formerly included ===
see Axonopus Digitaria Tricholaena

- Anthaenantia asiatica - Digitaria setifolia
- Anthaenantia columbiensis - Axonopus scoparius
- Anthaenantia gigantea - Axonopus scoparius
- Anthaenantia glauca - Tricholaena capensis subsp. arenaria
- Anthaenantia hackelii - Digitaria phaeothrix
- Anthaenantia hagenbeckiana - Axonopus suffultus
