= Osvaldoa =

Scientific classification
- Kingdom: Plantae
- Clade: Embryophytes
- Clade: Tracheophytes
- Clade: Spermatophytes
- Clade: Angiosperms
- Clade: Monocots
- Clade: Commelinids
- Order: Poales
- Family: Poaceae
- Subfamily: Panicoideae
- Supertribe: Andropogonodae
- Tribe: Paspaleae
- Subtribe: Paspalinae
- Genus: Osvaldoa; J.R.Grande
- Species: O. valida

Binomial name
- Osvaldoa valida (Mez) J.R.Grande

Synonyms
- Homotypic Synonyms: Panicum validum Mez

Genus of plants

Osvaldoa is a monotypic genus of flowering plants belonging to the family Poaceae. The only species is Osvaldoa valida.

Its native range is Southern Brazil to Northeastern Argentina.
