= Apochloa =

Scientific classification
- Kingdom: Plantae
- Clade: Tracheophytes
- Clade: Angiosperms
- Clade: Monocots
- Clade: Commelinids
- Order: Poales
- Family: Poaceae
- Subfamily: Panicoideae
- Supertribe: Andropogonodae
- Tribe: Paspaleae
- Subtribe: Arthropogoninae
- Genus: Apochloa; Zuloaga & Morrone

Genus of grasses

Apochloa is a genus of grasses. It includes 15 species native to Brazil, Guyana, and Venezuela.

== Species ==
15 species are accepted.

- Apochloa animara (Renvoize) Zuloaga & Morrone
- Apochloa bahiensis (Renvoize) Zuloaga & Morrone
- Apochloa chnoodes (Trin.) Zuloaga & Morrone
- Apochloa cipoensis (Renvoize & Send.) Zuloaga & Morrone
- Apochloa eligulata (N.E.Br.) Zuloaga & Morrone
- Apochloa euprepes (Renvoize) Zuloaga & Morrone
- Apochloa jauana (Davidse) Zuloaga & Morrone
- Apochloa lorea (Trin.) Zuloaga & Morrone
- Apochloa lutzii (Swallen) Zuloaga & Morrone
- Apochloa molinioides (Trin.) Zuloaga & Morrone
- Apochloa poliophylla (Renvoize & Zuloaga) Zuloaga & Morrone
- Apochloa sipapoensis (Swallen) Zuloaga & Morrone
- Apochloa steyermarkii (Swallen) Zuloaga & Morrone
- Apochloa subtiramulosa (Renvoize & Zuloaga) Zuloaga & Morrone
- Apochloa tijucae (Renvoize) Zuloaga & Morrone
