= Gerritea =

Scientific classification
- Kingdom: Plantae
- Clade: Tracheophytes
- Clade: Angiosperms
- Clade: Monocots
- Clade: Commelinids
- Order: Poales
- Family: Poaceae
- Subfamily: Panicoideae
- Supertribe: Andropogonodae
- Tribe: Paspaleae
- Subtribe: Paspalinae
- Genus: Gerritea; Zuloaga, Morrone & Killeen
- Species: G. pseudopetiolata

Binomial name
- Gerritea pseudopetiolata Zuloaga, Morrone & Killeen

Genus of grasses

Gerritea is a genus of Bolivian plants in the family of Poaceae. The only known species is Gerritea pseudopetiolata, which is native to La Paz Department in Bolivia.
