= Keratochlaena =

Scientific classification
- Kingdom: Plantae
- Clade: Tracheophytes
- Clade: Angiosperms
- Clade: Monocots
- Clade: Commelinids
- Order: Poales
- Family: Poaceae
- Subfamily: Panicoideae
- Tribe: Paspaleae
- Subtribe: Arthropogoninae
- Genus: Keratochlaena; Morrone & Zuloaga
- Species: K. rigidifolia

Binomial name
- Keratochlaena rigidifolia (Filg., Morrone & Zuloaga) Morrone & Zuloaga

Synonyms
- Sclerochlamys Morrone & Zuloaga, nom. illeg.; Sclerochlamys rigidifolia (Filg., Morrone & Zuloaga) Morrone & Zuloaga; Streptostachys rigidifolia Filg., Morrone & Zuloaga

Genus of grasses

Keratochlaena is a genus of grasses. It includes a single species, Keratochlaena rigidifolia, a perennial endemic to Maranhão state in northeastern Brazil.
