= Stephostachys =

Scientific classification
- Kingdom: Plantae
- Clade: Tracheophytes
- Clade: Angiosperms
- Clade: Monocots
- Clade: Commelinids
- Order: Poales
- Family: Poaceae
- Subfamily: Panicoideae
- Supertribe: Andropogonodae
- Tribe: Paspaleae
- Genus: Stephostachys; Zuloaga & Morrone (2010)
- Species: S. mertensii

Binomial name
- Stephostachys mertensii (Roth) Zuloaga & Morrone (2010)

Synonyms
- Panicum altissimum Link (1833), nom. illeg.; Panicum altissimum G.Mey. (1818), nom. illeg.; Panicum elatius Kunth (1829), nom. illeg.; Panicum equisetum Nees ex Döll (1877), pro syn.; Panicum latifolium var. altissimum Rupr. ex E.Fourn. (1886), pro syn.; Panicum megiston Schult. (1824); Panicum megiston f. pauciflora Hack. (1909); Panicum mertensii Roth (1817) (basionym); Panicum proximum Steud. (1853); Panicum tuberculatum J.Presl (1830)

Genus of grasses

Stephostachys is a genus of grasses. It includes a single species, Stephostachys mertensii, a perennial native to the tropical Americas, ranging from southern Mexico through Central America and South America to northeastern Argentina.
