= Tatianyx =

Scientific classification
- Kingdom: Plantae
- Clade: Tracheophytes
- Clade: Angiosperms
- Clade: Monocots
- Clade: Commelinids
- Order: Poales
- Family: Poaceae
- Subfamily: Panicoideae
- Supertribe: Andropogonodae
- Tribe: Paspaleae
- Subtribe: Arthropogoninae
- Genus: Tatianyx; Zuloaga & Soderstr.
- Species: T. arnacites

Binomial name
- Tatianyx arnacites (Trin.) Zuloaga & Soderstr.

Synonyms
- Panicum arnacites Trin.

Genus of grasses

Tatianyx is a genus of plants in the grass family. The only known species is Tatianyx arnacites, native to the States of Bahia, Goiás, Mato Grosso, Minas Gerais, and Pará.
