= Oncorachis =

Scientific classification
- Kingdom: Plantae
- Clade: Tracheophytes
- Clade: Angiosperms
- Clade: Monocots
- Clade: Commelinids
- Order: Poales
- Family: Poaceae
- Subfamily: Panicoideae
- Supertribe: Andropogonodae
- Tribe: Paspaleae
- Subtribe: Arthropogoninae
- Genus: Oncorachis; Morrone & Zuloaga

Genus of grasses

Oncorachis is a genus of grasses. It includes two species native to Brazil and Paraguay.

- Oncorachis macrantha (Trin.) Morrone & Zuloaga
- Oncorachis ramosa (Zuloaga & Soderstr.) Morrone & Zuloaga
