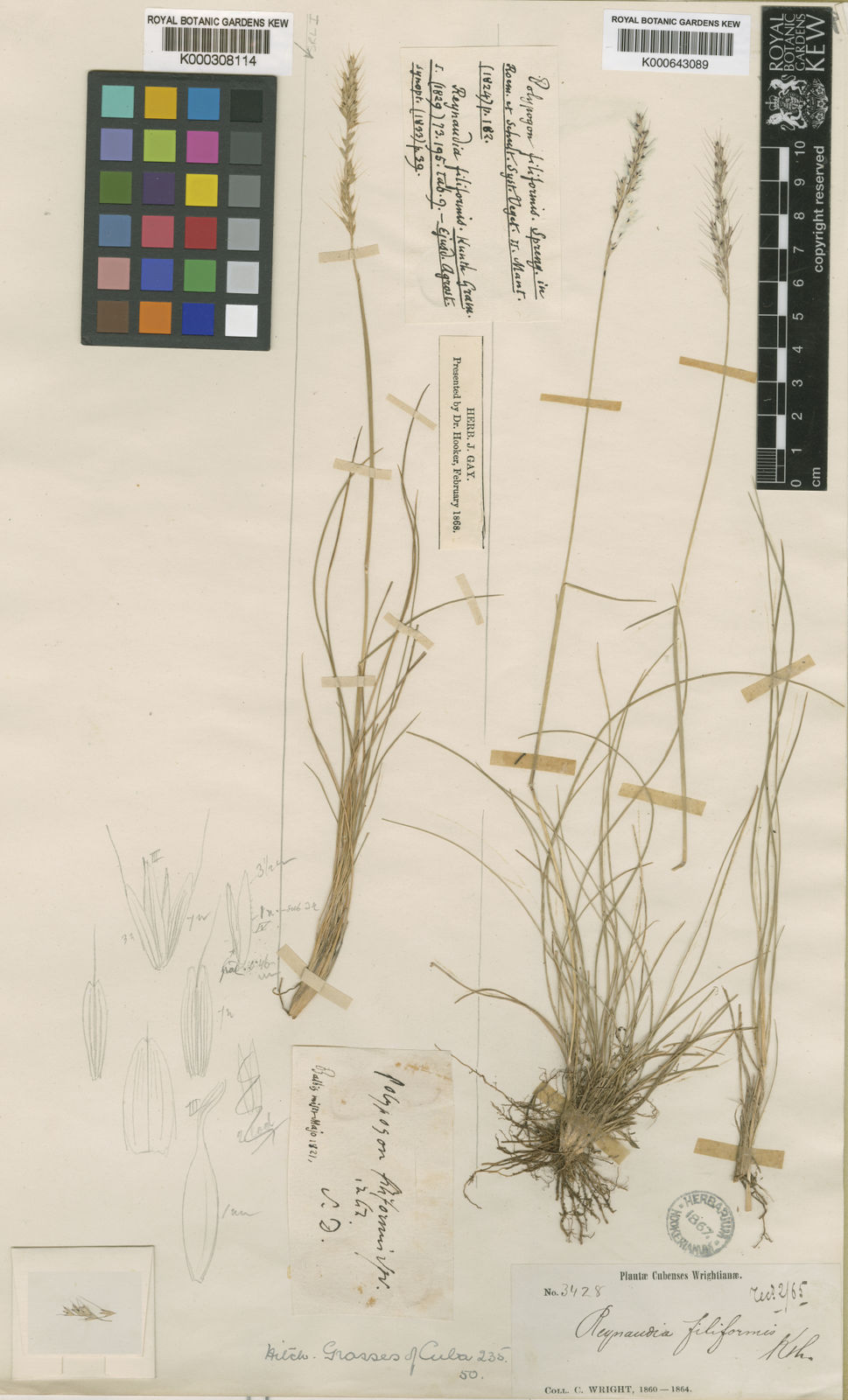
- An illustrated image of Reynaudia filiformis.

Scientific classification
- Kingdom: Plantae
- Clade: Tracheophytes
- Clade: Angiosperms
- Clade: Monocots
- Clade: Commelinids
- Order: Poales
- Family: Poaceae
- Subfamily: Panicoideae
- Supertribe: Andropogonodae
- Tribe: Paspaleae
- Genus: Reynaudia; Kunth
- Species: R. filiformis

Binomial name
- Reynaudia filiformis (Spreng. ex Schult.) Kunth

Synonyms
- Polypogon filiformis Spreng. ex Schult.; Polypogon cubensis A.Rich.

= Reynaudia =

Genus of grasses

Reynaudia is a genus of plants in the grass family. The only known species is Reynaudia filiformis, native to the Greater Antilles (Cuba, Jamaica, and Hispaniola).
