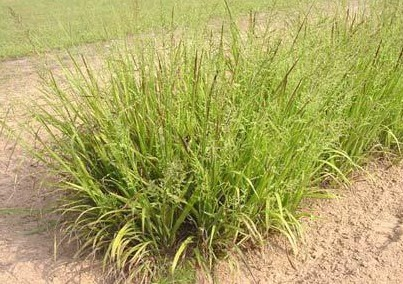

Conservation status
- Secure (NatureServe)

Scientific classification
- Kingdom: Plantae
- Clade: Tracheophytes
- Clade: Angiosperms
- Clade: Monocots
- Clade: Commelinids
- Order: Poales
- Family: Poaceae
- Subfamily: Panicoideae
- Genus: Coleataenia
- Species: C. anceps

Binomial name
- Coleataenia anceps (Michx.) Soreng

= Coleataenia anceps =

Species of flowering plant

Coleataenia anceps (syn. Panicum anceps) is a species of grass known by the common name beaked panicgrass. It is native to the southeastern United States, where it occurs as far north as New Jersey and as far west as Kansas and Texas.

== Description ==
This species is a rhizomatous perennial grass with stems growing up to 1.3 meters tall. The leaves have erect blades up to half a meter tall. The inflorescence is a panicle up to 40 centimeters long bearing pale green or yellowish spikelets. The grass produces an abundance of seed. The seed is curved like the beak of a bird, giving the plant its common name.

== Habitat ==
In the wild this plant grows in moist areas such as swampland and wet woodland habitat.

This grass provides a good graze for cattle and horses throughout most of the year. It does not tolerate overgrazing. Deer also graze the plant and the seed provides food for birds. The plant is also used for revegetation efforts on disturbed land such as mine spoils and roadsides. It is best grown in moist to wet soils.
