= Rugoloa =

Scientific classification
- Kingdom: Plantae
- Clade: Tracheophytes
- Clade: Angiosperms
- Clade: Monocots
- Clade: Commelinids
- Order: Poales
- Family: Poaceae
- Subfamily: Panicoideae
- Supertribe: Andropogonodae
- Tribe: Paspaleae
- Subtribe: Otachyriinae
- Genus: Rugoloa; Zuloaga

Genus of flowering plants

Rugoloa is a genus of flowering plants belonging to the family Poaceae.

Its native range stretches from Mexico, down to southern tropical America, and is found in north-eastern Argentina, Belize, Bolivia, Brazil, Colombia, Costa Rica, Cuba, Dominican Republic, Ecuador, El Salvador, French Guiana, Guatemala, Guyana, Haiti, Honduras, Jamaica, Leeward Islands, Mexico, Nicaragua, Panamá, Paraguay, Peru, Suriname, Trinidad and Tobago, Uruguay, Venezuela and Windward Islands.

The genus was circumscribed by Fernando Omar Zuloaga in Pl. Syst. Evol. vol.300 (10) on page 2164 in 2014.

The genus name of Rugoloa is in honour of Sulma (Zulma) E. Rúgolo de Agrasar (b.1940), who was an Argentinian botanist (specialist in grasses) and Curator and Professor at the National University of La Pampa.

== Species ==
As accepted by Plants of the World Online;

- Rugoloa hylaeica (Mez) Zuloaga
- Rugoloa pilosa (Sw.) Zuloaga
- Rugoloa polygonata (Schrad.) Zuloaga
