= Cyphonanthus =

Scientific classification
- Kingdom: Plantae
- Clade: Tracheophytes
- Clade: Angiosperms
- Clade: Monocots
- Clade: Commelinids
- Order: Poales
- Family: Poaceae
- Subfamily: Panicoideae
- Supertribe: Andropogonodae
- Tribe: Paspaleae
- Subtribe: Arthropogoninae
- Genus: Cyphonanthus; Zuloaga & Morrone (2007)
- Species: C. discrepans

Binomial name
- Cyphonanthus discrepans (Döll) Zuloaga & Morrone (2007)

Synonyms
- Panicum discrepans Döll (1877)

Genus of flowering plants

Cyphonanthus is a genus of flowering plants belonging to the family Poaceae. It contains a single species, Cyphonanthus discrepans, a perennial grass native to Central America (Belize and Costa Rica), Colombia, Venezuela, the Guianas, and Cuba.
