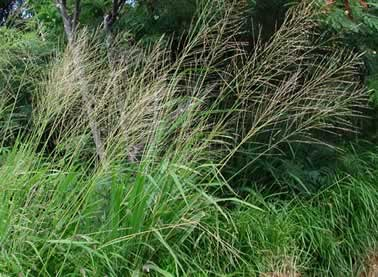
- Homolepis glutinosa

Scientific classification
- Kingdom: Plantae
- Clade: Tracheophytes
- Clade: Angiosperms
- Clade: Monocots
- Clade: Commelinids
- Order: Poales
- Family: Poaceae
- Subfamily: Panicoideae
- Supertribe: Andropogonodae
- Tribe: Paspaleae
- Subtribe: Arthropogoninae
- Genus: Homolepis; Chase

Type species
- Homolepis aturensis (Kunth) Chase

= Homolepis =

Genus of grasses

Homolepis is a genus of Neotropical plants in the grass family. They are native to Mexico, Central and South America, and the West Indies.

They are annual or perennial grasses. At least one species has short rhizomes and some have stolons. They vary in form, growing erect or decumbent, the stems reaching 15 centimeters to 2 meters long. They are mostly unbranched. The leaves are linear to lance-shaped to oblong. The panicle is open or narrow with spikelets up to 1.1 centimeters long.

These grasses grow in open areas and in shade, often in moist and wet habitat.

Molecular phylogeny analysis indicates the genus is monophyletic.

Species

- Homolepis aturensis (Kunth) Chase – Mexico, Central America, Trinidad, Colombia, Venezuela, Bolivia, Ecuador, Peru, Brazil
- Homolepis glutinosa (Sw.) Zuloaga & Soderstr. – Mexico, Central America, West Indies, Colombia, Venezuela, Ecuador incl Galápagos, Peru, Brazil, Bolivia, Paraguay, Uruguay, Argentina
- Homolepis isocalycia (G.Mey.) Chase – Brazil, Colombia, Venezuela, Suriname, Guyana, French Guiana, Panama
- Homolepis longispicula (Döll) Chase – Brazil (Minas Gerais, Goiás, Federal District)
- Homolepis villaricensis (Mez) Zuloaga & Soderstr. – Argentina (Misiones, Corrientes), Brazil (São Paulo, Paraná), Paraguay
