= Plagiantha =

Scientific classification
- Kingdom: Plantae
- Clade: Tracheophytes
- Clade: Angiosperms
- Clade: Monocots
- Clade: Commelinids
- Order: Poales
- Family: Poaceae
- Subfamily: Panicoideae
- Supertribe: Andropogonodae
- Tribe: Paspaleae
- Subtribe: Otachyriinae
- Genus: Plagiantha; Renvoize
- Species: P. tenella

Binomial name
- Plagiantha tenella Renvoize

Genus of grasses

Plagiantha is a genus of Brazilian plants in the grass family. The only known species is Plagiantha tenella, native to the state of Bahia in eastern Brazil.
