= Triscenia =

Scientific classification
- Kingdom: Plantae
- Clade: Tracheophytes
- Clade: Angiosperms
- Clade: Monocots
- Clade: Commelinids
- Order: Poales
- Family: Poaceae
- Subfamily: Panicoideae
- Supertribe: Andropogonodae
- Tribe: Paspaleae
- Subtribe: Arthropogoninae
- Genus: Triscenia; Griseb.
- Species: T. ovina

Binomial name
- Triscenia ovina Griseb.

Synonyms
- Panicum nudiculme Mez

Genus of grasses

Triscenia is a genus of Cuban plants in the grass family. The only known species is Triscenia ovina.
