= Anthaenantiopsis =

Scientific classification
- Kingdom: Plantae
- Clade: Embryophytes
- Clade: Tracheophytes
- Clade: Spermatophytes
- Clade: Angiosperms
- Clade: Monocots
- Clade: Commelinids
- Order: Poales
- Family: Poaceae
- Subfamily: Panicoideae
- Supertribe: Andropogonodae
- Tribe: Paspaleae
- Subtribe: Paspalinae
- Genus: Anthaenantiopsis; Mez ex Pilg.

Type species
- Anthaenantiopsis trachystachya (Nees) Mez ex Pilg.

Genus of grasses

Anthaenantiopsis is a genus of South American plants in the grass family.

Species

- Anthaenantiopsis fiebrigii Parodi - Bolivia, Brazil, Argentina (Salta, Jujuy), Paraguay (Amambay)
- Anthaenantiopsis perforata (Nees) Parodi - Bolivia (Santa Cruz), Brazil (Goiás, Paraná), Paraguay
- Anthaenantiopsis rojasiana Parodi - Paraguay, Argentina (Corrientes, Misiones)
- Anthaenantiopsis trachystachya (Nees) Mez ex Pilg. - Brazil, Bolivia, Paraguay

Formerly included

see Paspalum

- Anthaenantiopsis racemosa - Paspalum lachneum

== See also ==
- List of Poaceae genera
