= Lecomtella =

Conservation status
- Critically Endangered (IUCN 3.1)

Scientific classification
- Kingdom: Plantae
- Clade: Tracheophytes
- Clade: Angiosperms
- Clade: Monocots
- Clade: Commelinids
- Order: Poales
- Family: Poaceae
- Clade: PACMAD clade
- Subfamily: Panicoideae
- Tribe: Lecomtelleae; Pilg. ex Potztal
- Genus: Lecomtella; A.Camus
- Species: L. madagascariensis

Binomial name
- Lecomtella madagascariensis A.Camus

Genus of grasses

Lecomtella is a genus of grasses with the sole species Lecomtella madagascariensis, native to Madagascar. It is the only genus in the tribe Lecomtelleae.

The species and genus were described by Aimée Antoinette Camus in 1925. L. madagascariensis is perennial, has culms 50–300 cm (20–118 in) long, and resembles bamboo, to which it is however unrelated. Contrarily to many other species in the related subfamily Panicoideae, this grass uses C_{3} photosynthesis. It is only found in the Andringitra Massif of central Madagascar, at elevations of 1,600–2,400 m (5,200–7,900 ft), and critically endangered.

The genus is included in the tribe Paspaleae in a 2015 classification although a phylogenetic study had shown in 2013 that it is isolated within the subfamily Panicoideae and best treated in a separate tribe Lecomtelleae.
