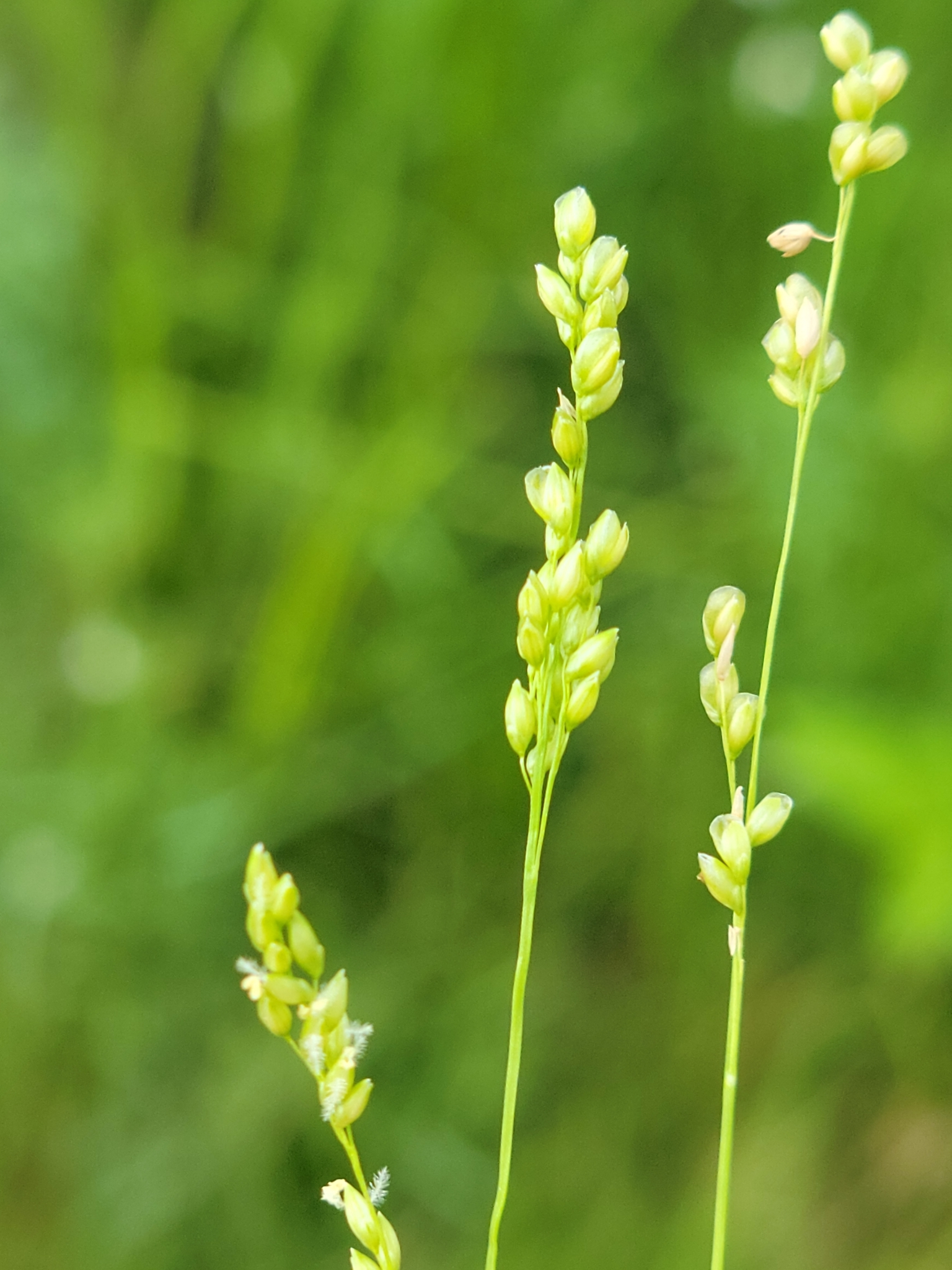
- Steinchisma hians

Scientific classification
- Kingdom: Plantae
- Clade: Tracheophytes
- Clade: Angiosperms
- Clade: Monocots
- Clade: Commelinids
- Order: Poales
- Family: Poaceae
- Subfamily: Panicoideae
- Supertribe: Andropogonodae
- Tribe: Paspaleae
- Subtribe: Otachyriinae
- Genus: Steinchisma; Raf.

Type species
- Steinchisma hians (Elliott) Nash.

Synonyms
- Panicum subg. Steinchisma (Raf.) Zuloaga; Cliffordiochloa B.K.Simon; Fasciculochloa B.K.Simon & C.M.Weiller

= Steinchisma =

Genus of grasses

Steinchisma is a genus of plants in the grass family, native to the Americas but a few of them naturalized in Africa.

Species

- Steinchisma cupreum (Hitchc. & Chase) W.V.Br. - Durango, Jalisco, Zacatecas, México State, Puebla, Veracruz, Querétaro
- Steinchisma decipiens (Nees ex Trin.) W.V.Br. - Colombia, Venezuela, Brazil, Paraguay, Uruguay, Argentina
- Steinchisma exiguiflorum (Griseb.) W.V.Br. - Bahamas, Greater Antilles
- Steinchisma hians (Elliott) Nash - southeastern + south-central United States (New Mexico to Virginia); Latin America (Tamaulipas to Uruguay); naturalized in KwaZulu-Natal
- Steinchisma laxum (Sw.) Zuloaga - from Florida + Durango to Argentina incl. Galápagos; naturalized in tropical West Africa, Assam, Ascension Island
- Steinchisma spathellosum (Döll) Renvoize - Brazil (Paraná, Rio Grande do Sol, Santa Catarina, São Paulo), Paraguay (Alto Paraná, Cordillera, Paraguarí), Argentina (Buenos Aires, D.F., Misiones, Entre Ríos)
- Steinchisma stenophyllum (Hack.) Zuloaga & Morrone - Colombia, Venezuela (Amazonas), Suriname, Brazil (Bahia, Pará, Goiás, Minas Gerais, Mato Grosso)
