= Otachyrium =

Scientific classification
- Kingdom: Plantae
- Clade: Tracheophytes
- Clade: Angiosperms
- Clade: Monocots
- Clade: Commelinids
- Order: Poales
- Family: Poaceae
- Subfamily: Panicoideae
- Supertribe: Andropogonodae
- Tribe: Paspaleae
- Subtribe: Otachyriinae
- Genus: Otachyrium; Nees

Type species
- Otachyrium junceum (syn of O. pterigodium) Nees

Genus of grasses

Otachyrium is a genus of South American plants in the grass family.

Species

- Otachyrium aquaticum Send. & Soderstr. - Bahia, Minas Gerais
- Otachyrium boliviense Renvoize - Bolivia
- Otachyrium grandiflorum Send. & Soderstr. - Venezuela (Amazonas), Brazil (Goiás, Amazonas, D.F., Roraima)
- Otachyrium inaequale Pilg. - Guyana, Suriname, French Guiana, Venezuela, Brazil
- Otachyrium piligerum Send. & Soderstr. - Goiás
- Otachyrium pterigodium (Trin.) Pilg. - Minas Gerais, Amazonas, D.F.
- Otachyrium seminudum Send. & Soderstr. - Goiás, Mato Grosso, D.F.
- Otachyrium versicolor (Döll) Henrard - Guyana, Suriname, French Guiana, Venezuela, Brazil, Colombia, Bolivia, Paraguay, Argentina (Corrientes, Misiones)
