= Panicum gymnocarpon =

Scientific classification
- Kingdom: Plantae
- Clade: Tracheophytes
- Clade: Angiosperms
- Clade: Monocots
- Clade: Commelinids
- Order: Poales
- Family: Poaceae
- Subfamily: Panicoideae
- Genus: Panicum
- Species: P. gymnocarpon

Binomial name
- Panicum gymnocarpon Elliott

Synonyms
- Panicum drummondii Nees ex Steud.; Panicum monachnoides Desv.; Phanopyrum gymnocarpon (Elliott) Nash

Species of flowering plant

Panicum gymnocarpon (commonly referred to as savannah-panicgrass, savannah phanopyrum, swamp phanopyrum) is a species of perennial graminoid native to North America.

== Description ==
Panicum gymnocarpon may reach a height of up to 1 m (3.3 ft). Culms range in length from 60 to 130 cm (2.0 to 4.3 ft). Its leaves are linear in shape and alternately arranged, reaching a length of 15 to 40 cm (6 to 16 in).

When inflorescence occurs, panicles reach a length between 10 to 40 cm (4 to 16 in). Spikelets are glabrous and narrowly lanceoloid in shape, ranging in length from 5.5 to 7 mm (0.22 to 0.28 in). Blooms range from brown to green in color and occur from July to October.

== Distribution and habitat ==
Within North America, P. gymnocarpon is found primarily within the southeastern region of the United States. Its range extends from Virginia to Florida and westward to Texas and Oklahoma.

It is considered to be an obligate wetland species across its range. It can be found in habitat types such as swamps, environments with seasonally flooded soils, stream and lake banks, and wet woodlands.
