= Canastra =

Scientific classification
- Kingdom: Plantae
- Clade: Tracheophytes
- Clade: Angiosperms
- Clade: Monocots
- Clade: Commelinids
- Order: Poales
- Family: Poaceae
- Subfamily: Panicoideae
- Supertribe: Andropogonodae
- Tribe: Paspaleae
- Subtribe: Arthropogoninae
- Genus: Canastra; Morrone, Zuloaga, Davidse & Filg.

Type species
- Canastra lanceolata (Filg.) Morrone, Zuloaga, Davidse & Filg.

Genus of plants

Canastra is a genus of bunchgrass plants in the grass family. Its species are endemic to Brazil.

== Species ==
Species include:

- Canastra aristella (Döll) Zuloaga & Morrone — Minas Gerais, Paraná, Rio de Janeiro, Rio Grande do Sul, Santa Catarina, São Paulo states.
- Canastra lanceolata (Filg.) Morrone, Zuloaga, Davidse & Filg. — Minas Gerais state.

== See also ==
- List of Poaceae genera
