= Altoparadisium =

Scientific classification
- Kingdom: Plantae
- Clade: Tracheophytes
- Clade: Angiosperms
- Clade: Monocots
- Clade: Commelinids
- Order: Poales
- Family: Poaceae
- Subfamily: Panicoideae
- Supertribe: Andropogonodae
- Tribe: Paspaleae
- Subtribe: Arthropogoninae
- Genus: Altoparadisium; Filg., Davidse, Zuloaga & Morrone

Type species
- Altoparadisium chapadense Filg., Davidse, Zuloaga & Morrone

Genus of grasses

Altoparadisium is a genus of bunchgrass plants in the grass family. The species are native to Brazil and Bolivia in South America.

== Species ==
Species include:

- Altoparadisium chapadense Filg., Davidse, Zuloaga & Morrone — Brazil.
- Altoparadisium scabrum (Pilg. & Kuhlm.) Filg., Davidse, Zuloaga & Morrone — Brazil, Bolivia.

== See also ==
- List of Poaceae genera
