= Oedochloa =

Scientific classification
- Kingdom: Plantae
- Clade: Tracheophytes
- Clade: Angiosperms
- Clade: Monocots
- Clade: Commelinids
- Order: Poales
- Family: Poaceae
- Subfamily: Panicoideae
- Tribe: Paspaleae
- Genus: Oedochloa; C.Silva & R.P.Oliveira

Genus of plants

Oedochloa is a genus of flowering plants belonging to the family Poaceae.

Its native range is Southeastern Mexico to Tropical America.

== Species ==
Species:

- Oedochloa camporum (Swallen) C.Silva & R.P.Oliveira
- Oedochloa ecuadoriana (Filg.) C.Silva & R.P.Oliveira
- Oedochloa grandifolia (Döll) C.Silva & R.P.Oliveira
- Oedochloa lanceolata (Scribn. & J.G.Sm.) C.Silva & R.P.Oliveira
- Oedochloa mayarensis (C.Wright) C.Silva & R.P.Oliveira
- Oedochloa minarum (Nees) C.Silva & R.P.Oliveira
- Oedochloa procurrens (Nees ex Trin.) C.Silva & R.P.Oliveira
- Oedochloa standleyi (Hitchc.) C.Silva & R.P.Oliveira
