= Oedochloa ecuadoriana =

Conservation status
- Near Threatened (IUCN 3.1)

Scientific classification
- Kingdom: Plantae
- Clade: Tracheophytes
- Clade: Angiosperms
- Clade: Monocots
- Clade: Commelinids
- Order: Poales
- Family: Poaceae
- Subfamily: Panicoideae
- Genus: Oedochloa
- Species: O. ecuadoriana

Binomial name
- Oedochloa ecuadoriana (Filg.) C.Silva & R.P.Oliveira

Synonyms
- Echinolaena ecuadoriana Filg.

Species of grass

Oedochloa ecuadoriana, synonym Echinolaena ecuadoriana, is a species of grass in the family Poaceae. It is endemic to Ecuador.
