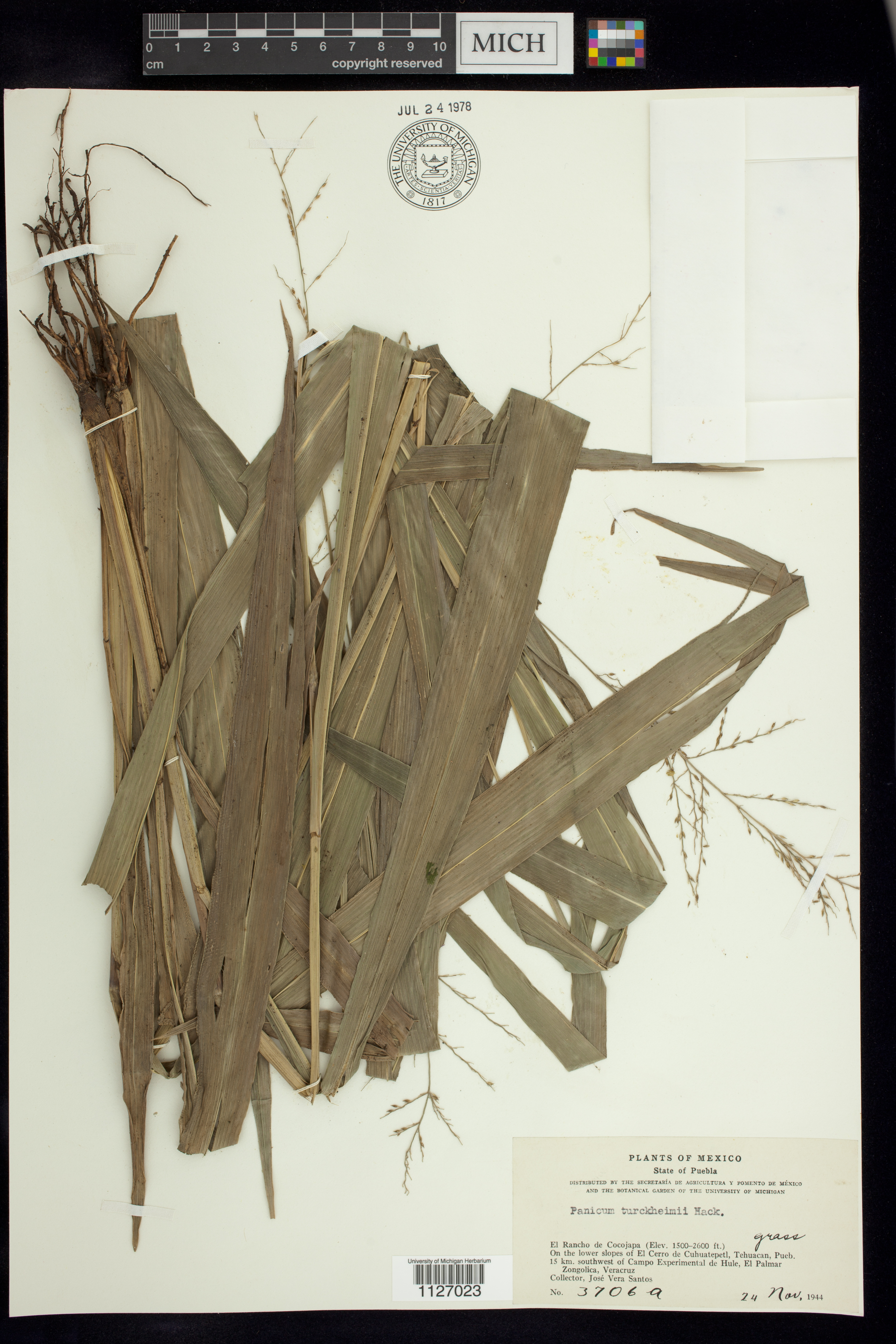

Scientific classification
- Kingdom: Plantae
- Clade: Tracheophytes
- Clade: Angiosperms
- Clade: Monocots
- Clade: Commelinids
- Order: Poales
- Family: Poaceae
- Subfamily: Panicoideae
- Tribe: Paspaleae
- Subtribe: Paspalinae
- Genus: Aakia; J.R. Grande, 2014
- Species: A. tuerckheimii

Binomial name
- Aakia tuerckheimii (Hack.) J.R.Grande

= Aakia =

Genus of grass

Aakia is a monotypic genus of grass in the family Poaceae. It is found in Central America and contains only the species Aakia tuerckheimii. It was described by J.R. Grande in Phytoneuron in 2014.
