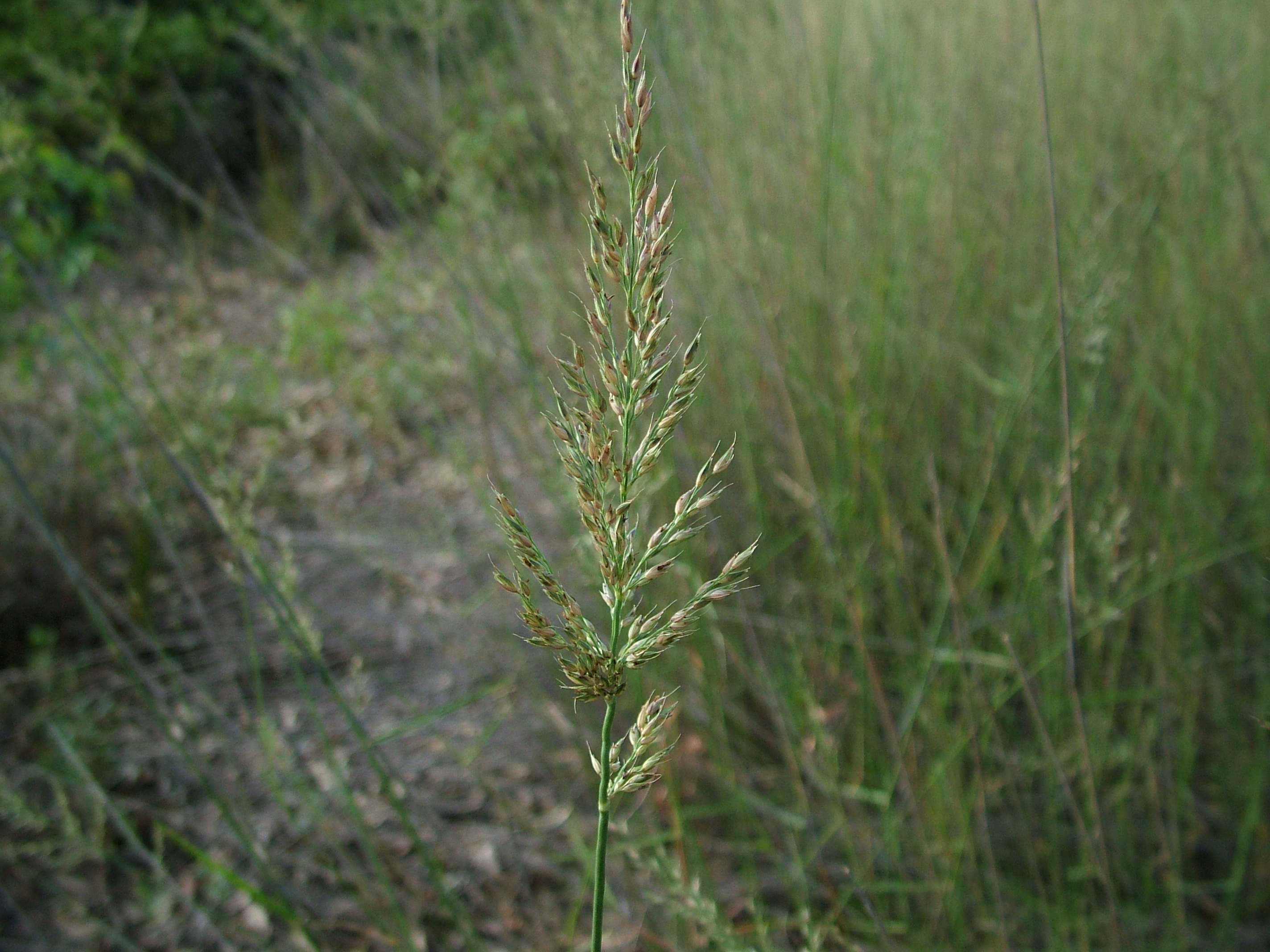
- Arundinella nepalensis

Scientific classification
- Kingdom: Plantae
- Clade: Tracheophytes
- Clade: Angiosperms
- Clade: Monocots
- Clade: Commelinids
- Order: Poales
- Family: Poaceae
- Subfamily: Panicoideae
- Supertribe: Andropogonodae
- Tribe: Arundinelleae
- Genus: Arundinella; Raddi

Type species
- Arundinella brasiliensis (syn of A. hispida) Raddi

Synonyms
- Goldbachia Trin.; Acratherum Link; Calamochloe Rchb.; Thysanachne C.Presl; Brandtia Kunth

= Arundinella =

Genus of grasses

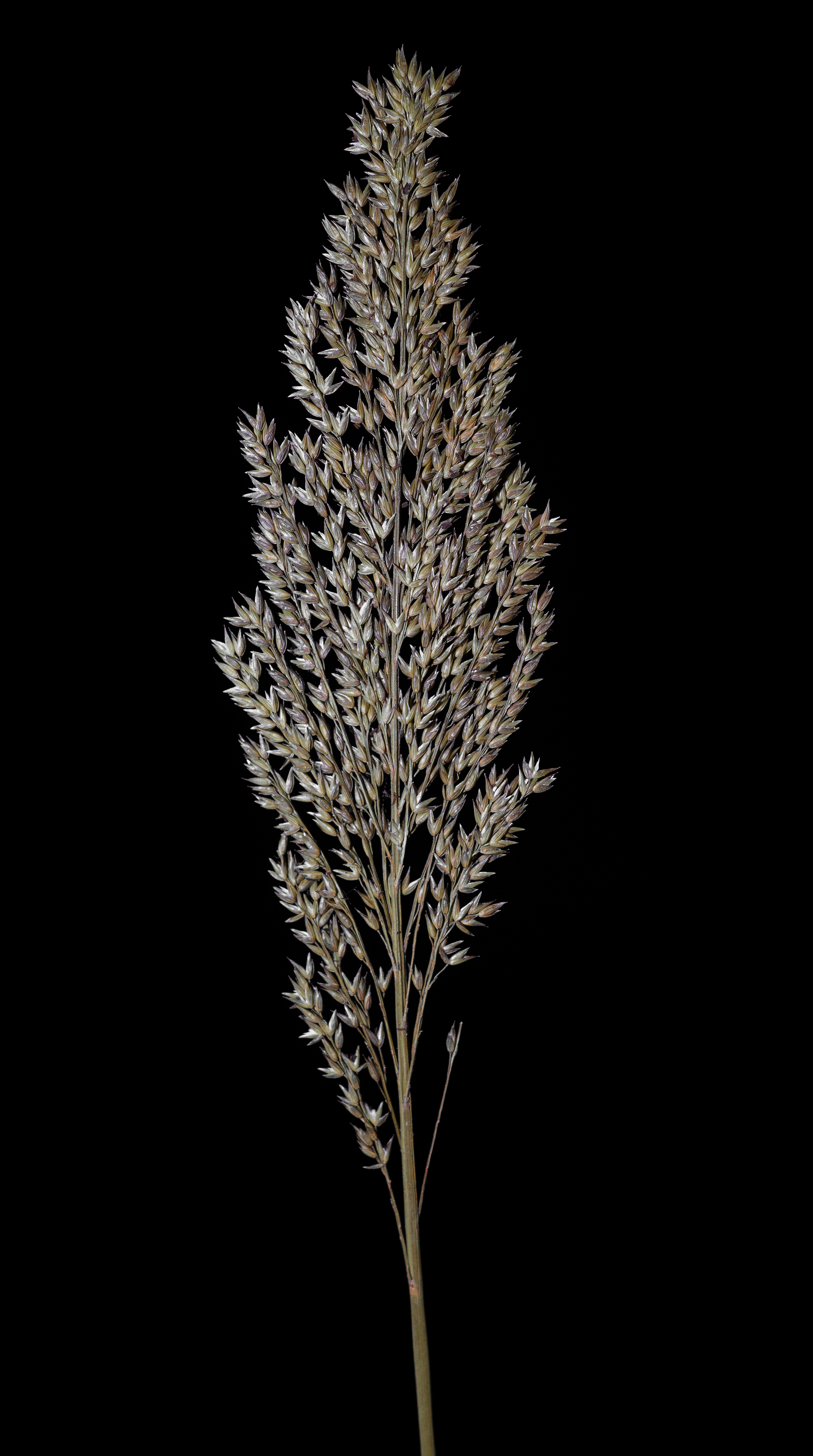
Arundinella leptochloa (Nees ex Steud.) Hook. f.

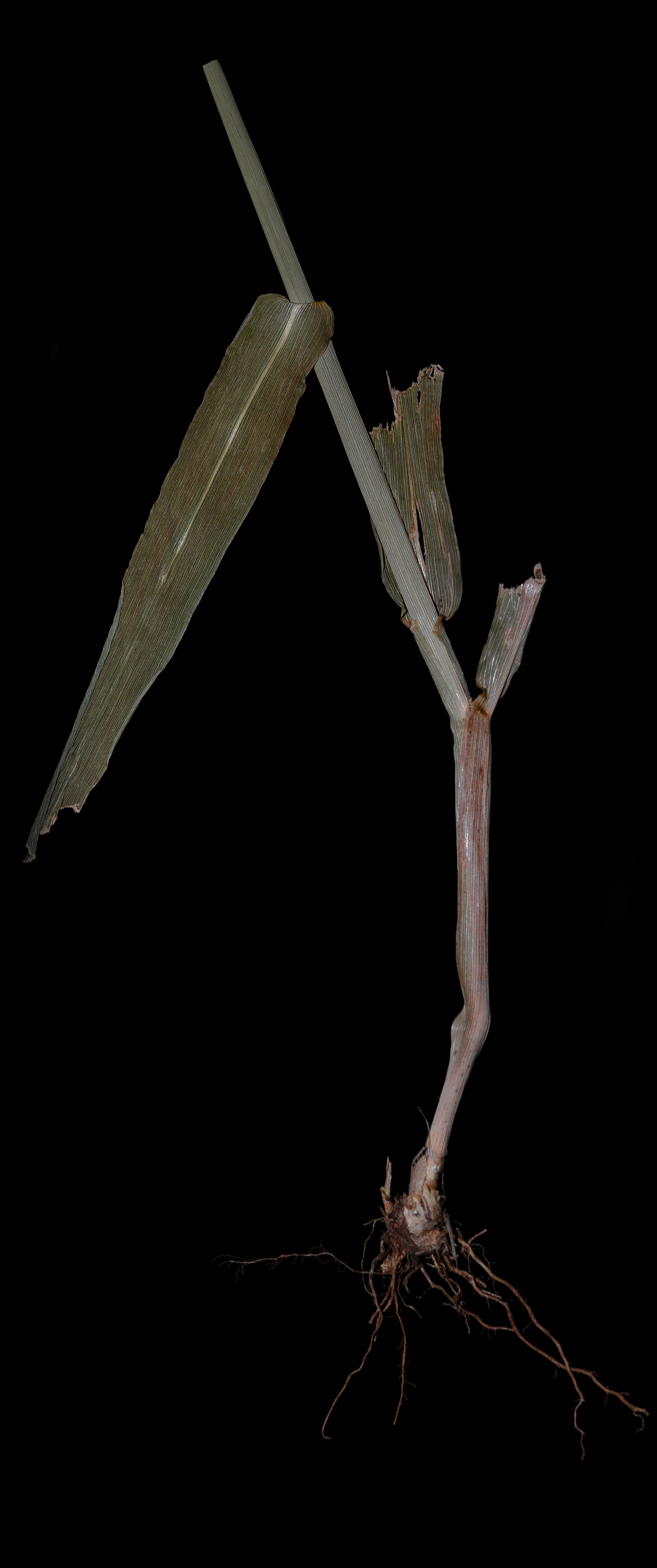
Arundinella leptochloa (Nees ex Steud.) Hook. f.

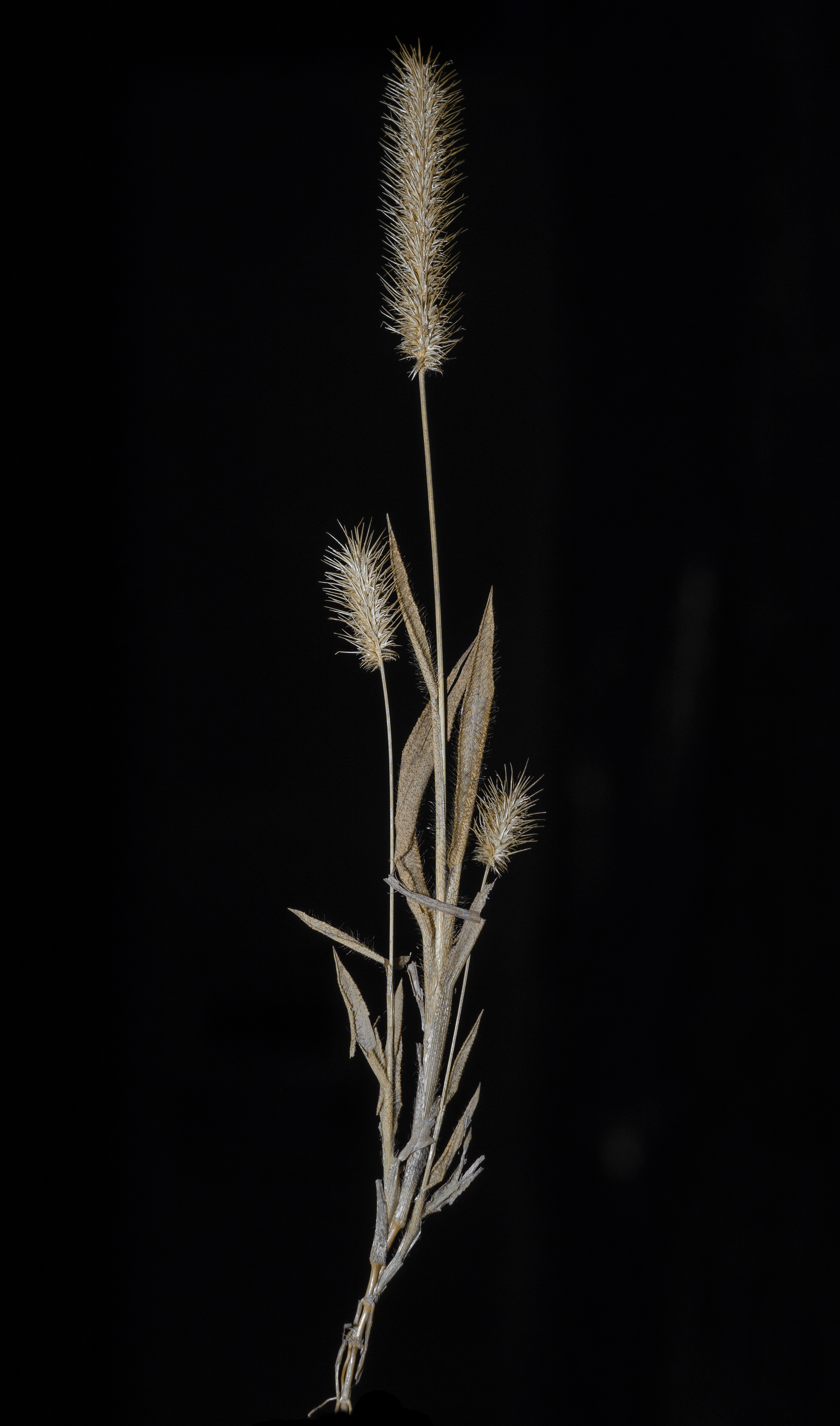
Arundinella spicata Dalzell

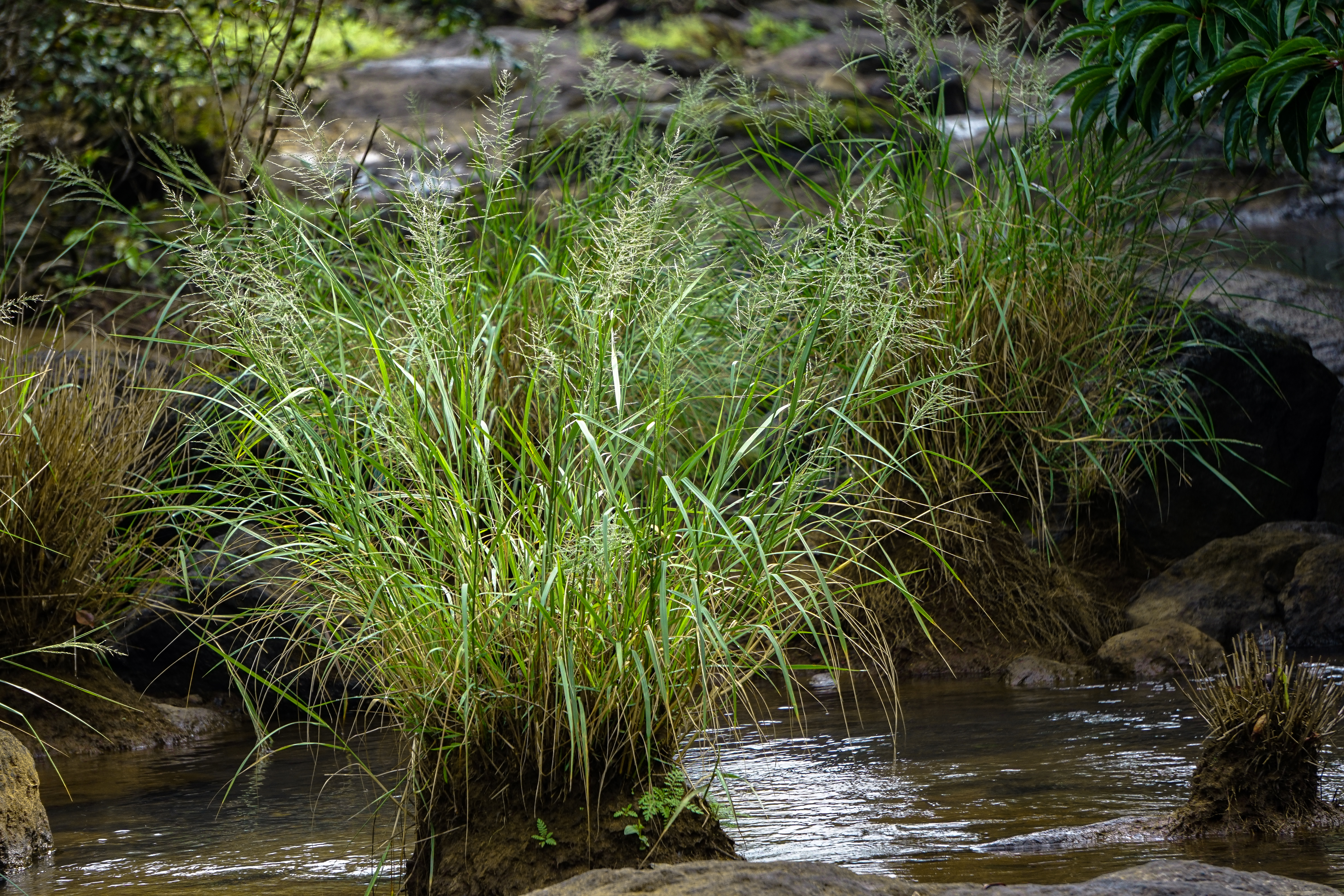
Arundinella nepalensis Trin.

Arundinella is a widespread genus of plants in the grass family, common in many tropical and subtropical regions.

Species

- Arundinella barbinodis - China
- Arundinella bengalensis - China, Himalayas, Indochina
- Arundinella berteroniana - from Mexico + West Indies to Argentina
- Arundinella birmanica - Himalayas, Indochina
- Arundinella blephariphylla - Sri Lanka
- Arundinella cannanorica - India
- Arundinella ciliata - India, Myanmar, Andaman & Nicobar
- Arundinella cochinchinensis - China, Thailand, Vietnam
- Arundinella dagana - Bhutan
- Arundinella decempedalis - Yunnan, Himalayas, Myanmar
- Arundinella deppeana - Mexico, Central America, Cuba, São Paulo
- Arundinella flavida - Guangxi, Guizhou, Vietnam
- Arundinella fluviatilis - China
- Arundinella furva - New Guinea
- Arundinella goeringii - Philippines, Indonesia
- Arundinella grandiflora - Yunnan
- Arundinella grevillensis - Queensland
- Arundinella hirta - Russia, China, Mongolia, Japan, Korea, Vietnam, Myanmar
- Arundinella hispida - from Mexico + West Indies to Uruguay
- Arundinella holcoides - Myanmar, Thailand, Philippines, Lesser Sunda Is
- Arundinella hookeri - Nepal, Sikkim, Bhutan, Assam, Andaman Is, Myanmar, China incl Tibet
- Arundinella intricata - Tibet, Assam, Bhutan
- Arundinella kerrii - Thailand
- Arundinella khasiana - Yunnan, Assam, Bhutan, Myanmar
- Arundinella kokutensis - Thailand
- Arundinella laxiflora - Sri Lanka
- Arundinella leptochloa - India, Sri Lanka
- Arundinella longispicata - Yunnan
- Arundinella mesophylla - Tamil Nadu
- Arundinella metzii - India, Pakistan
- Arundinella montana - Queensland
- Arundinella nepalensis - Africa, southern Asia from Oman to China + Philippines
- Arundinella nervosa - India
- Arundinella nodosa - Yunnan
- Arundinella parviflora - Yunnan
- Arundinella pradeepiana - India
- Arundinella pubescens - Taiwan, Philippines, Lesser Sunda Is, New Guinea
- Arundinella pumila - West Africa, Ethiopia, Indian Subcontinent, Laos, Myanmar, Indonesia
- Arundinella purpurea - Indian Subcontinent, Myanmar, Indonesia
- Arundinella rupestris - China, Thailand, Vietnam
- Arundinella setosa - Indian Subcontinent, China, Southeast Asia, New Guinea
- Arundinella spicata - India
- Arundinella thwaitesii - Sri Lanka
- Arundinella tricholepis - Yunnan
- Arundinella tuberculata - India
- Arundinella vaginata - India
- Arundinella villosa - India, Sri Lanka
- Arundinella yunnanensis - Tibet, Yunnan

formerly included

see Alloteropsis Danthoniopsis Dilophotriche Jansenella Loudetia Trichopteryx

- Arundinella avenacea - Jansenella griffithiana
- Arundinella campbelliana - Jansenella griffithiana
- Arundinella chevalieri - Danthoniopsis chevalieri
- Arundinella elegantula - Trichopteryx elegantula
- Arundinella flammida - Loudetia flammida
- Arundinella funaensis - Trichopteryx dregeana
- Arundinella griffithiana - Jansenella griffithiana
- Arundinella hildebrandtii - Loudetia simplex
- Arundinella hordeiformis - Loudetia hordeiformis
- Arundinella kunu - Trichopteryx dregeana
- Arundinella marungensis - Trichopteryx marungensis
- Arundinella schultzii - Alloteropsis semialata
- Arundinella simplex - Loudetia simplex
- Arundinella stipoides - Loudetia simplex
- Arundinella togoensis - Loudetia togoensis
- Arundinella tristachyoides - Dilophotriche tristachyoides

== See also ==
- List of Poaceae genera
