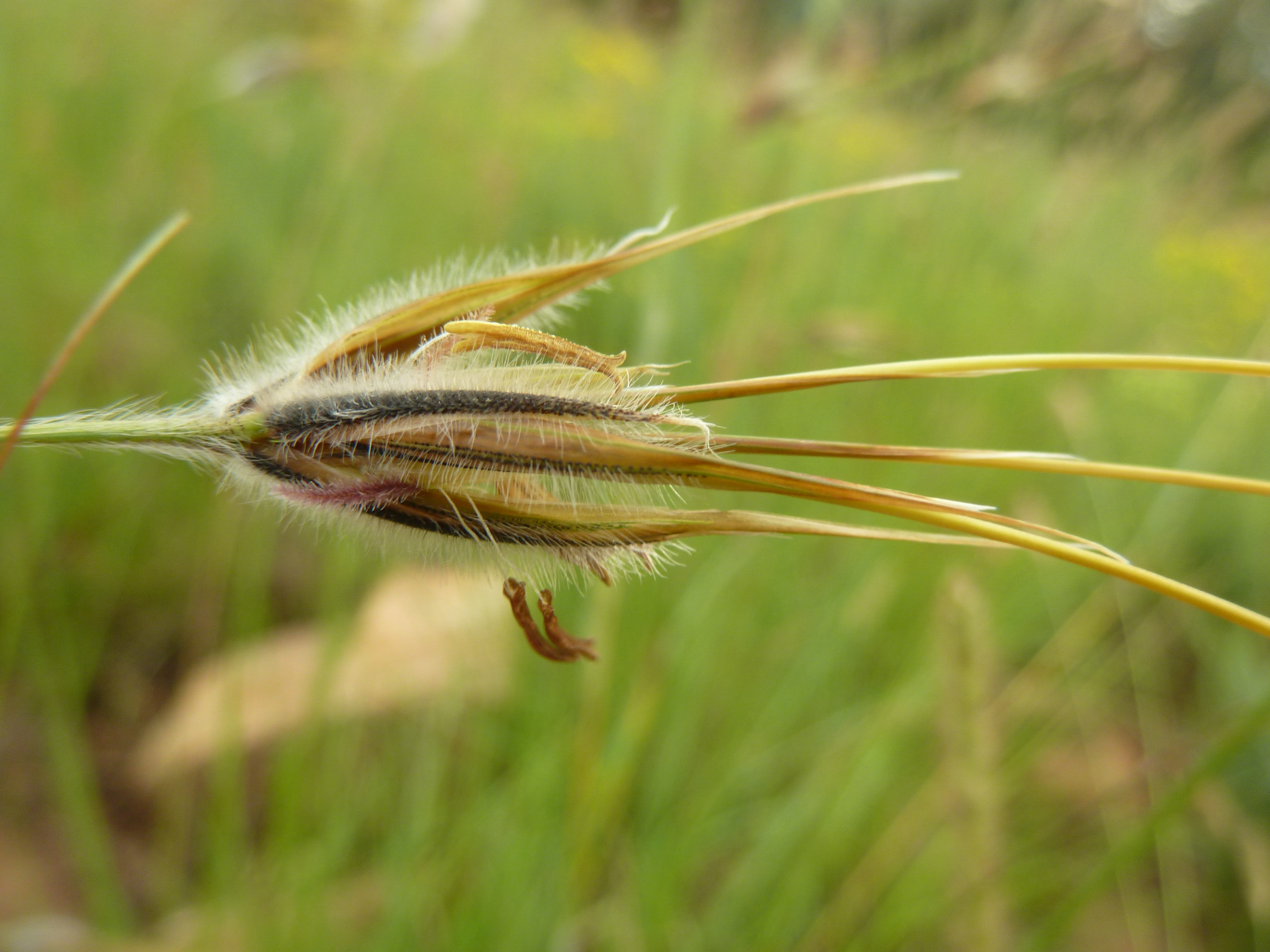
- Tristachya leucothrix

Scientific classification
- Kingdom: Plantae
- Clade: Tracheophytes
- Clade: Angiosperms
- Clade: Monocots
- Clade: Commelinids
- Order: Poales
- Family: Poaceae
- Subfamily: Panicoideae
- Tribe: Tristachyideae
- Genus: Tristachya; Nees

Type species
- Tristachya leiostachya Nees

Synonyms
- Apochaete (C.E.Hubb.) J.B.Phipps; Dolichochaete (C.E.Hubb.) J.B.Phipps; Isalus J.B.Phipps; Loudetia Hochst. ex A.Braun, rejected name; Monopogon J.Presl; Muantijamvella J.B.Phipps; Veseyochloa J.B.Phipps

= Tristachya =

Trident grasses

Genus of grasses

Tristachya (common name trident grasses) is a genus of African and Latin American plants in tribe Tristachyideae within the grass family.

Species

- Tristachya angustifolia Hitchc. - Nayarit in western Mexico
- Tristachya auronitens J.Duvign. - Zaïre
- Tristachya avenacea (J.Presl) Scribn. & Merr. - Mexico, Central America
- Tristachya bequaertii De Wild. - Zaïre, Tanzania, Angola, Malawi, Zambia
- Tristachya betsileensis A.Camus - Madagascar
- Tristachya bicrinita (J.B.Phipps) Clayton - Tanzania, Zambia
- Tristachya biseriata Stapf - Lesotho, Gauteng, Limpopo, Mpumalanga
- Tristachya contrerasii R.Guzmán - Jalisco in western Mexico
- Tristachya hubbardiana Conert - Zaïre, Tanzania, Angola, Zambia
- Tristachya huillensis Rendle - Zaïre, Angola, Malawi, Zambia
- Tristachya humbertii A.Camus - Madagascar
- Tristachya laxa Scribn. & Merr. - Mexico (Durango, Nayarit, Sinaloa)
- Tristachya leiostachya Nees - Paraguay, Brazil
- Tristachya leucothrix Trin. ex Nees - central + southern Africa
- Tristachya lualabaensis (De Wild.) J.B.Phipps - central + southern Africa
- Tristachya nodiglumis K.Schum. - central + southern Africa
- Tristachya papilosa R.Guzmán - Nayarit in western Mexico
- Tristachya pedicellata Stent - Limpopo Province in South Africa
- Tristachya rehmannii Hack. - central + southern Africa
- Tristachya superba (De Not.) Schweinf. & Asch. - sub-Saharan Africa
- Tristachya thollonii Franch. - from Chad to Angola
- Tristachya viridearistata (J.B.Phipps) Clayton - Tanzania, Zambia, Burundi

formerly included

see Danthoniopsis Dilophotriche Loudetia Loudetiopsis Trichopteryx Zonotriche

- Tristachya anthoxanthoides - Loudetia vanderystii
- Tristachya arundinacea - Loudetia arundinacea
- Tristachya aurea - Zonotriche inamoena
- Tristachya barbata - Danthoniopsis barbata
- Tristachya bricchettiana - Danthoniopsis barbata
- Tristachya chevalieri - Loudetiopsis chevalieri
- Tristachya chrysothrix - Loudetiopsis chrysothrix
- Tristachya coarctata - Loudetiopsis coarctata
- Tristachya decora - Zonotriche decora
- Tristachya dregeana - Trichopteryx dregeana
- Tristachya elegans - Loudetia simplex
- Tristachya esculenta - Loudetia esculenta
- Tristachya fulva - Loudetiopsis chrysothrix
- Tristachya glabrinodis - Loudetiopsis kerstingii
- Tristachya inamoena - Zonotriche inamoena
- Tristachya kagerensis - Loudetia kagerensis
- Tristachya kerstingii - Loudetiopsis kerstingii
- Tristachya microstachya - Dilophotriche tristachyoides
- Tristachya minuta - Dilophotriche tristachyoides
- Tristachya multinodis - Dilophotriche tristachyoides
- Tristachya parviflora - Loudetiopsis ambiens
- Tristachya pilgeriana - Zonotriche decora
- Tristachya purpurea - Dilophotriche purpurea
- Tristachya ringoetii - Zonotriche inamoena
- Tristachya scaettae - Loudetiopsis scaettae
- Tristachya simplex - Loudetia simplex
- Tristachya somalensis - Danthoniopsis barbata
- Tristachya stocksii - Danthoniopsis stocksii
- Tristachya tristachyoides - Dilophotriche tristachyoides
- Tristachya triticoides - Loudetia coarctata
- Tristachya tuberculata - Dilophotriche tristachyoides
