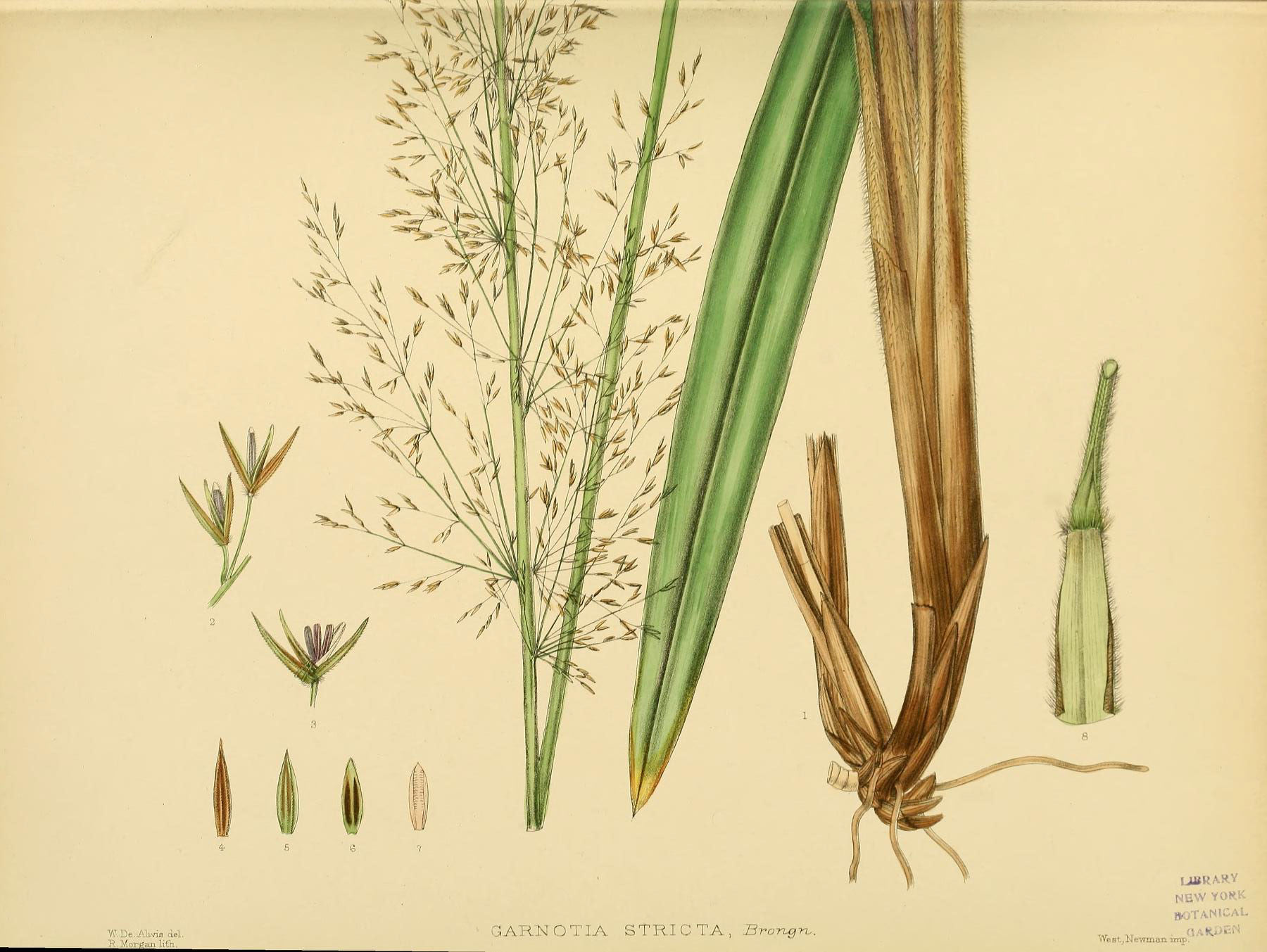
- Garnotia stricta

Scientific classification
- Kingdom: Plantae
- Clade: Tracheophytes
- Clade: Angiosperms
- Clade: Monocots
- Clade: Commelinids
- Order: Poales
- Family: Poaceae
- Subfamily: Panicoideae
- Supertribe: Andropogonodae
- Tribe: Arundinelleae
- Genus: Garnotia; Brongn.

Type species
- Garnotia stricta Brongn.

Synonyms
- Miquelia Arn. & Nees 1841, illegitimate homonym not Meisn. 1838 (Icacinaceae) nor Blume 1838 (Gesneriaceae); Berghausia Endl.

= Garnotia =

Genus of grasses

Garnotia is a genus of Asian, Australian, and tropical island plants in the grass family. Several of the species are native to Sri Lanka and southern India.

Species

- Garnotia acutigluma - China incl Taiwan, Nansei-shotō, Assam, Bhutan, Bangladesh, Southeast Asia, Hawaii
- Garnotia arborum - Maharashtra, Karnataka
- Garnotia arundinacea - Tamil Nadu
- Garnotia cheesemanii - Rarotonga
- Garnotia ciliata - Guangdong
- Garnotia courtallensis - Sri Lanka, Tamil Nadu
- Garnotia depressa - Raiatea
- Garnotia divergens - Vanua Levu
- Garnotia elata - Andaman & Nicobar Islands, Tamil Nadu
- Garnotia emodi - Assam, Arunachal Pradesh, Bhutan, Sikkim, Nepal
- Garnotia exaristata - Sri Lanka, Tamil Nadu
- Garnotia fergusonii - Sri Lanka, Tamil Nadu
- Garnotia foliosa - Vanua Levu
- Garnotia fuscata - Sri Lanka
- Garnotia gracilis - Viti Levu
- Garnotia ledermannii - Papua New Guinea
- Garnotia linearis - Fiji
- Garnotia micrantha - Sri Lanka, Tamil Nadu
- Garnotia normanii - Myanmar
- Garnotia panicoides - Sri Lanka
- Garnotia patula - Fujian, Guangdong, Guangxi, Hainan, Yunnan, Myanmar, Vietnam, Cambodia, Thailand, Malaysia
- Garnotia raiateensis - Raiatea
- Garnotia scoparia - Sri Lanka
- Garnotia sechellensis - Aldabra, Seychelles
- Garnotia spadicea - Sumatra
- Garnotia st-johnii - Raiatea
- Garnotia stricta - Polynesia incl Hawaii, Australia, Micronesia, Queensland, Papuasia, Southeast Asia, Kazan-retto, Nansei-shotō, Assam, Bhutan, Oman
- Garnotia tenella - Indian subcontinent, Yunnan, Guangdong, Indochina, Malaysia, Sumatra, Java, Lesser Sunda Islands
- Garnotia thailandica - Thailand
- Garnotia villosa - Viti Levu

formerly included

see Arundinella Asthenochloa Panicum Phaenosperma

- Garnotia africana - Panicum anabaptistum
- Garnotia barbulata - Arundinella setosa
- Garnotia japonica - Phaenosperma globosum
- Garnotia leptos - Asthenochloa tenera
- Garnotia taquetii - Arundinella hirta
