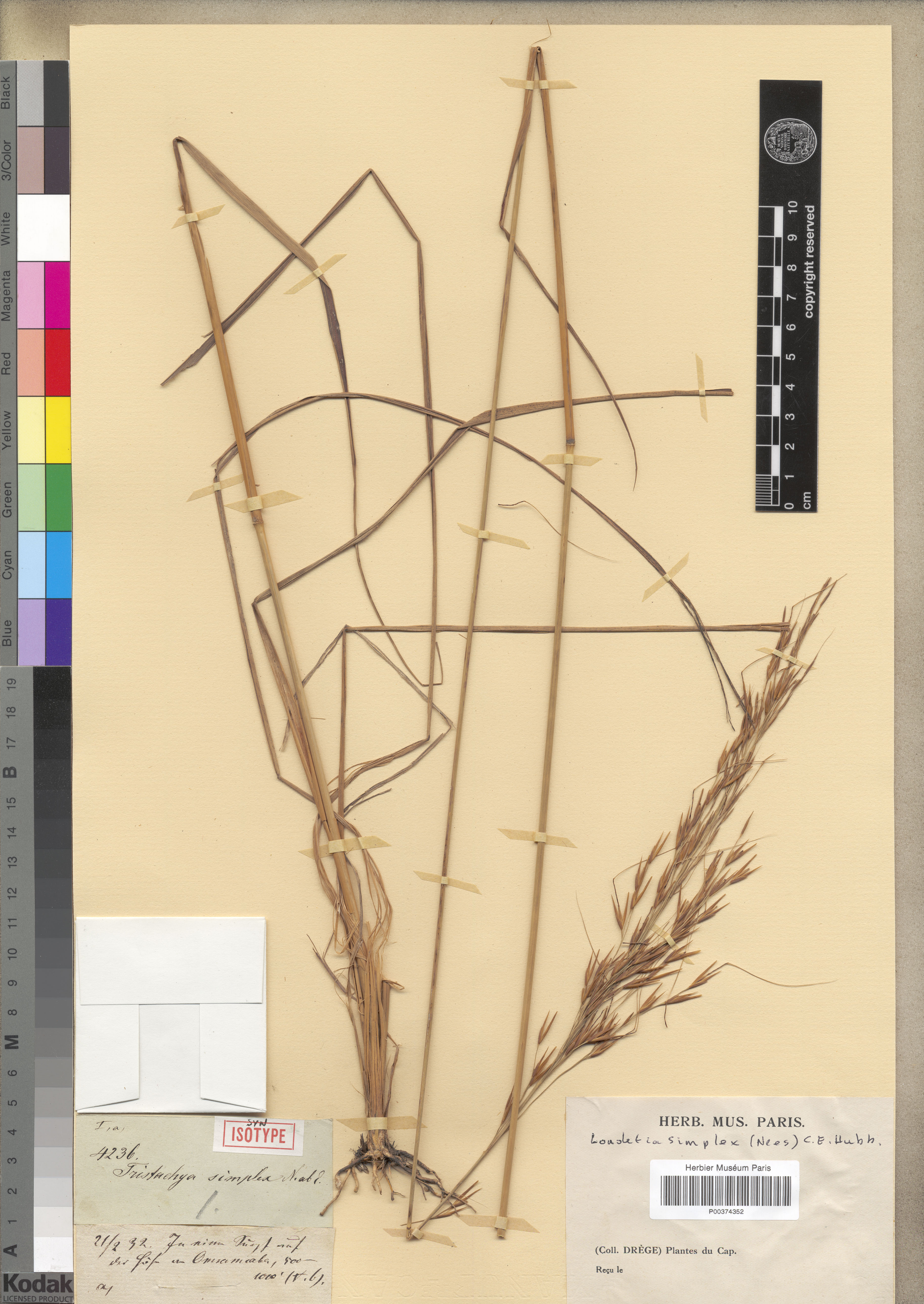
- Type specimen of Loudetia simplex

Scientific classification
- Kingdom: Plantae
- Clade: Tracheophytes
- Clade: Angiosperms
- Clade: Monocots
- Clade: Commelinids
- Order: Poales
- Family: Poaceae
- Subfamily: Panicoideae
- Tribe: Tristachyideae
- Genus: Loudetia; Hochst. ex Steud. 1854, conserved name not Hochst. ex A. Braun 1841

Type species
- Loudetia elegans Hochst. ex A. Braun.

= Loudetia =

Genus of grasses

Loudetia is a genus of African, Arabian, and South American plants in the grass family.

Species

- Loudetia angolensis - Angola
- Loudetia annua - tropical Africa
- Loudetia arundinacea - tropical Africa
- Loudetia cerata - Chad, Central African Republic
- Loudetia coarctata - tropical Africa
- Loudetia cuanzensis - Angola
- Loudetia demeusei - Congo Republic, Zaïre
- Loudetia densispica - central + southern Africa
- Loudetia echinulata - Central African Rep
- Loudetia esculenta - Sudan
- Loudetia filifolia - Madagascar, Eswatini, Mpumalanga
- Loudetia flammida - tropical Africa, South America
- Loudetia flavida - Oman, tropical + southern Africa
- Loudetia furtiva - Cameroon
- Loudetia hordeiformis - tropical Africa
- Loudetia jaegeriana - Sierra Leone
- Loudetia kagerensis - tropical Africa
- Loudetia lanata - southern Africa
- Loudetia migiurtina - Somalia
- Loudetia phragmitoides - tropical Africa
- Loudetia pratii - Central African Rep
- Loudetia simplex - Madagascar, tropical + southern Africa
- Loudetia tisserantii - Central African Rep
- Loudetia togoensis - tropical Africa
- Loudetia vanderystii - Zaire, Congo Republic, Gabon

formerly included

several species now considered better suited to other genera: Danthoniopsis Loudetiopsis Trichopteryx Tristachya
