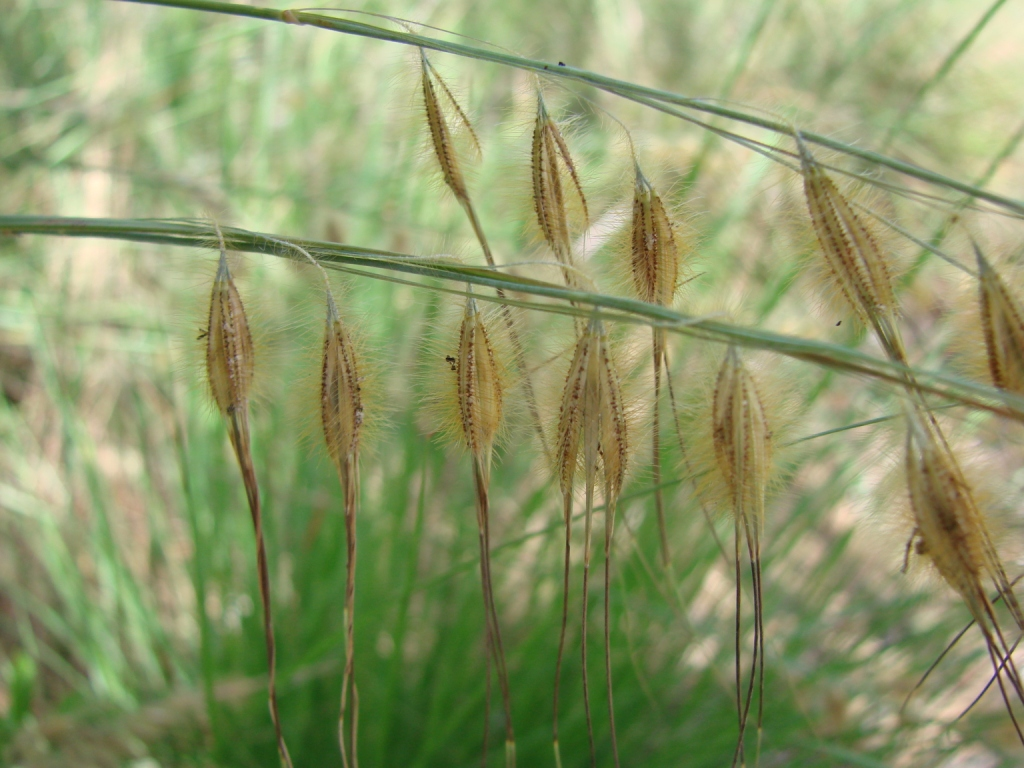
- Loudetiopsis chrysothrix spikelets

Scientific classification
- Kingdom: Plantae
- Clade: Tracheophytes
- Clade: Angiosperms
- Clade: Monocots
- Clade: Commelinids
- Order: Poales
- Family: Poaceae
- Subfamily: Panicoideae
- Tribe: Tristachyideae; Sánchez-Ken & L.G. Clark (2010)

Genera
- 8 genera, see text

Synonyms
- Trichopteryginae Jacq.-Fél. (1962, nom. inval.)

= Tristachyideae =

Tribe of grasses

Tristachyideae is a tribe of the Panicoideae subfamily in the grasses (Poaceae), native to tropical and subtropical regions of Africa, Asia, and South America. There are around 70 species in eight genera. The tribe belongs to a group within the subfamily Panicoideae, sometimes referred to as "centothecoid clade", which consists of the tribes Thysanolaeneae, Cyperochloeae, Centotheceae, Chasmanthieae, Zeugiteae, Tristachyidae, and Steyermarkochloeae; this clade is sister to the remaining groups within Panicoideae.

Genera in the tribe were previously placed in tribes Arundinelleae or Paniceae, subfamily Arundinoideae, or the now-obsolete subfamily Centothecoideae. Species in this tribe use the C_{4} photosynthetic pathway.

== Genera ==
- Danthoniopsis
- Dilophotriche
- Gilgiochloa
- Loudetia
- Loudetiopsis
- Trichopteryx
- Tristachya
- Zonotriche
