= Gilgiochloa =

Scientific classification
- Kingdom: Plantae
- Clade: Tracheophytes
- Clade: Angiosperms
- Clade: Monocots
- Clade: Commelinids
- Order: Poales
- Family: Poaceae
- Subfamily: Panicoideae
- Tribe: Tristachyideae
- Genus: Gilgiochloa; Pilg.
- Species: G. indurata

Binomial name
- Gilgiochloa indurata Pilg.

Synonyms
- Gilgiochloa alopecuroides Peter

Genus of grasses

Gilgiochloa is a genus of African plants in the grass family.

The genus is named after German botanist Ernest Friedrich Gilg (1867–1933) by Robert Knud Friedrich Pilger.

The only known species is Gilgiochloa indurata, native to Rwanda, Burundi, Tanzania, Malawi, Mozambique, and Zambia.
