= Arundinella pradeepiana =

Scientific classification
- Kingdom: Plantae
- Clade: Tracheophytes
- Clade: Angiosperms
- Clade: Monocots
- Clade: Commelinids
- Order: Poales
- Family: Poaceae
- Subfamily: Panicoideae
- Genus: Arundinella
- Species: A. pradeepiana

Binomial name
- Arundinella pradeepiana Sunil & Naveen Kum.

Species of grass

Arundinella pradeepiana is a species of grass found in the Western Ghats, Kerala, India. This grass grows from 30 cm to 150 cm. Botany department Associate professor of Malyankara S.N.K College Prof. Dr. C. N. Sunil and his team found this new species in Pooyamkutty-Edamalayar forest.
