= Garnotia cheesemanii =

Conservation status
- Critically Endangered (IUCN 3.1)

Scientific classification
- Kingdom: Plantae
- Clade: Embryophytes
- Clade: Tracheophytes
- Clade: Angiosperms
- Clade: Monocots
- Clade: Commelinids
- Order: Poales
- Family: Poaceae
- Subfamily: Panicoideae
- Genus: Garnotia
- Species: G. cheesemanii

Binomial name
- Garnotia cheesemanii Hack. (1903)

Synonyms
- Garnotia cheesemanii var. rarotongensis (Whitney) Santos (1950); Garnotia rarotongensis Whitney (1937)

Species of plant

Garnotia cheesemanii, the Rarotongan garnotia grass, is a species of grass in the family Poaceae that is endemic to the island of Rarotonga in the Cook Islands in the South Pacific.

The species is classified as Critically Endangered because of its extremely restricted range and population fragmentation.

== Range and habitat ==
It is endemic to the island of Rarotonga in the Cook Islands. It grows on rocky well-drained substrates with sparse vegetative cover on a north-east facing basaltic cliff under the trees rata (Metrosideros collina) and pua (Fagraea berteroana), between 350 and 450 meters elevation.

== Taxonomy ==
It was described by Eduard Hackel in: Trans. Linn. Soc. London, Bot. 6: 303. in 1903.
