= Trichopteryx =

Trichopteryx is the scientific name of two genera of organisms and may refer to:

- Trichopteryx (moth), a genus of moths in the family Geometridae
- Trichopteryx (plant), a genus of plants in the family Poaceae
