= Trichopteryx (plant) =

Scientific classification
- Kingdom: Plantae
- Clade: Tracheophytes
- Clade: Angiosperms
- Clade: Monocots
- Clade: Commelinids
- Order: Poales
- Family: Poaceae
- Subfamily: Panicoideae
- Tribe: Tristachyideae
- Genus: Trichopteryx; Nees

Type species
- Trichopteryx dregeana Nees ex Lindl.

Synonyms
- Danthonia sect. Trichopteryx (Nees) Steud.

Genus of plants

Trichopteryx is a genus of African plants in the grass family.

Species

- Trichopteryx dregeana Nees
- Trichopteryx elegantula (Hook.f.) Stapf
- Trichopteryx fruticulosa Chiov.
- Trichopteryx marungensis Chiov.
- Trichopteryx stolziana Henrard

formerly included

numerous species now considered better suited to other genera: Danthoniopsis Loudetia Loudetiopsis Tristachya
