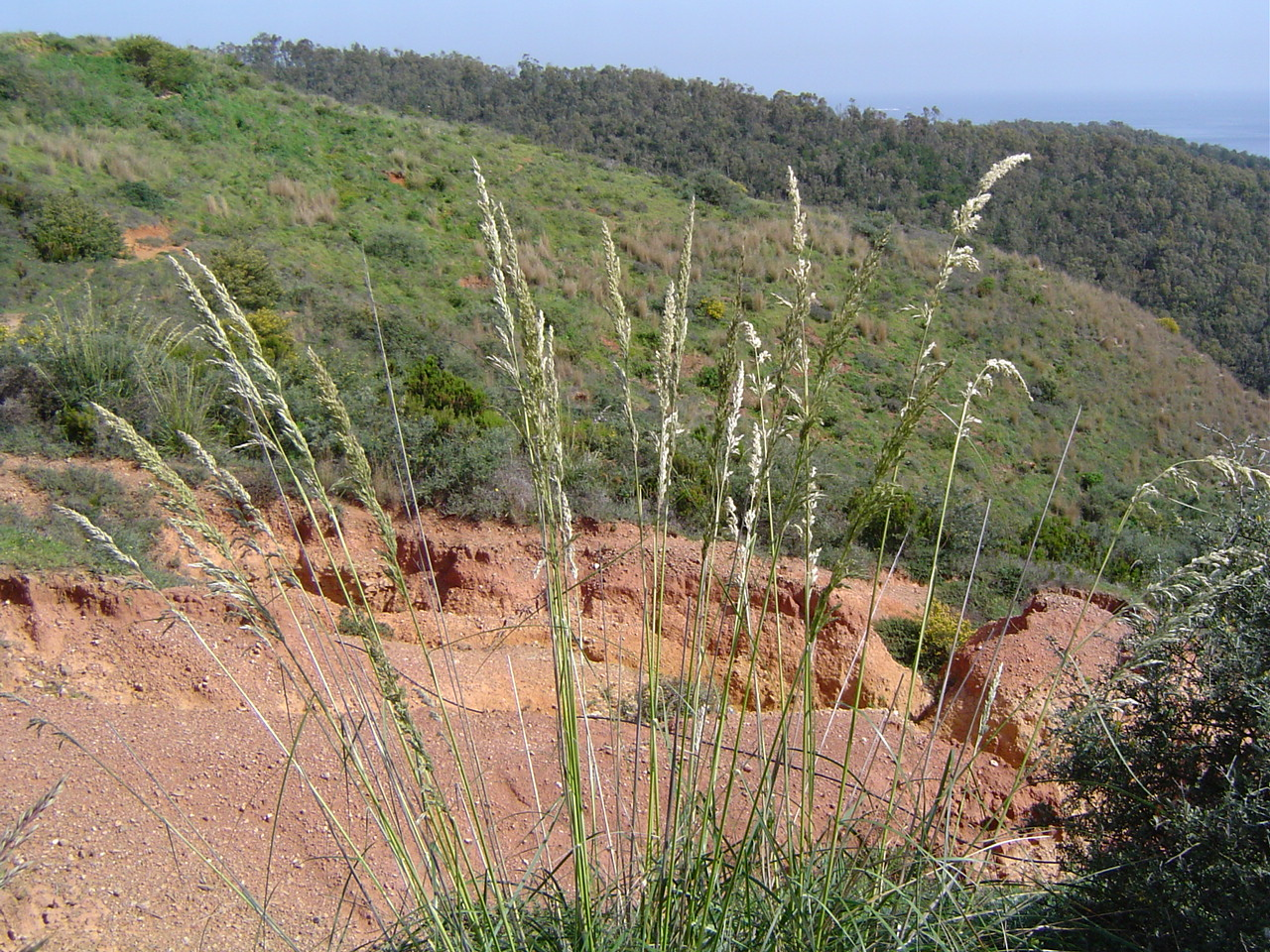
- Ampelodesmos mauritanicus

Scientific classification
- Kingdom: Plantae
- Clade: Embryophytes
- Clade: Tracheophytes
- Clade: Spermatophytes
- Clade: Angiosperms
- Clade: Monocots
- Clade: Commelinids
- Order: Poales
- Family: Poaceae
- Clade: BOP clade
- Subfamily: Pooideae
- Supertribe: Stipodae
- Tribe: Ampelodesmeae; Tutin (1978)
- Genus: Ampelodesmos; Link, 1827

Type species
- Ampelodesmos tenax (synonym of A. mauritanicus) (Vahl) Link.

Synonyms
- Ampelodonax Lojac.

= Ampelodesmos =

Mauritania grass

Genus of grasses

Ampelodesmos is a genus of Mediterranean plants in the grass family, which is known by the common names stramma, Mauritania grass, rope grass, and dis(s) grass. It is classified in its own tribe Ampelodesmeae within the grass subfamily Pooideae.

The genus probably originated through ancient hybrid speciation, as a cross between parents from tribes Stipeae and Phaenospermateae.

Ampelodesmos mauritanicus is a large clumping perennial bunchgrass, which is native to the Mediterranean region. It has been introduced outside its native range and is cultivated as an ornamental grass. Its nodding flower panicles can be nearly two feet long. The plant can become an Invasive species in non-native ecosystems beyond the Mediterranean Basin. In its native area it is used as a fiber for making mats, brooms, and twine. The leaves of this grass possess sharp edges and can inflict small lacerations on exposed skin.

The genus name comes from the Greek ampelos, "vine", and desmos, "bond", from its former use as a string to tie up grapevines.

Species

- Ampelodesmos ampelodesmon (Cirillo) Kerguélen - Sicily
- Ampelodesmos mauritanicus (Poir.) T.Durand & Schinz - Spain incl Balearic Is, France incl Corsica, Italy incl Sardinia + Sicily, Greece, Algeria, Morocco, Tunisia, Libya

formerly included

see Cortaderia

- Ampelodesmos australis - Cortaderia pilosa
