= Danthoniopsis =

Scientific classification
- Kingdom: Plantae
- Clade: Tracheophytes
- Clade: Angiosperms
- Clade: Monocots
- Clade: Commelinids
- Order: Poales
- Family: Poaceae
- Subfamily: Panicoideae
- Tribe: Tristachyideae
- Genus: Danthoniopsis; Stapf

Type species
- Danthoniopsis gossweileri Stapf

Synonyms
- Gazachloa J.B.Phipps; Jacquesfelixia J.B.Phipps; Petrina J.B.Phipps; Rattraya J.B.Phipps; Xerodanthia J.B.Phipps; Pleioneura (C.E.Hubb.) J.B.Phipps 1972, illegitimate homonym, not Rech.f. 1951 (Caryophyllaceae)

Genus of plants

Danthoniopsis is a genus of Asian and African plants in the grass family.

Species

- Danthoniopsis acutigluma Chippind. - Zaïre, Zambia
- Danthoniopsis aptera R.I.S.Correia & Phipps - Angola
- Danthoniopsis barbata (Nees) C.E.Hubb. - eastern Africa, Arabian Peninsula
- Danthoniopsis chevalieri A.Camus & C.E.Hubb. - western Africa
- Danthoniopsis chimanimaniensis (J.B.Phipps) Clayton - Zimbabwe, Mozambique
- Danthoniopsis dinteri (Pilg.) C.E.Hubb. - southern Africa
- Danthoniopsis lignosa C.E.Hubb. - Angola., Namibia
- Danthoniopsis parva (J.B.Phipps) Clayton - Limpopo
- Danthoniopsis petiolata (J.B.Phipps) Clayton - Zambia, Zimbabwe
- Danthoniopsis pruinosa C.E.Hubb. - Tanzania, Zambia, Zimbabwe, Limpopo, Mpumalanga, KwaZulu-Natal
- Danthoniopsis ramosa (Stapf) Clayton - Namibia, Cape Province
- Danthoniopsis scopulorum (J.B.Phipps) J.B.Phipps - KwaZulu-Natal
- Danthoniopsis simulans (C.E.Hubb.) Clayton - Central African Republic
- Danthoniopsis stocksii (Boiss.) C.E.Hubb. - Iran, Pakistan
- Danthoniopsis viridis (Rendle) C.E.Hubb. - Congo Republic, Zaïre, Angola, Zambia, Zimbabwe
- Danthoniopsis wasaensis C.E.Hubb. - Zaïre

Formerly included

see Dilophotriche Jansenella Tristachya

- Danthoniopsis griffithiana - Jansenella griffithiana
- Danthoniopsis humbertii - Tristachya humbertii
- Danthoniopsis multinodis - Dilophotriche tristachyoides
- Danthoniopsis occidentalis - Dilophotriche occidentalis
- Danthoniopsis pobeguinii - Dilophotriche pobeguinii
- Danthoniopsis purpurea - Dilophotriche tristachyoides
- Danthoniopsis tristachyoides - Dilophotriche tristachyoides
- Danthoniopsis tuberculata - Dilophotriche tristachyoides
