= Zonotriche =

Scientific classification
- Kingdom: Plantae
- Clade: Tracheophytes
- Clade: Angiosperms
- Clade: Monocots
- Clade: Commelinids
- Order: Poales
- Family: Poaceae
- Subfamily: Panicoideae
- Tribe: Tristachyideae
- Genus: Zonotriche (C.E.Hubb.) Phipps

Type species
- Tristachya decora Stapf

Synonyms
- Tristachya sect. Zonotriche C.E. Hubb.; Piptostachya (C.E.Hubb.) J.B.Phipps; Mitwabachloa J.B.Phipps

Genus of grasses

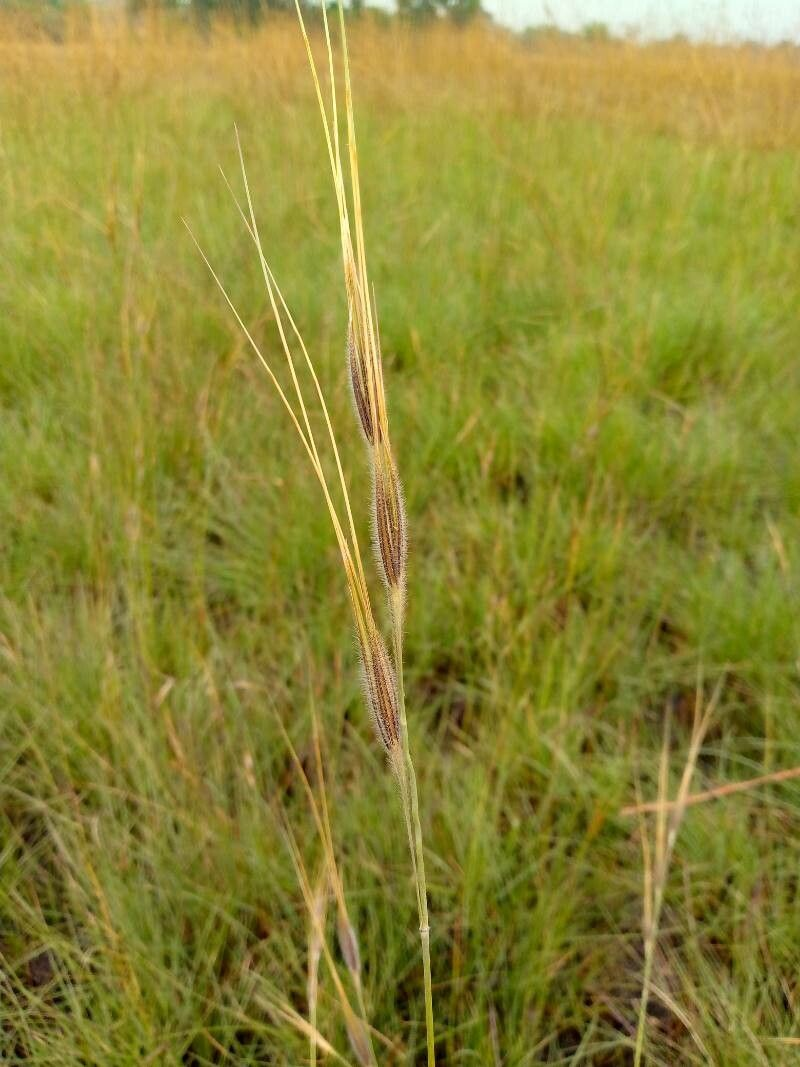
Zonotriche decora

Zonotriche is a genus of African plants in the grass family.

Species

- Zonotriche brunnea (J.B.Phipps) Clayton - Zaïre
- Zonotriche decora (Stapf) J.B.Phipps - Zaïre, Tanzania, Angola, Zambia
- Zonotriche inamoena (K.Schum.) Clayton - Zaïre, Tanzania, Angola, Zambia, Malawi, Mozambique, Zimbabwe
