= Phaenosperma =

Scientific classification
- Kingdom: Plantae
- Clade: Tracheophytes
- Clade: Angiosperms
- Clade: Monocots
- Clade: Commelinids
- Order: Poales
- Family: Poaceae
- Subfamily: Pooideae
- Tribe: Phaenospermateae
- Genus: Phaenosperma; Munro ex Benth.
- Species: P. globosum

Binomial name
- Phaenosperma globosum Munro ex Benth.

Synonyms
- Euthryptochloa Cope; Garnotia japonica Hack.; Euthryptochloa longiligula Cope

Genus of grasses

Phaenosperma is a genus of Asian plants in the grass family. The only known species is Phaenosperma globosum, native to China (Anhui, Gansu, Guangxi, Hubei, Jiangsu, Jiangxi, Shaanxi, Sichuan, Taiwan, Tibet, Yunnan, Zhejiang), Japan, Korea, Assam, and Bhutan.
