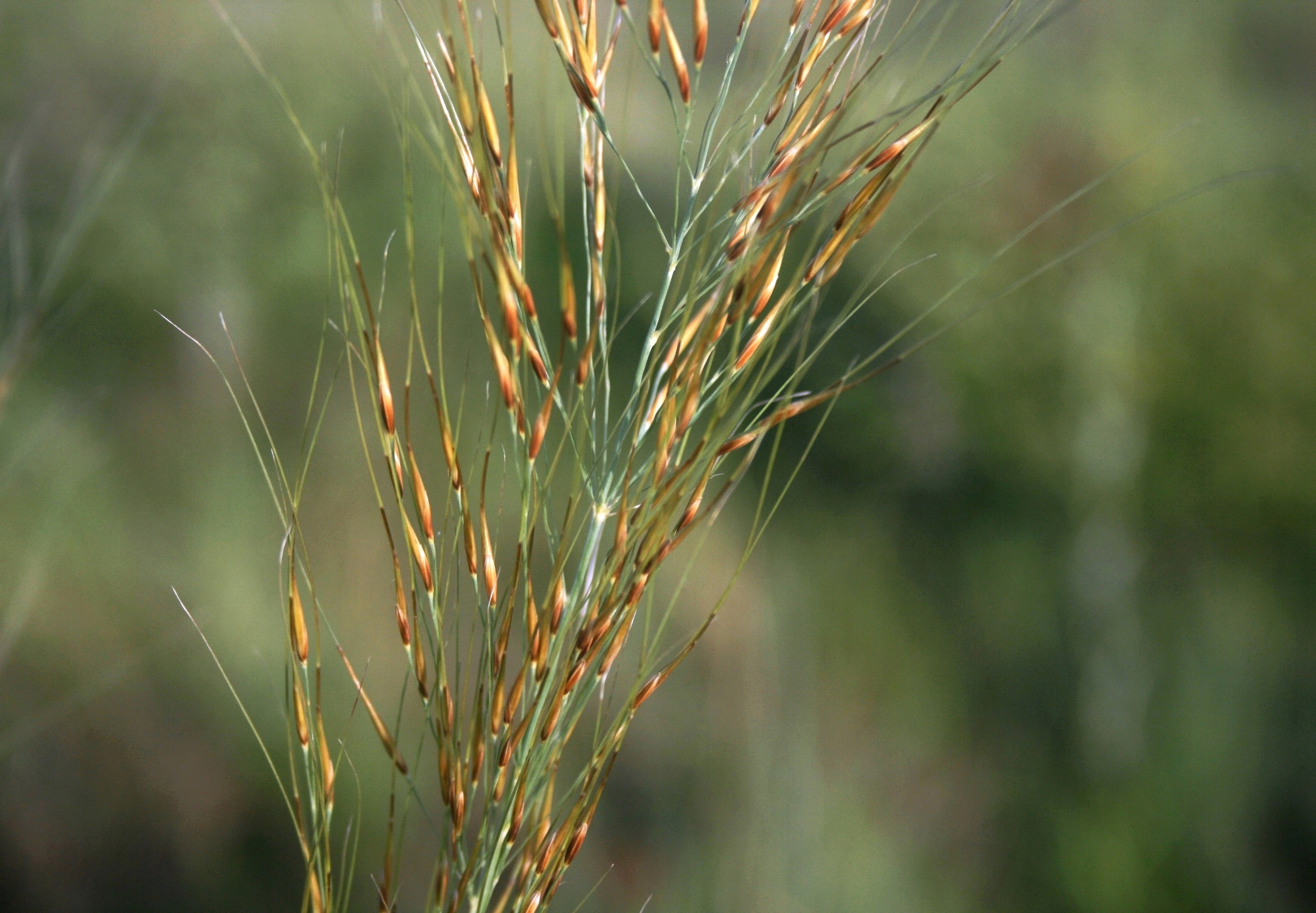
- inflorescence

Scientific classification
- Kingdom: Plantae
- Clade: Tracheophytes
- Clade: Angiosperms
- Clade: Monocots
- Clade: Commelinids
- Order: Poales
- Family: Poaceae
- Subfamily: Panicoideae
- Genus: Loudetia
- Species: L. simplex

Binomial name
- Loudetia simplex (Nees) C.E.Hubb.

Synonyms
- Arundinella simplex (Nees) Roberty; Loudetia elegans Hochst.; Loudetia elegans Hochst. ex A. Braun; Trichopteryx elegans (Hochst.) Hack.; Trichopteryx elegans var. subulifolia Franch.; Trichopteryx gracilis Peter; Trichopteryx incompta Franch.; Trichopteryx simplex (Nees) Hack.; Trichopteryx simplex var. gracilis Rendle; Tristachya elegans (Hochst. ex A. Braun) A. Rich.; Tristachya simplex Nees

= Loudetia simplex =

Species of grass

Loudetia simplex is a grass species found in tropical and Southern Africa and Madagascar. It was originally described as a Tristachya species by Christian Gottfried Daniel Nees von Esenbeck in 1841 and was transferred to Loudetia by Charles Edward Hubbard in 1934.

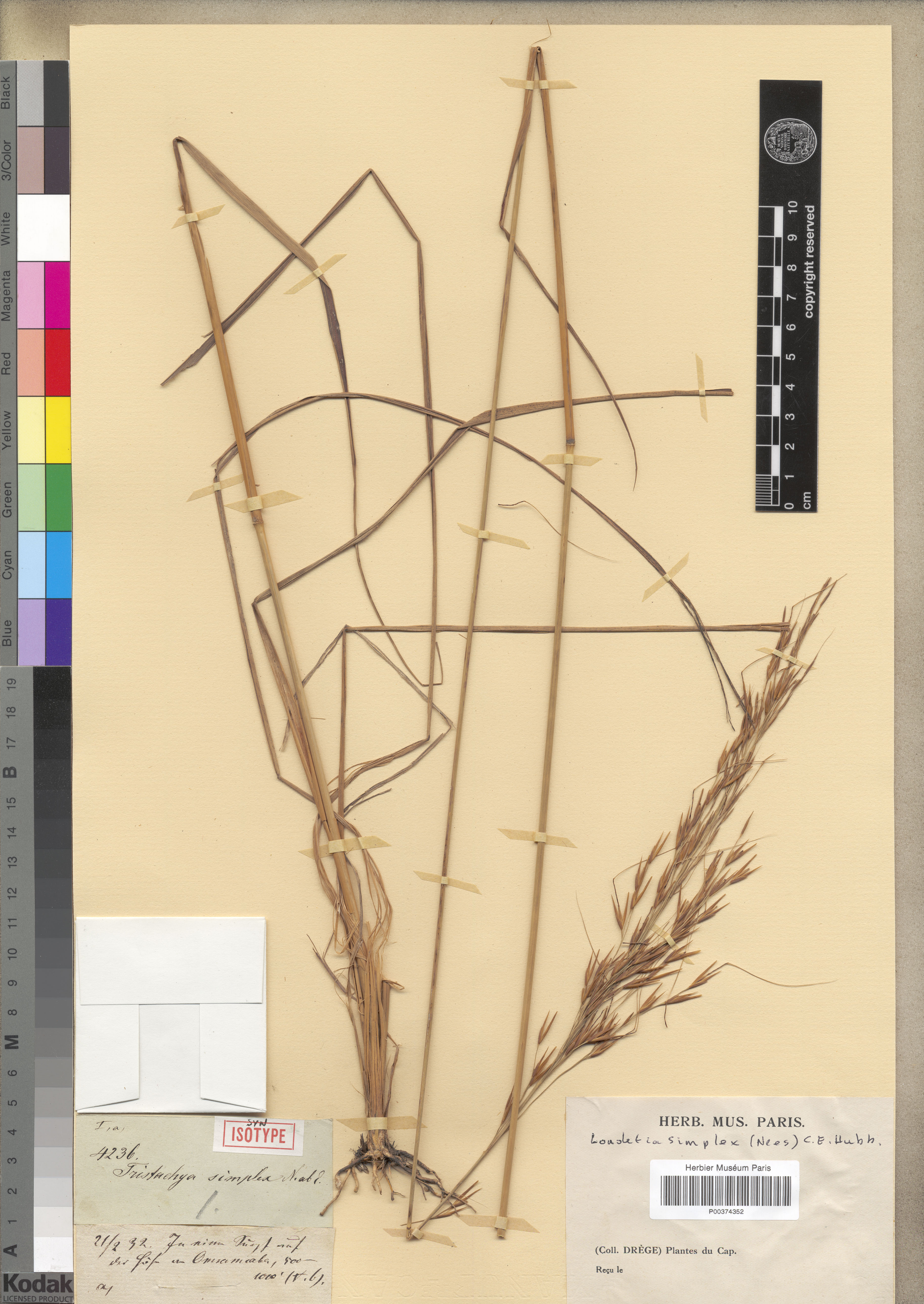
Type specimen at MNHN

The species is a perennial bunch grass, with culms erect and 30–150 cm (12–59 in) long. Leaves are mostly basal, with flat, convolute blades 10–30 cm (3.9–11.8 in) long and 2–5 mm wide. The inflorescence is a 10–30 cm (3.9–11.8 in) long panicle of spikelets, each containing one sterile and one fertile flower. The lemma carries a 25–50 mm long awn.

Like all Loudetia species, L. simplex uses C_{4} photosynthesis and occurs in open habitats, often on poor shallow soils. It is a significant weed species.

Two subspecies have been described:

- Loudetia simplex subsp. simplex
- Loudetia simplex subsp. stipoides

In Madagascar, it is one of the dominant grassland species in the central high plateaus, where it occurs on leached, poorly drained soils and is quite fire-resistant. In Malagasy, it is known locally as horona, horo, berambo, kilailay, kirodrotra, or felika. It has only medium value as pasture grass.
