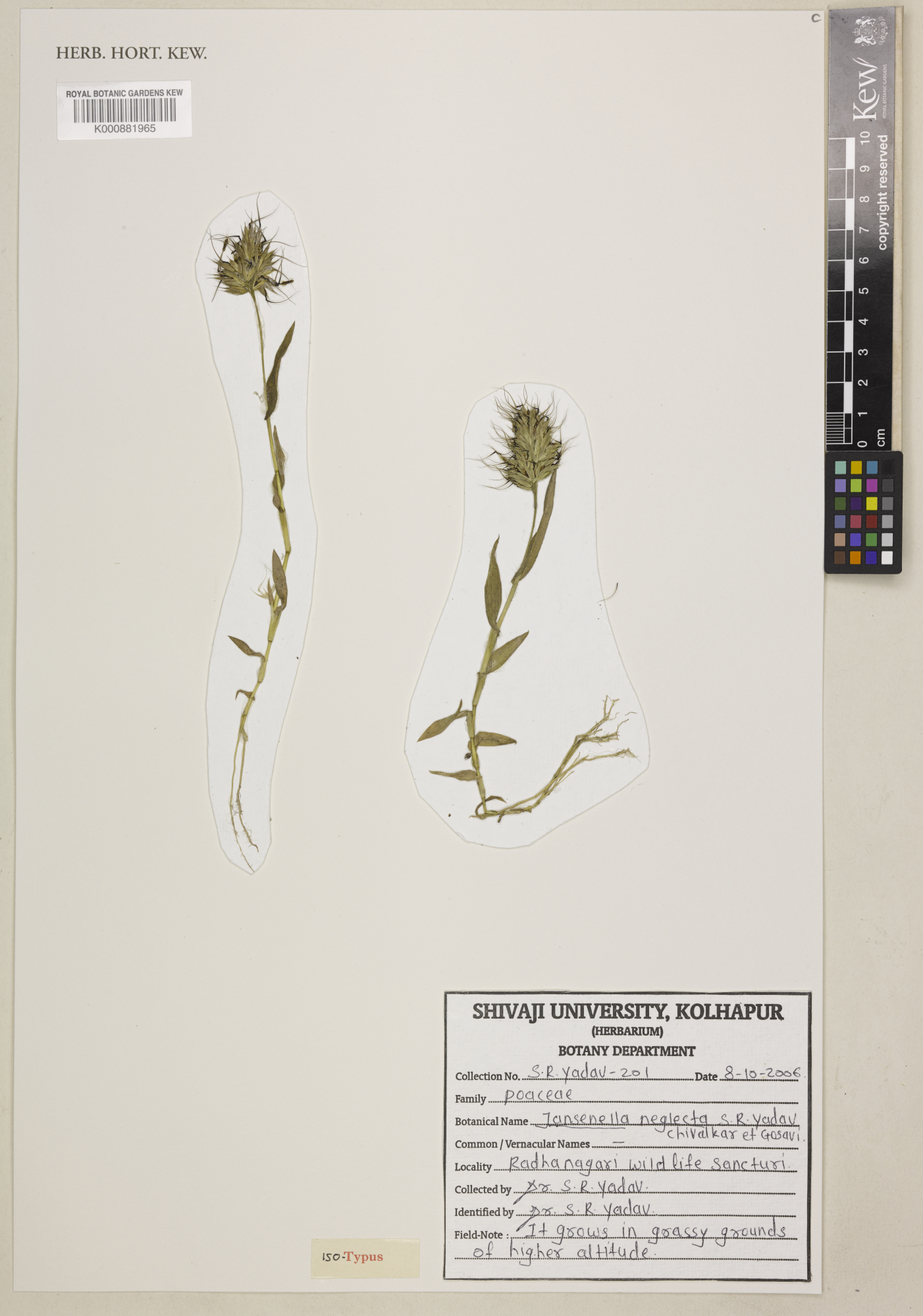

Scientific classification
- Kingdom: Plantae
- Clade: Tracheophytes
- Clade: Angiosperms
- Clade: Monocots
- Clade: Commelinids
- Order: Poales
- Family: Poaceae
- Subfamily: Panicoideae
- Supertribe: Andropogonodae
- Tribe: Arundinelleae
- Genus: Jansenella; Bor

Type species
- Jansenella griffithiana Bor

= Jansenella =

Genus of grasses

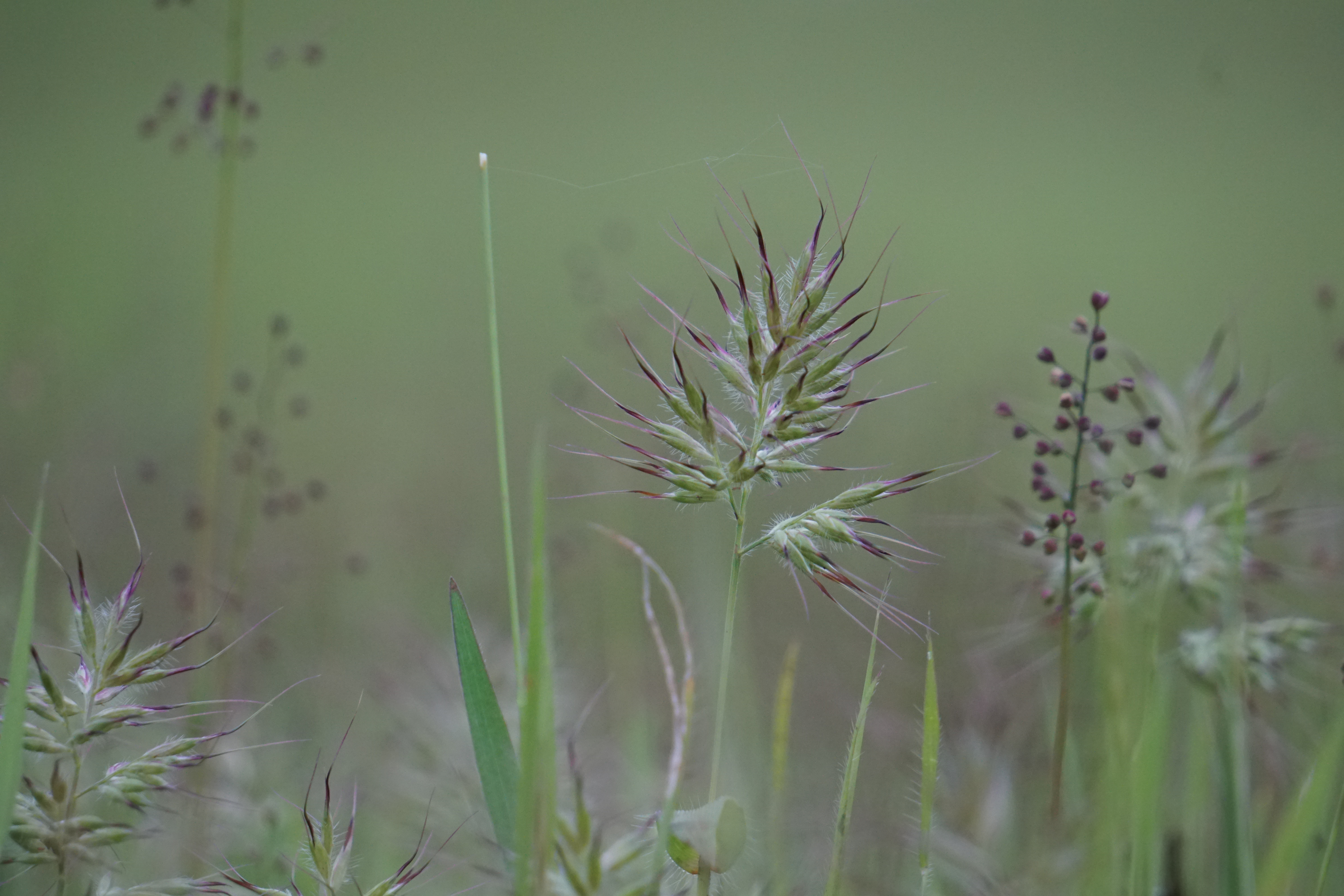
Jansenella griffithiana (C. Muell.) Bor, inflorescence.

Jansenella is a genus of Asian plants in the grass family.

Species

- Jansenella griffithiana (C.Muell.) Bor - India, Sri Lanka, Myanmar
- Jansenella neglecta S.R.Yadav, Chivalkar & Gosavi - Maharashtra
