= Phaenospermateae =

Scientific classification
- Kingdom: Plantae
- Clade: Tracheophytes
- Clade: Angiosperms
- Clade: Monocots
- Clade: Commelinids
- Order: Poales
- Family: Poaceae
- Clade: BOP clade
- Subfamily: Pooideae
- Tribe: Phaenospermateae; Renvoize & Clayton (1985)

Genera
- Phaenosperma

Tribe of grasses

Phaenospermateae is a tribe of grasses, subfamily Pooideae, containing a single genus, Phaenosperma. The tribe previously included several other genera, which are now placed in a separate tribe, Duthieeae.
