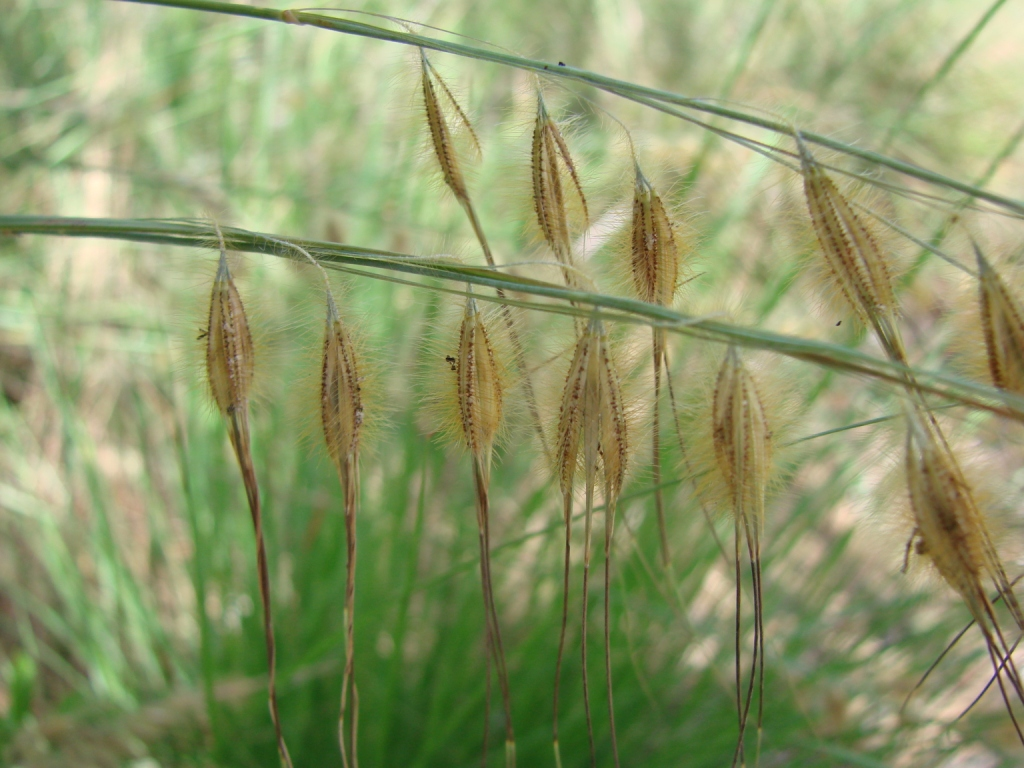
- Loudetiopsis chrysothrix

Scientific classification
- Kingdom: Plantae
- Clade: Tracheophytes
- Clade: Angiosperms
- Clade: Monocots
- Clade: Commelinids
- Order: Poales
- Family: Poaceae
- Subfamily: Panicoideae
- Tribe: Tristachyideae
- Genus: Loudetiopsis; Conert

Type species
- Loudetiopsis ambiens (K.Schum.) Conert

Synonyms
- Diandrostachya (C.E.Hubb.) Jacq.-Fél.; Tristachya sect. Diandrostachya C.E. Hubb.

= Loudetiopsis =

Genus of grasses

Loudetiopsis is a genus of African and South American plants in the grass family.

Species

- Loudetiopsis ambiens - tropical Africa
- Loudetiopsis baldwinii - Guinea
- Loudetiopsis capillipes - Guinea, Ivory Coast, Burkina Faso
- Loudetiopsis chevalieri - Chad, Central African Rep
- Loudetiopsis chrysothrix - Brazil, Bolivia, western Africa
- Loudetiopsis falcipes - Liberia
- Loudetiopsis glabrata - tropical Africa
- Loudetiopsis kerstingii - tropical Africa
- Loudetiopsis scaettae - tropical Africa
- Loudetiopsis thoroldii - tropical Africa
- Loudetiopsis trigemina - Nigeria, Cameroon

formerly included

see Dilophotriche

- Loudetiopsis occidentalis - Dilophotriche occidentalis
- Loudetiopsis pobeguinii - Dilophotriche pobeguinii
- Loudetiopsis purpurea - Dilophotriche tristachyoides
- Loudetiopsis tristachyoides - Dilophotriche tristachyoides
