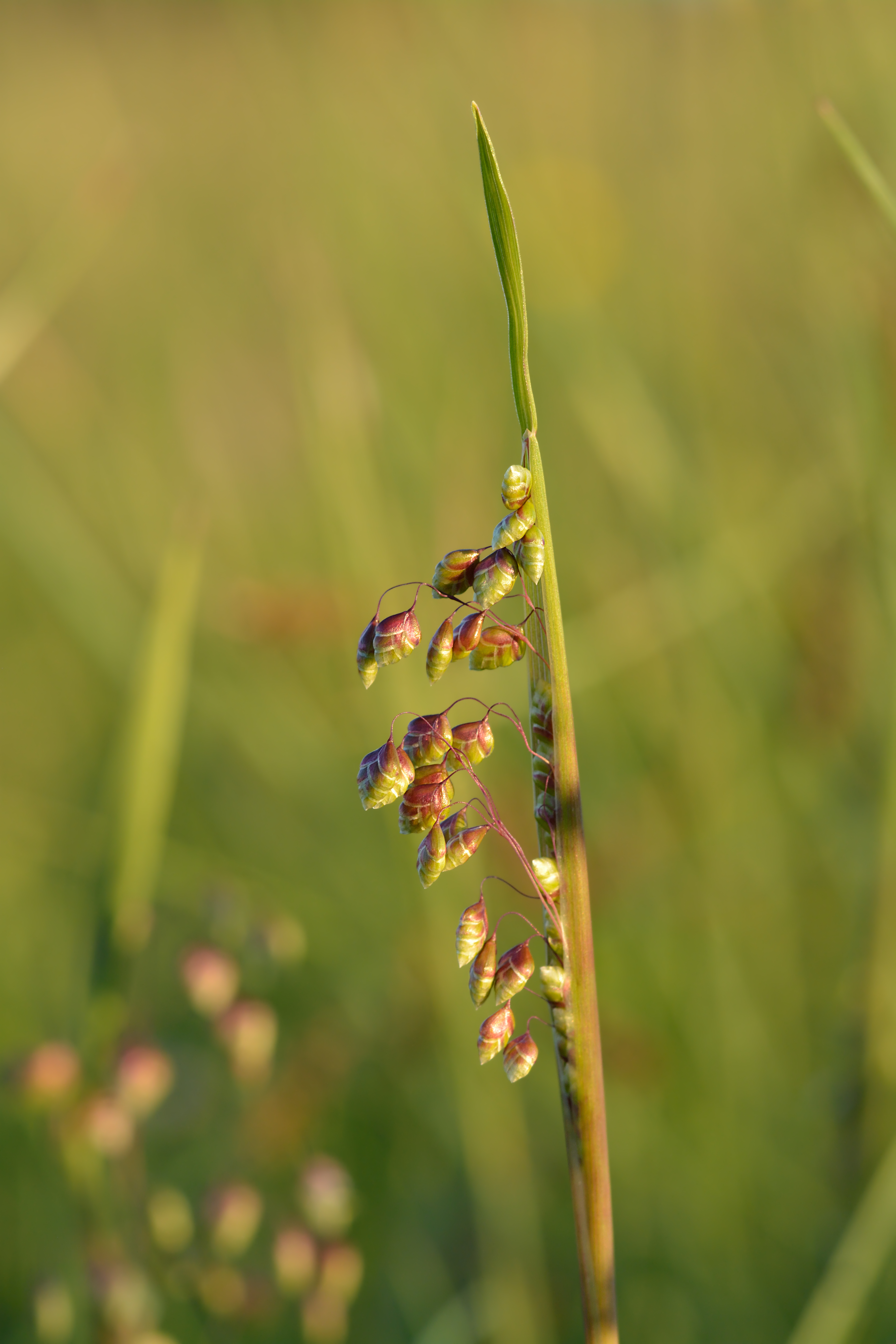
- Quaking grass (Briza media)

Scientific classification
- Kingdom: Plantae
- Clade: Tracheophytes
- Clade: Angiosperms
- Clade: Monocots
- Clade: Commelinids
- Order: Poales
- Family: Poaceae
- Clade: BOP clade
- Subfamily: Pooideae; Benth.

Subdivisions
- See text.

= Pooideae =

Subfamily of plants

The Pooideae are the largest subfamily of the grass family Poaceae, with about 4,000 species in 15 tribes and roughly 200 genera. They include some major cereals such as wheat, barley, oat, rye and many lawn and pasture grasses. They are often referred to as cool-season grasses, because they are distributed in temperate climates. All of them use the C_{3} photosynthetic pathway.

The Pooideae are the sister group of the bamboos within the BOP clade, and are themselves subdivided into 15 tribes.

== Evolutionary history ==
Pooidae started diversifying in the Late Eocene, and their radiation was especially intense during the Oligocene and Miocene epochs.

== Phylogeny ==
Relationships of tribes in the Pooideae according to a 2017 phylogenetic classification, also showing the bamboos as sister group:

- bamboos (Bambusoideae)
- Pooideae
  - Brachyelytreae
  - - Nardodae
      - Lygeeae
      - Nardeae
    - - - Duthieeae
        - Phaenospermateae
      - - Melicodae
          - Brylkinieae
          - Meliceae
        - - Stipodae
            - Stipeae
            - Ampelodesmeae
          - - Diarrheneae
            - "core Pooideae"
              - Brachypodieae
              - - Triticodae
                  - Littledaleae
                  - - Bromeae
                    - Triticeae
                - Poodae
                  - Poeae
                    - chloroplast group 1 (Aveninae type)
                      - Torreyochloinae
                      - - - Phalaridinae
                          - - Anthoxanthinae
                            - Aveninae
                        - Agrostidinae
                          - Brizinae
                          - - Echinopogoninae
                            - - Agrostideae
                              - Calothecinae
                    - chloroplast group 2 (Poinae type)
                      - - Coleanthinae
                        - Poodinae
                          - Miliinae
                          - - Poinae
                            - - Phleinae
                              - - Beckmanniinae
                                - - Cinninae
                                  - - Alopecurinae
                                    - Ventenatinae
                      - - Sesleriinae
                        - - Holcinae
                          - - Scolochloinae
                            - - Airinae
                              - - Aristaveninae
                                - Loliodinae
                                  - Loliinae
                                  - - Dactylidinae
                                    - - Cynosurinae
                                      - - Parapholiinae
                                        - Ammochloinae
