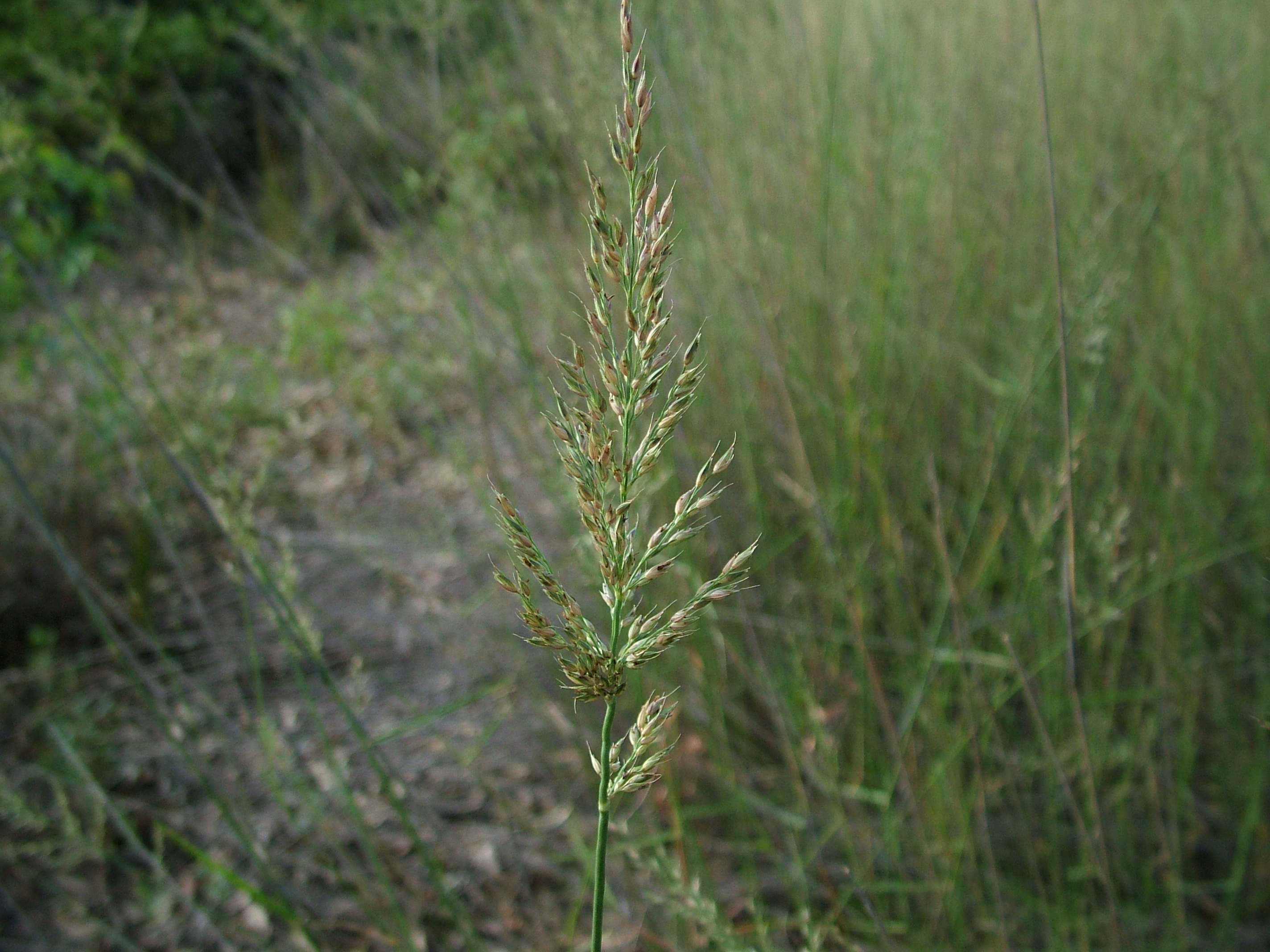
- Arundinella nepalensis

Scientific classification
- Kingdom: Plantae
- Clade: Embryophytes
- Clade: Tracheophytes
- Clade: Spermatophytes
- Clade: Angiosperms
- Clade: Monocots
- Clade: Commelinids
- Order: Poales
- Family: Poaceae
- Clade: PACMAD clade
- Subfamily: Panicoideae
- Supertribe: Andropogonodae
- Tribe: Arundinelleae; Stapf (1898)

Genera
- Arundinella; Garnotia

Synonyms
- Garnotieae Tateoka (1957); Arundinellinae Honda (1930); Garnotiinae Pilg. (1956)

= Arundinelleae =

Tribe of grasses

Arundinelleae is a tribe of grasses with two genera, mainly distributed in tropical and subtropical areas. The tribe's sister group are the Andropogoneae, with which they are classified in supertribe Andropogonodae. All species in this tribe use C_{4} carbon fixation.
