= Dilophotriche =

Scientific classification
- Kingdom: Plantae
- Clade: Tracheophytes
- Clade: Angiosperms
- Clade: Monocots
- Clade: Commelinids
- Order: Poales
- Family: Poaceae
- Subfamily: Panicoideae
- Tribe: Tristachyideae
- Genus: Dilophotriche (C.E.Hubb.) Jacq.-Fél.

Type species
- Tristachya tristachyoides (Trin.) C.E. Hubb.

Synonyms
- Tristachya sect. Dilophotriche C.E. Hubb.

Genus of grasses

Dilophotriche is a genus of West African plants in the grass family.

Species

- Dilophotriche occidentalis Jacq.-Fél. - Guinea
- Dilophotriche pobeguinii Jacq.-Fél. - Guinea, Guinea-Bissau, Senegal, Burkina Faso
- Dilophotriche tristachyoides (Trin.) Jacq.-Fél. - Guinea, Guinea-Bissau, Senegal, Mali, Sierra Leone
