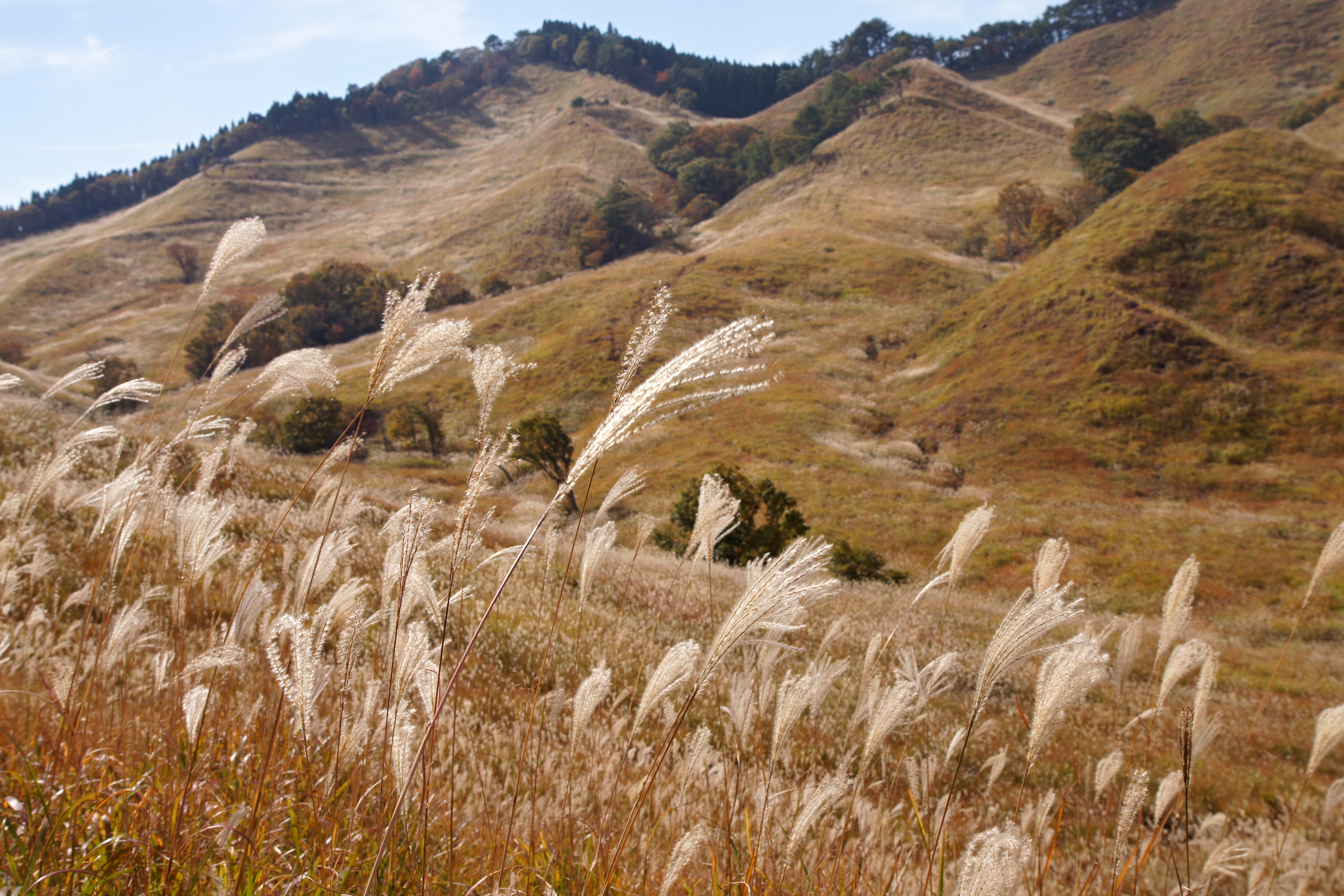
- Miscanthus sinensis in Tonomine Highlands, Japan

Scientific classification
- Kingdom: Plantae
- Clade: Tracheophytes
- Clade: Angiosperms
- Clade: Monocots
- Clade: Commelinids
- Order: Poales
- Family: Poaceae
- Clade: PACMAD clade
- Subfamily: Panicoideae; A.Braun (1864)

Tribes
- 12 tribes, see text

Synonyms
- Andropogonoideae Rouy (1913); Centothecoideae Soderst. (1981); Andropogineae Burmeist. (1837, unranked); Paniceae Burmeist. (1837, unranked); Paniceae Link (1827, unranked); Rottboëllaceae Burmeist. (1837, unranked)

= Panicoideae =

Subfamily of plants

Panicoideae is the second-largest subfamily of the grasses with over 3,500 species, mainly distributed in warm temperate and tropical regions. It comprises some important agricultural crops, including sugarcane, maize (or corn), millet, sorghum, and switchgrass.

C_{4} photosynthesis evolved independently a number of times in the subfamily, which presumably had a C_{3} ancestor.

== Description ==
The ligule has a fringe of hairs. The inflorescence is branched around a common axis. The spikelets are all alike with two bisexual florets that are joined below the glumes (the outer floral envelopes). The lower glume is shorter than the spikelet.

== Systematics and taxonomy ==
Within the PACMAD clade of grasses, the Panicoideae are sister to a clade made of the four subfamilies Arundinoideae, Chloridoideae, Danthonioideae, and Micrairoideae. A modern phylogenetic classification divides the Panicoideae in twelve tribes corresponding to monophyletic clades; two genera, Chandrasekharania and Jansenella, are unplaced (incertae sedis) but probably belong to tribe Tristachyideae. The three largest tribes, Paniceae, Paspaleae, and Andropogoneae, together with the small Arundinelleae, form the core of the subfamily. The Gynerieae were formerly placed in Arundinoideae, and the basal lineage, the "centothecoid clade" with seven tribes, was formerly seen as separate subfamily, Centothecoideae.

Phylogeny based on chloroplast DNA analyses, showing relationships of tribes within the subfamily (dashed lines indicate uncertain positions; C_{4} clades flagged):

- Panicoideae
  - "centothecoid clade"
    - - Chasmanthieae
      - Zeugiteae
    - - - Steyermarkochloeae
        - Tristachyideae C_{4}
      - - Centotheceae
        - - Cyperochloeae
          - Thysanolaeneae
  - - Gynerieae
    - - Paniceae C_{3} & C_{4}
      - - Lecomtelleae
        - Andropogonodae
          - Paspaleae C_{3} & C_{4}
          - - Andropogoneae C_{4}
            - Arundinelleae C_{4}

== Gallery ==
Diversity of Panicoideae

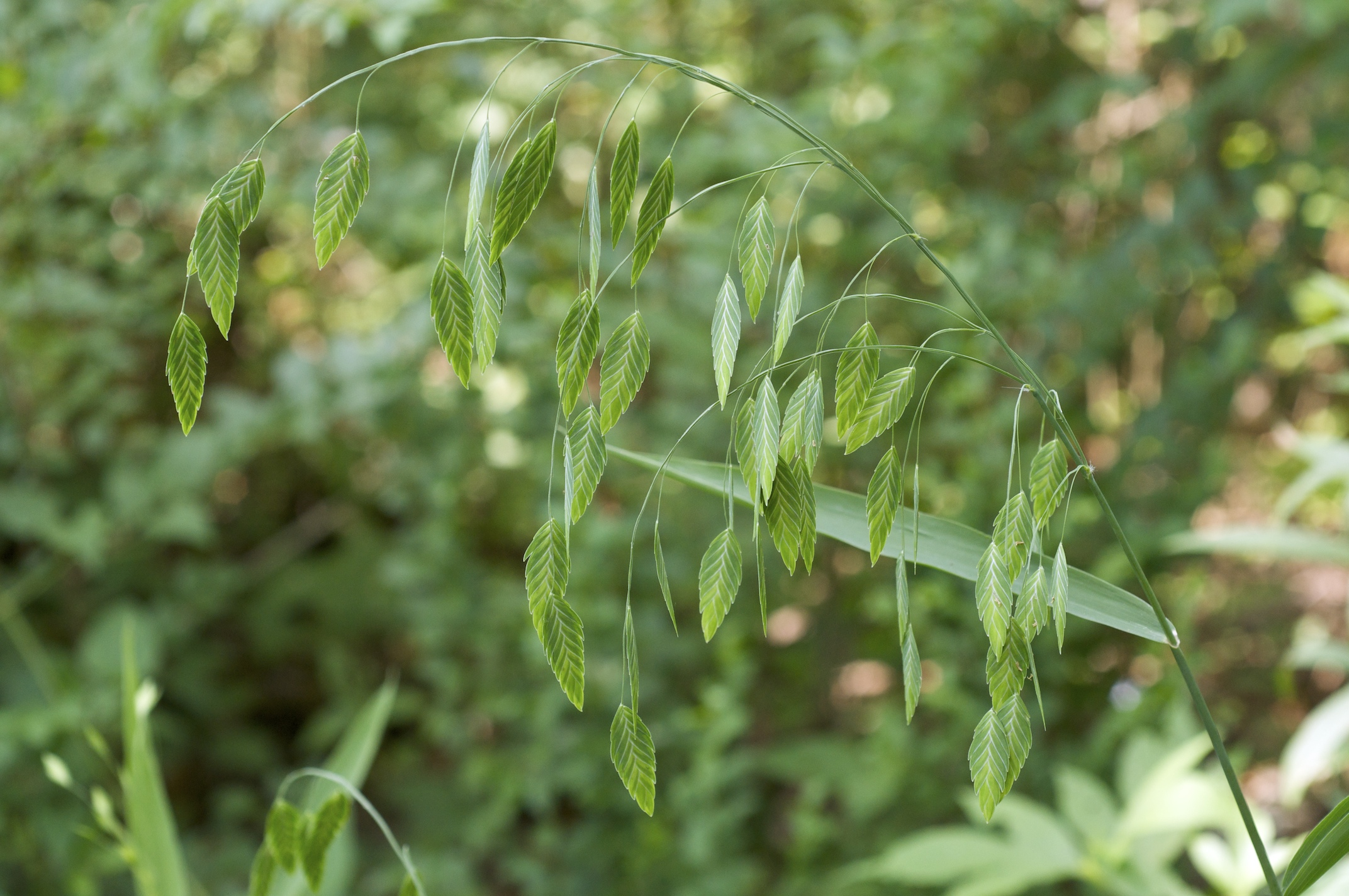
Woodoats (Chasmanthium latifolium, Chasmanthieae)

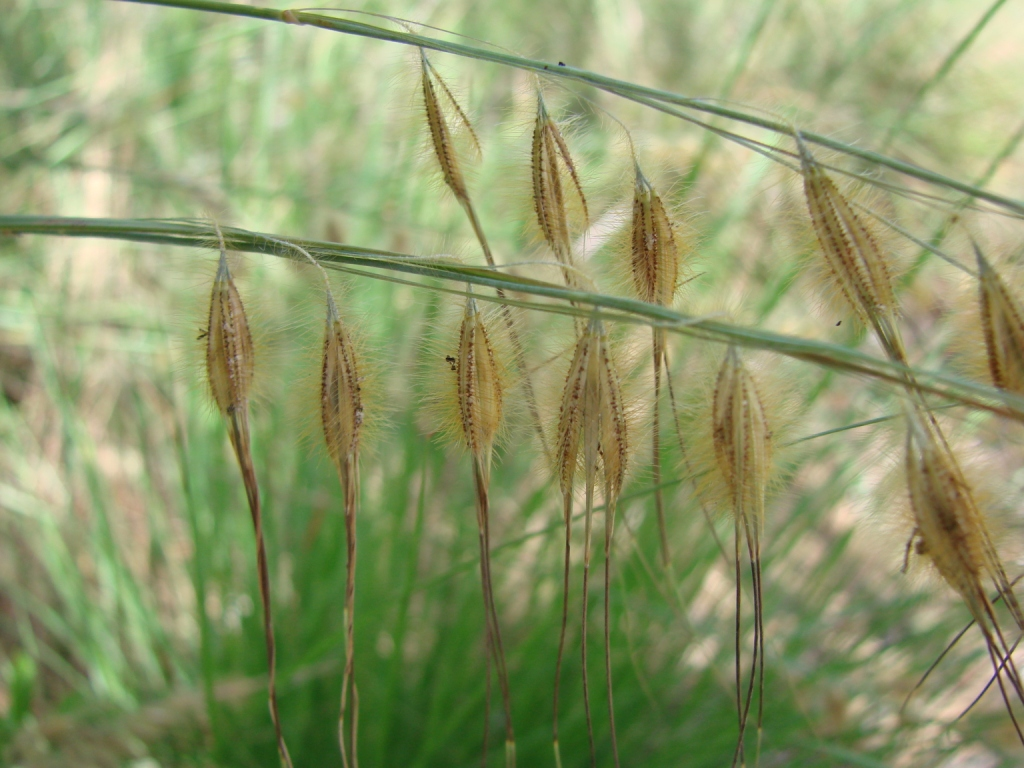
Spikelets of Loudetiopsis chrysothrix (Tristachyideae)

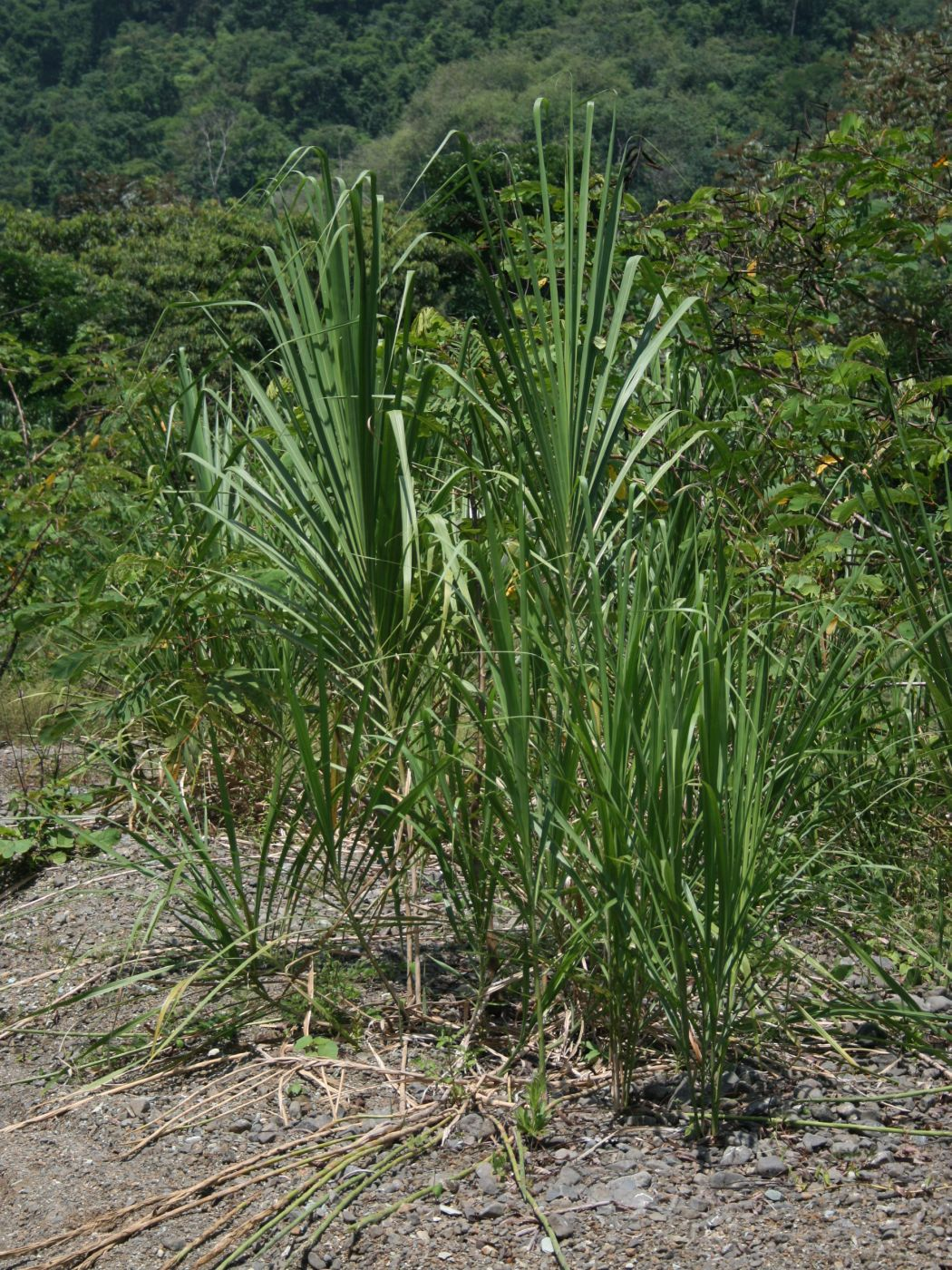
Gynerium sagittatum

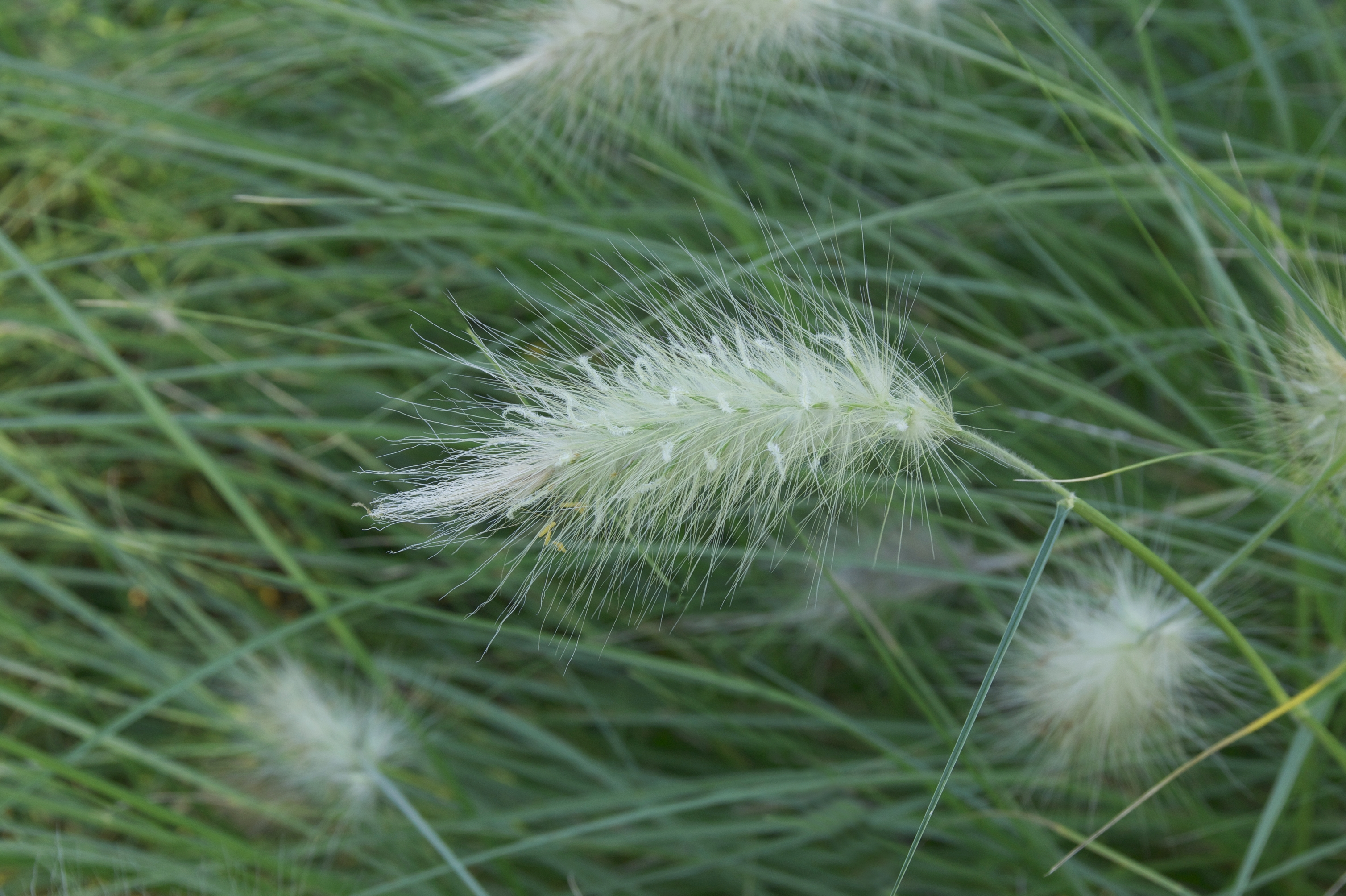
Feathertop grass (Pennisetum villosum, Paniceae)

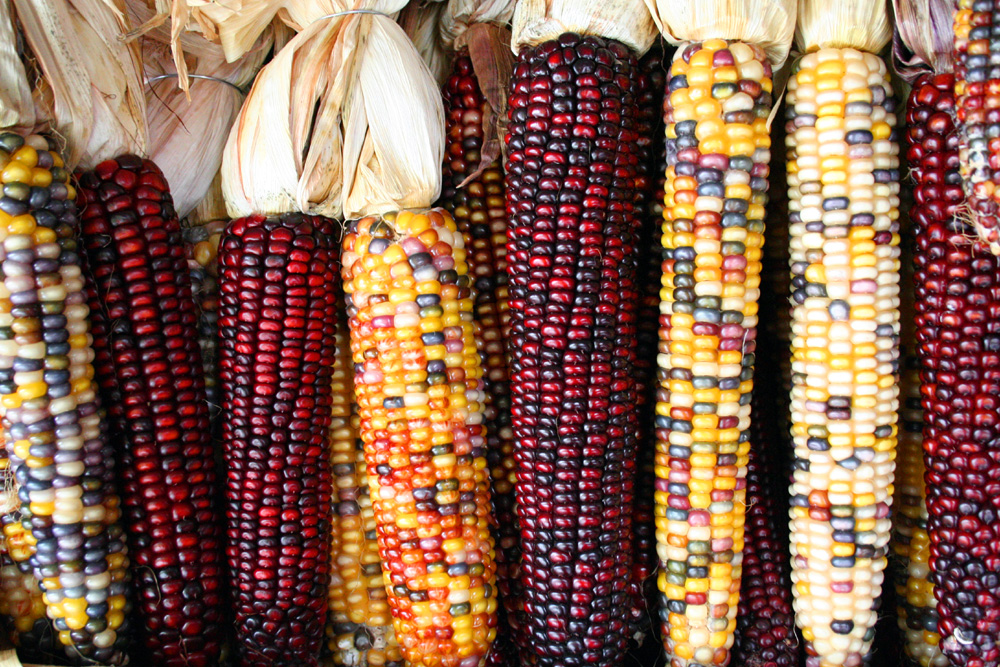
Cultivated maize or corn (Zea mays, Andropogoneae)

== See also ==
- Family Poaceae
- List of Poaceae subfamilies
