= Tascina dalattensis =

Scientific classification
- Domain: Eukaryota
- Kingdom: Animalia
- Phylum: Arthropoda
- Class: Insecta
- Order: Lepidoptera
- Family: Castniidae
- Genus: Tascina
- Species: T. dalattensis

Binomial name
- Tascina dalattensis Fukuda, 2000

Species of moth

Tascina dalattensis is a moth in the Castniidae family. It is found in southern Vietnam.

Fukuda describes T. dalattensis as being "most similar to T. nicevillei, T. metallica", species which are found in Vietnam, Myanmar (Tenasserim) and the Philippines (Palawan island).
