= Haemonides candida =

Scientific classification
- Domain: Eukaryota
- Kingdom: Animalia
- Phylum: Arthropoda
- Class: Insecta
- Order: Lepidoptera
- Family: Castniidae
- Genus: Haemonides
- Species: H. candida

Binomial name
- Haemonides candida (Houlbert, 1917)

Synonyms
- Castnia candida Houlbert, 1917; Haemonides cronis Strand, 1913 (preocc. Cramer, [1775]); Castnia strandi Houlbert, 1917 (preocc. Niepelt, 1914)

Species of moth

Haemonides candida is a moth in the Castniidae family. It is found in Peru and Guyana.

== Subspecies ==
- Haemonides candida candida (Peru)
- Haemonides candida houlbertina Lamas, 1995 (Guyana)
