= Mirocastnia pyrrhopygoides =

Scientific classification
- Domain: Eukaryota
- Kingdom: Animalia
- Phylum: Arthropoda
- Class: Insecta
- Order: Lepidoptera
- Family: Castniidae
- Genus: Mirocastnia
- Species: M. pyrrhopygoides

Binomial name
- Mirocastnia pyrrhopygoides (Houlbert, 1917)

Synonyms
- Castnia pyrrhopygoides Houlbert, 1917; Castnia subcoerulea Rothschild, 1919

Species of moth

Mirocastnia pyrrhopygoides is a moth in the Castniidae family. It is found in Ecuador, Peru and Colombia.

The length of the forewings is 26.6-34.5 mm for males and about 29 mm for females. They mimic Pythonides limaea.
