= Amauta ambatensis =

Scientific classification
- Domain: Eukaryota
- Kingdom: Animalia
- Phylum: Arthropoda
- Class: Insecta
- Order: Lepidoptera
- Family: Castniidae
- Genus: Amauta
- Species: A. ambatensis

Binomial name
- Amauta ambatensis (Houlbert, 1917)

Synonyms
- Castnia ambatensis Houlbert, 1917

Species of moth

Amauta ambatensis is a Neotropical moth in the Castniidae family. It is found in Ecuador.
