= Synpalamides rubrophalaris =

Scientific classification
- Domain: Eukaryota
- Kingdom: Animalia
- Phylum: Arthropoda
- Class: Insecta
- Order: Lepidoptera
- Family: Castniidae
- Genus: Synpalamides
- Species: S. rubrophalaris

Binomial name
- Synpalamides rubrophalaris (Houlbert, 1917)

Synonyms
- Castnia rubrophalaris; Castnia rubrophalaris gristi; Castnia gorgonia; Castnia allyni

Species of moth

Synpalamides rubrophalaris is a moth of the Castniidae family. It is known from Brazil.
