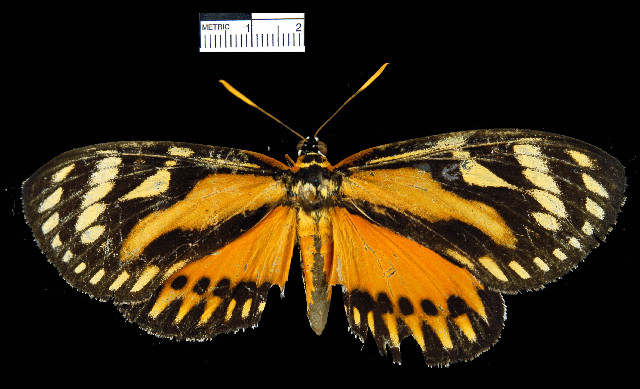
- Dorsal view
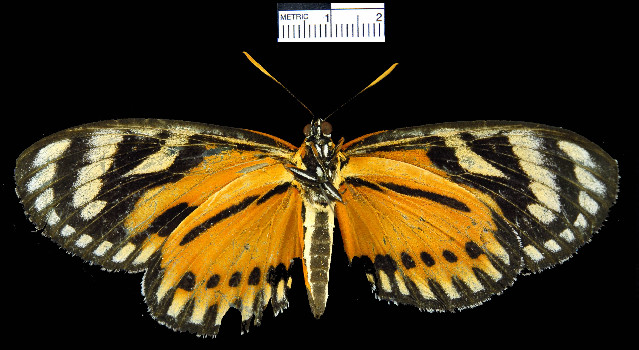
- Ventral view

Scientific classification
- Kingdom: Animalia
- Phylum: Arthropoda
- Class: Insecta
- Order: Lepidoptera
- Family: Castniidae
- Genus: Zegara
- Species: Z. zagraea

Binomial name
- Zegara zagraea (Felder, 1874)

Synonyms
- Castnia zagraea Felder, 1874; Gazera columbina Boisduval, [1875]; Castnia cycna Westwood, 1877; Castnia cycna var. minor Westwood, 1877; Doubldaya zagraeus Buchecker, [1876]; Gazera zagraeoides Houlbert, 1917; Castnia salvina Westwood, 1877; Castnia carilla Schaus, 1911; Castnia (Doubledaya) columbina panamensis Talbot, 1929

= Zegara zagraea =

Species of moth

Zegara zagraea is a moth of the Castniidae family. It is found in Central America and northern South America.

The larvae possibly feed on Aechmea magdalenae.

== Subspecies ==
- Zegara zagraea zagraea (Panama, Colombia)
- Zegara zagraea salvina (Westwood, 1877) (Panama, Costa Rica)
