= Castnius asteropoides =

Scientific classification
- Kingdom: Animalia
- Phylum: Arthropoda
- Class: Insecta
- Order: Lepidoptera
- Family: Castniidae
- Genus: Castnius
- Species: C. asteropoides

Binomial name
- Castnius asteropoides Porion, 2004

Species of moth

Castnius asteropoides is a moth in the Castniidae family. It is endemic to Peru.
