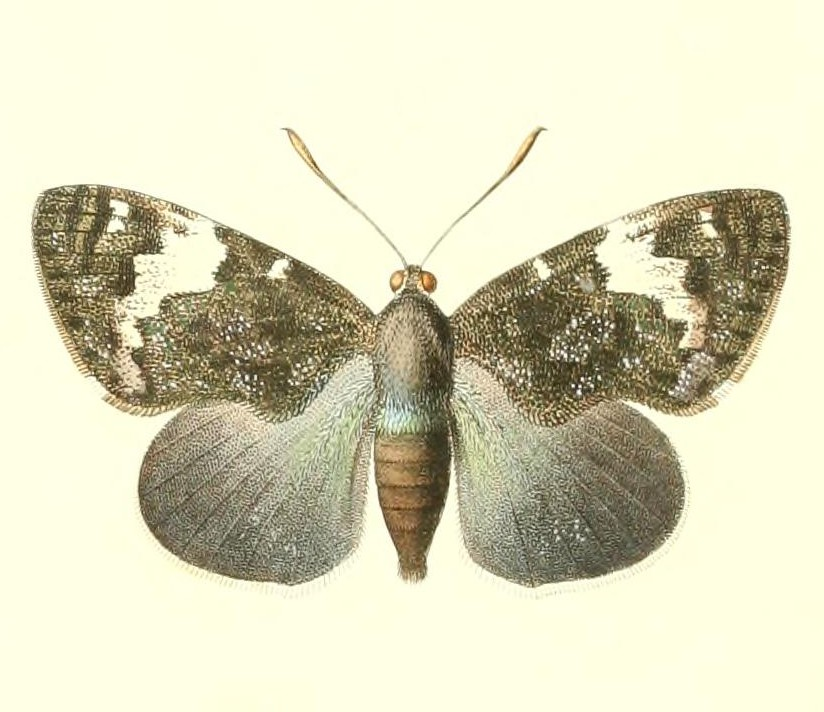

Scientific classification
- Domain: Eukaryota
- Kingdom: Animalia
- Phylum: Arthropoda
- Class: Insecta
- Order: Lepidoptera
- Family: Castniidae
- Genus: Feschaeria
- Species: F. meditrina

Binomial name
- Feschaeria meditrina (Hopffer, 1856)

Synonyms
- Castnia meditrina Hopffer, 1856; Castnia amycus f. tristicula (Strand, 1913); Castnia amycus f. alboinsignita (Strand, 1913)

= Feschaeria meditrina =

Species of moth

Feschaeria meditrina is a species of moth in the family Castniidae. It was described by Carl Heinrich Hopffer in 1856 as Castnia meditrina and can be found in Brazil (Espírito Santo, Rio de Janeiro, and Santa Catarina).
