= Yagra fonscolombe =

Scientific classification
- Domain: Eukaryota
- Kingdom: Animalia
- Phylum: Arthropoda
- Class: Insecta
- Order: Lepidoptera
- Family: Castniidae
- Genus: Yagra
- Species: Y. fonscolombe

Binomial name
- Yagra fonscolombe (Godart, [1824])

Synonyms
- Castnia fonscolombe Godart, [1824]; Athis jäpyx Hübner, [1825]; Castnia kirstenii Thon, 1829; Castnia walkeri Strand, 1913 (nom. nud.)

Species of moth

Yagra fonscolombe is a moth in the Castniidae family. It is found in Brazil.
