= Haemonides cronida =

Scientific classification
- Domain: Eukaryota
- Kingdom: Animalia
- Phylum: Arthropoda
- Class: Insecta
- Order: Lepidoptera
- Family: Castniidae
- Genus: Haemonides
- Species: H. cronida

Binomial name
- Haemonides cronida (Herrich-Schäffer, [1854])

Synonyms
- Castnia cronida Herrich-Schäffer, [1854]; Haemonides cronoides Houlbert, 1918 (nom. nud.); Castnia marius Fabricius, 1938

Species of moth

Haemonides cronida is a moth in the Castniidae family. It is found in Peru, Suriname and Venezuela.

== Subspecies ==
- Haemonides cronida cronida (Surinam)
- Haemonides cronida pebana (Houlbert, 1917) (Peru)
