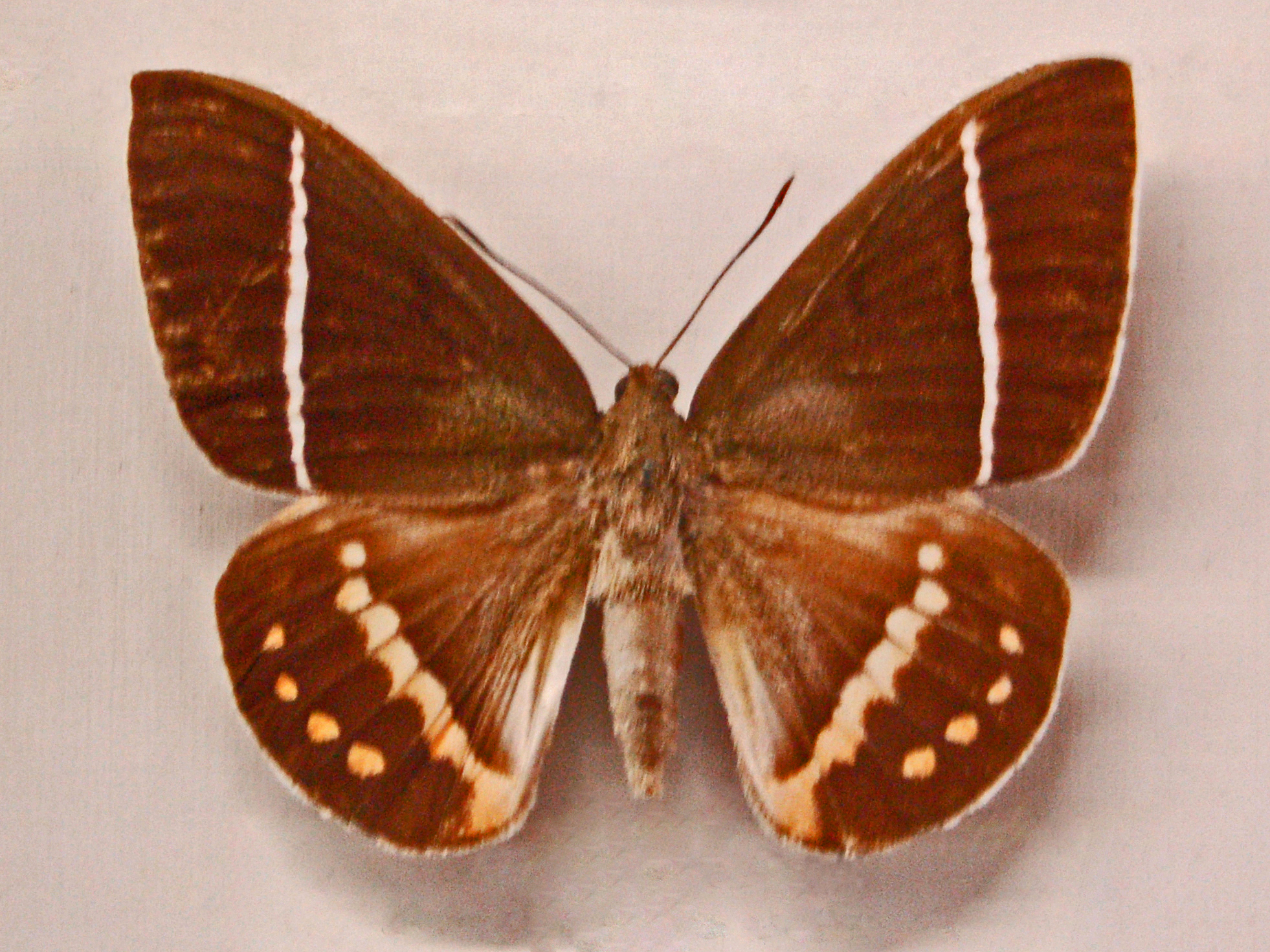
- Amauta cacica

Scientific classification
- Domain: Eukaryota
- Kingdom: Animalia
- Phylum: Arthropoda
- Class: Insecta
- Order: Lepidoptera
- Family: Castniidae
- Genus: Amauta; Houlbert, 1918

= Amauta (moth) =

Genus of moths

Amauta is a genus of moths within the family Castniidae. It was described by Constant Vincent Houlbert in 1918.

== Species ==
- Amauta ambatensis (Houlbert, 1917)
- Amauta cacica (Herrich-Schäffer, [1854])
- Amauta hodeei (Oberthür, 1881)
- Amauta papilionaris (Walker, [1865])
