= Tosxampila annae =

Scientific classification
- Kingdom: Animalia
- Phylum: Arthropoda
- Class: Insecta
- Order: Lepidoptera
- Family: Castniidae
- Genus: Tosxampila
- Species: T. annae

Binomial name
- Tosxampila annae (Biedermann, 1935)

Synonyms
- Castnia annae Biedermann, 1935

Species of moth

Tosxampila annae is a moth in the Castniidae family. It is found in Amazonas, Brazil.
