= Hista hegemon =

Scientific classification
- Domain: Eukaryota
- Kingdom: Animalia
- Phylum: Arthropoda
- Class: Insecta
- Order: Lepidoptera
- Family: Castniidae
- Genus: Hista
- Species: H. hegemon

Binomial name
- Hista hegemon (Kollar, 1839)

Synonyms
- Castnia hegemon Kollar, 1839; Castnia satrapes Buchecker, [1880] (preocc. Kollar, 1839); Castnia menetriesi Boisduval, [1875]; Castnia variegata Rothschild, 1919

Species of moth

Hista hegemon is a moth in the Castniidae family. It is found in south-eastern Brazil.

The length of the forewings is 39 mm for males and 53 mm for females.

== Subspecies ==
- Hista hegemon hegemon (Brazil)
- Hista hegemon menetriesi (Boisduval, [1875]) (Brazil)
- Hista hegemon variegata (Rothschild, 1919) (Brazil: Santa Catarina)

== Etymology ==
The specific epithet is derived from the Greek word hegemon (meaning "leader").
