= Ircila =

Scientific classification
- Kingdom: Animalia
- Phylum: Arthropoda
- Class: Insecta
- Order: Lepidoptera
- Family: Castniidae
- Genus: Ircila; Houlbert, 1918
- Species: I. hecacte

Binomial name
- Ircila hecacte (Herrich-Schäffer, [1854])

Synonyms
- Castnia hecate Herrich-Schäffer, [1854]

Genus of moths

Ircila is a monotypic moth genus in the family Castniidae described by Constant Vincent Houlbert in 1918. Its single species, Ircila hecacte, was first described by Gottlieb August Wilhelm Herrich-Schäffer in 1854. It is endemic to the island of Hispaniola (in the Dominican Republic and Haiti).
