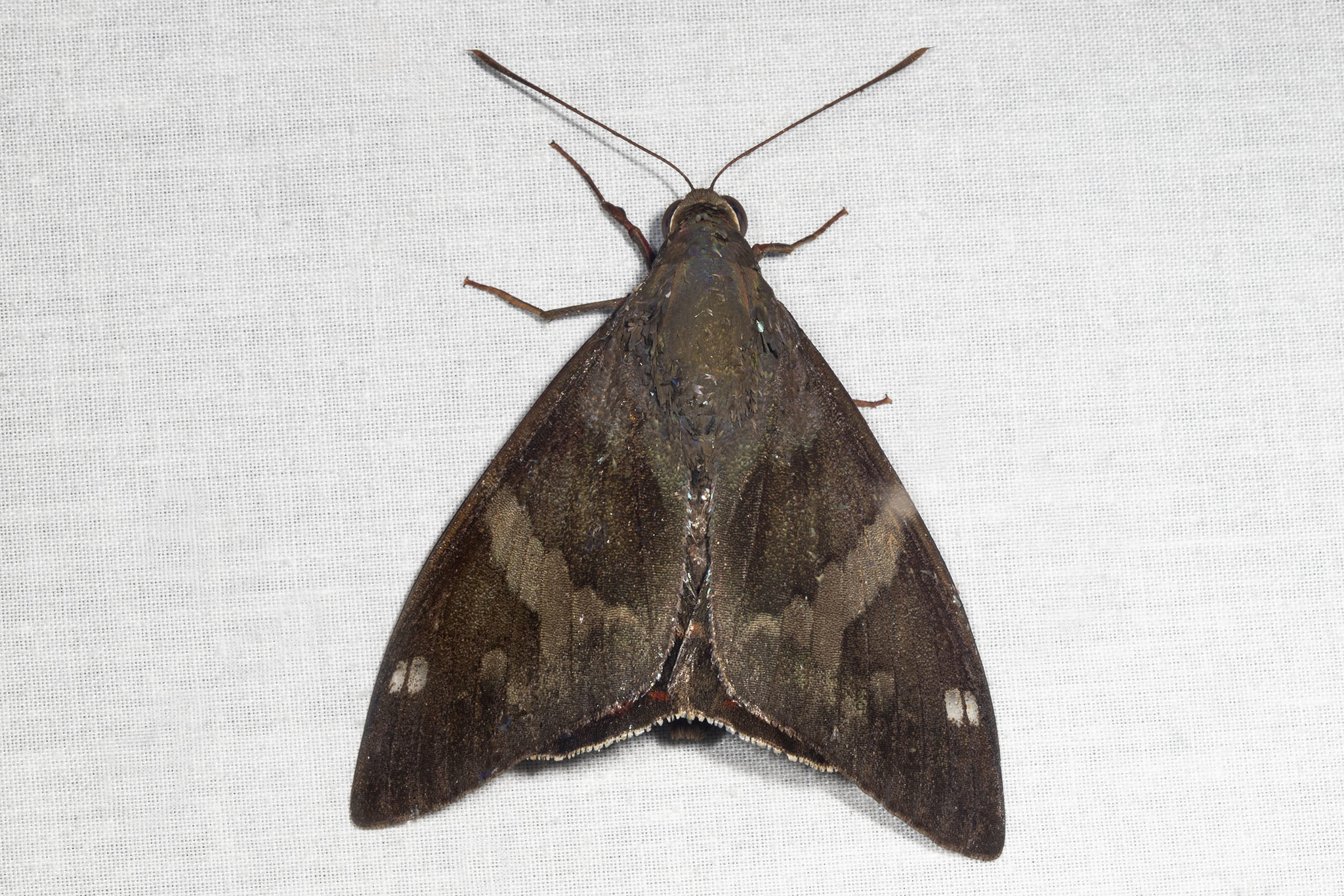

Scientific classification
- Domain: Eukaryota
- Kingdom: Animalia
- Phylum: Arthropoda
- Class: Insecta
- Order: Lepidoptera
- Family: Castniidae
- Genus: Corybantes
- Species: C. mathani

Binomial name
- Corybantes mathani (Oberthür, 1881)

Synonyms
- Castnia mathani Oberthür, 1881; Castnia atrata Röber, 1931

= Corybantes mathani =

Species of moth

Corybantes mathani is a moth in the Castniidae family. It is found in South America, including Venezuela, Guyana and Peru.

The wingspan is 110–115 mm.

== Subspecies ==
- Corybantes mathani mathani (Amazonas)
- Corybantes mathani atrata (Röber, 1931) (Peru)
