= Lapaeumides actor =

Scientific classification
- Kingdom: Animalia
- Phylum: Arthropoda
- Class: Insecta
- Order: Lepidoptera
- Family: Castniidae
- Genus: Lapaeumides
- Species: L. actor

Binomial name
- Lapaeumides actor (Dalman, 1824)

Synonyms
- Castnia actor Dalman, 1824

Species of moth

Lapaeumides actor is a moth in the Castniidae family. It is found in Brazil.
