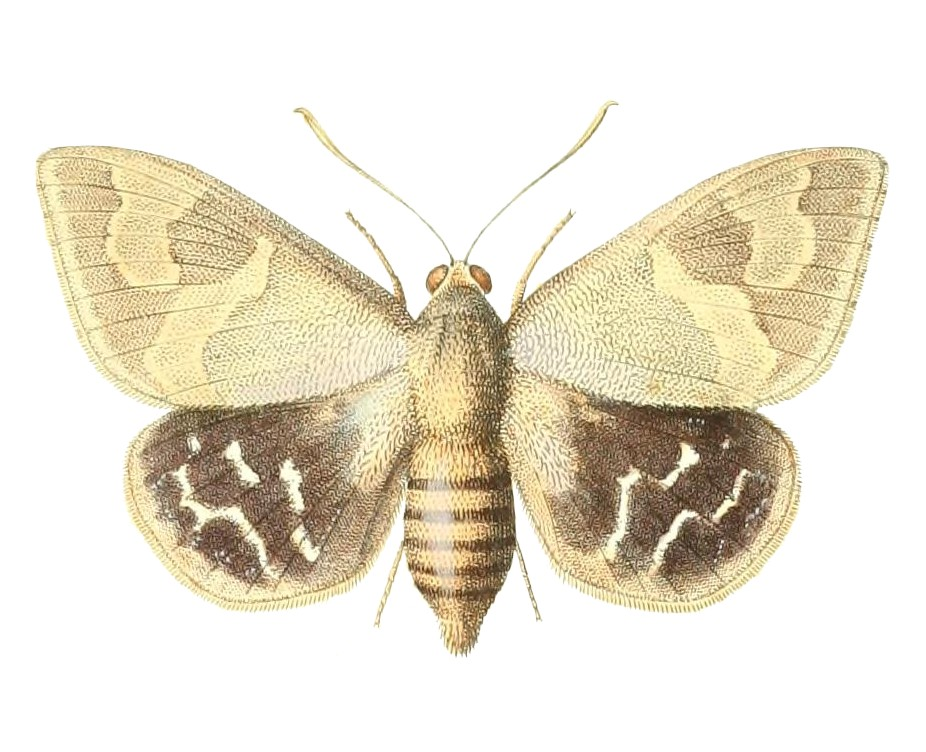
- Synpalamides chelone

Scientific classification
- Kingdom: Animalia
- Phylum: Arthropoda
- Clade: Pancrustacea
- Class: Insecta
- Order: Lepidoptera
- Family: Castniidae
- Genus: Synpalamides; Hübner, [1823]

= Synpalamides =

Genus of moths

Synpalamides is a genus of moths within the Castniidae family.

== Selected species ==
- Synpalamides chelone (Hopffer, 1856)
- Synpalamides escalantei (Miller, 1976)
- Synpalamides orestes (Walker, 1854)
- Synpalamides phalaris (Fabricius, 1793)
- Synpalamides rubrophalaris (Houlbert, 1917)
