= Corybantes pylades =

Scientific classification
- Domain: Eukaryota
- Kingdom: Animalia
- Phylum: Arthropoda
- Class: Insecta
- Order: Lepidoptera
- Family: Castniidae
- Genus: Corybantes
- Species: C. pylades

Binomial name
- Corybantes pylades (Stoll, [1782])

Synonyms
- Papilio pylades Stoll, [1782]

Species of moth

Corybantes pylades is a moth in the Castniidae family. It is found in Suriname, Brazil (Amazonas) and French Guiana.

The wingspan is 160–180 mm. Adults have been recorded in October, March and December.
