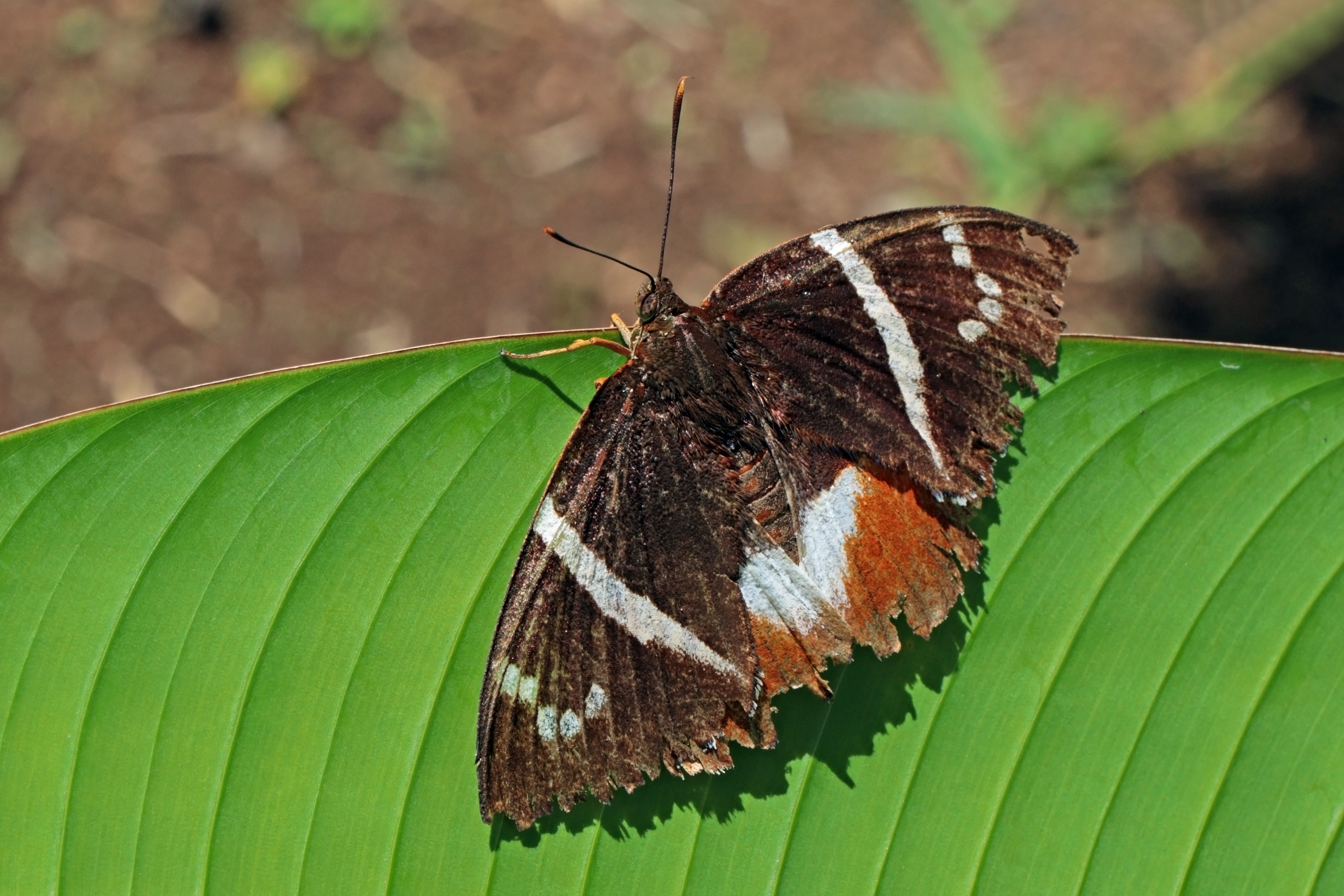
- C. atymnius drucei in Costa Rica

Scientific classification
- Kingdom: Animalia
- Phylum: Arthropoda
- Clade: Pancrustacea
- Class: Insecta
- Order: Lepidoptera
- Family: Castniidae
- Genus: Castniomera; Houlbert, 1918
- Species: C. atymnius

Binomial name
- Castniomera atymnius (Dalman, 1824)

Synonyms
- List: Castnia atymnius Dalman, 1824; Castnia spixii Perty, 1833; Castniomera joiceyi Lathy, 1923; Castnia drucei Schaus, 1911; Castnia ecuadorensis Houlbert, 1917; Castnia futilis Walker, 1856; Castnia salasia Boisduval, [1875]; Castnia humboldti Boisduval, [1875]; Castnia affinis Houlbert, 1917; Castnia newmanni Houlbert, 1917

= Castniomera =

Castniomera atymnius

Genus of moths

Castniomera is a monotypic genus of moths in the family Castniidae described by Constant Vincent Houlbert in 1918. Its single species, Castniomera atymnius, commonly known as the giant butterfly-moth, was first described by Johan Wilhelm Dalman in 1824. It is known from Mexico through Central America to Venezuela.

The larvae feed on Musaceae species.

== Subspecies ==
The following subspecies are recognised:

- Castniomera atymnius atymnius (Dalman, 1824) - eastern Brazil, French Guiana, Colombia
- Castniomera atymnius drucei (Schaus, 1911) - Colombia, Costa Rica
- Castniomera atymnius ecuadorensis (Houlbert, 1917) - Ecuador
- Castniomera atymnius futilis (Walker, 1856) - Nicaragua, Mexico, Honduras, Panama
- Castniomera atymnius humboldti (Boisduval, [1875]) - Colombia
- Castniomera atymnius immaculata (Lathy, 1922) - French Guiana
- Castniomera atymnius newmanni (Houlbert, 1917) - Panama to Colombia, Venezuela
