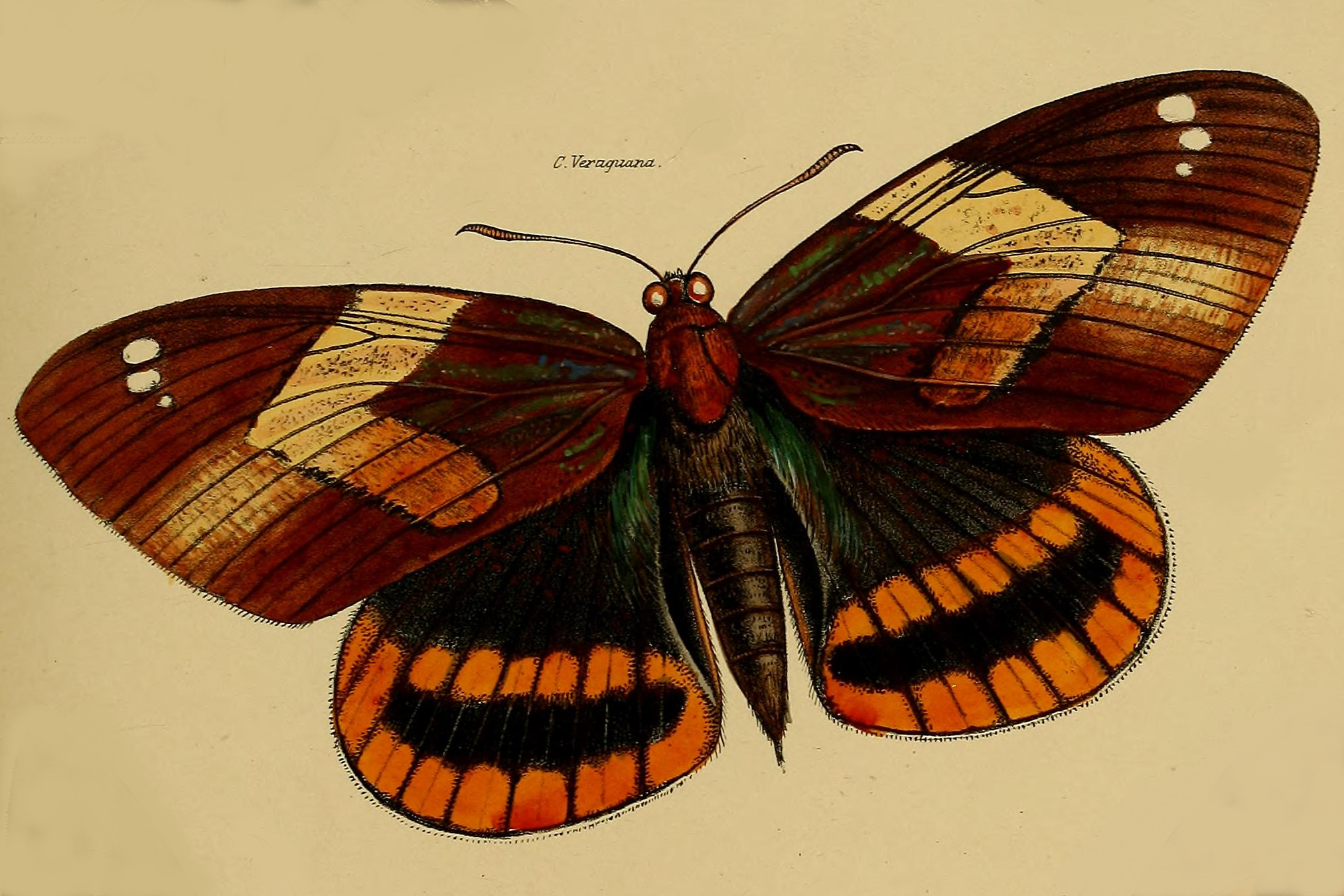
- Mounted specimen illustrated in the original description

Scientific classification
- Kingdom: Animalia
- Phylum: Arthropoda
- Class: Insecta
- Order: Lepidoptera
- Family: Castniidae
- Genus: Corybantes
- Species: C. veraguana

Binomial name
- Corybantes veraguana (Westwood, 1877)

Synonyms
- Castnia veraguana Westwood, 1877; Castnia govara Schaus, 1896; Castnia parambae Rothschild, 1919

= Corybantes veraguana =

Species of moth

Corybantes veraguana is a moth in the Castniidae family. It is found in Panama, Colombia and Ecuador.

== Subspecies ==
- Corybantes veraguana veraguana (Panama)
- Corybantes veraguana govara (Schaus, 1896) (Colombia)
- Corybantes veraguana parambae (Rothschild, 1919) (Ecuador)
