= Zegara personata =

Scientific classification
- Kingdom: Animalia
- Phylum: Arthropoda
- Class: Insecta
- Order: Lepidoptera
- Family: Castniidae
- Genus: Zegara
- Species: Z. personata

Binomial name
- Zegara personata (Walker, [1865])

Synonyms
- Gazera personata Walker, [1865]; Castnia linoides Strand, 1913; Castnia halli Joicey & Talbot, 1925; Castnia daguana Preiss, 1899; Castnia gephyra Hering, 1923; Castnia gephyra leucozona Hopp, 1925; Castnia dimorpha Röber, 1927; Castnia daguana fuliginea Talbot, 1929; Castnia juanita Preiss, 1899

Species of moth

Zegara personata is a moth in the Castniidae family. It is found in Colombia and Ecuador.

== Subspecies ==
- Zegara personata personata (Ecuador)
- Zegara personata daguana (Preiss, 1899) (Colombia)
- Zegara personata juanita (Preiss, 1899) (Colombia)
