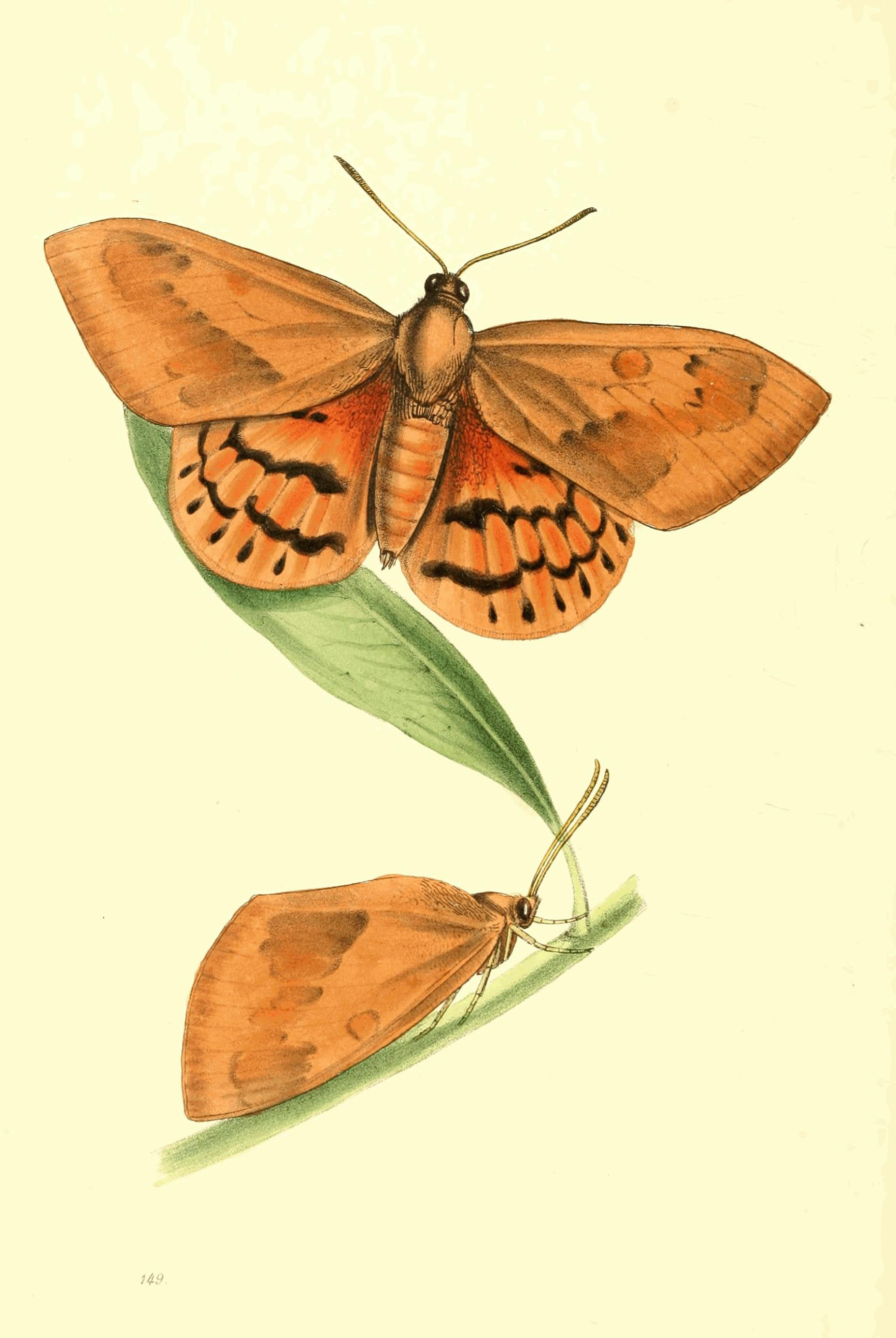

Scientific classification
- Domain: Eukaryota
- Kingdom: Animalia
- Phylum: Arthropoda
- Class: Insecta
- Order: Lepidoptera
- Family: Castniidae
- Genus: Hista
- Species: H. fabricii

Binomial name
- Hista fabricii (Swainson, 1823)

Synonyms
- Castnia fabricii Swainson, 1823; Castnia boisduvalii Walker, 1854; Castnia herrichii Herrich-Schäffer, [1854]; Castnia ciela Herrich-Schäffer, [1855]; Castnia besckei Ménétriés, 1857; Castnia boisduvali Schaufuss, 1870 (not Walker, 1854); Castnia papagaya Westwood, 1877; Castnia papagaya f. grandensis Strand, 1913; Castnia similis Röber, 1927; Castnia boisduvali f. interrupta Spitz, 1930

= Hista fabricii =

Species of moth

Hista fabricii is a moth in the Castniidae family. It is found in Brazil. It mainly occurs in the southern and south-eastern parts of the country, in areas of the Atlantic Forest.

The length of the forewings is 34 mm for males and 42 mm for females. Adults are on wing from September to April.

There are some records of larvae foraging in Tillandsia aeranthos, but the food plant is unknown.

== Subspecies ==
- Hista fabricii fabricii (Brazil)
- Hista fabricii boisduvalii (Walker, 1854) (Brazil)
- Hista fabricii papagaya (Westwood, 1877) (Brazil)

== Etymology ==
The specific epithet is a tribute to Johan Christian Fabricius (1745-1808).
