= Synpalamides orestes =

Scientific classification
- Kingdom: Animalia
- Phylum: Arthropoda
- Class: Insecta
- Order: Lepidoptera
- Family: Castniidae
- Genus: Synpalamides
- Species: S. orestes

Binomial name
- Synpalamides orestes (Walker, 1854)

Synonyms
- Castnia orestes; Castnia umbrata; Castnia f. leopoldina

Species of moth

Synpalamides orestes is a moth of the family Castniidae. It was described by Francis Walker in 1854, and is known from Brazil.
