= Mirocastnia smalli =

Scientific classification
- Domain: Eukaryota
- Kingdom: Animalia
- Phylum: Arthropoda
- Class: Insecta
- Order: Lepidoptera
- Family: Castniidae
- Genus: Mirocastnia
- Species: M. smalli

Binomial name
- Mirocastnia smalli Miller, 1980

Species of moth

Mirocastnia smalli is a moth in the Castniidae family. It is found in Panama. The habitat consists of a forest with Colpothrinax cookii palms, several moss covered trees and Bromeliaceae species.

The length of the forewings is 21.5–26 mm for males and 19.5–29 mm for females. Adults are on wing from March to August. They mimic Pythonides limaea.

== Etymology ==
The species is named for Gordon B. Small, who first collected the species.
