= Lapaeumides zerynthia =

Scientific classification
- Kingdom: Animalia
- Phylum: Arthropoda
- Class: Insecta
- Order: Lepidoptera
- Family: Castniidae
- Genus: Lapaeumides
- Species: L. zerynthia

Binomial name
- Lapaeumides zerynthia (Gray, 1838)

Synonyms
- Castnia zerynthia Gray, 1838; Castnia langsdorfii Ménétriés, 1857 (preocc. Ménétriés, 1829); Castnia amazona Buchecker, [1880]

Species of moth

Lapaeumides zerynthia is a moth in the Castniidae family. It is found in Brazil, in the Neotropical realm. This species is likely found in lowland tropical forests, but future research is needed to confirm this.
