= Mirocastnia canis =

Scientific classification
- Domain: Eukaryota
- Kingdom: Animalia
- Phylum: Arthropoda
- Class: Insecta
- Order: Lepidoptera
- Family: Castniidae
- Genus: Mirocastnia
- Species: M. canis

Binomial name
- Mirocastnia canis (Lathy, 1923)

Synonyms
- Schaefferia canis Lathy, 1923

Species of moth

Mirocastnia canis is a moth in the Castniidae family. It is found in Peru.

The length of the forewings is about 29.4 mm.
