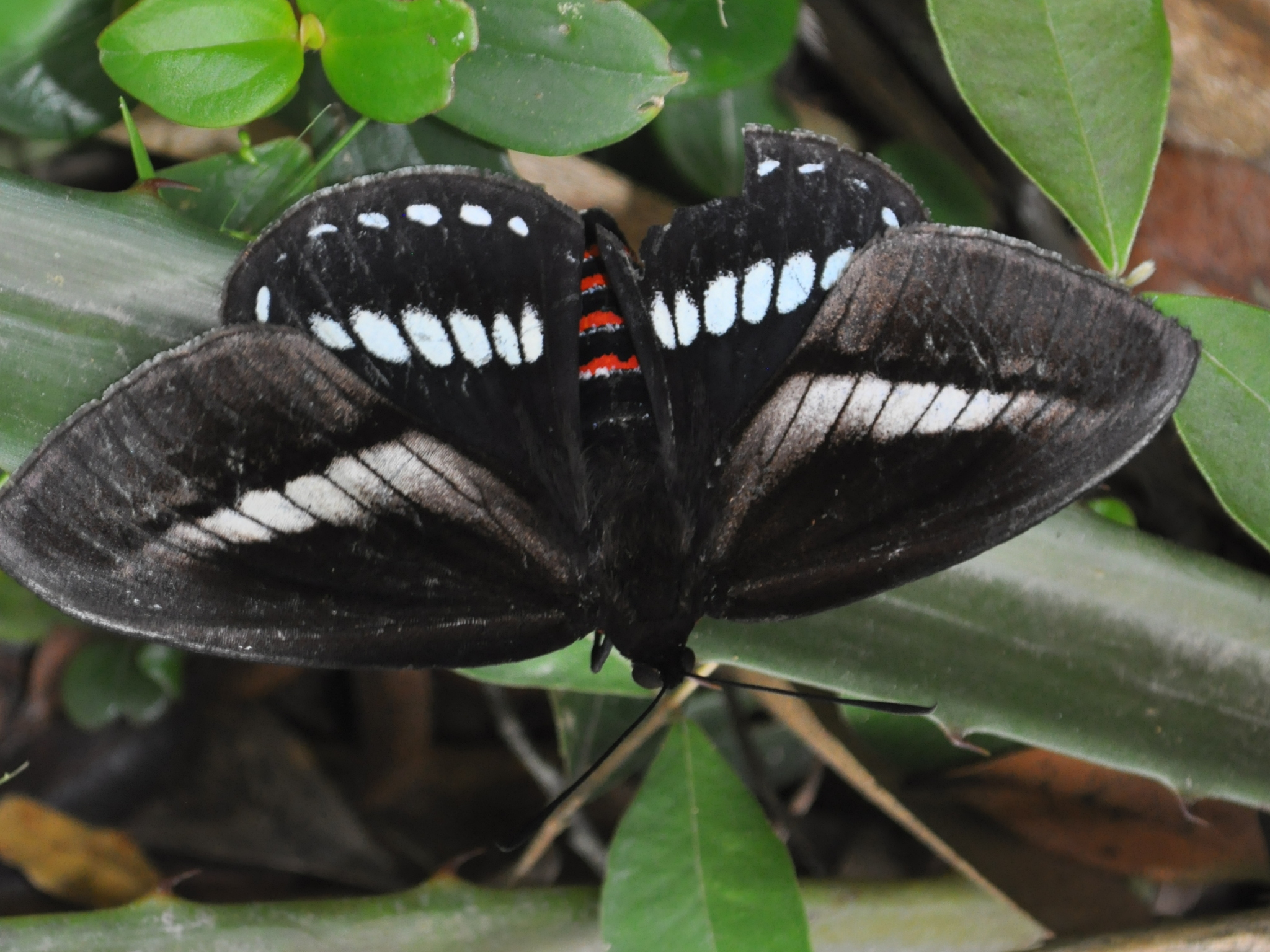
- Prometheus cochrus, Brazil

Scientific classification
- Kingdom: Animalia
- Phylum: Arthropoda
- Class: Insecta
- Order: Lepidoptera
- Family: Castniidae
- Genus: Prometheus; Hübner, [1824]
- Species: P. cochrus

Binomial name
- Prometheus cochrus (Fabricius, 1787)

Synonyms
- Papilio cochrus Fabricius, 1787; Prometheus casmilus Hübner, [1824]; Castnia maris Dalman, 1824; Castnia garbei Foetterle, 1902; Castnia f. bipunctata Strand, 1913; Castnia f. combinata Strand, 1913; Castnia f. depunctata Strand, 1913; Castnia f. tripunctata Strand, 1913; Castnia houlberti Rothschild, 1919; Castnia cochrus intermedia Raymundo, 1930 (preocc. Pfeiffer, 1917); Castnia cochrus osmani Raymundo, 1931

= Prometheus cochrus =

Species of moth

Prometheus cochrus is a species in the moth genus Prometheus of the family Castniidae. The genus erected by Jacob Hübner in 1824. The species was first described by Johan Christian Fabricius in 1787. It is found in Brazil and Paraguay.
