= Castnius pelasgus =

Scientific classification
- Domain: Eukaryota
- Kingdom: Animalia
- Phylum: Arthropoda
- Class: Insecta
- Order: Lepidoptera
- Family: Castniidae
- Genus: Castnius
- Species: C. pelasgus

Binomial name
- Castnius pelasgus (Cramer, [1779])

Synonyms
- Papilio pelasgus Cramer, [1779]; Castnia unifasciata R. Felder, 1874; Castnia fulvofasciata Houlbert, 1917

Species of moth

Castnius pelasgus is a moth in the Castniidae family. It is found in Suriname, Peru and Amazonas.

The wingspan is about 60 mm.

== Subspecies ==
- Castnius pelasgus pelasgus (Surinam)
- Castnius pelasgus fulvofasciata (Houlbert, 1917) (Peru, Amazonas)
