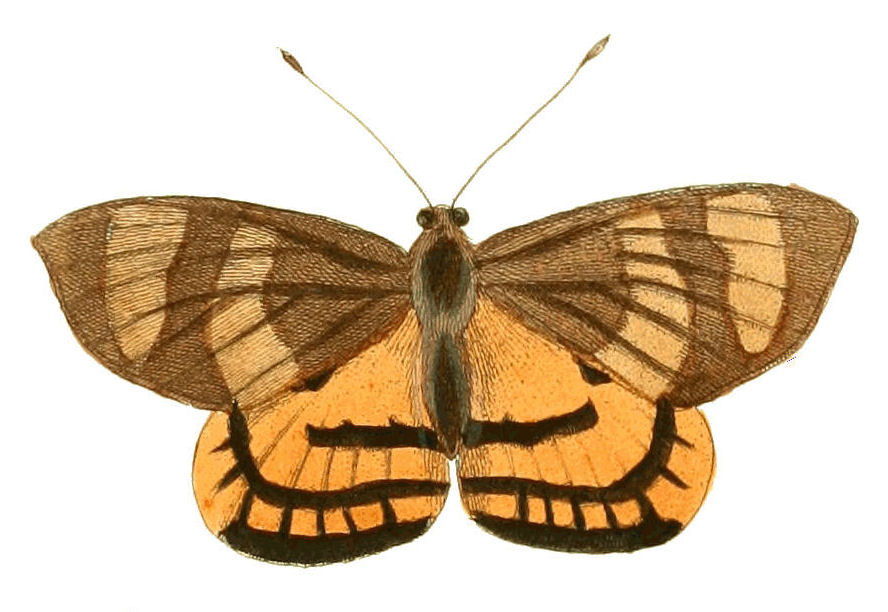
- Illustration by Dru Drury

Scientific classification
- Domain: Eukaryota
- Kingdom: Animalia
- Phylum: Arthropoda
- Class: Insecta
- Order: Lepidoptera
- Family: Castniidae
- Genus: Ceretes
- Species: C. thais

Binomial name
- Ceretes thais (Drury, 1782)

Synonyms
- Papilio thais Drury, 1782; Papilio chremes Fabricius, 1793; Corybantes nicon Hübner, [1822]; Castnia thalaira Godart, [1824]; Castnia nicon Gray, 1838 (preocc. Hübner, [1822]); Castnia morphoides Walker, [1865]; Chremes jonesii Buchecker, [1876]; Ceretes thais var. gracillima Houlbert, 1918

= Ceretes thais =

Species of moth

Ceretes thais is a moth in the family Castniidae. It is found in Brazil. Superficially it looks very like a butterfly, and was originally placed by Dru Drury in the "Papilio (Danaus Festivus)" group which mostly corresponds with modern Nymphalidae.

== Description ==
Upper side: Antennae brown. Thorax, abdomen, and anterior wings red brown; the latter having two streaks or bars of a lighter colour crossing them from the anterior edges to the posterior and external ones; one crossing the middle of the wing, the other nearer the tips. Posterior wings orange; the lower part black along the external edge, whereon are placed a row of square orange coloured spots, those next the upper corners reaching to the edge; a black line also crosses these wings, beginning just below the body, and running almost across to the upper corner.

Under side: Palpi and thorax red-brown. Abdomen yellowish. Anterior wings yellowish clay coloured, with three black lines crossing them transversely, the middle one being the broadest. Posterior wings orange brown, with a small white spot placed near the centre. Margins of the wings plain. Wing-span 2 1/2 inches (64 mm).
