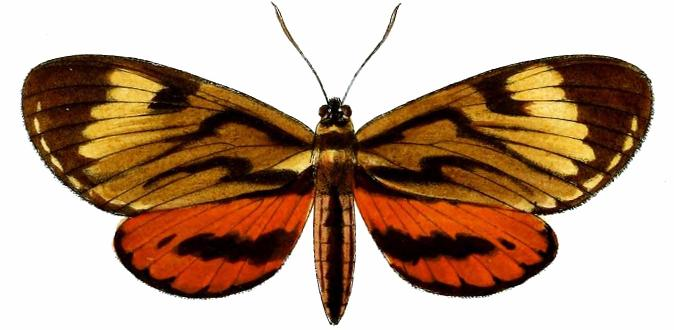

Scientific classification
- Kingdom: Animalia
- Phylum: Arthropoda
- Class: Insecta
- Order: Lepidoptera
- Family: Castniidae
- Genus: Duboisvalia
- Species: D. cononia

Binomial name
- Duboisvalia cononia (Westwood, 1877)

Synonyms
- Castnia cononia Westwood, 1877; Castnia mars Druce, 1883; Castnia cononioides Strand, 1914; Castnia hahneli var. canelosina Strand, 1914; Gazera praedata Houlbert, 1917; Castnia mocoana Niepelt, 1930; Castnia amazonica Strand, 1913; Castnia mars Preiss, 1899 (preocc. Druce, 1883); Castnia duckei Fassl, 1921; Castnia boyi Röber, 1931

= Duboisvalia cononia =

Species of moth

Duboisvalia cononia is a moth in the Castniidae family. It is found in Ecuador, Colombia, Peru and Brazil.

== Subspecies ==
- Duboisvalia cononia cononia (Ecuador, Colombia)
- Duboisvalia cononia amazonica (Strand, 1913) (Peru)
- Duboisvalia cononia duckei (Fassl, 1921) (Brazil: Para, Amazonas)
