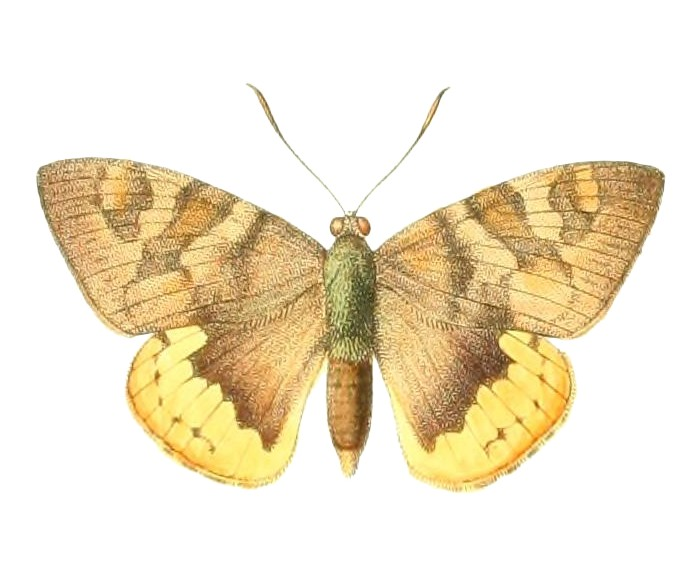

Scientific classification
- Domain: Eukaryota
- Kingdom: Animalia
- Phylum: Arthropoda
- Class: Insecta
- Order: Lepidoptera
- Family: Castniidae
- Genus: Synpalamides
- Species: S. phalaris

Binomial name
- Synpalamides phalaris (Fabricius, 1793)

Synonyms
- Papilio phalaris Fabricius, 1793; Synpalamides mimon Hübner, [1823]; Castnia mygdon Dalman, 1824; Castnia subvaria Walker, 1854; Castnia dionaea Hopffer, 1856; Synpalamides dionaea; Castnia albofasciata Schaufuss, 1870; Castnia argus Boisduval, [1875]; Castnia klugii Boisduval, [1875]; Castnia musarum Westwood, 1877; Castnia sora Druce, 1896; Castnia subvaria f. subvariana Strand, 1913; Sympalamides mimon var. lombardi Houlbert, 1918; Castnia signata Talbot & Prout, 1919; Castnia argus

= Synpalamides phalaris =

Species of moth

Synpalamides phalaris is a moth of the Castniidae family. It is commonly known from southern Brazil, Uruguay and Paraguay, but has also been recorded from northern Argentina and Trinidad.

The larvae feed on Guzmania and Bromelia species.
