= Corybantes delopia =

Scientific classification
- Kingdom: Animalia
- Phylum: Arthropoda
- Clade: Pancrustacea
- Class: Insecta
- Order: Lepidoptera
- Family: Castniidae
- Genus: Corybantes
- Species: C. delopia

Binomial name
- Corybantes delopia (Druce 1907)

Species of moth

Corybantes delopia, sometimes spelled Corybantes dolopia, is a species of moth in the family Castniidae, the butterfly moths and sun moths. This moth is found in Ecuador.

== Taxonomy ==
Corybantes delopia was first formally described as Castnia dolopia by entomologist Herbert Druce in 1907, with its type location given as Los Llanos, Ecuador. Castnia fusca was described as a separate species by entomologist Constant Houlbert, but was later reclassified and merged with Castnia delopia in 1917. In 1995, the species was moved to the genus Corybantes by Gerardo Lamas.

== Etymology ==
The name of the genus Corybantes comes from the Greek word Korybantes (Ancient Greek: Κορύβαντες), a group of dancers who worshipped the Phrygian goddess Cybele. The specific epithet, delopia, comes from the mountainous region of Greece, Dolopia (Ancient Greek: Δολοπία).

== Description ==
Like the other members of the family of Castniidae, Corybantes delopia looks very much like a butterfly. The females of this species have a dark brown head, collar, and thorax, as well as dark brown tegulae. The abdomen is black, as well as the antennae. The tips of the antennae are a pale brown color. The forewings are dark brown glossed with green, with a large, grayish-brown spot at the end of the cell. A series of dull grayish-brown spots edged with black crosses the wing from near the apex. Two lunar-shaped black marks are located beneath the spots on the inner margin. The hindwings are black, with the base shot with blueish-green. A row of brownish-white spots crosses the wing from near the anal angle almost reaching the apex. The fringe is a brownish-white color. The underside of both the forewings and hindwings is pale brown, with all the spots more distinct and edged with black.
