= Amauta hodeei =

Scientific classification
- Domain: Eukaryota
- Kingdom: Animalia
- Phylum: Arthropoda
- Class: Insecta
- Order: Lepidoptera
- Family: Castniidae
- Genus: Amauta
- Species: A. hodeei

Binomial name
- Amauta hodeei (Oberthür, 1881)

Synonyms
- Castnia hodeei Oberthür, 1881; Castnia corrupta Schaus, 1896; Castnia apollinaris Oberthür, 1925 (nom. nud); Xanthocastnia amazona Knop, 1925 (preocc.); Castnia kruegeri Niepelt, 1927

Species of moth

Amauta hodeei is a moth in the Castniidae family. It is found in Colombia.

== Subspecies ==
- Amauta hodeei hodeei (Colombia)
- Amauta hodeei kruegeri (Niepelt, 1927) (Colombia)
