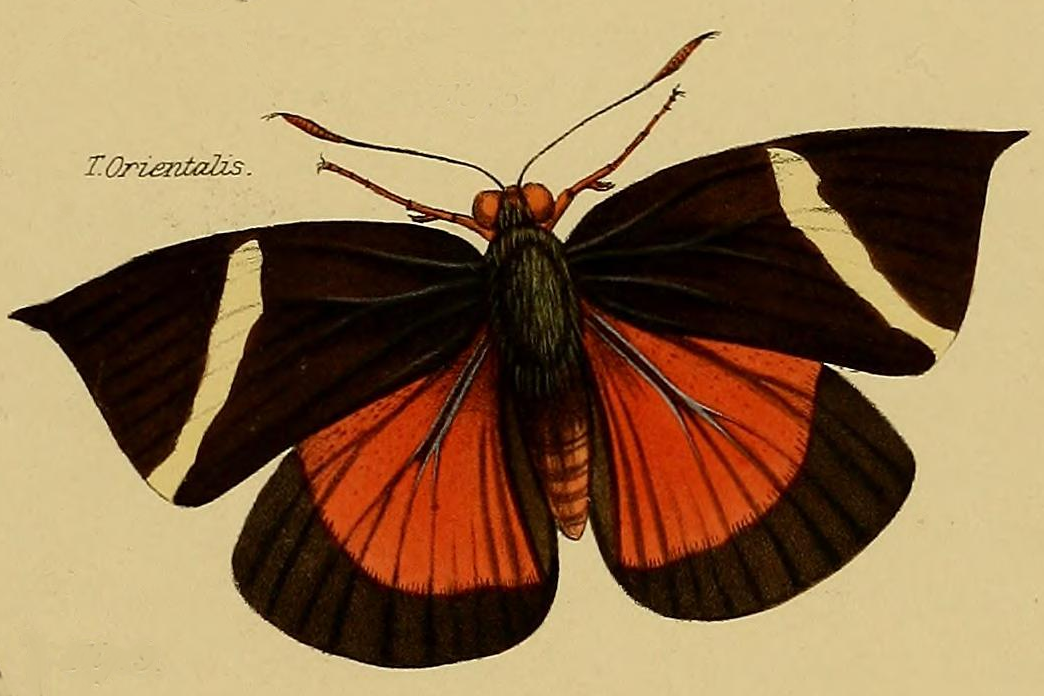
- Mounted specimen illustrated in the original description

Scientific classification
- Kingdom: Animalia
- Phylum: Arthropoda
- Class: Insecta
- Order: Lepidoptera
- Family: Castniidae
- Genus: Tascina
- Species: T. orientalis

Binomial name
- Tascina orientalis Westwood, 1877

= Tascina orientalis =

Species of moth

Tascina orientalis is a moth in the Castniidae family. It is found in Singapore and Peninsular Malaysia.

Adults have orange hindwings with a broad black border.
