= Castnius marcus =

Scientific classification
- Domain: Eukaryota
- Kingdom: Animalia
- Phylum: Arthropoda
- Class: Insecta
- Order: Lepidoptera
- Family: Castniidae
- Genus: Castnius
- Species: C. marcus

Binomial name
- Castnius marcus (Jordan, 1908)

Synonyms
- Castnia marcus Jordan, 1908

Species of moth

Castnius marcus is a moth in the Castniidae family. It is found in Peru.
