= Tosxampila mimica =

Scientific classification
- Kingdom: Animalia
- Phylum: Arthropoda
- Class: Insecta
- Order: Lepidoptera
- Family: Castniidae
- Genus: Tosxampila
- Species: T. mimica

Binomial name
- Tosxampila mimica (Felder, 1874)

Synonyms
- Castnia mimica Felder, 1874

Species of moth

Tosxampila mimica is a moth in the Castniidae family. It is found in Amazonas, Brazil.
