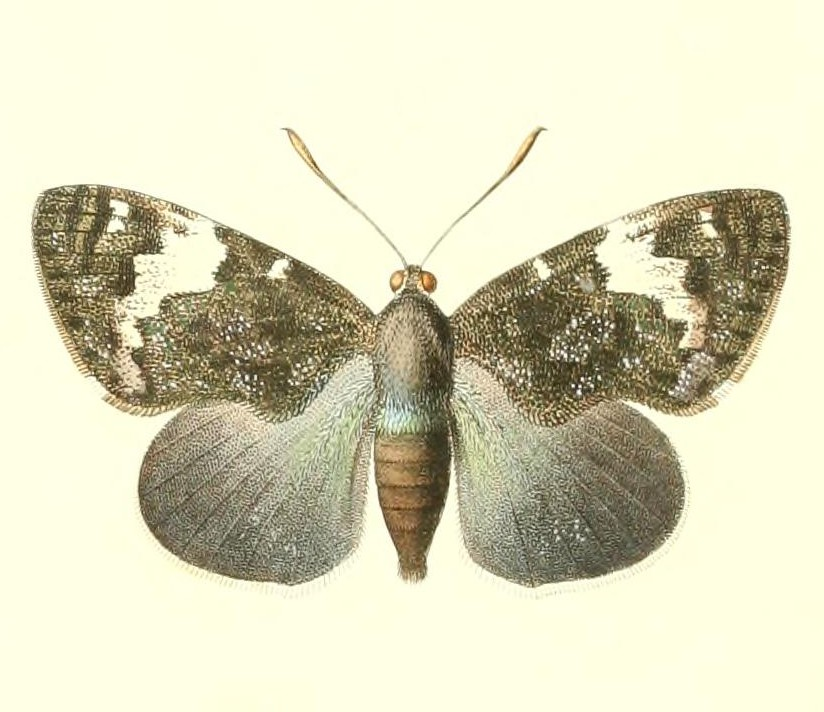

Scientific classification
- Domain: Eukaryota
- Kingdom: Animalia
- Phylum: Arthropoda
- Class: Insecta
- Order: Lepidoptera
- Family: Castniidae
- Genus: Feschaeria
- Species: F. amycus

Binomial name
- Feschaeria amycus (Cramer, [1779])

Synonyms
- Papilio amycus Cramer, [1779]; Schaefferia amycus; Castnia amycus

= Feschaeria amycus =

Species of moth

Feschaeria amycus is a moth in the Castniidae family. It has been recorded from Guyana, Brazil, Venezuela and Tobago.
