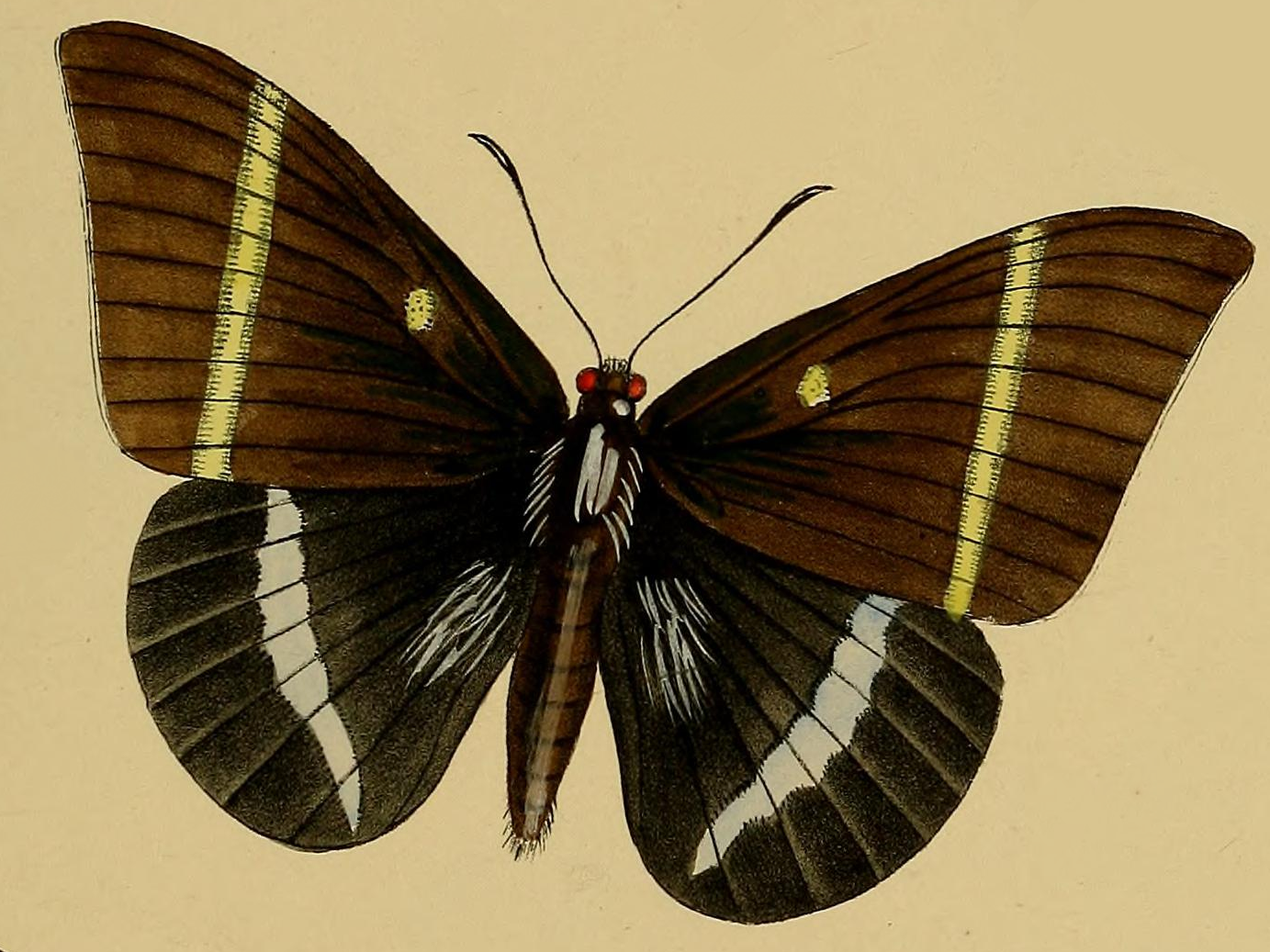

Scientific classification
- Kingdom: Animalia
- Phylum: Arthropoda
- Class: Insecta
- Order: Lepidoptera
- Family: Castniidae
- Genus: Amauta
- Species: A. papilionaris

Binomial name
- Amauta papilionaris (Walker, [1865])

Synonyms
- Castnia papilionaris Walker, [1865]; Castnia amethystina Houlbert, 1917; Castnia velutina Houlbert, 1917; Castnia strandi Röber, 1927 (preocc.); Castnia strandiata Röber, 1927

= Amauta papilionaris =

Species of moth

Amauta papilionaris is a moth in the Castniidae family. It is found in Colombia, Venezuela, Peru, Bolivia, Ecuador and Panama.

The wingspan is about 103–135 mm.

== Subspecies ==
- Amauta papilionaris papilionaris (Colombia)
- Amauta papilionaris amethystina (Houlbert, 1917) (Venezuela, Colombia, Panama)
- Amauta papilionaris lionela Lamas, 1995 (Peru, Bolivia)
- Amauta papilionaris velutina (Houlbert, 1917) (Ecuador)
