= Lapaeumides ctesiphon =

Scientific classification
- Kingdom: Animalia
- Phylum: Arthropoda
- Clade: Pancrustacea
- Class: Insecta
- Order: Lepidoptera
- Family: Castniidae
- Genus: Lapaeumides
- Species: L. ctesiphon

Binomial name
- Lapaeumides ctesiphon (Hübner, [1820])

Synonyms
- Eupalamides ctesiphon Hübner, [1820]; Castnia schreibersi Mikán, [1823]; Castnia latreille Godart, [1824]; Castnia ctesiphon Schaufuss, 1870 (preocc. Hübner, [1820])

Species of moth

Lapaeumides ctesiphon is a moth in the Castniidae family. It is found in Brazil.

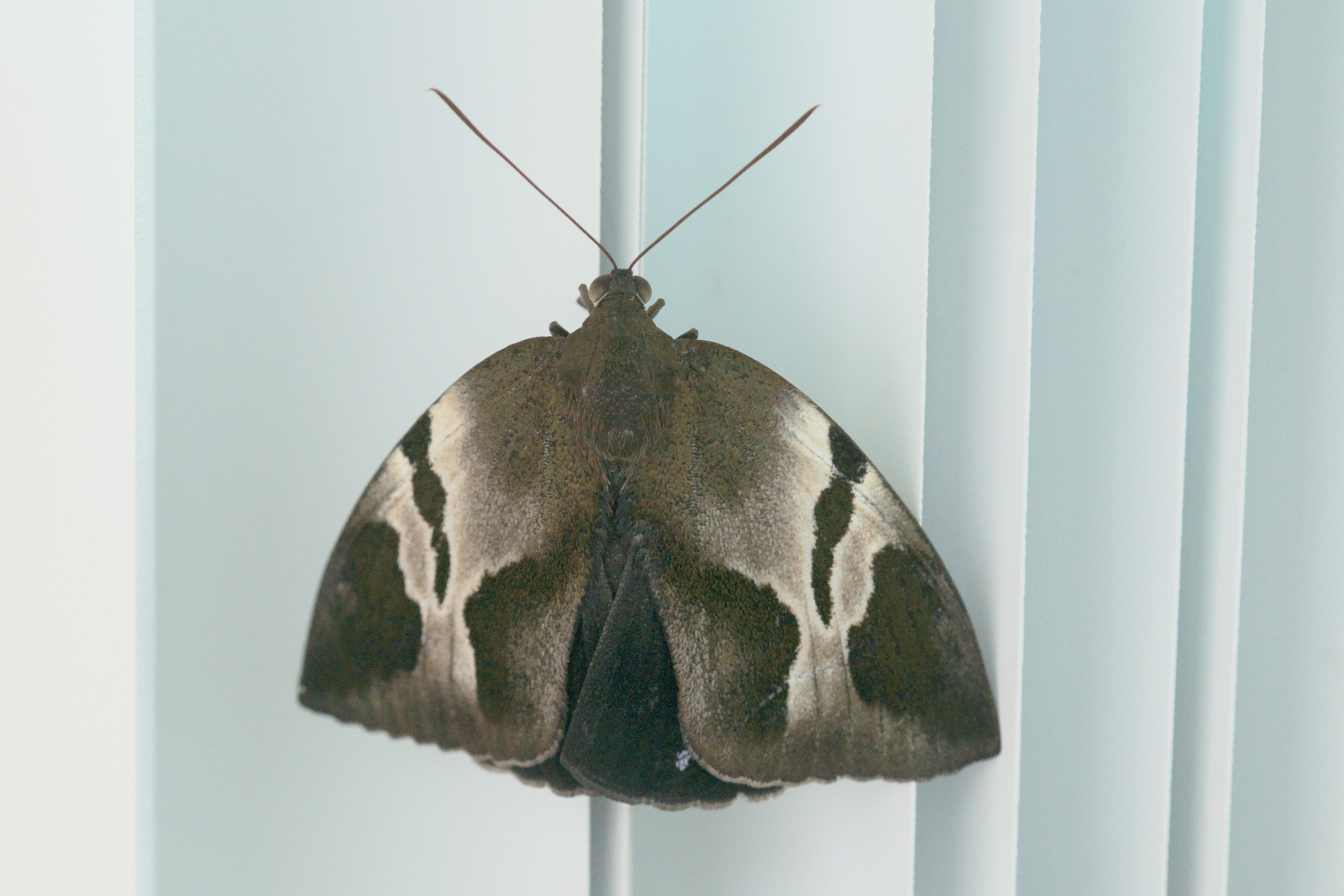
Lapaeumides ctesiphon
