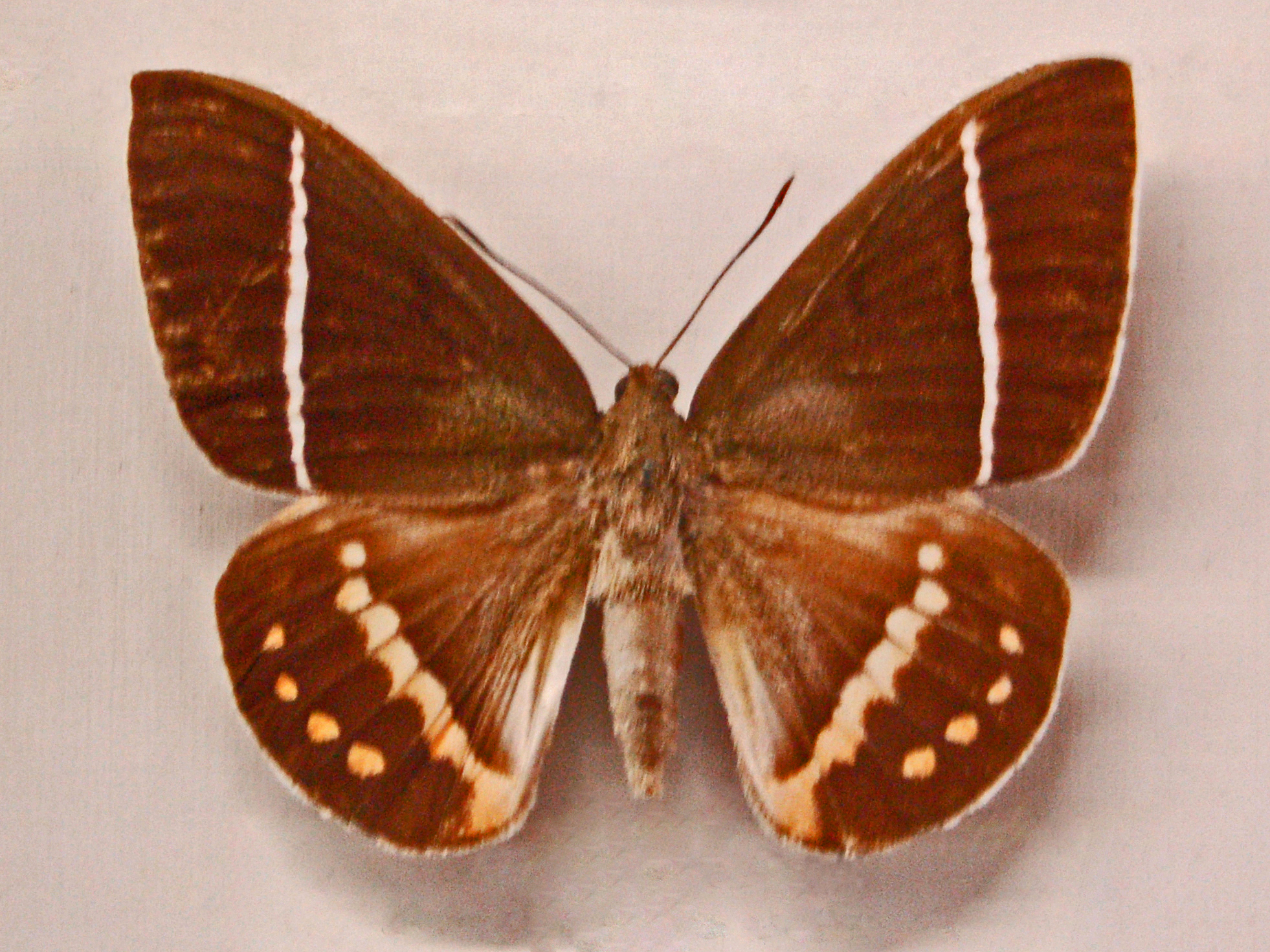

Scientific classification
- Domain: Eukaryota
- Kingdom: Animalia
- Phylum: Arthropoda
- Class: Insecta
- Order: Lepidoptera
- Family: Castniidae
- Genus: Amauta
- Species: A. cacica

Binomial name
- Amauta cacica (Herrich-Schäffer, [1854])

Synonyms
- Castnia cacica Herrich-Schäffer, [1854]; Castnia angusta Druce, 1907; Castnia angusta var. subangusta Strand, 1913; Castnia jeanneei Rebel, 1915; Castnia oberthüri Houlbert, 1917; Castnia procera Boisduval, [1875]; Graya panamensis Buchecker, [1880]; Castnia cacica ab. bivittifera Strand, 1913; Castnia cacica ab. macula Strand, 1913

= Amauta cacica =

Species of moth

Amauta cacica, the sugar-cane borer moth, is a moth in the Castniidae family. It is found in Colombia, Ecuador, Guatemala, Costa Rica and Panama.

The larvae feed on plantains and can cause moderate damage. Other recorded food plants include Heliconia griggsiana. They bore the roots of their host plant. From the initial penetration, larvae tunnel into the corm of the plantain and feed there until close to maturity. The mature larva tunnels upwards in the plantain stalk to an average height of one meter, where it makes an exit hole. The larva retreats back down the tunnel about 30 cm, where it pupates inside a case made of fibers from its host plant.

== Subspecies ==
- Amauta cacica cacica (Colombia)
- Amauta cacica angusta (Druce, 1907) (Ecuador)
- Amauta cacica procera (Boisduval, [1875]) (Guatemala, Panama, Costa Rica)
