= Haemonides cronis =

Scientific classification
- Domain: Eukaryota
- Kingdom: Animalia
- Phylum: Arthropoda
- Class: Insecta
- Order: Lepidoptera
- Family: Castniidae
- Genus: Haemonides
- Species: H. cronis

Binomial name
- Haemonides cronis (Cramer, [1775])

Synonyms
- Papilio cronis Cramer, [1775]; Castnia cronissa Godart, [1824]; Castnia var. corningii H. Edwards, 1891; Castnia lutea Houlbert, 1917; Haemonides urichi Lathy, 1923

Species of moth

Haemonides cronis is a moth in the Castniidae family. It is found in Mexico, Trinidad, Suriname, French Guiana, Brazil and Peru.

Adults have been recorded feeding on flowers of Warszewiczia coccinea.

The larvae have been recorded feeding on Bombacopsis quinata.

== Subspecies ==
- Haemonides cronis cronis (Suriname, French Guiana, Mexico, Trinidad)
- Haemonides cronis emiliae (Fassl, 1921) (Brazil)
- Haemonides cronis odila (Houlbert, 1917) (Peru)
