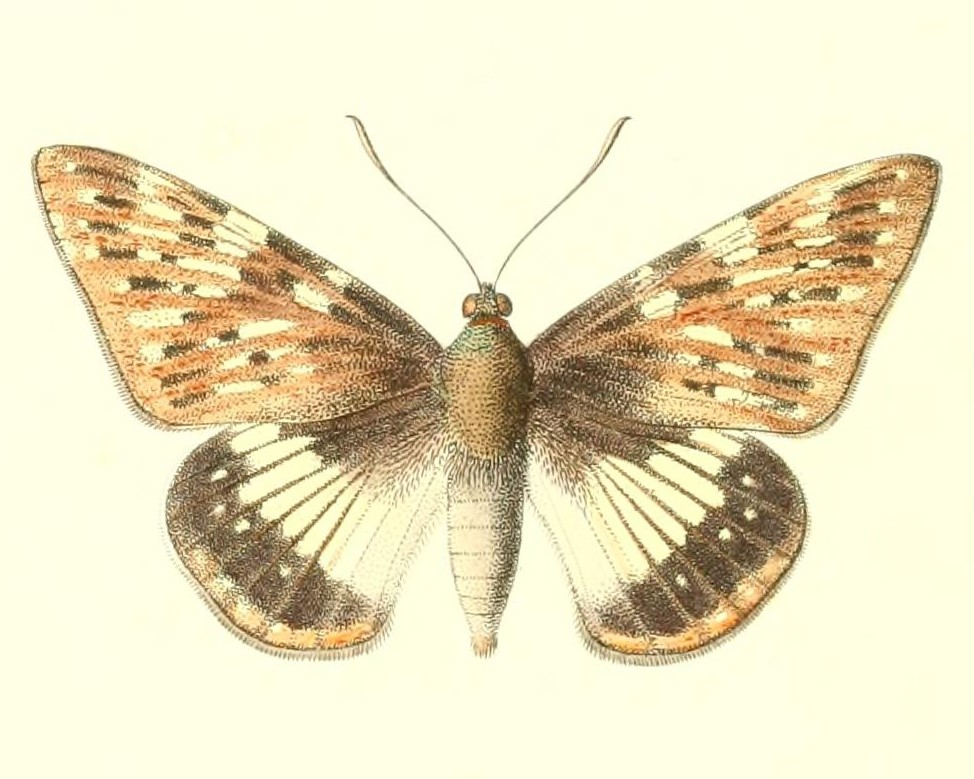

Scientific classification
- Kingdom: Animalia
- Phylum: Arthropoda
- Class: Insecta
- Order: Lepidoptera
- Family: Castniidae
- Genus: Spilopastes; Houlbert, 1918
- Species: S. galinthias

Binomial name
- Spilopastes galinthias (Hopffer, 1856)

Synonyms
- Castnia galinthias Hopffer, 1856

= Spilopastes =

Genus of moths

Spilopastes is a genus of moths within the Castniidae family, containing one species, Spilopastes galinthias which is known from Brazil.
