= Ceretes marcelserres =

Scientific classification
- Domain: Eukaryota
- Kingdom: Animalia
- Phylum: Arthropoda
- Class: Insecta
- Order: Lepidoptera
- Family: Castniidae
- Genus: Ceretes
- Species: C. marcelserres

Binomial name
- Ceretes marcelserres (Godart, [1824])

Synonyms
- Castnia marcelserres Godart, [1824]; Castnia inornata Walker, 1869; Castnia f. pusillima Strand, 1913; Castnia marcel-serresi ab. nigrita Rothschild, 1919

Species of moth

Ceretes marcelserres is a moth in the Castniidae family. It is found in south-eastern Brazil and Paraguay.
