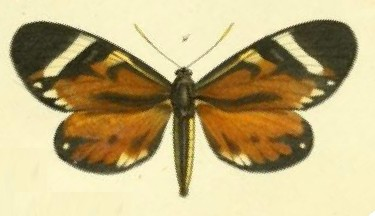

Scientific classification
- Domain: Eukaryota
- Kingdom: Animalia
- Phylum: Arthropoda
- Class: Insecta
- Order: Lepidoptera
- Family: Castniidae
- Genus: Duboisvalia
- Species: D. simulans

Binomial name
- Duboisvalia simulans (Boisduval, [1875])

Synonyms
- Gazera simulans Boisduval, [1875]; Castnia intermedia Pfeiffer, 1917; Castnia melessus columbiana Rothschild, 1919; Castnia garleppi Preiss, 1899; Castnia hahneli Preiss, 1899; Castnia melessus Druce, 1890; Castnia michaeli Preiss, 1899; Castnia modificata Strand, 1913; Castnia securis Talbot, 1929; Castnia songata Strand, 1913

= Duboisvalia simulans =

Species of moth

Duboisvalia simulans is a moth in the Castniidae family. It is found in Colombia, Bolivia, Venezuela, Peru and Brazil.

== Subspecies ==
- Duboisvalia simulans simulans (Colombia, Bolivia, Venezuela)
- Duboisvalia simulans melessus (Druce, 1890) (Peru)
- Duboisvalia simulans michaeli (Preiss, 1899) (Brazil: Amazonas)
- Duboisvalia simulans modificata (Strand, 1913) (Colombia)
- Duboisvalia simulans securis (Talbot, 1929) (Brazil: Amazonas)
- Duboisvalia simulans songata (Strand, 1913) (Bolivia)
- Duboisvalia simulans tarapotensis (Preiss, 1899) (Peru)
