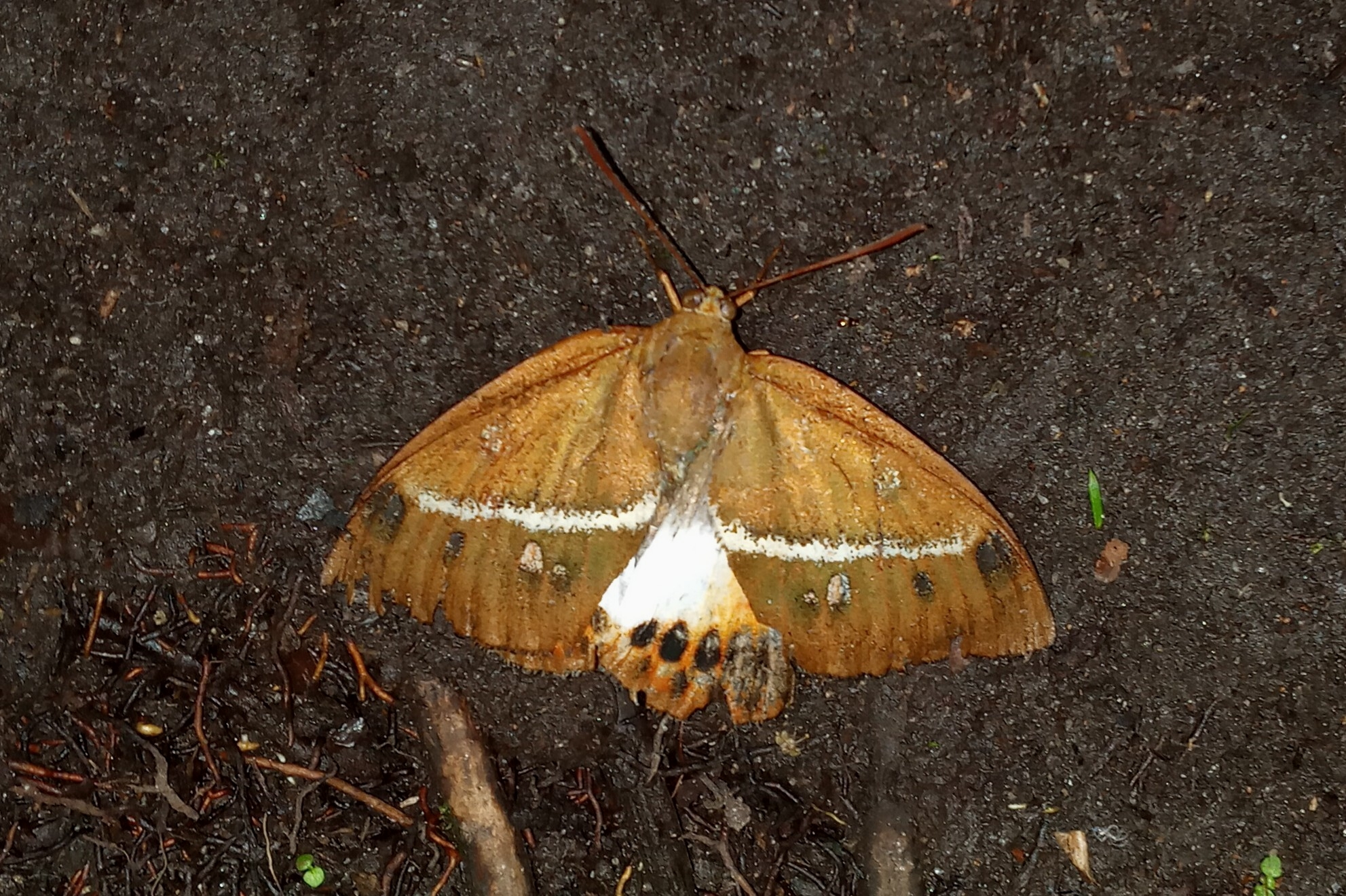

Scientific classification
- Kingdom: Animalia
- Phylum: Arthropoda
- Clade: Pancrustacea
- Class: Insecta
- Order: Lepidoptera
- Family: Castniidae
- Genus: Yagra
- Species: Y. dalmannii

Binomial name
- Yagra dalmannii (Gray, 1838)

Synonyms
- Castnia dalmannii Gray, 1838; Castnia grayi Boisduval, [1875]; Castnia amazona Buchecker, [1889] (nomen nudum)

= Yagra dalmannii =

Species of moth

Yagra dalmannii is a species of moth in the family Castniidae. It is found in Brazil.
