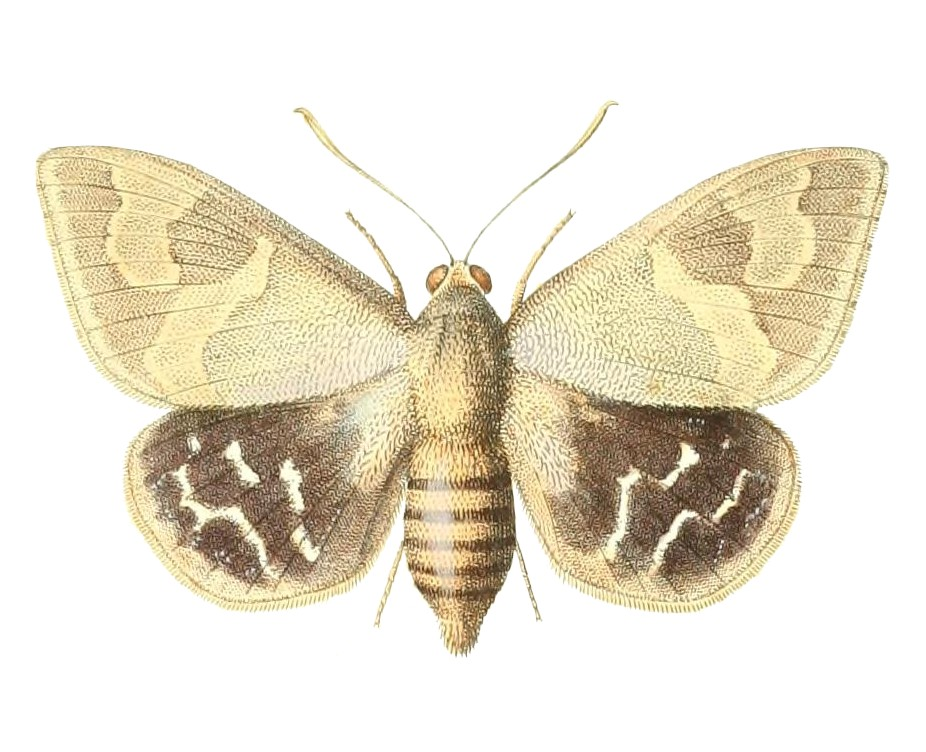

Scientific classification
- Kingdom: Animalia
- Phylum: Arthropoda
- Class: Insecta
- Order: Lepidoptera
- Family: Castniidae
- Genus: Synpalamides
- Species: S. chelone

Binomial name
- Synpalamides chelone (Hopffer, 1856)

Synonyms
- Castnia chelone Hopffer, 1856

= Synpalamides chelone =

Species of moth

Synpalamides chelone is a moth of the Castniidae family. It is known to be found in Mexico.
