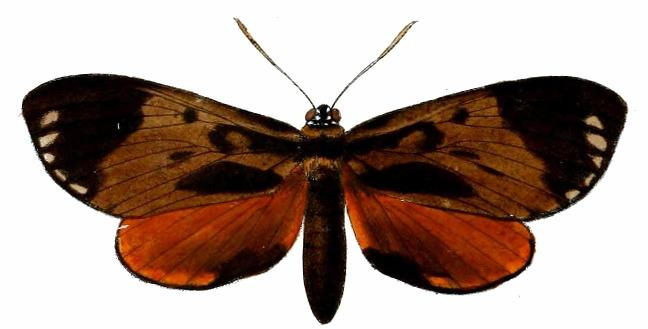

Scientific classification
- Kingdom: Animalia
- Phylum: Arthropoda
- Class: Insecta
- Order: Lepidoptera
- Family: Castniidae
- Genus: Duboisvalia
- Species: D. ecuadoria

Binomial name
- Duboisvalia ecuadoria (Westwood, 1877)

Synonyms
- Castnia ecuadoria Westwood, 1877; Castnia buckleyi Druce, 1883; Gazera albicornis Houlbert, 1917; Castnia melanolimbata Strand, 1913; Castnia pellonia Druce, 1890; Castnia coarctifascia Talbot, 1929; Gazera plethoneura Bryk, 1930; Castnia strandi Niepelt, 1914; Castnia truxilla Westwood, 1877; Castnia truxilla fassli Pfeiffer, 1914; Castnia pellonia catenigera Pfeiffer, 1917; Castnia pellonia extensa Pfeiffer, 1917; Castnia pellonia punctimargo Rothschild, 1919

= Duboisvalia ecuadoria =

Species of moth

Duboisvalia ecuadoria is a moth in the Castniidae family. It is found in Ecuador, Colombia, Peru and Bolivia.

== Subspecies ==
- Duboisvalia ecuadoria ecuadoria (Ecuador)
- Duboisvalia ecuadoria albicornis (Houlbert, 1917) (Peru)
- Duboisvalia ecuadoria cratina (Westwood, 1877)
- Duboisvalia ecuadoria melanolimbata (Strand, 1913) (Peru)
- Duboisvalia ecuadoria pellonia (Druce, 1890) (Ecuador)
- Duboisvalia ecuadoria plethoneura (Bryk, 1930) (Ecuador)
- Duboisvalia ecuadoria strandi (Niepelt, 1914) (Bolivia)
- Duboisvalia ecuadoria truxilla (Westwood, 1877) (Colombia)
