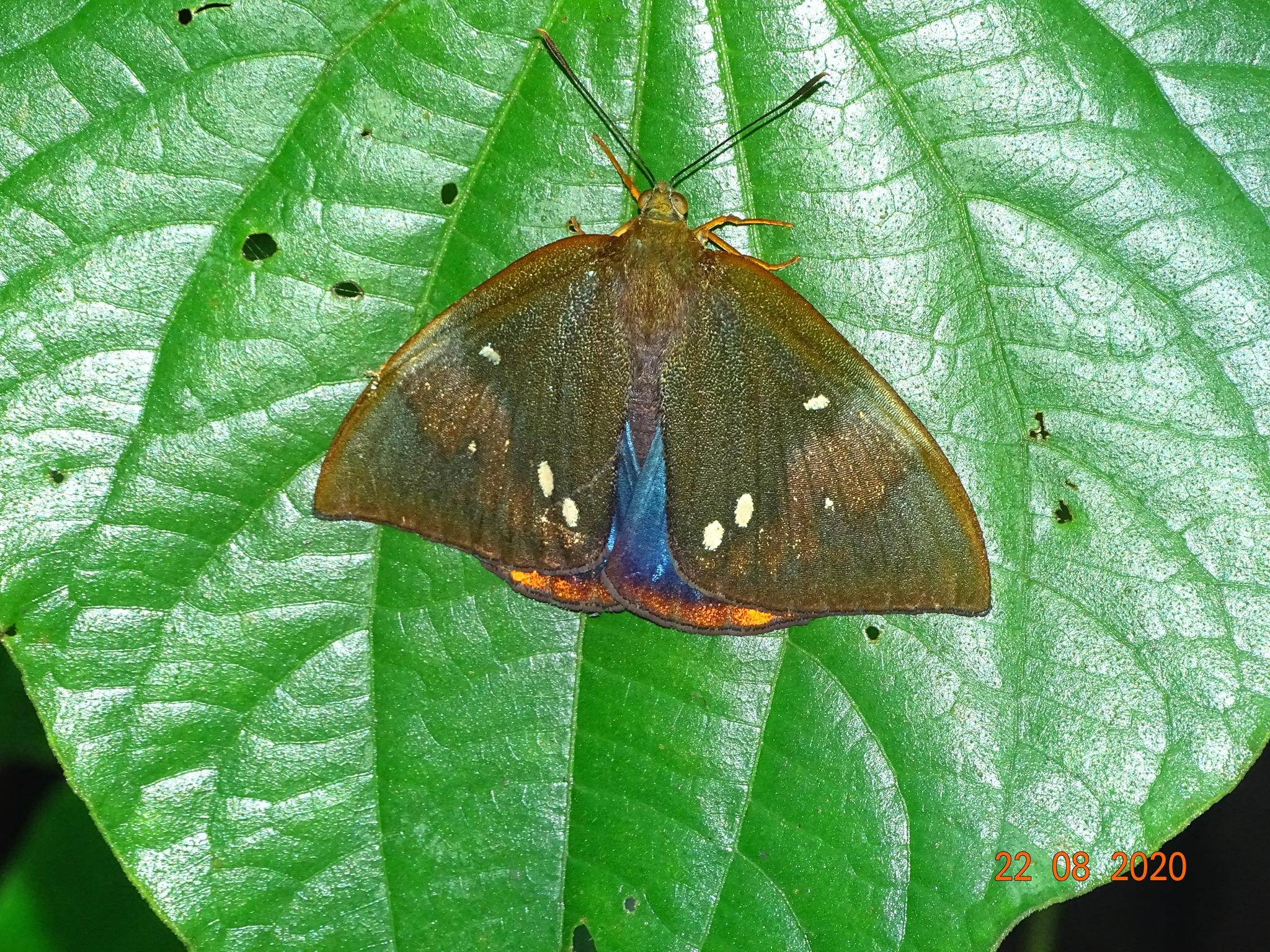

Scientific classification
- Kingdom: Animalia
- Phylum: Arthropoda
- Class: Insecta
- Order: Lepidoptera
- Family: Castniidae
- Genus: Divana; Miller, 1982
- Species: D. diva

Binomial name
- Divana diva (Butler, 1870)

Synonyms
- Castnia diva Butler, 1870; Castnia chiriquiensis Strand, 1913; Castnia hoppi Hering, 1923; Castnia tricolor R. Felder, 1874

= Divana =

Genus of moths

Divana is a genus of moths within the family Castniidae. It was erected by Jacqueline Y. Miller in 1982, and contains the single species Divana diva, first described by Arthur Gardiner Butler in 1870. It is known from Nicaragua, Panama, and Colombia.

== Subspecies ==
- Divana diva diva (Nicaragua)
- Divana diva chiriquiensis (Strand, 1913) (Panama)
- Divana diva hoppi (Hering, 1923) (Colombia)
- Divana diva tricolor (R. Felder, 1874) (Colombia)
