= Mirocastnia =

Scientific classification
- Domain: Eukaryota
- Kingdom: Animalia
- Phylum: Arthropoda
- Class: Insecta
- Order: Lepidoptera
- Family: Castniidae
- Genus: Mirocastnia; Miller, 1980

Genus of moths

Mirocastnia is a genus of moths within the family Castniidae.

== Species ==
- Mirocastnia canis (Lathy, 1923)
- Mirocastnia pyrrhopygoides (Houlbert, 1917)
- Mirocastnia smalli Miller, 1980
