= Yagra (moth) =

Scientific classification
- Domain: Eukaryota
- Kingdom: Animalia
- Phylum: Arthropoda
- Class: Insecta
- Order: Lepidoptera
- Family: Castniidae
- Genus: Yagra; Oiticica, 1955

Genus of moths

Yagra is a genus of moths within the family Castniidae.

== Species ==
- Yagra dalmannii (Gray, 1838)
- Yagra fonscolombe (Godart, [1824])
