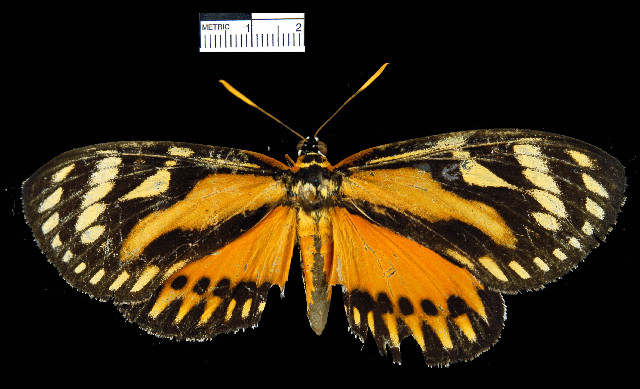
- Zegara zagraea dorsal view

Scientific classification
- Kingdom: Animalia
- Phylum: Arthropoda
- Class: Insecta
- Order: Lepidoptera
- Family: Castniidae
- Genus: Zegara; Oiticica, 1955

Synonyms
- Doubledaya Buchecker, [1876]

= Zegara =

Genus of moths

Zegara is a genus of moths within the family Castniidae. It was described by Oiticica in 1955.

== Species ==
- Zegara personata (Walker, [1865])
- Zegara zagraea (Felder, 1874)
