= Tosxampila =

Scientific classification
- Kingdom: Animalia
- Phylum: Arthropoda
- Class: Insecta
- Order: Lepidoptera
- Family: Castniidae
- Genus: Tosxampila; Oiticica, 1955

Synonyms
- Xanthospila Houlbert, 1918

Genus of moths

Tosxampila is a genus of moths within the family Castniidae.

== Species ==
- Tosxampila annae (Biedermann, 1935)
- Tosxampila mimica (Felder, 1874)
