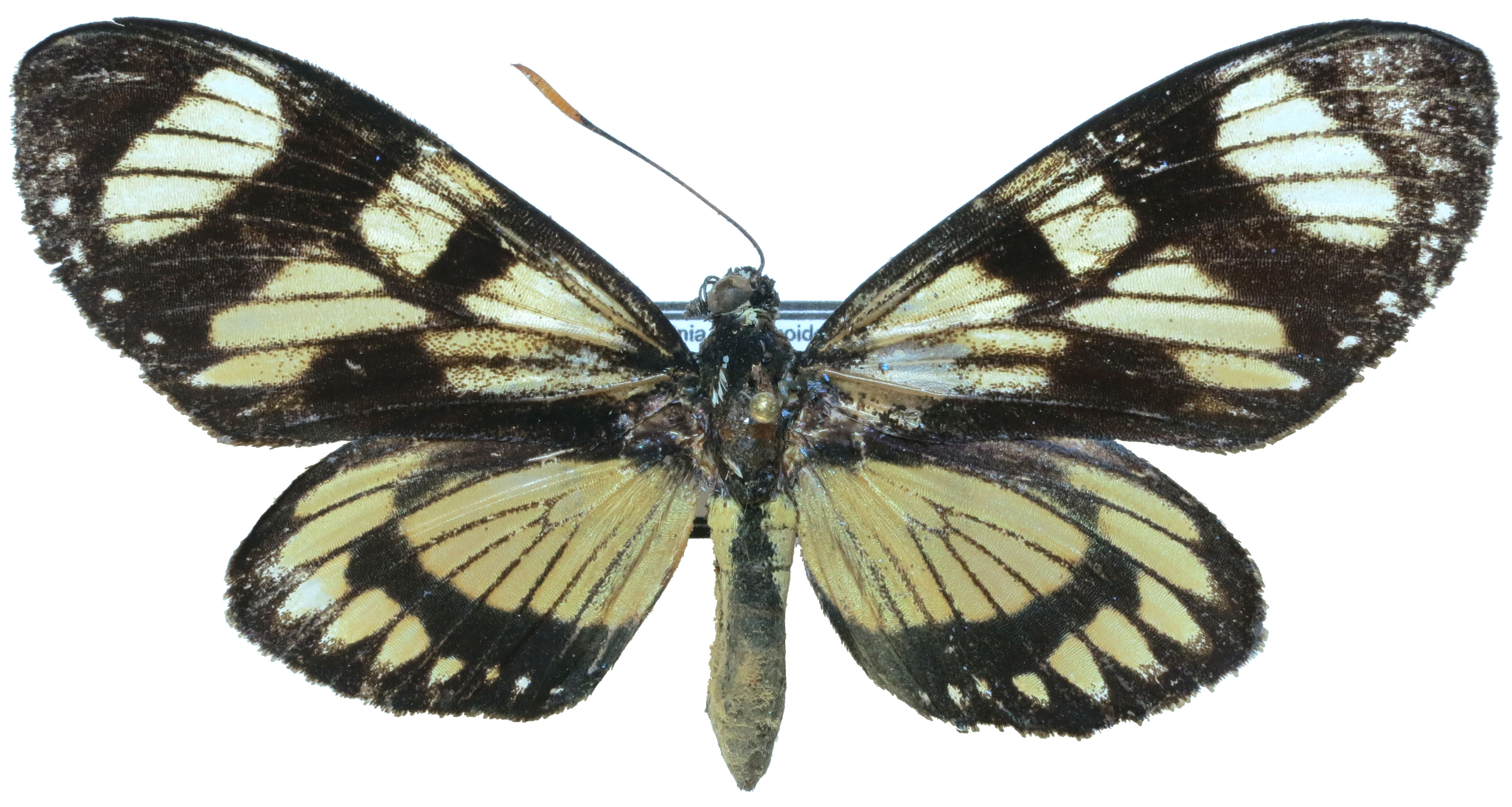
- Gazera heliconoides - Para, Brazil

Scientific classification
- Kingdom: Animalia
- Phylum: Arthropoda
- Class: Insecta
- Order: Lepidoptera
- Family: Castniidae
- Genus: Gazera; Herrich-Schäffer, [1853]
- Species: G. heliconioides

Binomial name
- Gazera heliconioides Herrich-Schäffer, [1853]

= Gazera =

Genus of moths

Gazera is a genus of moths within the family Castniidae. It was described by Gottlieb August Wilhelm Herrich-Schäffer in 1853, and contains the single species Gazera heliconioides. It is known from Brazil, Peru, Ecuador, Guyana, and French Guiana.

== Subspecies ==
- Gazera heliconioides heliconioides
- Gazera heliconioides dodona
- Gazera heliconioides fassli
- Gazera heliconioides obidona
- Gazera heliconioides micha
