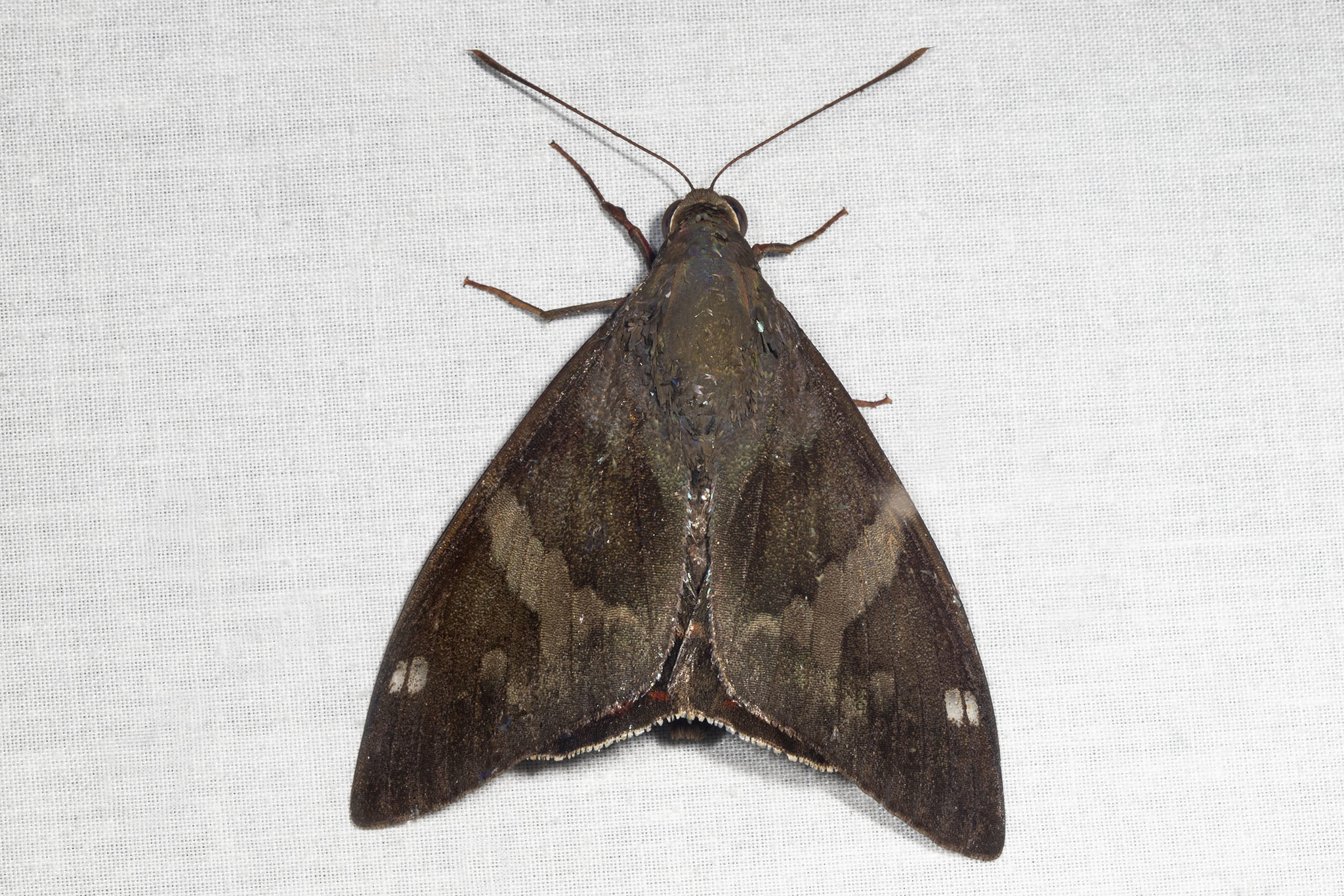

Scientific classification
- Kingdom: Animalia
- Phylum: Arthropoda
- Clade: Pancrustacea
- Class: Insecta
- Order: Lepidoptera
- Family: Castniidae
- Genus: Corybantes; Hübner, [1819]

= Corybantes (moth) =

Genus of moths

Corybantes is a genus of moths within the family Castniidae. It was described by Jacob Hübner in 1819.

== Species ==
- Corybantes delopia (Druce, 1907)
- Corybantes mathani (Oberthür, 1881)
- Corybantes pylades (Stoll, [1782])
- Corybantes veraguana (Westwood, 1877)
