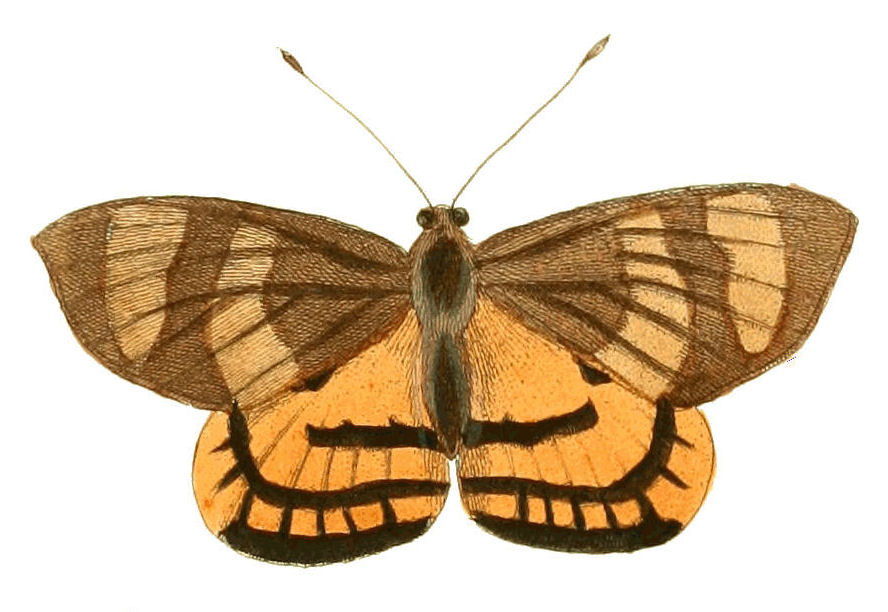
- Ceretes thais

Scientific classification
- Domain: Eukaryota
- Kingdom: Animalia
- Phylum: Arthropoda
- Class: Insecta
- Order: Lepidoptera
- Family: Castniidae
- Genus: Ceretes; Schaufuss, 1870

= Ceretes =

Genus of moths

Ceretes is a genus of moths within the family Castniidae. It was described by Schaufuss in 1870.

== Species ==
- Ceretes marcelserres (Godart, [1824])
- Ceretes thais (Drury, 1782)
