= Lapaeumides =

Scientific classification
- Kingdom: Animalia
- Phylum: Arthropoda
- Class: Insecta
- Order: Lepidoptera
- Family: Castniidae
- Genus: Lapaeumides; Oiticica, 1955

Genus of moths

Lapaeumides is a genus of moths within the family Castniidae.

== Species ==
- Lapaeumides actor (Dalman, 1824)
- Lapaeumides ctesiphon (Hübner, [1820])
- Lapaeumides zerynthia (Gray, 1838)
