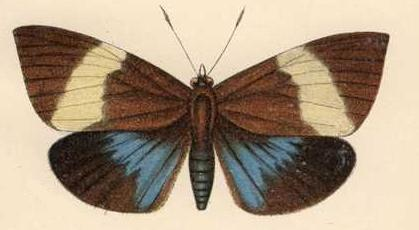

Scientific classification
- Kingdom: Animalia
- Phylum: Arthropoda
- Class: Insecta
- Order: Lepidoptera
- Family: Castniidae
- Genus: Tascina
- Species: T. nicevillei

Binomial name
- Tascina nicevillei (Hampson, 1895)

Synonyms
- Neocastnia nicevillei Hampson, 1895

= Tascina nicevillei =

Species of moth

Tascina nicevillei is a moth in the Castniidae family. It is found in the Tanintharyi Region of southern Myanmar.
