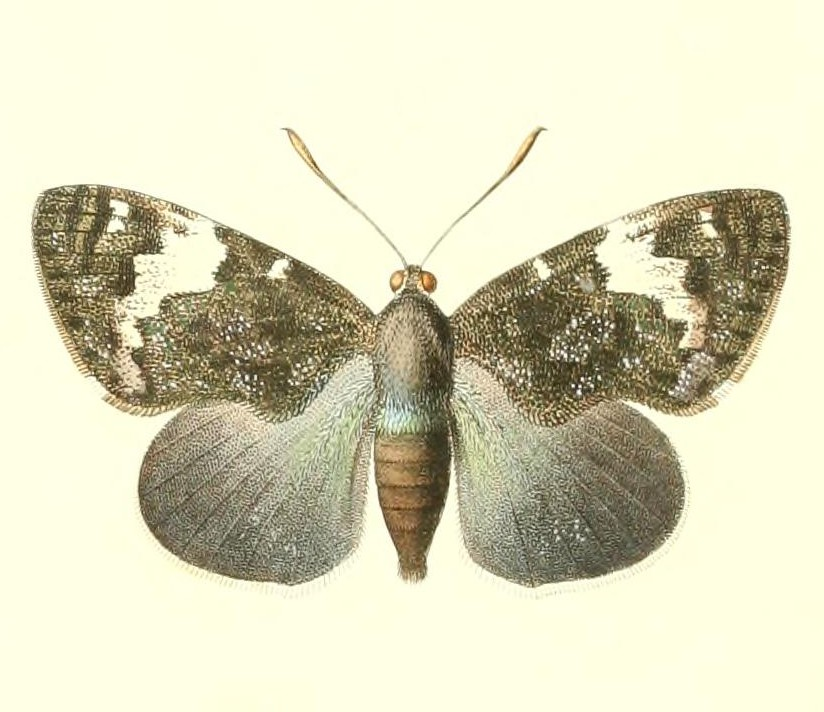
- Feschaeria meditrina

Scientific classification
- Domain: Eukaryota
- Kingdom: Animalia
- Phylum: Arthropoda
- Class: Insecta
- Order: Lepidoptera
- Family: Castniidae
- Genus: Feschaeria; Oiticica, 1955

Synonyms
- Schaefferia Houlbert, 1918 (preocc. not Absoalon, 1900)

= Feschaeria =

Genus of moths

Feschaeria is a genus of moths within the Castniidae family.

== Selected species ==
- Feschaeria amycus (Cramer, [1779])
- Feschaeria meditrina Hopffer, 1856
