= Frostetola =

Scientific classification
- Kingdom: Animalia
- Phylum: Arthropoda
- Class: Insecta
- Order: Lepidoptera
- Family: Castniidae
- Genus: Frostetola; Oiticica, 1955
- Species: F. gramivora

Binomial name
- Frostetola gramivora (Schaus, 1896)

Synonyms
- Tephrostola; Castnia gramivora; Castnia f. parana; Tephrostola fenestrata

Genus of moths

Frostetola is a genus of moth within the family Castniidae. It was described by José Oiticica Filho in 1955, and contains the single species Frostetola gramivora. It is known from Brazil.
