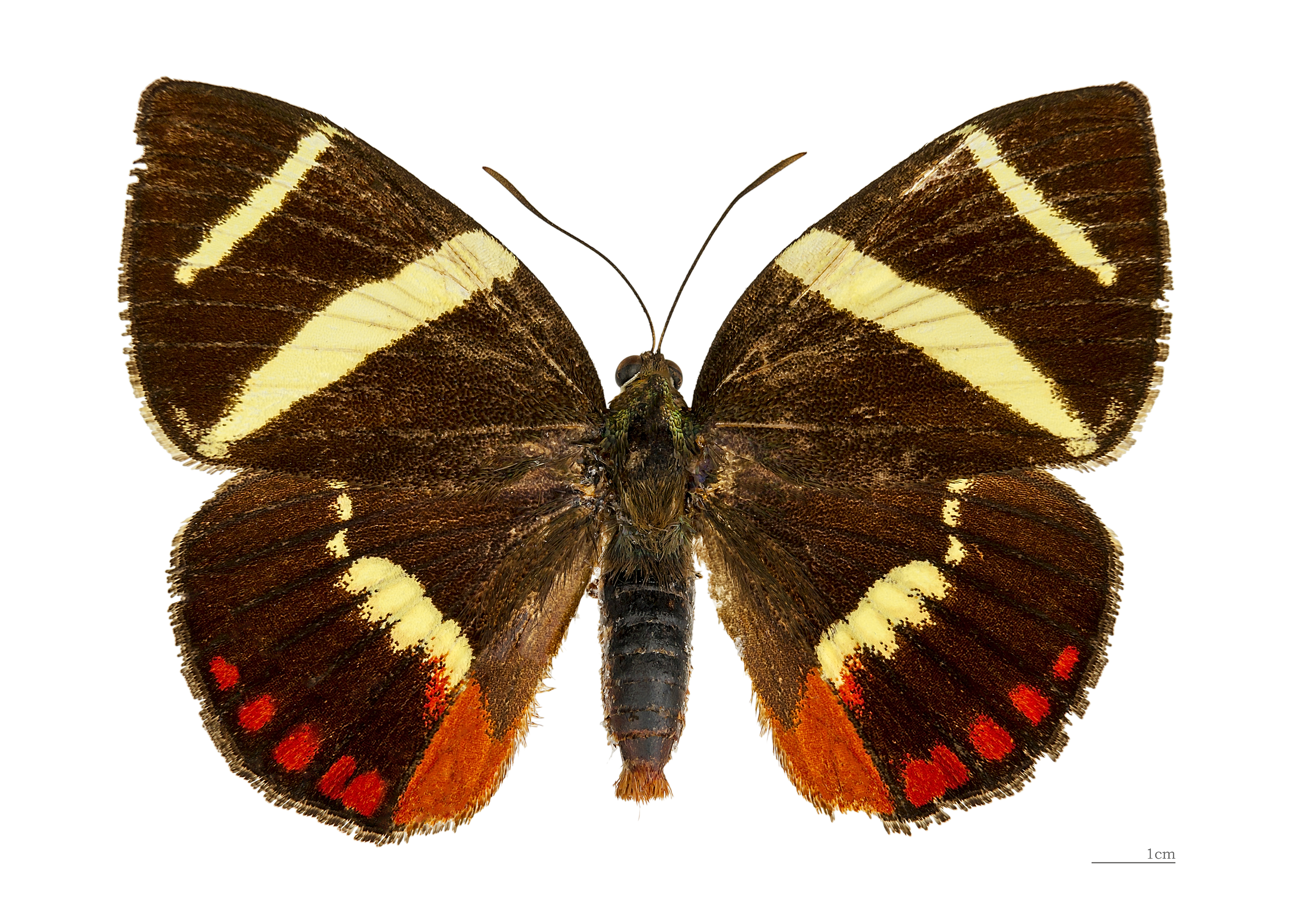
- Xanthocastnia evalthe in MHNT (back)
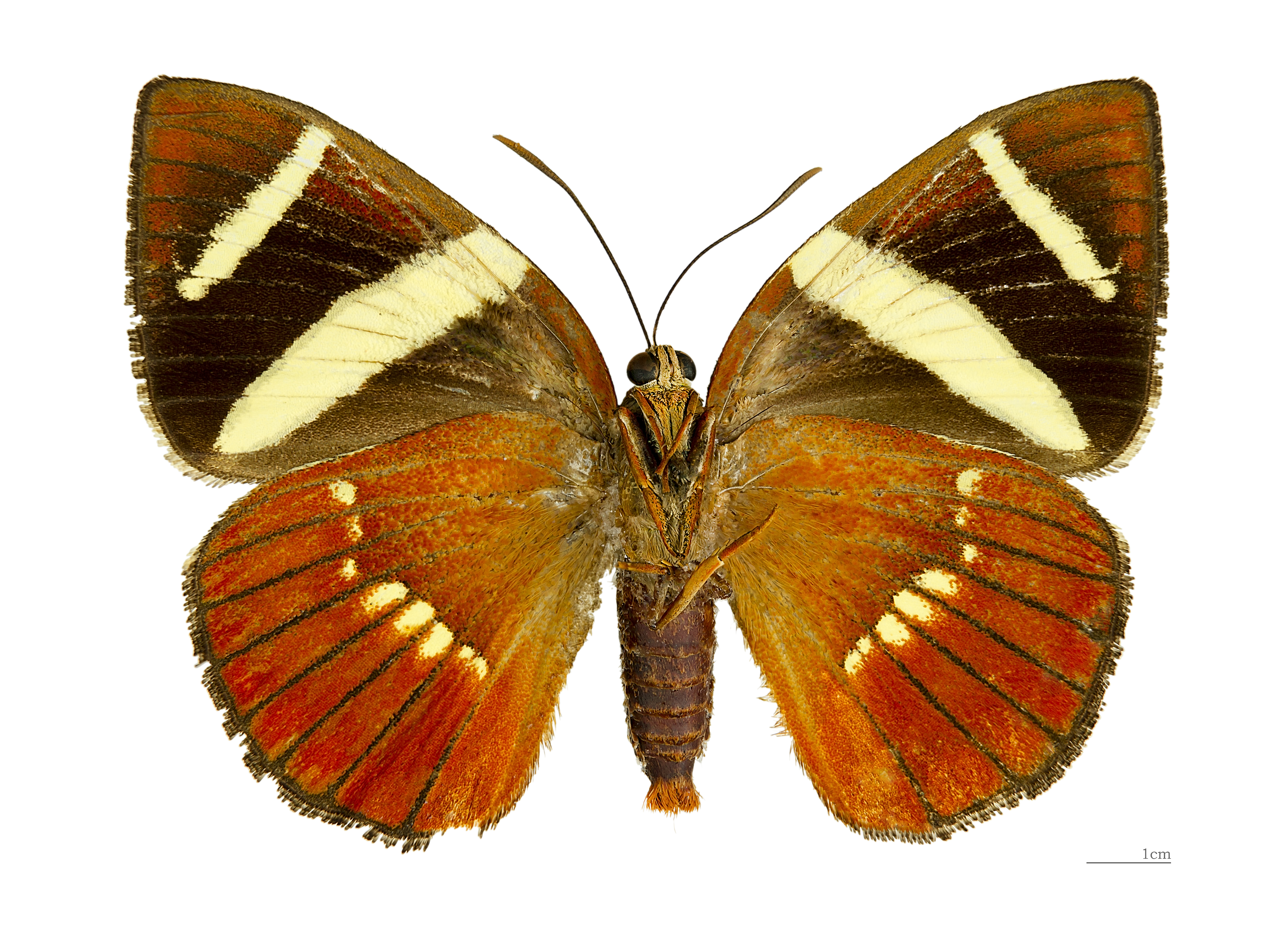
- Xanthocastnia evalthe in MHNT (front)

Scientific classification
- Kingdom: Animalia
- Phylum: Arthropoda
- Class: Insecta
- Order: Lepidoptera
- Family: Castniidae
- Genus: Xanthocastnia; Houlbert, 1918
- Species: X. evalthe

Binomial name
- Xanthocastnia evalthe (Fabricius, 1775)

Synonyms
- Genus: Euphrosyne Buchecker, [1876]; Species: Papilio evalthe Fabricius, 1775; Papilio dardanus Cramer, [1775]; Castnia evaltheformis Houlbert, 1917; Castnia euphrosyne Perty, [1833]; Euphrosyne pertyi Buchecker, [1876]; Castnia euphrosyne anerythra Rothschild, 1919; Castnia evalthoides Strand, 1913; Castnia quadrata Rothschild, 1919; Castnia vicina Houlbert, 1917; Castnia vicinoides Hopp, 1925; Castnia viryi Boisduval, [1875]; Corybanthes wagneri Buchecker, [1880]; Castnia evalthonida Houlbert, 1917; Castnia evalthonida var. flexifasciata Houlbert, 1917

= Xanthocastnia =

Genus of moths

Xanthocastnia is a genus of moths within the family Castniidae containing only one species, Xanthocastnia evalthe, which is widespread in the Neotropical realm, ranging from southern Mexico to southern Brazil.

Adults are day-flying.

== Subspecies ==
- Xanthocastnia evalthe evalthe (Suriname)
- Xanthocastnia evalthe cuyabensis Lathy, 1922 (Brazil)
- Xanthocastnia evalthe euphrosyne (Perty, 1833) (Brazil)
- Xanthocastnia evalthe evalthoides (Strand, 1913) (Bolivia)
- Xanthocastnia evalthe quadrata (Rothschild, 1919) (Peru)
- Xanthocastnia evalthe vicina (Houlbert, 1917) (Ecuador)
- Xanthocastnia evalthe vicinoides (Hopp, 1925) (Colombia)
- Xanthocastnia evalthe viryi (Boisduval, [1875]) (Mexico)
- Xanthocastnia evalthe wagneri (Buchecker, [1880]) (Colombia)
- Xanthocastnia evalthe tica Lamas, 1995 (Costa Rica)
