= Castnius =

Scientific classification
- Kingdom: Animalia
- Phylum: Arthropoda
- Clade: Pancrustacea
- Class: Insecta
- Order: Lepidoptera
- Family: Castniidae
- Genus: Castnius; Hübner, [1819]

Synonyms
- Nasca Houlbert, 1918; Enicospila Houlbert, 1918

Genus of moths

Castnius is a genus of moths within the family Castniidae. It was described by Jacob Hübner in 1819.

== Species ==
- Castnius marcus (Jordan, 1908)
- Castnius pelasgus (Cramer, [1779])
- Castnius asteropoides Porion, 2004
