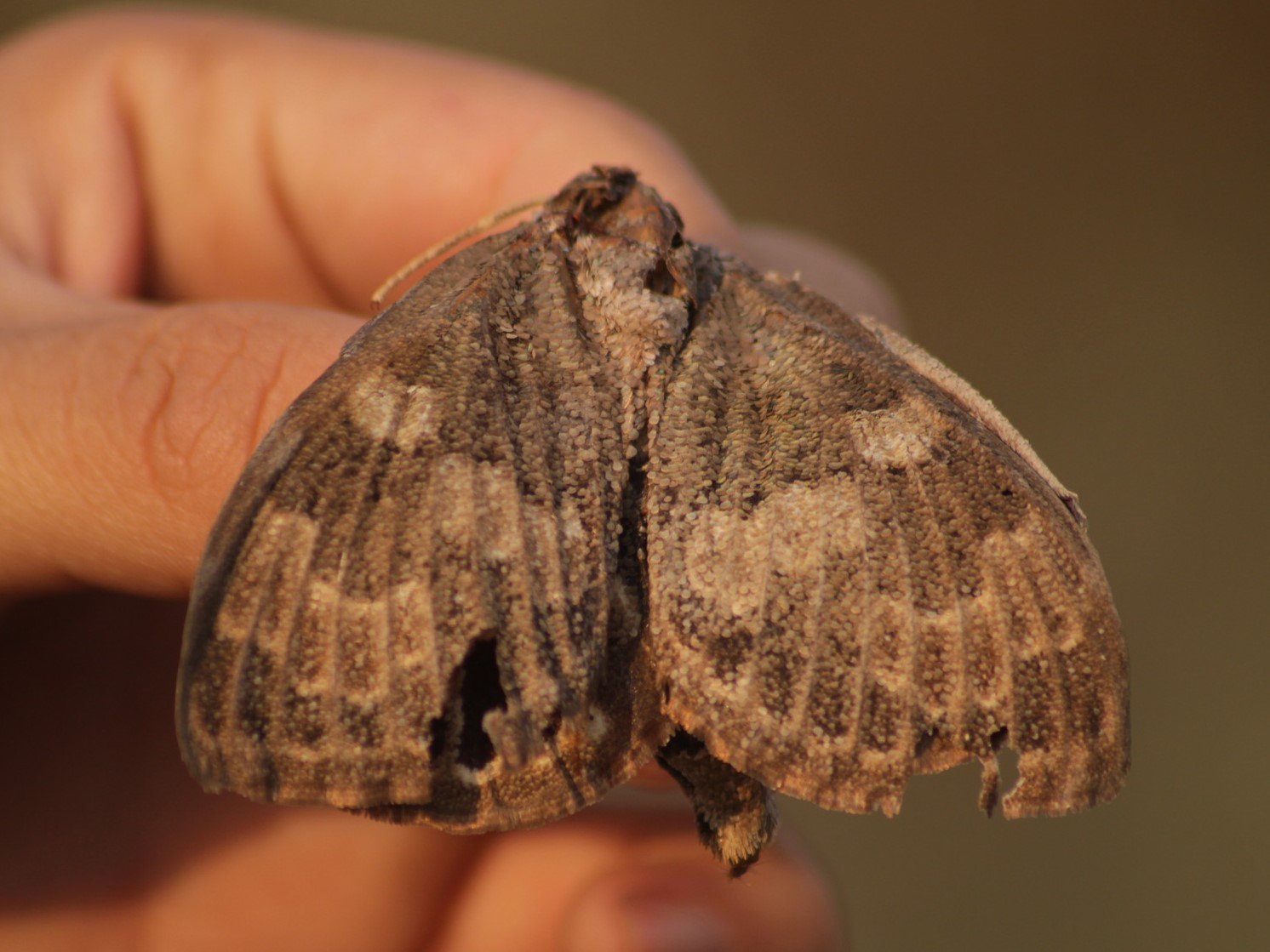

Scientific classification
- Kingdom: Animalia
- Phylum: Arthropoda
- Class: Insecta
- Order: Lepidoptera
- Family: Castniidae
- Genus: Escalantiana
- Species: E. escalantei

Binomial name
- Escalantiana escalantei (Miller, 1976)

Synonyms
- Castnia escalantei Miller, 1976; Synpalamides escalantei (Miller, 1976)

= Escalantiana escalantei =

Species of moth

Escalantiana escalantei is a species of moth in the family Castniidae. It was first described by Jacqueline Y. Miller in 1976, and is known from Mexico.

The length of the forewings 40–45 mm for males and 55–58 mm for females.
