= Tascina metallica =

Scientific classification
- Domain: Eukaryota
- Kingdom: Animalia
- Phylum: Arthropoda
- Class: Insecta
- Order: Lepidoptera
- Family: Castniidae
- Genus: Tascina
- Species: T. metallica

Binomial name
- Tascina metallica Pagenstecher, 1890

Species of moth

Tascina metallica is a moth in the Castniidae family. It is found on Borneo and Palawan.
