= Haemonides =

Scientific classification
- Kingdom: Animalia
- Phylum: Arthropoda
- Clade: Pancrustacea
- Class: Insecta
- Order: Lepidoptera
- Family: Castniidae
- Subfamily: Castniinae
- Genus: Haemonides; Hübner, [1819]

Genus of moths

Haemonides is a genus of moths within the family Castniidae.

== Species ==
- Haemonides candida (Houlbert, 1917)
- Haemonides cronida (Herrich-Schäffer, [1854])
- Haemonides cronis (Cramer, [1775])
