= Hista =

Scientific classification
- Kingdom: Animalia
- Phylum: Arthropoda
- Class: Insecta
- Order: Lepidoptera
- Family: Castniidae
- Genus: Hista; Oiticica, 1955

Genus of moths

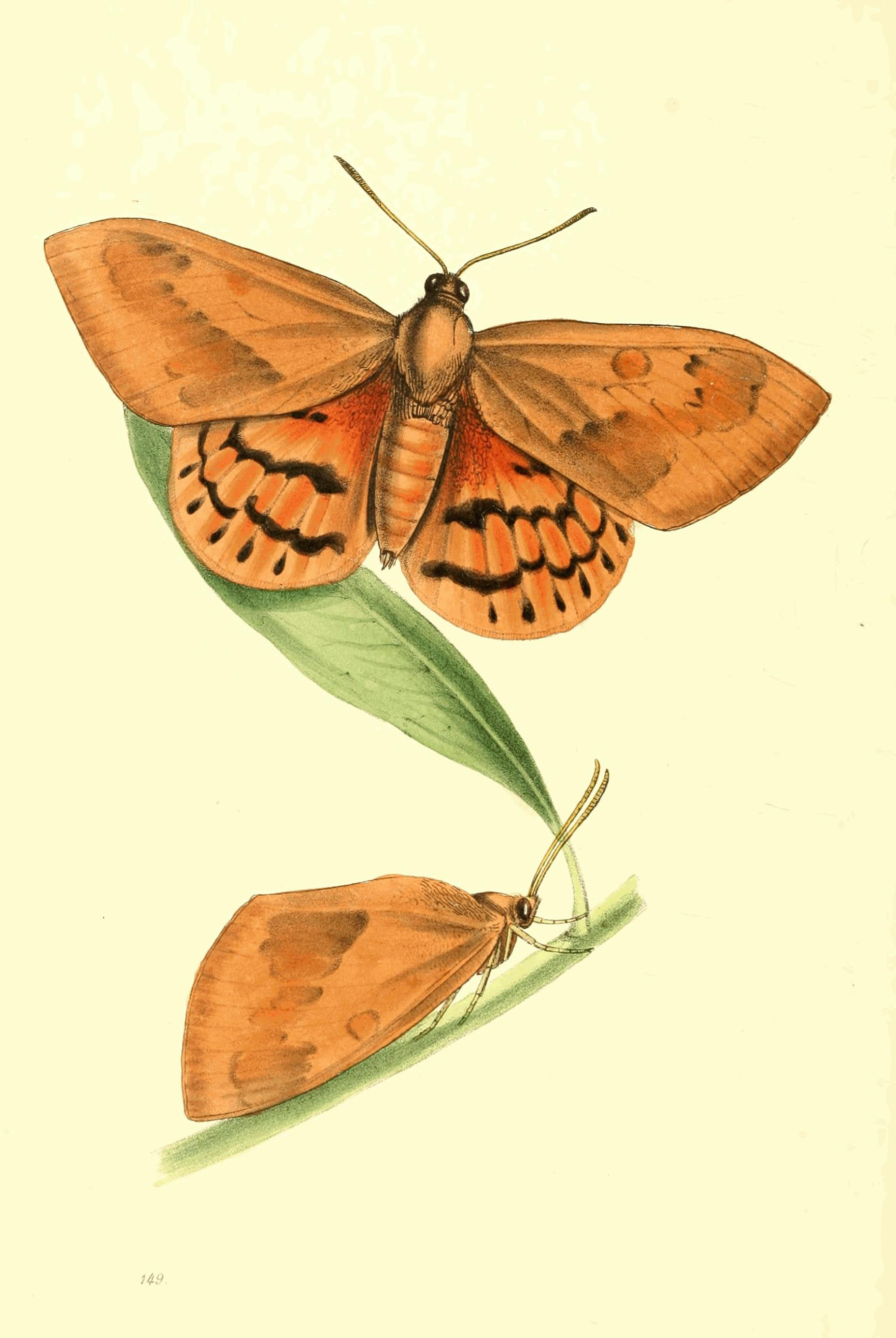

Hista is a genus of moths within the family Castniidae.

== Species ==
- Hista fabricii (Swainson, 1823)
- Hista hegemon (Kollar, 1839)
