= Insigniocastnia =

Scientific classification
- Kingdom: Animalia
- Phylum: Arthropoda
- Class: Insecta
- Order: Lepidoptera
- Family: Castniidae
- Genus: Insigniocastnia; Miller, 2007
- Species: I. taisae

Binomial name
- Insigniocastnia taisae Miller, 2007

Genus of moths

Insigniocastnia is a genus of moths within the family Castniidae containing only one species, Insigniocastnia taisae, which is found in Ecuador.

The length of the forewings is 17.5-24.3 mm.
