= Prometheus (moth) =

Scientific classification
- Kingdom: Animalia
- Phylum: Arthropoda
- Clade: Pancrustacea
- Class: Insecta
- Order: Lepidoptera
- Family: Castniidae
- Genus: Prometheus; Hübner, 1824

Genus of moths

Prometheus is a genus of moths within the family Castniidae. It was described by Jacob Hübner in 1824

== Taxonomy ==
Prometheus contains the following species:

- Prometheus annae (Bierdemann, 1935)
- Prometheus cochrus (Fabricius, 1787)
- Prometheus cononia (Westwood, 1877) [see Castnia mars Druce, 1883 (?)]
- Prometheus ecuadoria (Westwood, 1877)
- Prometheus heliconioides (Herrich-Schäffer, [1853])
- Prometheus mimica (R. Felder, 1874)
- Prometheus personata (Walker, [1865])
- Prometheus polymorpha (Miller, 2008)
- Prometheus simulans (Boisduval, [1875])
- Prometheus zagraea (R. Felder, 1874)
