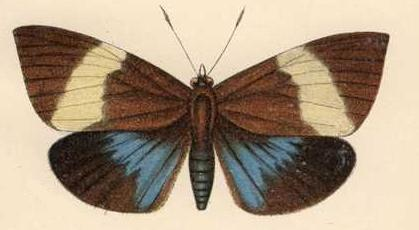
- Tascina nicevillei

Scientific classification
- Kingdom: Animalia
- Phylum: Arthropoda
- Class: Insecta
- Order: Lepidoptera
- Family: Castniidae
- Subfamily: Tascininae
- Genus: Tascina; Westwood, 1877

Synonyms
- Neocastnia Hampson, 1895

= Tascina =

Genus of moths

Tascina is a genus of moths within the Castniidae family. It is found in South East Asia.

== Selected species ==
- Tascina dalattensis Fukuda, 2000
- Tascina orientalis Westwood, 1877
- Tascina metallica Pagenstecher, 1890
- Tascina nicevillei (Hampson, 1895)
