= Oiticicastnia =

Scientific classification
- Kingdom: Animalia
- Phylum: Arthropoda
- Class: Insecta
- Order: Lepidoptera
- Family: Castniidae
- Genus: Oiticicastnia; Lamas, 1995
- Species: O. erycina

Binomial name
- Oiticicastnia erycina (Westwood, 1881)

Synonyms
- Castnia erycina Westwood, 1881; Cyerina erycina; Castnia hyperbius Westwood, 1881 (nom. nud.); Castnia pelopioides Houlbert, 1917

Genus of moths

Oiticicastnia is a genus of moths within the family Castniidae which contains only one species, Oiticicastnia erycina, which is found in Ecuador and French Guiana.
