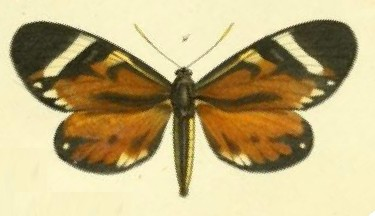
- Duboisvalia simulans

Scientific classification
- Domain: Eukaryota
- Kingdom: Animalia
- Phylum: Arthropoda
- Class: Insecta
- Order: Lepidoptera
- Family: Castniidae
- Genus: Duboisvalia; Oiticica, 1955

= Duboisvalia =

Genus of moths

Duboisvalia is a genus of moths within the family Castniidae. It was described by Oiticica in 1955.

== Species ==
- Duboisvalia cononia (Westwood, 1877)
- Duboisvalia ecuadoria (Westwood, 1877)
- Duboisvalia simulans (Boisduval, [1875])
