= Riechia =

Scientific classification
- Domain: Eukaryota
- Kingdom: Animalia
- Phylum: Arthropoda
- Class: Insecta
- Order: Lepidoptera
- Family: Oecophoridae
- Tribe: Oecophorini
- Genus: Riechia; Oiticica, 1955
- Species: R. acraeoides

Binomial name
- Riechia acraeoides (Guérin-Méneville, [1832])

Synonyms
- Genus: Herrichia Buchecker, [1876]; Species: Castnia acraeoides Guérin-Méneville, [1832]; Castnia actinophorus Kollar, 1839; Castnia f. nervosa Strand, 1913; Castnia jörgenseni Breyer, 1933; Herrichia diffusa Lathy, 1923

Genus of moths

Riechia is a genus of moths within the family Castniidae containing only one species, Riechia acraeoides, which is found in Peru, Paraguay, Brazil and Argentina.

== Subspecies ==
- Riechia acraeoides acraeoides (Peru, Brazil, Argentina)
- Riechia acraeoides diffusa (Lathy, 1923) (Brazil)
