= Constant Vincent Houlbert =

French entomologist

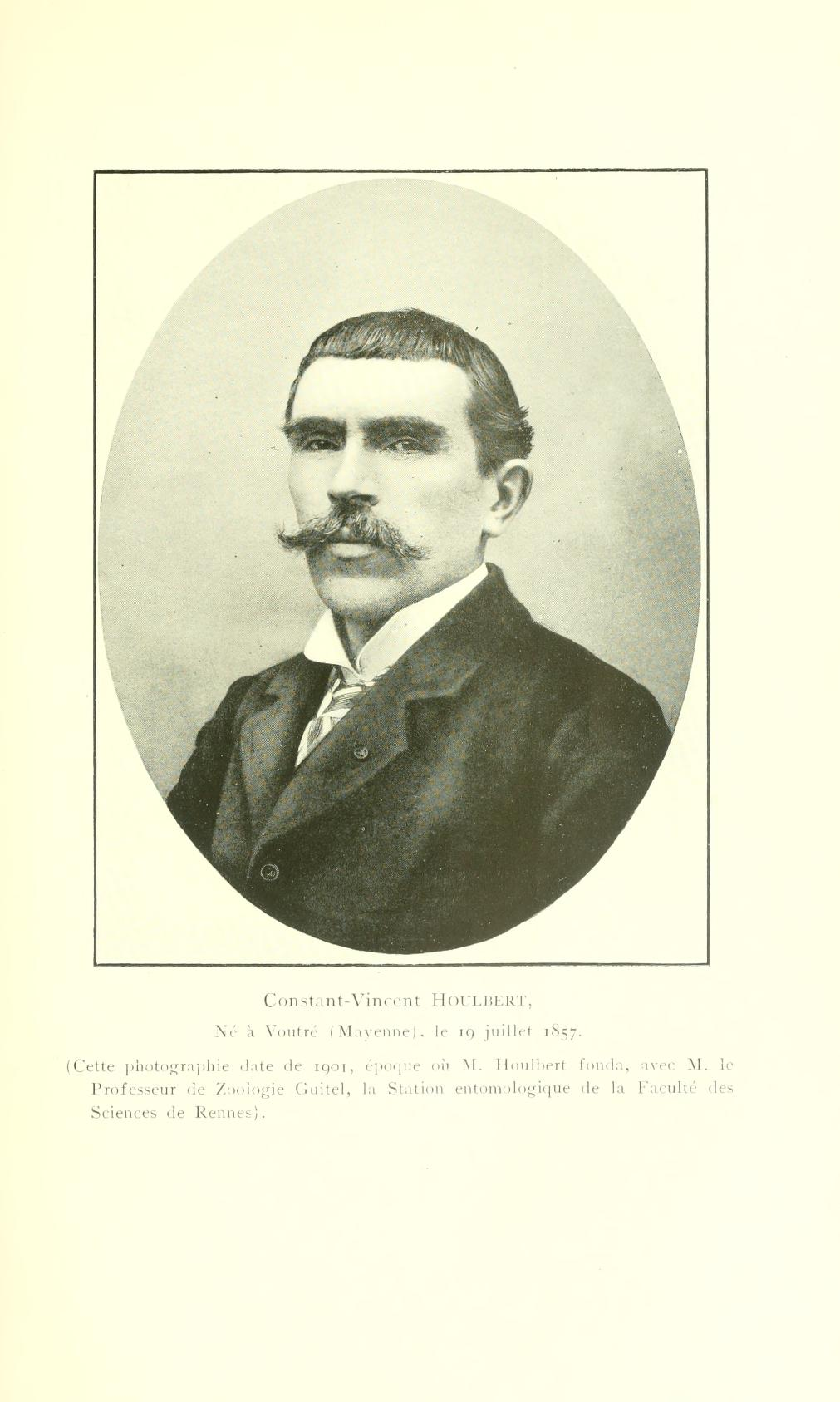
Constant-Vincent Houlbert

Constant Vincent Houlbert (18 July 1857 in Voutré en Mayenne – 22 December 1947 in Rennes) was a French entomologist who specialised in Lepidoptera and Coleoptera.

He was a conservator at the Museum in Rennes and later Professor in the School of Medicine and Pharmacy at the University of Rennes. He wrote with René Oberthür Lucanides de Java. Insecta; revue illustree d’Entomologie, Rennes (1912–1914), Tableaux génériques illustrés des Coléoptères de France. Rennes (1912), various parts of Faune entomologique armoricaine with Eugène Monnot and many other works.
