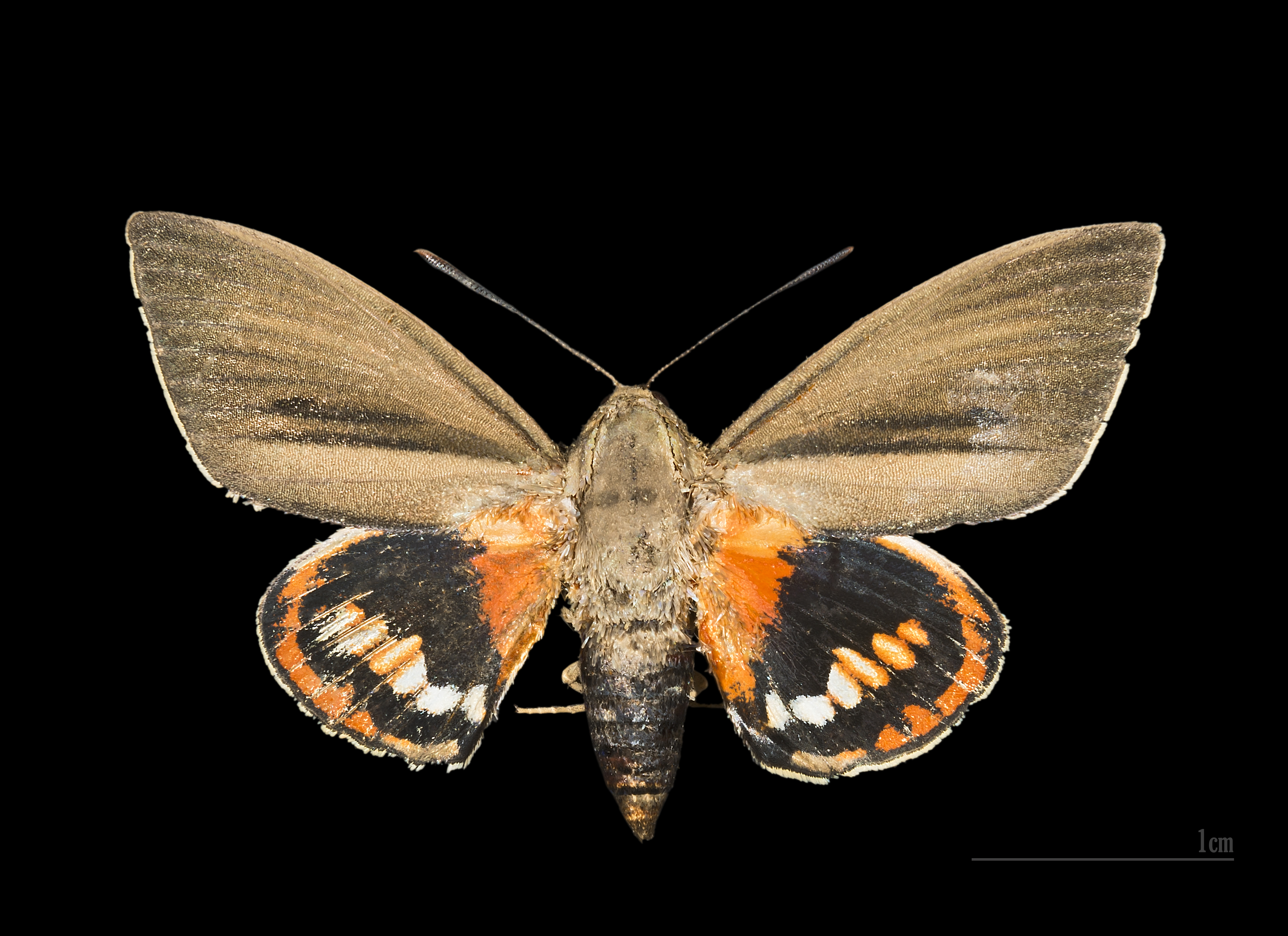
- Paysandisia archon

Scientific classification
- Domain: Eukaryota
- Kingdom: Animalia
- Phylum: Arthropoda
- Class: Insecta
- Order: Lepidoptera
- Superfamily: Cossoidea
- Family: Castniidae; Boisduval, 1828

Subfamilies and genera
- See text

= Castniidae =

Giant butterfly-moths and sun moths

Family of moths

Castniidae, or castniid moths, is a small family of moths with fewer than 200 species: The majority are Neotropical with some in Australia and a few in south-east Asia. These are medium-sized to very large moths, usually with drab, cryptically marked forewings and brightly coloured hindwings. They have clubbed antennae and are day flying, and are often mistaken for butterflies. Indeed, some previous classification systems placed this family within the butterflies or skippers. The Neotropical species are commonly known as giant butterfly-moths, the Australian and Asian species as sun moths. The larvae are internal feeders, often on roots of epiphytes or on monocotyledons.

== Taxonomy ==
Subfamily Castniinae

- Tribe Castniini
  - Amauta
  - Athis
  - Castnia
  - Castniomera
  - Corybantes
  - Eupalamides
  - Feschaeria
  - Geyeria
  - Haemonides
  - Hista
  - Imara
  - Insigniocastnia
  - Ircila
  - Lapaeumides
  - Spilopastes
  - Synpalamides
  - Telchin
  - Xanthocastnia
  - Yagra
- Tribe Gazerini
  - Castnius
  - Ceretes
  - Divana
  - Duboisvalia
  - Frostetola
  - Gazera
  - Mirocastnia
  - Oiticicastnia
  - Paysandisia
  - Prometheus
  - Riechia
  - Tosxampila
  - Zegara
- Tribe Synemonini
  - Synemon

Subfamily Tascininae

- Tascina

Subfamily incertae sedis

- †Dominickus
