= List of coconut pests =

Non-exhaustive list of coconut tree pests (Cocos nucifera)

== Birds ==
- Solomons corella Pucheran, Ducorps' cockatoo, Cacatuidae

== Mammals ==
- Rattus rattus Linnaeus, Muridae
- Pteropus spp. Erxleben, flying foxes, Pteropodidae

== Insects ==
=== Beetles ===
- Apogonia cribricollis Burmeister, Melolonthidae
- Brontispa longissima Gestro, bronstipe or hispine of the coconut palm Chrysomelidae
- Brontispa mariana Spaeth Chrysomelidae
- Brontispa limbata Waterhouse Chrysomelidae
- Coelaenomenodera elaidis Maulik Hispidae
- Diocalandra taitensis Guérin, Dryophthoridae
- Diocalandra frumenti Fabricius, Dryophthoridae
- Homalinotus coriaceus Gyllenhal, Curculionidae
- Leucopholis coneophora Burmeister, Melolonthidae
- Melitomma insulare Fairmaire, Lymexylonidae
- Oryctes rhinoceros Linnaeus, Dynastidae
- Oryctes monoceros Olivier, Dynastidae
- Plesispa reichei Chapuis, Chrysomelidae
- Promecotheca coeruleipennis Blanchard, Chrysomelidae
- Promecotheca papuana Csiki, Chrysomelidae
- Promecotheca opacicollis Gestro, Chrysomelidae
- Promecotheca cumingi Baly, Chrysomelidae
- Rhabdoscelus obscurus Boisduval, Curculionidae
- Rhinostomus barbirostris Fabricius, Dryophthoridae
- Rhinostomus afzelii Fåhraeus, Dryophthoridae
- Rhynchophorus ferrugineus Olivier, red palm weevil Curculionidae
- Rhynchophorus schach Olivier, Curculionidae
- Rhynchophorus papuanus Kirsch, Curculionidae
- Rhynchophorus palmarum, Linnaeus palm weevil, Curculionidae
- Rhynchophorus phoenici Fabricius, Curculionidae
- Sparganobasis subcruciatus Marshall, Dryophthoridae
- Xyleborus perforans Wollaston, Scolytidae

=== Hemiptera ===
- Aonidiella aurantii Maskell, California louse, Coccidae
- *Aspidiotus destructor* Signoret, transparent coconut scale, coconut louse, Coccidae
- *Chrysomphalus ficus* Ashmead, red scale, Coccidae
- *Eucalymnatus tesselatus* Signoret, greenhouse scale, Coccidae
- *Ischnaspis longirostris* Signoret, long-row scale, Coccidae
- Pinnaspis buxi* Bouché, long-row scale, Coccidae

=== Hymenoptera ===
- *Azteca cartifex* Forel Formicidae
- *Dorylus orientalis* Westwood Formicidae
- Oecophylla smaragdina Fabricius, weaver ant Formicidae

=== Isoptera ===
- Coptotermes curvignathus Holmgren, Rhinotermitidae
- Microtermes biroi Desneux, Termitidae
- Neotermes rainbowi Hill, Kalotermitidae

=== Lepidoptera ===
- Acanthopsyche hypoleuca Hapson and A cana Hampson, Psychidae
- Acritocera negligens Butler, Cossidae
- Agonoxena argaula Meyrick, Elachistidae
- Amathusia phidippus Linnaeus, Nymphalidae
- Batrachedra arenosella Walker, Batrachedridae
- Batrachedra peroptusa Meyrick, Batrachedridae
- Brachartona catoxantha Hampson, Zygaenidae
- Brassolis sophorae Linnaeus, Nymphalidae
- Brassolis astyra Goadrt, Nymphalidae
- Cadra cautella Walker, Pyralidae
- Castnia daedalus Cramer, Castniidae
- Castnia licus Drury, Castniidae
- Chalcocelis albiguttata Snellen, Limacodidae
- Chalconycles catori Jordan, Zygaenidae
- Cyclodes omma van der Hoeven, Noctuidae
- Contheyla rotunda Hampson, Limacodidae
- Elymnias hypermnestra Linnaeus, Nymphalidae
- Gangara thyrsis Fabricius Hesperiidae
- Omiodes blackburni (Butler), Crambidae
- Hidari irava Moore & Horsfield, Hesperiidae
- Atheloca subrufella (Hulst), Pyralidae
- Levuana iridescens Bethune-Baker, Zygaenidae
- Mabasena corbetti Tams, Psychidae
- Macroplectra nararia Moore, Limacodidae
- Nephantis serinopa Meyrick, Autostichidae
- Parasa lepida Cramer, Limacodidae
- Pimelephila ghesquieri Tams, Crambidae
- Setora nitens Walker, Limacodidae
- Telicota palamarum Moore, Hesperiidae
- Tirathaba complexa Butler, Pyralidae
- Tirathaba mundella Walker, Pyralidae
- Tirathaba rufivena Walker, Pyralidae

=== Orthoptera ===
- Aularches miliaris Linnaeus, Acrididae
- Cardiodactylus novae-guinae Haan, Gryllidae
- Graeffea crouani Le Guillou, Phasmatidae
- Locusta migratoria manilensis Meyen, Acrididae
- Locusta migratoria migratoroides Reiche & Fermaire, Acrididae
- Nomadacris septemfasciata Serville, Acrididae
- Oxya chinensis Thunberg, Acrididae
- Schistocerca gregaria Forsskål, Acrididae
- Sexava spp. , Tettigoniidae
- Tropidacris cristata Linnaeus, Acrididae
- Tropidacris dux Drury, Acrididae
- Valanga nigricornis Burmeister, Acrididae

== Phasmoptera ==
- Graeffea crouani Le Guillou, Phasmatidae
- Graeffea seychellensis Ferrari, Phasmatidae
- Ophicrania leveri Günther, Phasmatidae

== Crustaceans ==
- Birgus latro Linnaeus, coconut crab Paguridae

== Mites ==
- Aceria guerreronis Keifer, coconut mite, Eriophyidae
- Raoiella indica Hirst, Tenuipalpidae
- Tetranychus fijiensis Hirst, Tetranychidae

== Nematodes ==
- Bursaphelenchus cocophilus Cobb, Tylenchidae

== See also ==
- List of coconut palm diseases
