= Giant grasshopper =

Giant grasshopper can refer to:

- Tropidacris, the giant South and Central American grasshoppers
- Valanga irregularis, the Australian giant grasshopper
- Shore Road Pumping Station, a name for one of the beam engines at this station Birkenhead, England
