= Coconut moth =

Coconut moth is a common name for several kinds of moth whose larvae are known to feed on the coconut palm. These include:

- Batrachedra arenosella, of Australasia
- Levuana iridescens or the levuana moth, an extinct moth of Fiji
- Atheloca subrufella, of the Americas
