= Brontispa depressa =

Scientific classification
- Kingdom: Animalia
- Phylum: Arthropoda
- Clade: Pancrustacea
- Class: Insecta
- Order: Coleoptera
- Suborder: Polyphaga
- Infraorder: Cucujiformia
- Family: Chrysomelidae
- Genus: Brontispa
- Species: B. depressa

Binomial name
- Brontispa depressa (Baly, 1858)

Synonyms
- Oxycephala depressa Baly, 1858

Species of beetle

Brontispa depressa is a species of beetle of the family Chrysomelidae. It is found in the Philippines (Luzon, Panay, Samar, Sibyan).

== Life history ==
The recorded host plants for this species are Normanbya merrillii and Arenga species.
