= Eupalamides geron =

Scientific classification
- Domain: Eukaryota
- Kingdom: Animalia
- Phylum: Arthropoda
- Class: Insecta
- Order: Lepidoptera
- Family: Castniidae
- Genus: Eupalamides
- Species: E. geron

Binomial name
- Eupalamides geron (Kollar, 1839)

Synonyms
- Castnia geron Kollar, 1839

Species of moth

Eupalamides geron is a moth in the Castniidae family. It is found in Brazil.
