= Plesispa hagensis =

Scientific classification
- Kingdom: Animalia
- Phylum: Arthropoda
- Clade: Pancrustacea
- Class: Insecta
- Order: Coleoptera
- Suborder: Polyphaga
- Infraorder: Cucujiformia
- Family: Chrysomelidae
- Genus: Plesispa
- Species: P. hagensis

Binomial name
- Plesispa hagensis Gressitt, 1960

Species of beetle

Plesispa hagensis is a species of beetle of the family Chrysomelidae. It is found in north-eastern New Guinea.

== Description ==
Adults reach a length of about 6.75 mm. They are pale ochraceous to pitchy black. The head is black, tinged with reddish anteriorly and pitchy reddish posteriorly and beneath. The antennae are black, tinged with pitchy red basally and with reddish brown on the distal area. The elytra are pitchy black, but reddish at the base.

== Life history ==
The recorded host plants for this species are Heterospathe species.
