= Brontispa palmivora =

Scientific classification
- Kingdom: Animalia
- Phylum: Arthropoda
- Clade: Pancrustacea
- Class: Insecta
- Order: Coleoptera
- Suborder: Polyphaga
- Infraorder: Cucujiformia
- Family: Chrysomelidae
- Genus: Brontispa
- Species: B. palmivora

Binomial name
- Brontispa palmivora Gressitt, 1963

Species of beetle

Brontispa palmivora is a species of beetle of the family Chrysomelidae. It is found in New Guinea.

== Description ==
Adults reach a length of about 7.5-8.5 mm. They are mostly pale testaceous, with brown to pitchy black areas. The head is ochraceous, with some darker areas on the neck and mouthparts. Segment 1 of the antennae is dark reddish brown, while the rest is pitchy black. The elytra are testaceous with brownish suture and a pale brown apex.

== Life history ==
The recorded host plants for this species are small palms (Arecaceae). The larvae and pupae have also been described. The larvae are pale orange testaceous and reach a length of about 9 mm, while the pupae are pale yellowish testaceous and are about 8.8 mm long.
