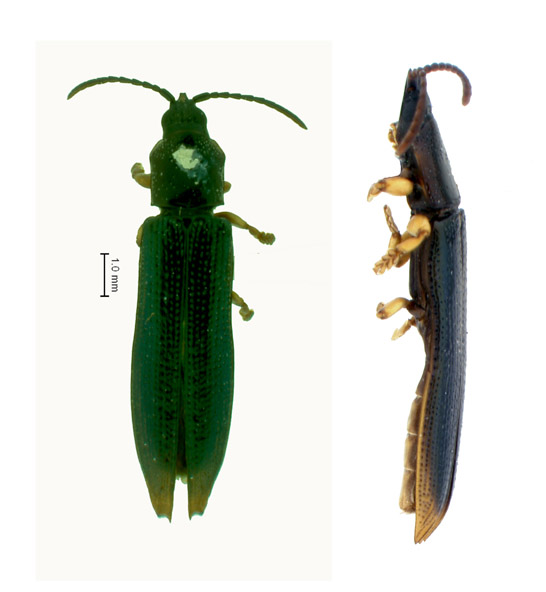

Scientific classification
- Kingdom: Animalia
- Phylum: Arthropoda
- Clade: Pancrustacea
- Class: Insecta
- Order: Coleoptera
- Suborder: Polyphaga
- Infraorder: Cucujiformia
- Family: Chrysomelidae
- Genus: Brontispa
- Species: B. chalybeipennis

Binomial name
- Brontispa chalybeipennis (Zacher, 1913)

Synonyms
- Oxycephala (Xiphispa) chalybeipennis Zacher, 1913; Brontispa namorikia Maulik, 1947

= Brontispa chalybeipennis =

Species of beetle

Brontispa chalybeipennis, the blue coconut leaf beetle, is a species of beetle of the family Chrysomelidae. It is found in Hawaii and Micronesia (Caroline Islands, Kosrae, Marshall Islands, Palau Islands, Ponape).

== Life history ==
The recorded host plants for this species are Cocos nucifera, Exorrhiza ponapensis and Pandanus species.
