= Brontispa =

- Brontispa longissima

Scientific classification
- Kingdom: Animalia
- Phylum: Arthropoda
- Clade: Pancrustacea
- Class: Insecta
- Order: Coleoptera
- Suborder: Polyphaga
- Infraorder: Cucujiformia
- Family: Chrysomelidae
- Subfamily: Cassidinae
- Tribe: Cryptonychini
- Genus: Brontispa; Sharp, 1903

Synonyms
- Oxycephala Baly, 1858 (preocc.); Planispa Chûjô, 1937

Genus of leaf beetles

Brontispa is a genus of beetles belonging to the family Chrysomelidae. This genus includes significant palm pest species and is recorded from South-East Asia, Australia and the Pacific islands.

== Species ==
- Brontispa archontophoenica Gressitt, 1960
- Brontispa balakae Gressitt, 1957
- Brontispa calami Gressitt, 1960
- Brontispa chalybeipennis (Zacher, 1913)
- Brontispa cyperaceae Gressitt, 1963
- Brontispa depressa (Baly, 1858)
- Brontispa eversi Gressitt, 1960
- Brontispa gleadowi Weise, 1905
- Brontispa lateralis Uhmann, 1953
- Brontispa limbata (Waterhouse, 1876)
- Brontispa linearis Spaeth, 1936
- Brontispa longissima (Gestro, 1885)
- Brontispa mariana Spaeth, 1937
- Brontispa minor Gressitt, 1957
- Brontispa norfolkensis Gressitt, 1960
- Brontispa palauensis (Esaki & Chûjô, 1943)
- Brontispa palmivora Gressitt, 1963
- Brontispa sacchari Gressitt, 1960
- Brontispa serricornis Gressitt, 1957
- Brontispa simonthomasi Gressitt, 1960
- Brontispa veitchiae Gressitt, 1960

== Selected former species ==
- Brontispa castaneipennis Chûjô, 1937
