= Eupalamides preissi =

Scientific classification
- Domain: Eukaryota
- Kingdom: Animalia
- Phylum: Arthropoda
- Class: Insecta
- Order: Lepidoptera
- Family: Castniidae
- Genus: Eupalamides
- Species: E. preissi

Binomial name
- Eupalamides preissi (Staudinger, 1899)

Synonyms
- Castnia preissi Staudinger, 1899 (replacement name for Castnia staudingeri); Castnia staudingeri Preiss, 1899 (preocc. Druce, 1896)

Species of moth

Eupalamides preissi is a moth in the Castniidae family. It is found in Peru.
