= Plesispa korthalsiae =

Scientific classification
- Kingdom: Animalia
- Phylum: Arthropoda
- Clade: Pancrustacea
- Class: Insecta
- Order: Coleoptera
- Suborder: Polyphaga
- Infraorder: Cucujiformia
- Family: Chrysomelidae
- Genus: Plesispa
- Species: P. korthalsiae

Binomial name
- Plesispa korthalsiae Gressitt, 1963

Species of beetle

Plesispa korthalsiae is a species of beetle of the family Chrysomelidae. It is found in south-eastern New Guinea.

== Description ==
Adults reach a length of about 6-6.8 mm. They are orange ochraceous to pitchy black, while the head is dark rusty brown, but paler reddish-brown at the side. The antennae are reddish brown basally, but pitchy black in the apical half. The pronotum is orange ochraceous and the elytra are pitchy black.

== Life history ==
The recorded host plants for this species are Korthalsia and Calamus species. The larvae have also been described. They have five eye-spots and both the head and pronotum are finely granulose.
