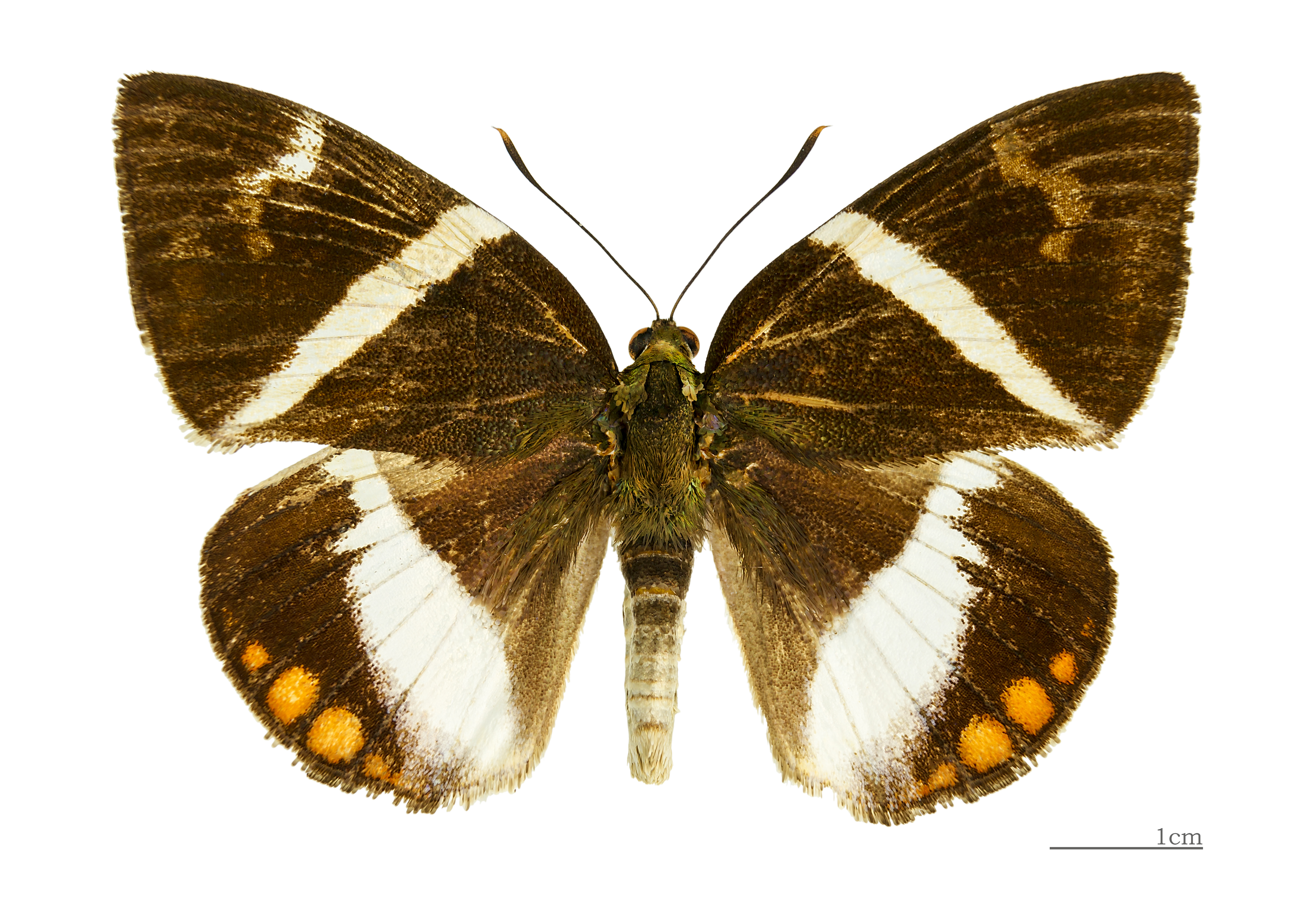
- Telchin licus - MHNT

Scientific classification
- Kingdom: Animalia
- Phylum: Arthropoda
- Clade: Pancrustacea
- Class: Insecta
- Order: Lepidoptera
- Family: Castniidae
- Genus: Telchin; Hübner, [1825]

Synonyms
- Graya Buchecker, [1876] (preocc.); Leucocastnia Houlbert, 1918; Erythrocastnia Houlbert, 1918

= Telchin =

Genus of moths

Telchin is a genus of moths within the family Castniidae.

== Species ==
- Telchin licus (Drury, 1773)
- Telchin syphax (Fabricius, 1775)

Castniomera atymnius is sometimes included in the genus Telchin.
