= Plesispa montana =

Scientific classification
- Kingdom: Animalia
- Phylum: Arthropoda
- Clade: Pancrustacea
- Class: Insecta
- Order: Coleoptera
- Suborder: Polyphaga
- Infraorder: Cucujiformia
- Family: Chrysomelidae
- Genus: Plesispa
- Species: P. montana

Binomial name
- Plesispa montana Gressitt, 1960

Species of beetle

Plesispa montana is a species of beetle of the family Chrysomelidae. It is found in central New Guinea.

== Description ==
Adults reach a length of about 8.9 mm. They are black to orange ochraceous. The head is black, but slightly reddish anteriorly and beneath. The antennae are black with a reddish tinge and the elytra are black, but slightly pitchy reddish apically.

== Life history ==
The recorded host plant for this species is Saccharum officinarum.
