= Brontispa veitchiae =

Scientific classification
- Kingdom: Animalia
- Phylum: Arthropoda
- Clade: Pancrustacea
- Class: Insecta
- Order: Coleoptera
- Suborder: Polyphaga
- Infraorder: Cucujiformia
- Family: Chrysomelidae
- Genus: Brontispa
- Species: B. veitchiae

Binomial name
- Brontispa veitchiae Gressitt, 1960

Species of beetle

Brontispa veitchiae is a species of beetle of the family Chrysomelidae. It is found in New Caledonia.

== Description ==
Adults reach a length of about 6.5-7.4 mm. They are pale orange ochraceous, but slightly more reddish on the side of the apex of te elytra. There is also a pitchy black stripe on the elytron. The antennae are reddish and the prothorax is pale.

The larvae are very pale, nearly white and somewhat testaceous on the caudal process. They reach a length of about 9 mm.

== Life history ==
The recorded host plants for this species are Veitchia species. Both adults and larvae feed on the under sides of partially expanded leaflets of their host plant.
