= Plesispa palmarum =

Scientific classification
- Kingdom: Animalia
- Phylum: Arthropoda
- Clade: Pancrustacea
- Class: Insecta
- Order: Coleoptera
- Suborder: Polyphaga
- Infraorder: Cucujiformia
- Family: Chrysomelidae
- Genus: Plesispa
- Species: P. palmarum

Binomial name
- Plesispa palmarum Gressitt, 1960

Species of beetle

Plesispa palmarum is a species of beetle of the family Chrysomelidae. It is found in central New Guinea.

== Description ==
Adults reach a length of about 6.7 mm. They are black to pale testaceous. The head is pitchy black, with some reddish brown and pitchy reddish areas. The antennae are pitchy black, slightly tinged with brownish basally. The elytra are pitchy black, becoming tinged with dull brown towards the apex. The posterolateral and apical margins are paler.

== Life history ==
The recorded host plants for this species are palms, possibly Rhopaloblaste species.
