= Brontispa norfolkensis =

Scientific classification
- Kingdom: Animalia
- Phylum: Arthropoda
- Clade: Pancrustacea
- Class: Insecta
- Order: Coleoptera
- Suborder: Polyphaga
- Infraorder: Cucujiformia
- Family: Chrysomelidae
- Genus: Brontispa
- Species: B. norfolkensis

Binomial name
- Brontispa norfolkensis Gressitt, 1960

Species of beetle

Brontispa norfolkensis is a species of beetle of the family Chrysomelidae. It is found on Norfolk Island.

== Description ==
Adults reach a length of about 6.6–7.5 mm. They are pale chestnut brown, but slightly ochraceous on the under surfaces and slightly paler the on legs.

== Life history ==
The recorded host plant for this species is Freycinetia baueriana.
