= Plesispa =

Scientific classification
- Kingdom: Animalia
- Phylum: Arthropoda
- Clade: Pancrustacea
- Class: Insecta
- Order: Coleoptera
- Suborder: Polyphaga
- Infraorder: Cucujiformia
- Family: Chrysomelidae
- Subfamily: Cassidinae
- Tribe: Cryptonychini
- Genus: Plesispa; Chapuis, 1875

Genus of leaf beetles

Plesispa is a genus of beetles belonging to the family Chrysomelidae.

== Species ==
- Plesispa hagensis Gressitt, 1960
- Plesispa korthalsiae Gressitt, 1963
- Plesispa montana Gressitt, 1960
- Plesispa palmella Gressitt, 1963
- Plesispa palmarum Gressitt, 1960
- Plesispa reichei Chapuis, 1875
- Plesispa saccharivora Gressitt, 1957
