= Brontispa sacchari =

Scientific classification
- Kingdom: Animalia
- Phylum: Arthropoda
- Clade: Pancrustacea
- Class: Insecta
- Order: Coleoptera
- Suborder: Polyphaga
- Infraorder: Cucujiformia
- Family: Chrysomelidae
- Genus: Brontispa
- Species: B. sacchari

Binomial name
- Brontispa sacchari Gressitt, 1960

Synonyms
- Brontispa lateralis sacchari Gressitt, 1960

Species of beetle

Brontispa sacchari is a species of beetle of the family Chrysomelidae. It is found in New Guinea.

== Description ==
Adults reach a length of about 7 mm. They are pale reddish brown with pitchy blackish along the median line of the pronotum, continuing across the scutellum and along the elytral suture. The antenna and head are blackish to pitchy reddish.

== Life history ==
The recorded host plants for this species are Saccharum and Eulalia species, as well as small sedges (Cyperaceae).
