= Plesispa palmella =

Scientific classification
- Kingdom: Animalia
- Phylum: Arthropoda
- Clade: Pancrustacea
- Class: Insecta
- Order: Coleoptera
- Suborder: Polyphaga
- Infraorder: Cucujiformia
- Family: Chrysomelidae
- Genus: Plesispa
- Species: P. palmella

Binomial name
- Plesispa palmella Gressitt, 1963

Species of beetle

Plesispa palmella is a species of beetle of the family Chrysomelidae. It is found in south-eastern and north-eastern New Guinea.

== Description ==
Adults reach a length of about 5–6 mm. They are pale reddish brown to pitchy black, while the pronotum and scutellum are ochraceous. The basal part of the elytra is reddish ochraceous, while the apical portion of the disc is blackish. The posterior four-fifths and suture are pitchy black.

== Life history ==
The recorded host plants for this species are Metroxylon, Archontophoenix, Phoenix, Korthalsia and Areca and species. Both the larvae and pupa are described.
