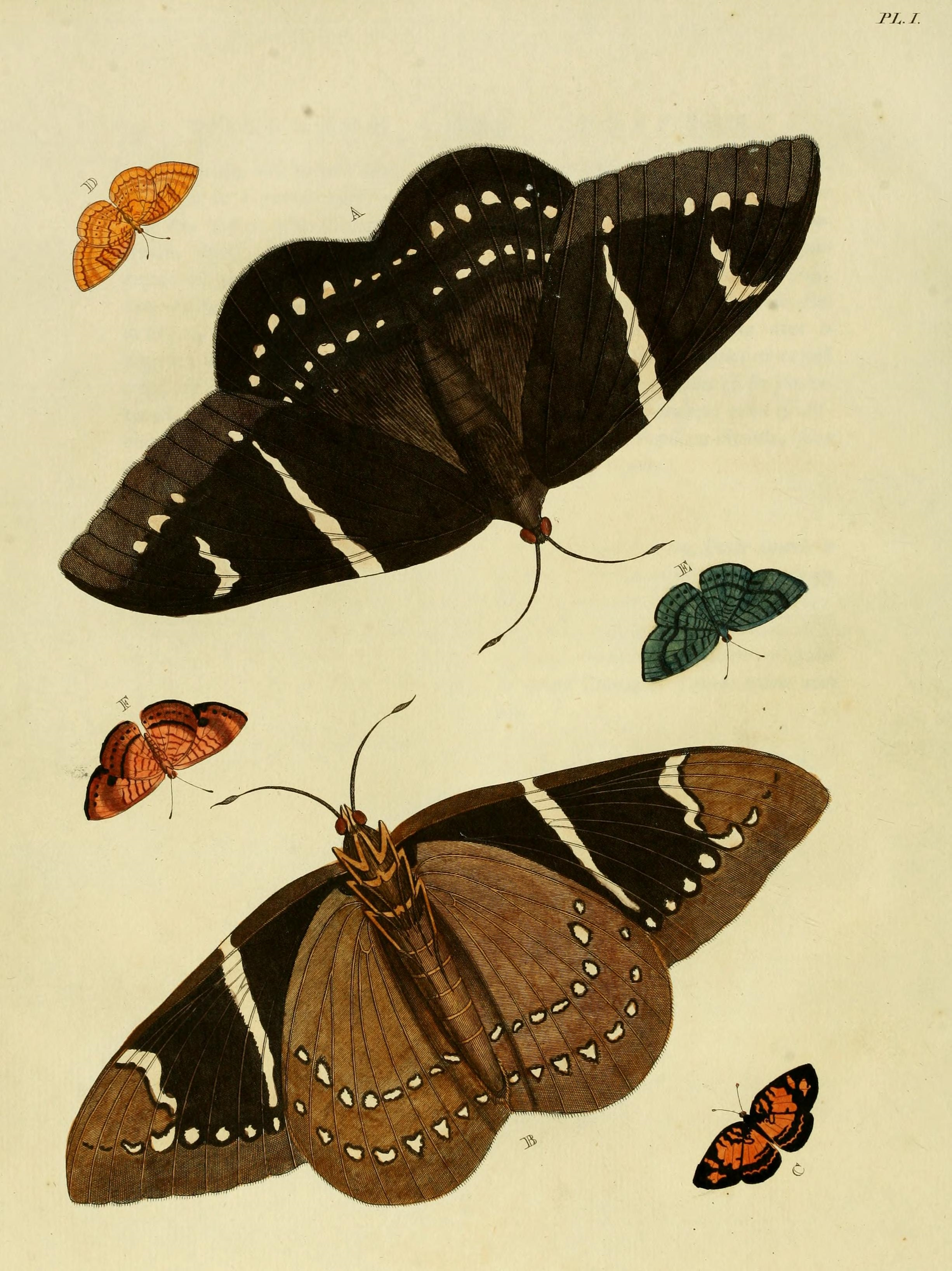
- Cramer&Stoll-uitlandsche kapellen vol. 1- plate

Scientific classification
- Domain: Eukaryota
- Kingdom: Animalia
- Phylum: Arthropoda
- Class: Insecta
- Order: Lepidoptera
- Family: Castniidae
- Subfamily: Castniinae
- Genus: Eupalamides; Houlbert, 1918

= Eupalamides =

Genus of moths

Eupalamides is a genus of moths within the family Castniidae. It was described by Constant Vincent Houlbert in 1918.

== Species ==
- Eupalamides boliviensis (Houlbert, 1917)
- Eupalamides cyparissias (Fabricius, 1777)
- Eupalamides geron (Kollar, 1839)
- Eupalamides guyanensis (Houlbert, 1917)
- Eupalamides preissi (Staudinger, 1899)
