= Brontispa gleadowi =

Scientific classification
- Kingdom: Animalia
- Phylum: Arthropoda
- Clade: Pancrustacea
- Class: Insecta
- Order: Coleoptera
- Suborder: Polyphaga
- Infraorder: Cucujiformia
- Family: Chrysomelidae
- Genus: Brontispa
- Species: B. gleadowi

Binomial name
- Brontispa gleadowi Weise, 1905

Species of beetle

Brontispa gleadowi is a species of beetle of the family Chrysomelidae. It is found on Mauritius.

== Life history ==
The recorded host plant for this species is Cocos nucifera.
