= Brontispa calami =

Scientific classification
- Kingdom: Animalia
- Phylum: Arthropoda
- Clade: Pancrustacea
- Class: Insecta
- Order: Coleoptera
- Suborder: Polyphaga
- Infraorder: Cucujiformia
- Family: Chrysomelidae
- Genus: Brontispa
- Species: B. calami

Binomial name
- Brontispa calami Gressitt, 1960

Species of beetle

Brontispa calami is a species of beetle of the family Chrysomelidae. It is found on the Solomon Islands (New Georgia).

== Description ==
Adults reach a length of about 7.5 mm. They are reddish ochraceous to pitchy black, with a reddish brown head and pitchy reddish antennae. The elytra are pitchy black, while the basal portion of the suture, extreme base of the disc and posterior portion of the external margin are reddish ochraceous.

== Life history ==
The recorded host plants for this species are Calamus species.
