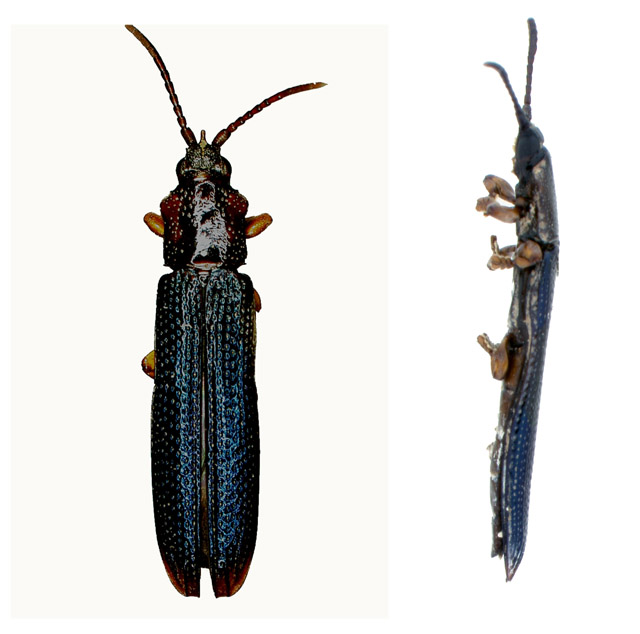

Scientific classification
- Kingdom: Animalia
- Phylum: Arthropoda
- Clade: Pancrustacea
- Class: Insecta
- Order: Coleoptera
- Suborder: Polyphaga
- Infraorder: Cucujiformia
- Family: Chrysomelidae
- Genus: Brontispa
- Species: B. palauensis

Binomial name
- Brontispa palauensis (Esaki & Chûjô, 1943)

Synonyms
- Planispa palauensis Esaki & Chûjô, 1943; Brontispa yoshinoi Barber, 1950

= Brontispa palauensis =

Species of beetle

Brontispa palauensis is a species of beetle of the family Chrysomelidae. It is found in Micronesia (Guam, Palau).

== Life history ==
The recorded host plants for this species are Cocos nucifera and Pandanus species.
