= Valanga coerulescens =

Scientific classification
- Kingdom: Animalia
- Phylum: Arthropoda
- Clade: Pancrustacea
- Class: Insecta
- Order: Orthoptera
- Suborder: Caelifera
- Family: Acrididae
- Genus: Valanga
- Species: V. coerulescens

Binomial name
- Valanga coerulescens Willemse, 1953

Species of insect

Valanga coerulescens is a species of grasshopper from the Acrididae family. It was scientifically described by Willemse in 1953.
