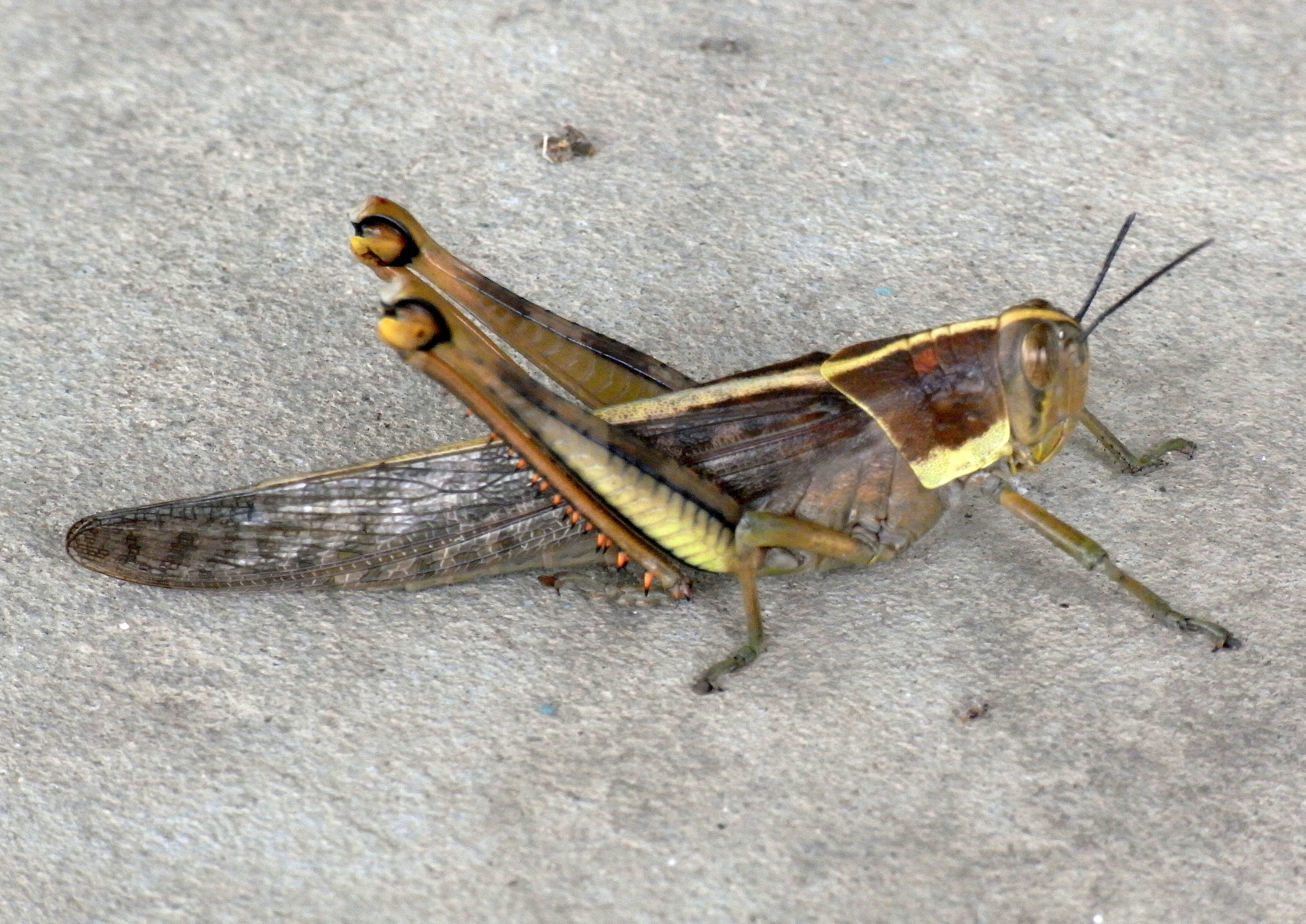
- Valanga irregularis

Scientific classification
- Kingdom: Animalia
- Phylum: Arthropoda
- Clade: Pancrustacea
- Class: Insecta
- Order: Orthoptera
- Suborder: Caelifera
- Family: Acrididae
- Tribe: Cyrtacanthacridini
- Genus: Valanga; Uvarov, 1932

Synonyms
- Yalanga Sjöstedt, 1932

= Valanga =

Genus of grasshoppers

Valanga is a genus of "bird grasshoppers" in the subfamily Cyrtacanthacridinae. Species are found from the Indian subcontinent through southeast Asia and the Korean Peninsula to Australia and the Pacific islands.

== Species ==
The Orthoptera Species File lists the following Valanga species:

- Valanga cheesmanae Uvarov, 1932
- Valanga chloropus Sjöstedt, 1932
- Valanga coerulescens Willemse, 1953
- Valanga conspersa Uvarov, 1923
- Valanga excavata Stål, 1861
- Valanga fakfakensis Sjöstedt, 1932
- Valanga geniculata Stål, 1877
- Valanga gilbertensis Willemse, 1970
- Valanga gohieri Le Guillou, 1841
- Valanga ilocano Rehn & Rehn, 1941
- Valanga irregularis Walker, 1870
- Valanga isolata Willemse, 1955
- Valanga marquesana Uvarov, 1927
- Valanga meleager Sjöstedt, 1921
- Valanga modesta Sjöstedt, 1921
- Valanga nigricornis (Burmeister, 1838) - type species (as Acridium nigricorne = V. nigricornis nigricornis)
- Valanga nobilis Sjöstedt, 1930
- Valanga papuasica Finot, 1907
- Valanga pulchripes Sjöstedt, 1921
- Valanga rapana Uvarov, 1927
- Valanga renschi Ramme, 1941
- Valanga rouxi Willemse, 1923
- Valanga rubrispinarum Sjöstedt, 1936
- Valanga salomonica Sjöstedt, 1932
- Valanga sjostedti Uvarov, 1923
- Valanga soror Sjöstedt, 1936
- Valanga stercoraria Holdhaus, 1909
- Valanga tenimberensis Sjöstedt, 1930
- Valanga transiens Walker, 1870
- Valanga uvarovia Willemse, 1955
- Valanga willemsei Sjöstedt, 1932
