= Atheloca =

Scientific classification
- Domain: Eukaryota
- Kingdom: Animalia
- Phylum: Arthropoda
- Class: Insecta
- Order: Lepidoptera
- Family: Pyralidae
- Subfamily: Phycitinae
- Genus: Atheloca; Heinrich, 1956

Genus of moths

Atheloca is a genus of snout moths. It was described by Carl Heinrich in 1956. It contains the species A. subrufella and A. bondari.
