= Valanga chloropus =

Scientific classification
- Kingdom: Animalia
- Phylum: Arthropoda
- Clade: Pancrustacea
- Class: Insecta
- Order: Orthoptera
- Suborder: Caelifera
- Family: Acrididae
- Genus: Valanga
- Species: V. chloropus

Binomial name
- Valanga chloropus Sjöstedt, 1932

Species of grasshopper

Valanga chloropus is a species of grasshopper native to Java. It was scientifically described in 1932 by Sjöstedt.
