= Telchin syphax =

Scientific classification
- Domain: Eukaryota
- Kingdom: Animalia
- Phylum: Arthropoda
- Class: Insecta
- Order: Lepidoptera
- Family: Castniidae
- Genus: Telchin
- Species: T. syphax

Binomial name
- Telchin syphax (Fabricius, 1775)

Synonyms
- Papilio syphax Fabricius, 1775; Erythrocastnia syphax; Papilio harmodius Cramer, [1779]; Castnia pirrha Dalla Torre, 1913; Erythrocastnia syphax ab. interrupta Lathy, 1922

Species of moth

Telchin syphax is a moth in the Castniidae family. It is widely distributed in the Amazon basin in South America.

The wingspan is 100–130 mm.

== Subspecies ==
- Telchin syphax syphax (Surinam, the Guianas, Venezuela, Trinidad)
- Telchin syphax completa (Lathy, 1922) (Brazil)
