= Brontispa archontophoenica =

Scientific classification
- Kingdom: Animalia
- Phylum: Arthropoda
- Clade: Pancrustacea
- Class: Insecta
- Order: Coleoptera
- Suborder: Polyphaga
- Infraorder: Cucujiformia
- Family: Chrysomelidae
- Genus: Brontispa
- Species: B. archontophoenica

Binomial name
- Brontispa archontophoenica Gressitt, 1960

Species of beetle

Brontispa archontophoenica is a species of beetle of the family Chrysomelidae. It is found in New Guinea.

== Description ==
Adults reach a length of about 9.7–10.5 mm. They are dark pitchy brown to pale ochraceous, with a reddish pitchy head and pitchy black antennae that become dark reddish basally and distally.

== Life history ==
The recorded host plants for this species are Archontophoenix species.
