= Brontispa longissima =

Scientific classification
- Kingdom: Animalia
- Phylum: Arthropoda
- Clade: Pancrustacea
- Class: Insecta
- Order: Coleoptera
- Suborder: Polyphaga
- Infraorder: Cucujiformia
- Family: Chrysomelidae
- Genus: Brontispa
- Species: B. longissima

Binomial name
- Brontispa longissima (Gestro, 1885)

Synonyms
- Oxycephala longissima Gestro, 1885; Brontispa castanea Lea, 1926; Brontispa froggatti Sharp, 1903; Bronthispa javana Weise, 1922; Oxycephala longipennis Gestro, 1892; Bronthispa reicherti Uhmann, 1929; Bronthispa selebensis Gestro, 1923; Brontispa simmondsi Maulik, 1927

Species of beetle

Brontispa longissima (known as the coconut leaf beetle, the two-coloured coconut leaf beetle, or the coconut hispine beetle) is a leaf beetle that feeds on young leaves and damages seedlings and mature coconut palms. It has become an increasingly serious pest of coconuts throughout various growing regions in the Pacific, especially over the last 3 decades, including Indonesia, Solomon Islands, Vietnam, Nauru, Cambodia, Laos, Thailand, Maldives, Myanmar, Hainan Island, and Aru Islands, and most recently, the Philippines.

In Japan, the occurrence of Brontispa longissima was first reported on Okinawa Island in 1978. The species spread to other islands of Okinawa Prefecture. Ishigaki Island in 1982, and Miyako, Iriomote and Yonaguni Islands in 1984.

On September 27, 2007, Philippines' Metro Manila and 26 provinces were quarantined due to having been infested with this pest (to save the $800-million Philippine coconut industry).

Control measures include pesticides, and biological control agents such as parasitic wasps (e.g., Asecodes hispinarum).

There is a similar-looking pest species of leaf beetle in a related genus, Plesispa reichei, also sometimes referred to as the "coconut leaf beetle", which is distinguished only with some difficulty from B. longissima; primarily by its slightly broader body and stronger punctation.

== Sources ==
- ASEAN IPM Fact Sheet
