= Brontispa eversi =

Scientific classification
- Kingdom: Animalia
- Phylum: Arthropoda
- Clade: Pancrustacea
- Class: Insecta
- Order: Coleoptera
- Suborder: Polyphaga
- Infraorder: Cucujiformia
- Family: Chrysomelidae
- Genus: Brontispa
- Species: B. eversi

Binomial name
- Brontispa eversi Gressitt, 1960

Species of beetle

Brontispa eversi is a species of beetle of the family Chrysomelidae. It is found in New Guinea (Biak).

== Description ==
Adults reach a length of about 8–10.5 mm. They are shiny pitchy black to pale ochraceous, with a black head and pitchy red antennae. The elytra are shiny black, becoming pitchy reddish on the posterior area of the external margin and reddish at the apex.

== Life history ==
The recorded host plants for this species are Cyperaceae species.
