= Eupalamides guyanensis =

Scientific classification
- Domain: Eukaryota
- Kingdom: Animalia
- Phylum: Arthropoda
- Class: Insecta
- Order: Lepidoptera
- Family: Castniidae
- Genus: Eupalamides
- Species: E. guyanensis

Binomial name
- Eupalamides guyanensis (Houlbert, 1917)

Synonyms
- Castnia guyanensis Houlbert, 1917; Castnia grandis Jordan, 1917; Castnia amazonicus Moss, 1945 (preocc.)

Species of moth

Eupalamides guyanensis is a moth in the Castniidae family. It is widely distributed in northern South America, from Venezuela to Guyana, Colombia and Brazil (Pará).

The wingspan is 150–180 mm.

The larvae feed on Cocos nucifera and are considered a pest. They have also been recorded on Attalea species.
