= Brontispa cyperaceae =

Scientific classification
- Kingdom: Animalia
- Phylum: Arthropoda
- Clade: Pancrustacea
- Class: Insecta
- Order: Coleoptera
- Suborder: Polyphaga
- Infraorder: Cucujiformia
- Family: Chrysomelidae
- Genus: Brontispa
- Species: B. cyperaceae

Binomial name
- Brontispa cyperaceae Gressitt, 1963

Species of beetle

Brontispa cyperaceae is a species of beetle of the family Chrysomelidae. It is found in south-eastern New Guinea.

== Description ==
Adults reach a length of about 7.2-7.7 mm. They are reddish ochraceous to pitchy black. The head is dark reddish tinged with pitchy and the antenna are dark pitchy brown, with some reddish in the middle area. The pronotum is reddish ochraceous. The elytra are also reddish ochraceous in basal one-third, but the rest is darker reddish.

== Life history ==
The recorded host plants for this species are sedges (Cyperaceae). The larvae have also been described. They are pale testaceous and reach a length of about 7.5 mm.
