= Brontispa simonthomasi =

Scientific classification
- Kingdom: Animalia
- Phylum: Arthropoda
- Clade: Pancrustacea
- Class: Insecta
- Order: Coleoptera
- Suborder: Polyphaga
- Infraorder: Cucujiformia
- Family: Chrysomelidae
- Genus: Brontispa
- Species: B. simonthomasi

Binomial name
- Brontispa simonthomasi Gressitt, 1960

Species of beetle

Brontispa simonthomasi is a species of beetle of the family Chrysomelidae. It is found in New Guinea.

== Description ==
Adults reach a length of about 7.9 mm. They are pale orange ochraceous to pitchy black, with a dull reddish head and reddish antennae. The elytra are pitchy black, with a broad pale ochraceous basal band on the basal portion.

== Life history ==
The recorded host plants for this species are Cyperaceae species.
