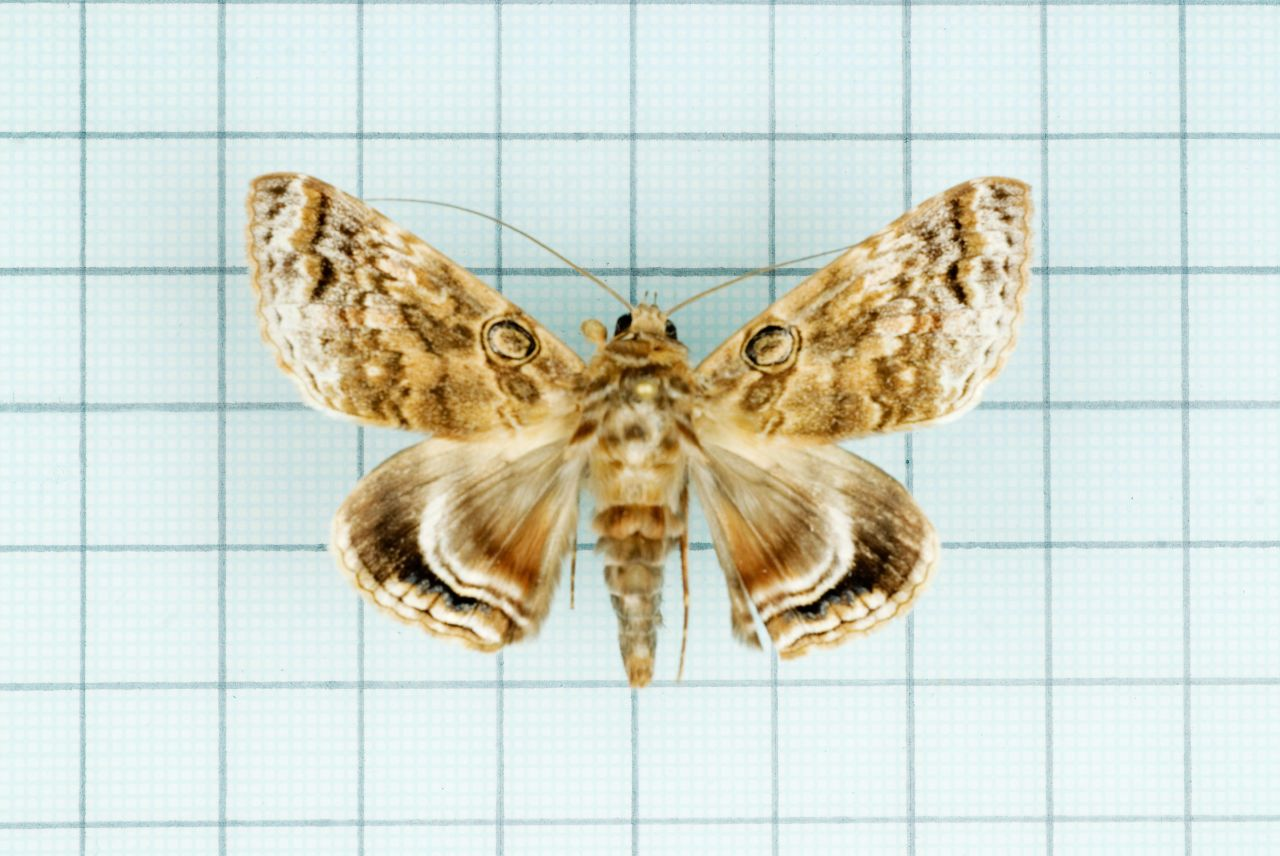
- Cyclodes omma

Scientific classification
- Kingdom: Animalia
- Phylum: Arthropoda
- Class: Insecta
- Order: Lepidoptera
- Superfamily: Noctuoidea
- Family: Erebidae
- Subfamily: Calpinae
- Genus: Cyclodes; Guenée in Boisduval & Guenée, 1852

Synonyms
- Beregra Walker, 1858

= Cyclodes (moth) =

Genus of moths

Cyclodes is a genus of moths of the family Erebidae.

== Description ==
Palpi smoothly scaled, where the second joint reaching vertex of head and minute third joint. Antennae simple. Thorax hairy. Abdomen with strong ridges of coarse hair. Tibia slightly hairy and spineless. Forewings with nearly rectangular apex. Outer margin obliquely rounded. Hindwings with vein 5 arise from above the angle of cell.

== Species ==
- Cyclodes omma Hoeven, 1840
- Cyclodes spectans Snellen, 1886
