= Plesispa saccharivora =

Scientific classification
- Kingdom: Animalia
- Phylum: Arthropoda
- Clade: Pancrustacea
- Class: Insecta
- Order: Coleoptera
- Suborder: Polyphaga
- Infraorder: Cucujiformia
- Family: Chrysomelidae
- Genus: Plesispa
- Species: P. saccharivora

Binomial name
- Plesispa saccharivora Gressitt, 1957

Species of beetle

Plesispa saccharivora is a species of beetle of the family Chrysomelidae. It is found in central New Guinea.

== Life history ==
The recorded host plant for this species is Saccharum officinarum.
