= Eupalamides boliviensis =

Scientific classification
- Kingdom: Animalia
- Phylum: Arthropoda
- Class: Insecta
- Order: Lepidoptera
- Family: Castniidae
- Genus: Eupalamides
- Species: E. boliviensis

Binomial name
- Eupalamides boliviensis (Houlbert, 1917)

Synonyms
- Castnia boliviensis Houlbert, 1917

Species of moth

Eupalamides boliviensis is a moth in the Castniidae family. It is found in Bolivia.
