= Brontispa balakae =

Scientific classification
- Kingdom: Animalia
- Phylum: Arthropoda
- Clade: Pancrustacea
- Class: Insecta
- Order: Coleoptera
- Suborder: Polyphaga
- Infraorder: Cucujiformia
- Family: Chrysomelidae
- Genus: Brontispa
- Species: B. balakae

Binomial name
- Brontispa balakae Gressitt, 1957

Species of beetle

Brontispa balakae is a species of beetle of the family Chrysomelidae. It is found on Samoa.

== Description ==
Adults reach a length of about 6.7-8 mm. The body is reddish castaneous, but darker on the pronotum. The antennae partly reddish, partly pitchy to black. The elytra are slightly iridescent blue, becoming brownish towards the apex and black along the suture and basal margin.

== Life history ==
The recorded host plants for this species are Balaka rechingeriana and Clinostigma oncorhyncha.
