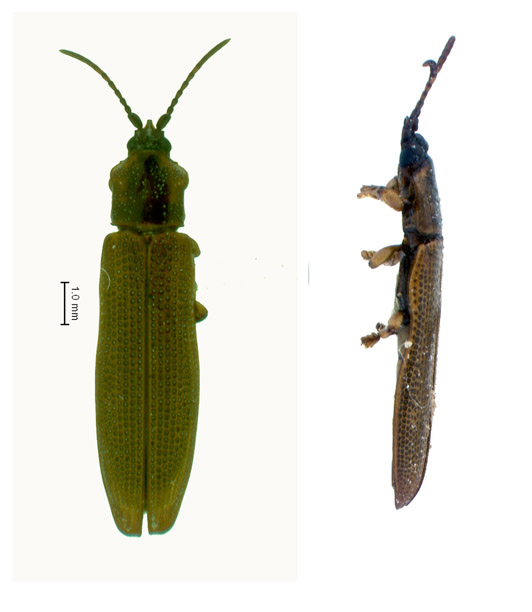

Scientific classification
- Kingdom: Animalia
- Phylum: Arthropoda
- Clade: Pancrustacea
- Class: Insecta
- Order: Coleoptera
- Suborder: Polyphaga
- Infraorder: Cucujiformia
- Family: Chrysomelidae
- Genus: Brontispa
- Species: B. mariana

Binomial name
- Brontispa mariana Spaeth, 1937

Synonyms
- Brontispa castaneipennis Chûjô, 1937

= Brontispa mariana =

Species of beetle

Brontispa mariana is a species of beetle of the family Chrysomelidae. It is found in Micronesia (Caroline Islands, Rota, Saipan, Tinian, Truk, Yap).

== Life history ==
The recorded host plants for this species are Cocos nucifera and Areca catechu.
