= Eupalamides cyparissias =

Scientific classification
- Domain: Eukaryota
- Kingdom: Animalia
- Phylum: Arthropoda
- Class: Insecta
- Order: Lepidoptera
- Family: Castniidae
- Genus: Eupalamides
- Species: E. cyparissias

Binomial name
- Eupalamides cyparissias (Fabricius, 1777)

Synonyms
- Papilio cyparissias Fabricius, 1777; Papilio dedalus Cramer, [1775] (preocc. Papilio daedalus Fabricius, 1775); Castnia amazonensis Houlbert, 1917; Castnia conspicua Rothschild, 1919; Castnia dedalus ab. magnipuncta Rothschild, 1919; Castnia daedalus Auctt.; Cyparissias paraensis Lathy, 1922

Species of moth

Eupalamides cyparissias is a moth in the Castniidae family. It is widespread in the Amazon basin including Peru, Colombia, Ecuador, Venezuela, Brazil, the Guianas, Suriname and north to Panama.

The wingspan is 140–180 mm.

The larvae have been recorded feeding on Elaeis guineensis, Cocos nucifera, Mauritia carana, Mauritiella peruviana, Astrocaryum murumuru and Astrocaryum javarense and are considered a major pest to economically important palm species. The larvae are 110–130 mm long.

== Subspecies ==
- Eupalamides cyparissias cyparissias (Trinidad, Guyana, Surinam, Panama)
- Eupalamides cyparissias amazonensis (Houlbert, 1917) (Amazonas, Peru)
- Eupalamides cyparissias conspicua (Rothschild, 1919) (Bolivia)
- Eupalamides cyparissias paraensis (Lathy, 1922) (Brazil: Para)
