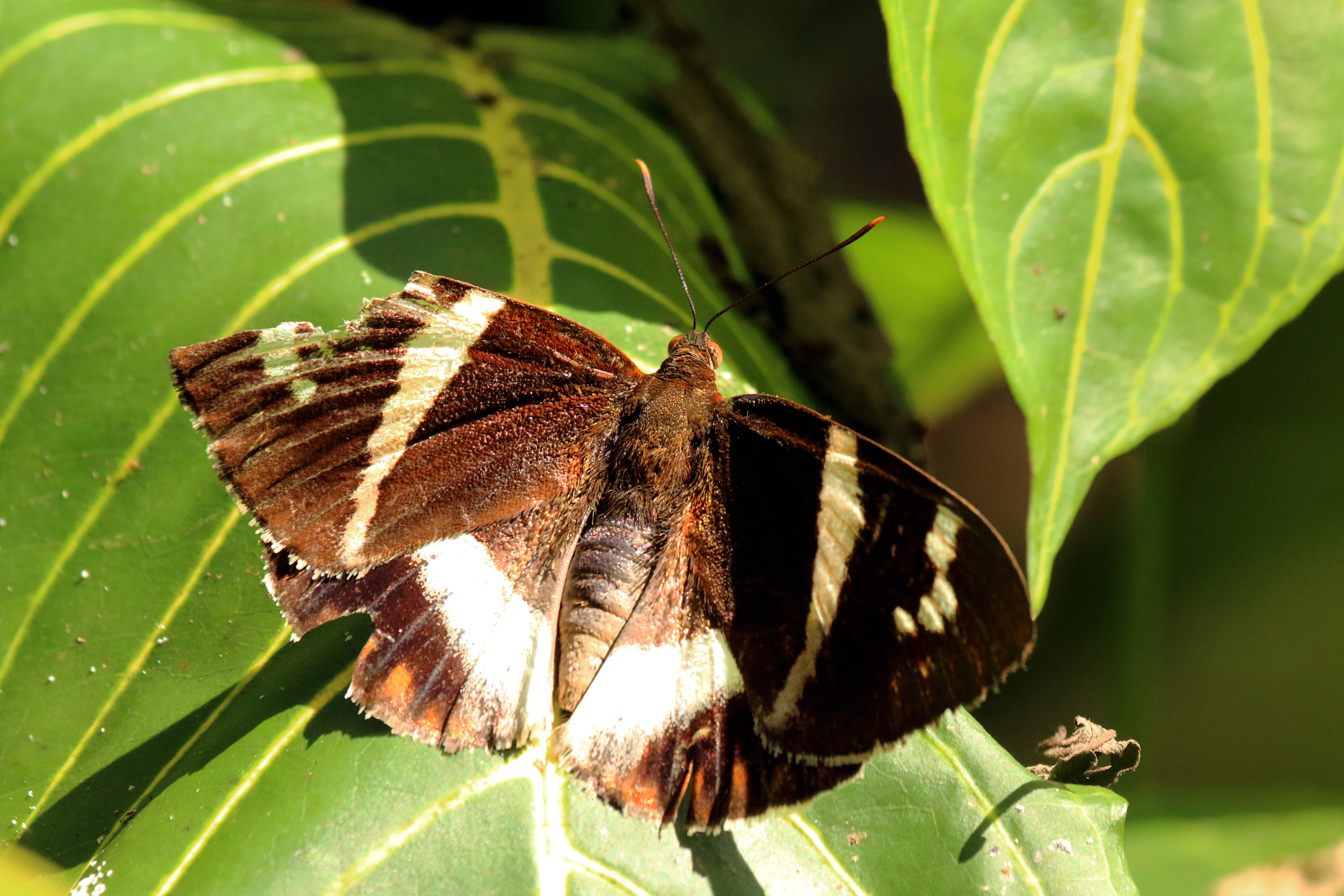
- T. l. insularis, Trinidad
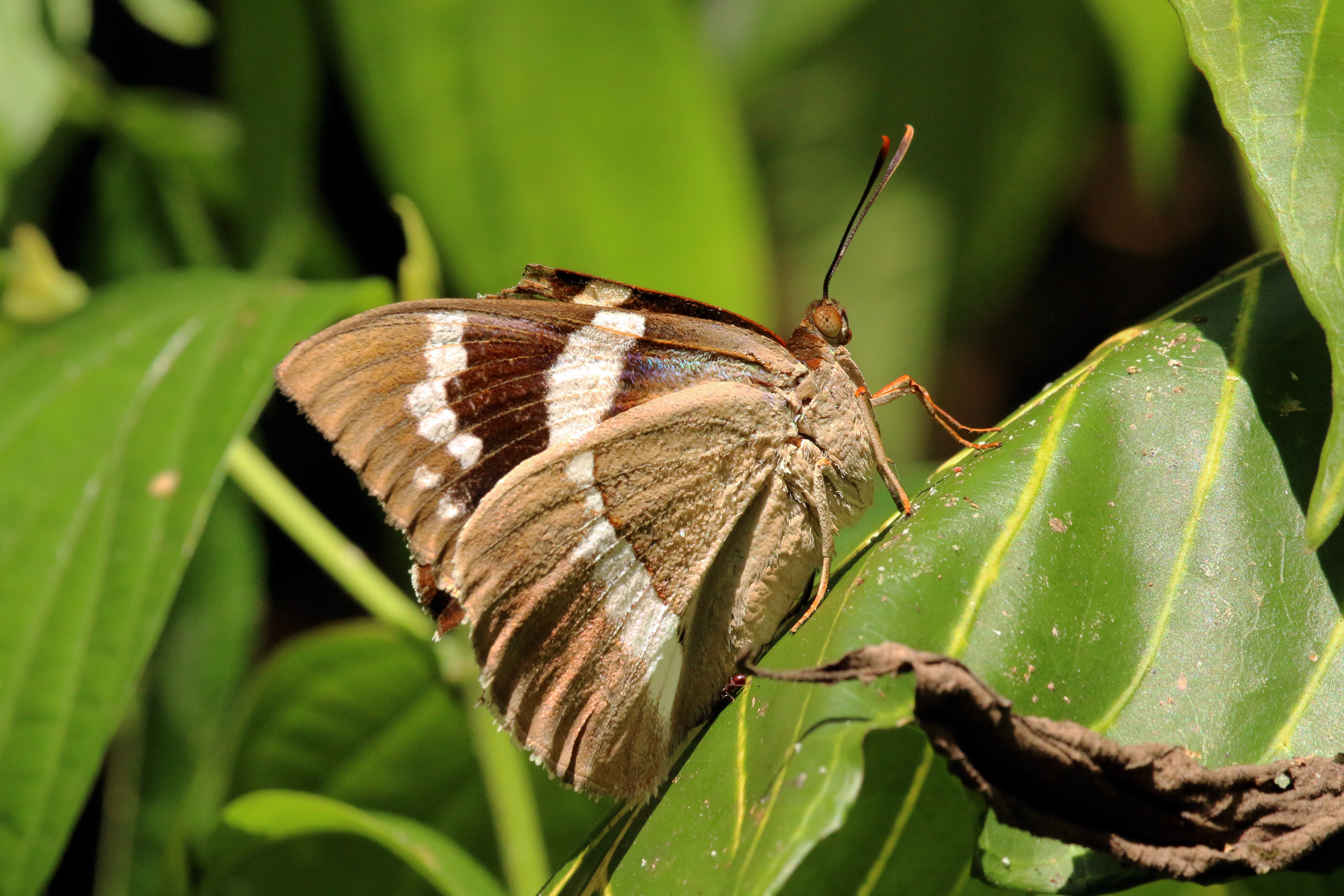

Scientific classification
- Domain: Eukaryota
- Kingdom: Animalia
- Phylum: Arthropoda
- Class: Insecta
- Order: Lepidoptera
- Family: Castniidae
- Genus: Telchin
- Species: T. licus

Binomial name
- Telchin licus (Drury, 1773)

Synonyms
- Papilio licus Drury, 1773; Castnia licus (Drury, 1773); Castnia licoides (Boisduval, 1875); Castnia albomaculata Houlbert, 1917; Castnia chocoensis Hopp, 1925; Castnia insularis Houlbert, 1918; Castnia pauperata Strand, 1913; Castnia macularifascia Houlbert, 1917; Castnia sebai Houlbert, 1918; Castnia magdalena Joicey & Talbot, 1925; Castnia microsticta Rothschild, 1919; Castnia rubromaculata Houlbert, 1917; Castnia talboti Lathy, 1922

= Telchin licus =

Species of moth

Telchin licus, the banana stem borer, is a moth of the Castniidae family. It is native to South America, where it is found from Colombia, Venezuela and the Guianas, throughout the Amazon basin in Brazil and Peru. It has also been recorded as an introduced species in Hawaii.

The length of the forewings is 64–80 mm.

The larvae feed on Saccharum officinarum, Musa, Heliconia and Ichnosiphon species. It is considered a pest species. Young larvae make a small cavity and then tunnel into the heart of the cane of the host plant. They tunnel upwards and downwards, and create a shelter in the rootstock where they rest. Pupation takes place in the rootstock or at the base of the cane.

== Subspecies ==
- Telchin licus licus (Brazil)
- Telchin licus albomaculata (Houlbert, 1917) (Colombia, Peru)
- Telchin licus chocoensis (Hopp, 1925) (Colombia)
- Telchin licus insularis (Houlbert, 1918) (Trinidad)
- Telchin licus laura (Druce, 1896) (Brazil)
- Telchin licus licoidella (Strand, 1913) (Peru)
- Telchin licus pauperata (Strand, 1913) (Surinam, French Guiana, Guyana)
- Telchin licus magdalena (Joicey & Talbot, 1925) (Colombia)
- Telchin licus microsticta (Rothschild, 1919) (Nicaragua)
- Telchin licus rubromaculata (Houlbert, 1917) (Brazil, Bolivia)
- Telchin licus talboti (Lathy, 1922) (Ecuador)
- Telchin licus vorax Lamas, 1995 (Peru)
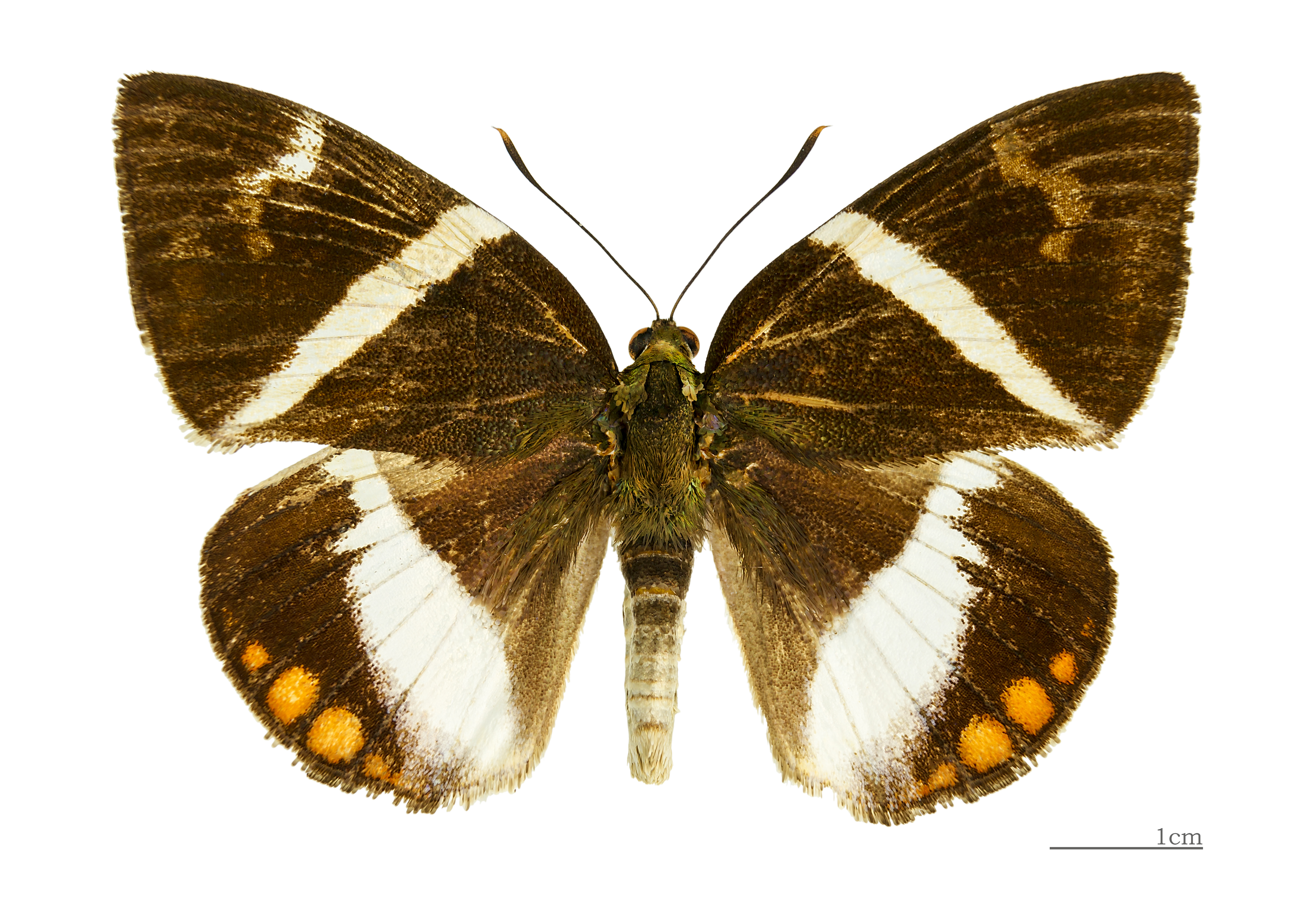
Telchin licus MHNT

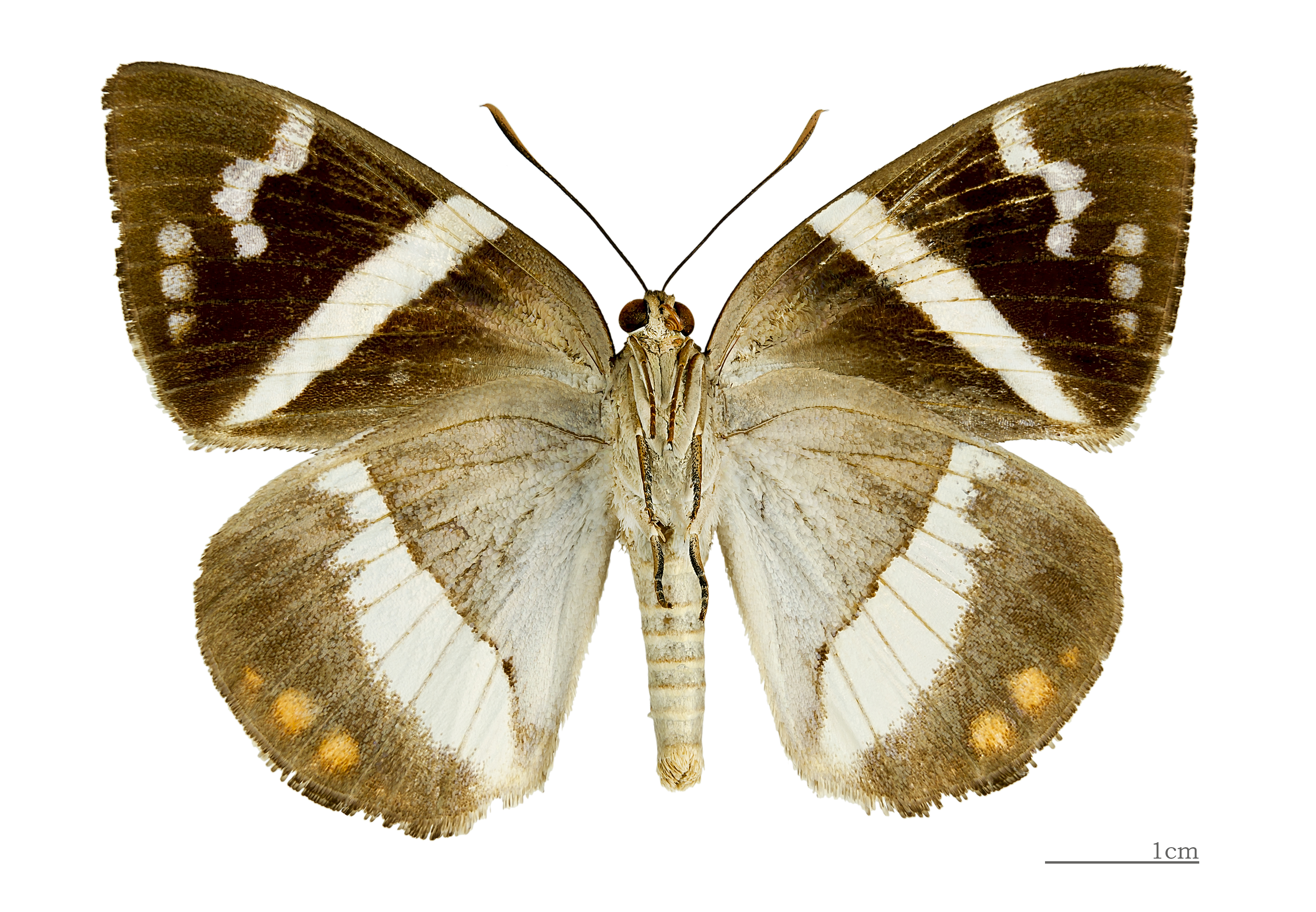
Telchin licus - △ MHNT
