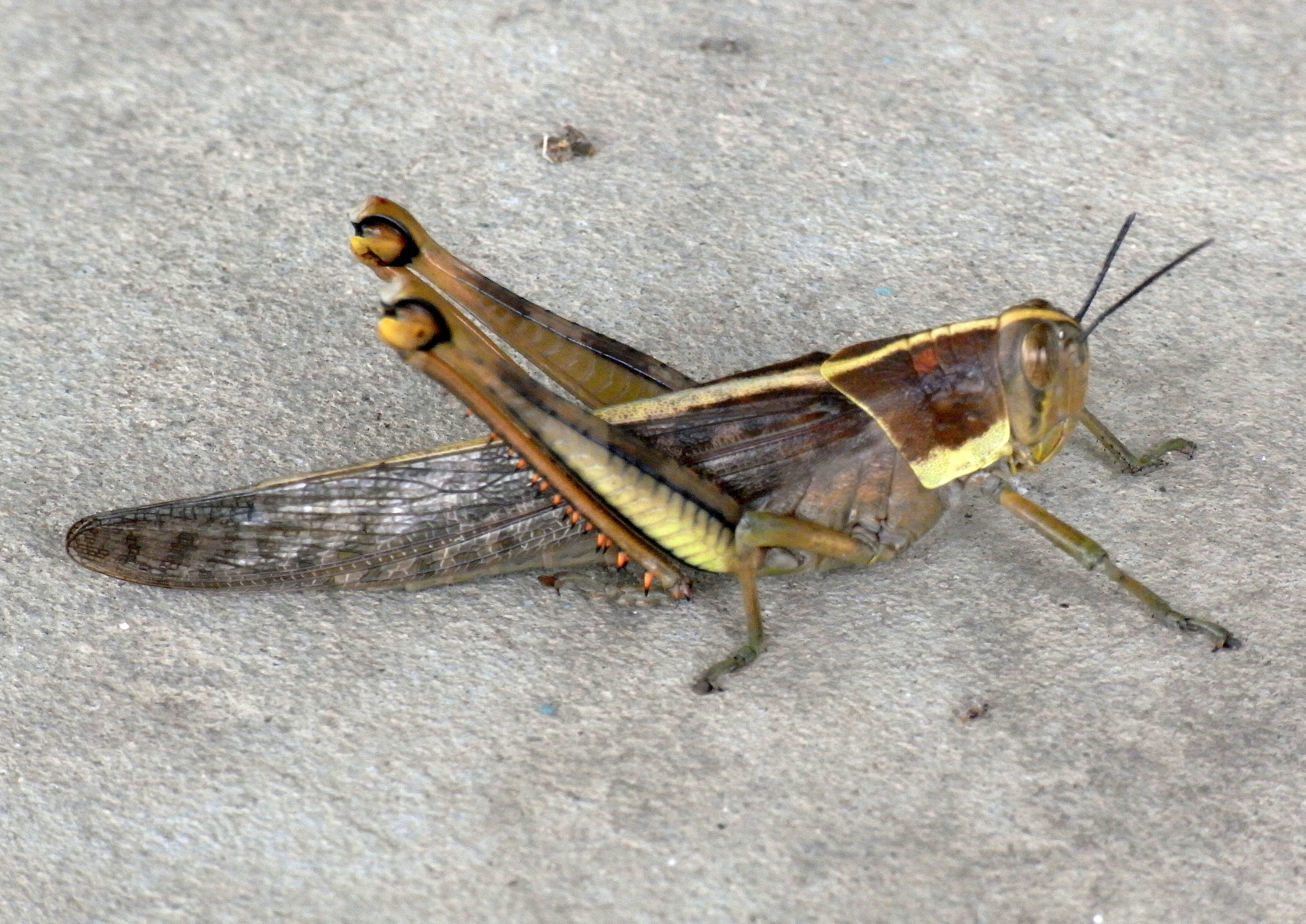

Scientific classification
- Kingdom: Animalia
- Phylum: Arthropoda
- Clade: Pancrustacea
- Class: Insecta
- Order: Orthoptera
- Suborder: Caelifera
- Family: Acrididae
- Genus: Valanga
- Species: V. irregularis

Binomial name
- Valanga irregularis (Walker, F., 1870)

= Valanga irregularis =

Species of grasshopper

Valanga irregularis, the giant grasshopper, giant valanga or hedge grasshopper, is a large grasshopper belonging to the family Acrididae. The largest grasshopper in Australia, its distribution is restricted to the Australian tropics and subtropics. They are a solitary species.

== Description ==
Both sexes look similar but differ in body size. Female individuals can reach up to 60 to 75 millimetres in length, males about 45 to 55 millimetres, hence they count as the largest grasshopper in Australia and in Southern African countries. Some reports refer a body length up to 90 millimetres.

The body colour and pattern varies highly. Adults have a creamy brown to greyish green colouring. The forewings show a black dot pattern, the hindwings are dark grey, sometimes also colourless or light green. At the tibia orange and red spines with black stings are visible.

== Distribution ==
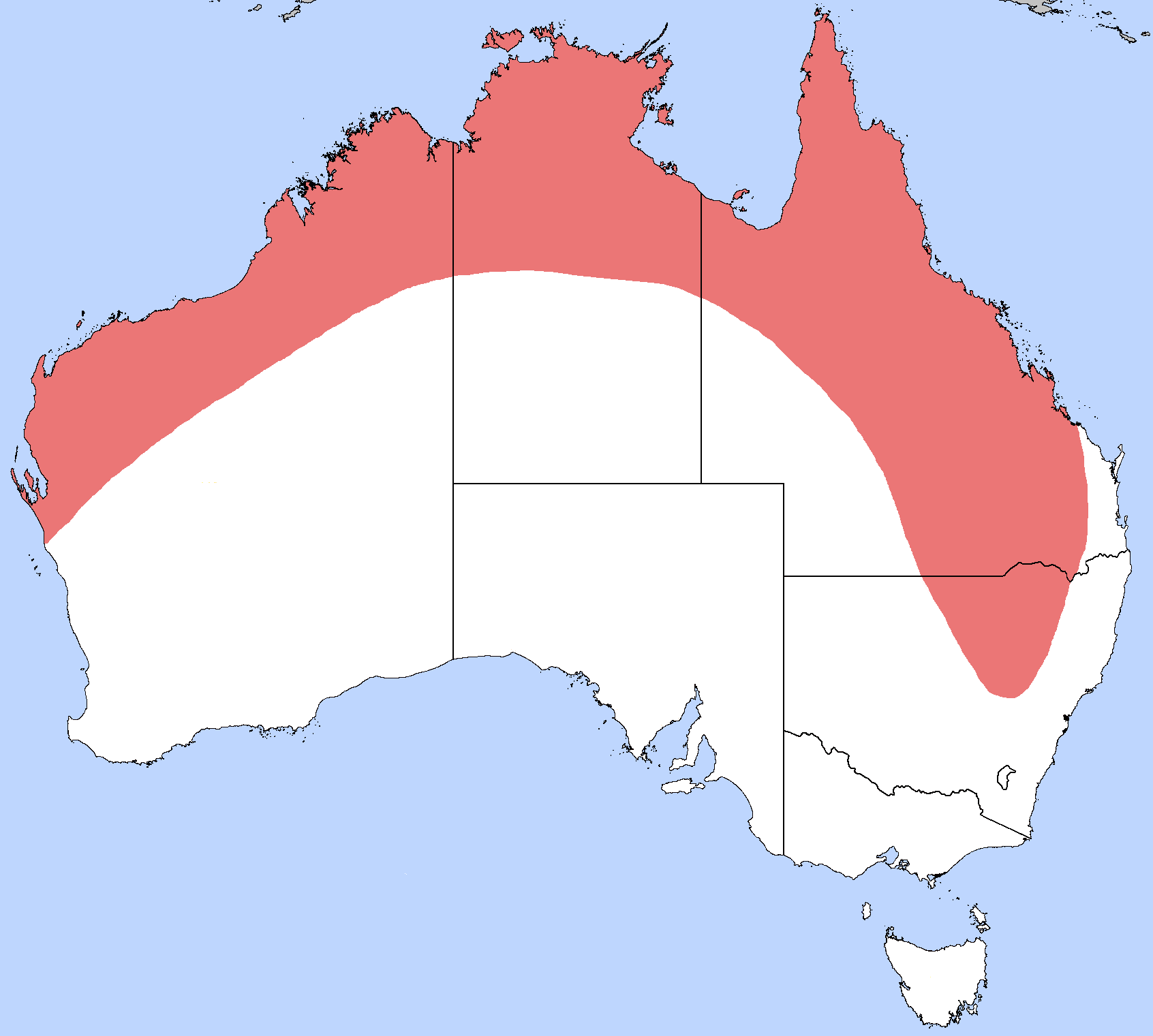
Distribution map

Valanga irregularis is native in the tropic and subtropic regions of Australia, northward of Sydney, although in WA they are found as far south as Perth.

The species favours a moist climate. In spring and autumn they are often found in grassland or forest. If the atmospheric conditions are ideal they sometimes leave for suburban gardens.

== Ecology ==
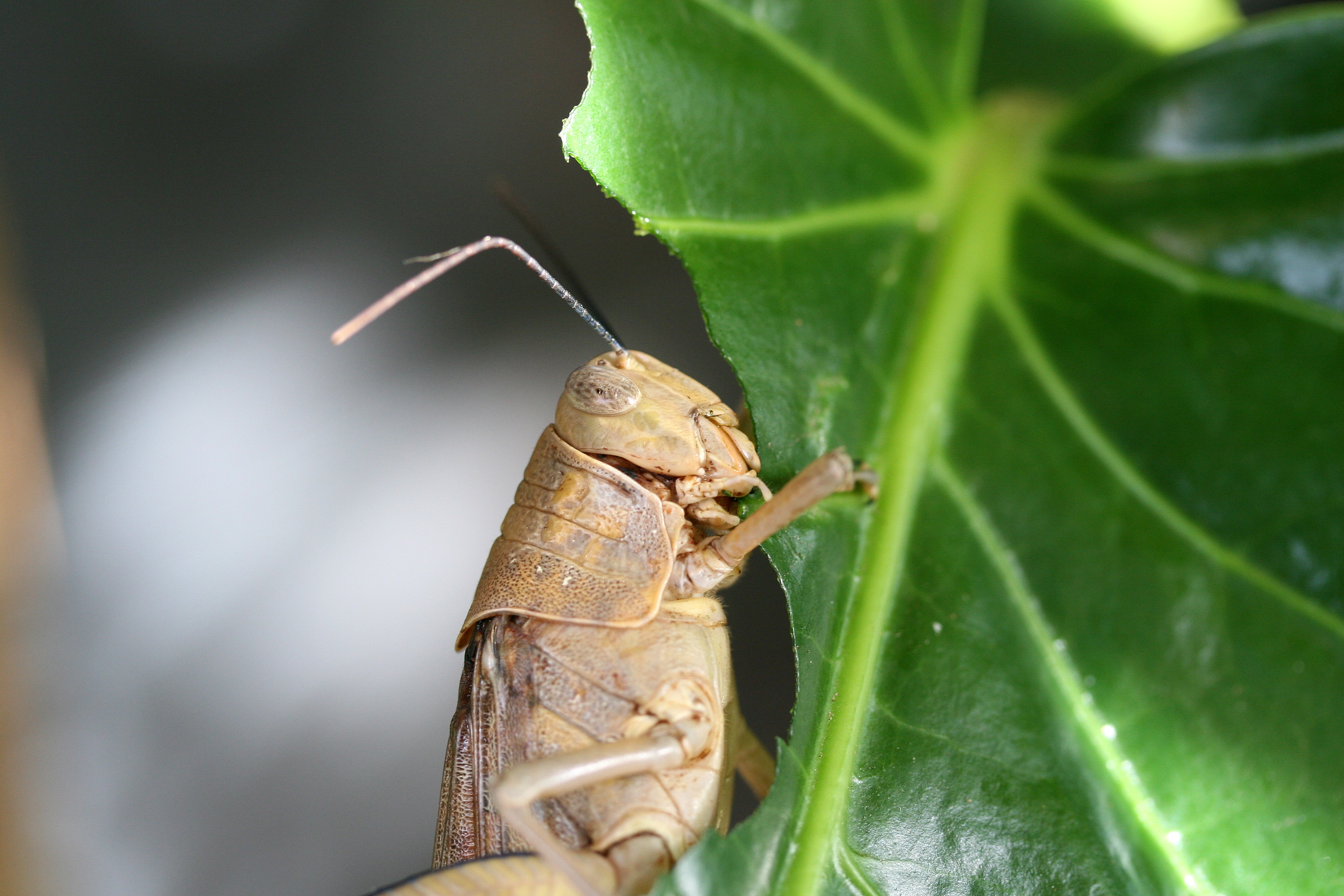
Giant valanga eating a leaf

Valanga irregularis feeds on shrubs, in particular Acalypha, Hibiscus or Bauhinia. Another food source are palm trees (Arecaceae). They possess strong mandibles which are used to eat the plant beginning from the leaf margin. The feeding takes place all night long and they remain hidden behind branches during hot and rainy days.

Adult individuals are good jumpers and can defend against predators like mantises (Mantodea) or lynx spiders with the spines on the hindlegs. Moreover, Valanga irregularis is well camouflaged as the body colour resembles the plant stem and leaf they are hiding behind.

Valanga irregularis mostly lives in solitude and does not form swarms. However, under favourable conditions, they may set up in small groups and may cause damage as for instance on young coffee berries. Nevertheless, the species does not count as an ecological vermin.

Adults generally spend the winter months in their hideout but they remain not completely inactive as they leave their lair from time to time for eating or sunbathing. The mating season begins in the first warm spring days. The males call the females with noises and they typically meet on the food supply.

== Development ==
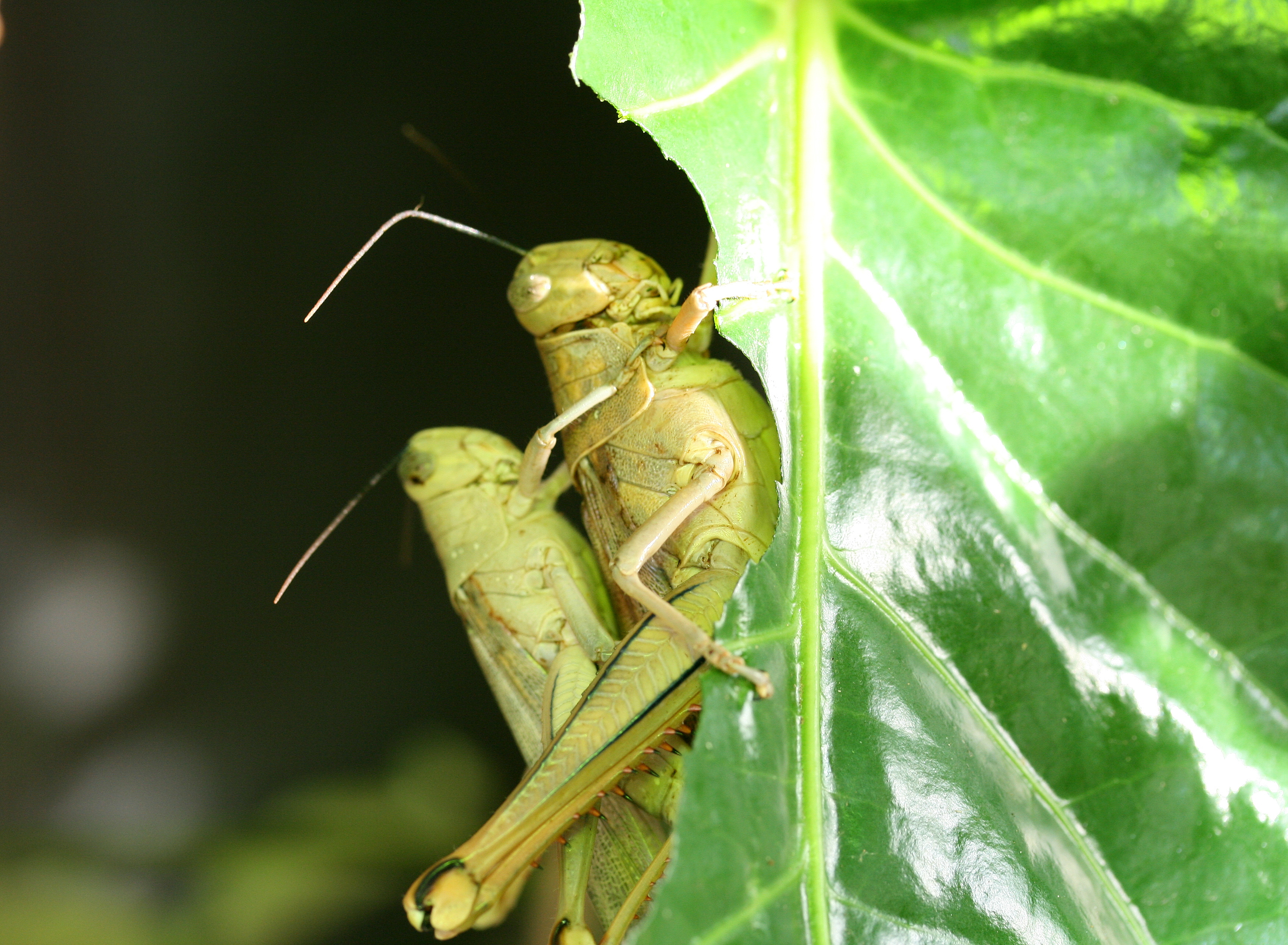
Copulation

Each year one generation is bred. The life cycle is adjusted to the wet and dry season in the tropics and subtropics. The eggs are deposited in early summer and measure 5-6 millimetres. For oviposition the female drills a cylinder-shaped duct up to 90 millimetres into the moist soil. The clutch is deposited at the bottom of the duct and contains up to 150 eggs. The duct is then plugged with a frothy substance to keep the eggs moist during the dry season.

The initial 5 millimetres long nymphs hatch and leave the duct with the first heavy rainfall. During the next three months they go through seven instar stages. In late summer and autumn the last moulting to become imagos takes place. The last instar stage resembles the imago in shape and appearance but is flightless.

== Systematics ==
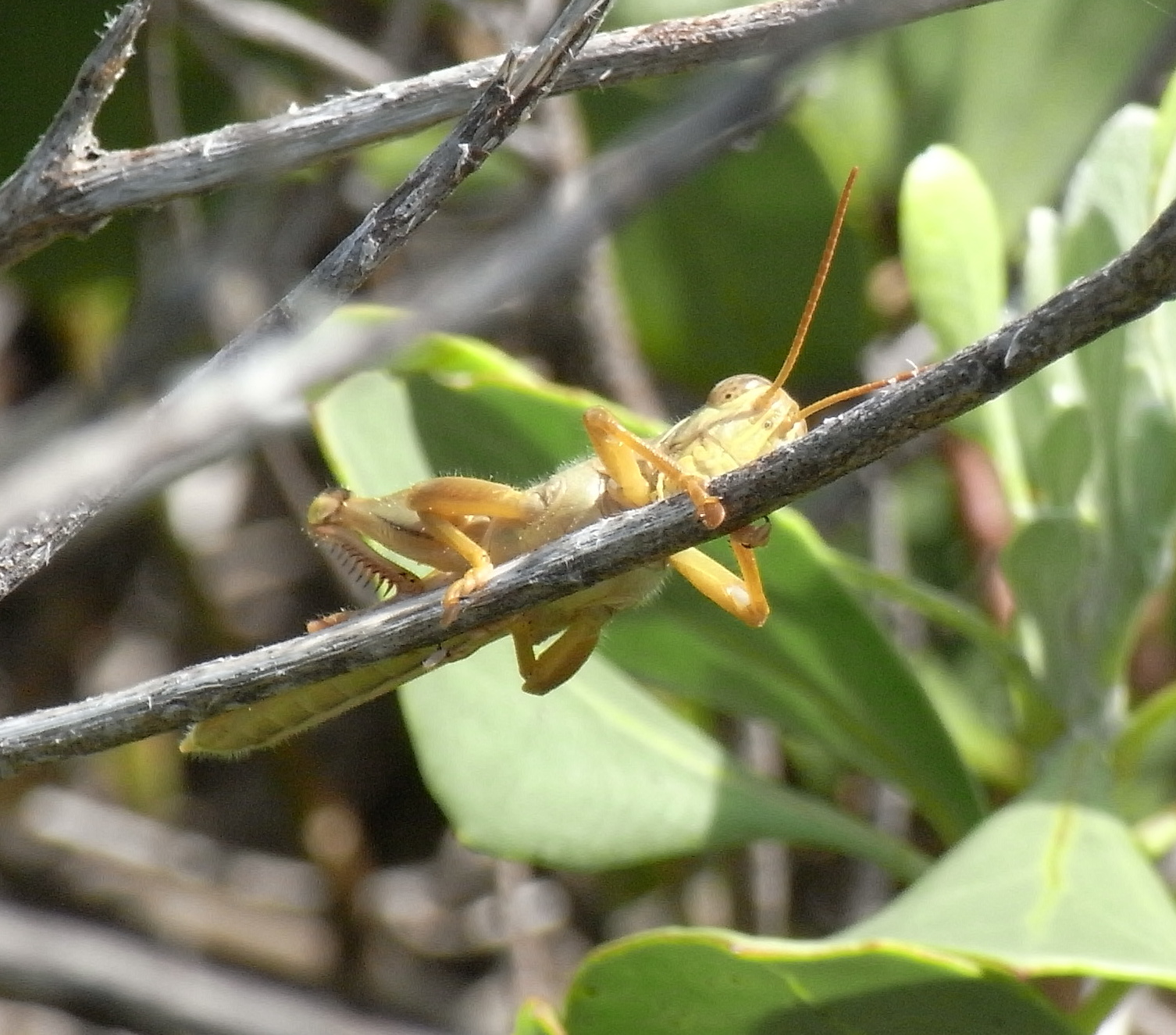
Green colour variation

The species Valanga irregularis was first described by the British entomologist Francis Walker in 1870. The type specimen is still present in the collection of the Natural History Museum in London.

The species name comes from the Javanese word "Walang" for "grasshopper". The Latin byname "irregularis" means "irregular" and indicates the diversity of colour within this species.

There are two known subspecies:

- Valanga irregularis irregularis (Walker, 1870)
- Valanga irregularis signata (Sjöstedt, 1921)
