= Brontispa limbata =

Scientific classification
- Kingdom: Animalia
- Phylum: Arthropoda
- Clade: Pancrustacea
- Class: Insecta
- Order: Coleoptera
- Suborder: Polyphaga
- Infraorder: Cucujiformia
- Family: Chrysomelidae
- Genus: Brontispa
- Species: B. limbata

Binomial name
- Brontispa limbata (Waterhouse, 1876)

Synonyms
- Cryptonychus limbatus Waterhouse, 1876

Species of beetle

Brontispa limbata is a species of beetle of the family Chrysomelidae. It is found on Mauritius and Rodrigues.

== Life history ==
The recorded host plants for this species are Dictyosperma album, Acanthophoenix crinita, Mascarena revaughanii, Chrysalidocarpus madagascariensis and Rhapis species.
