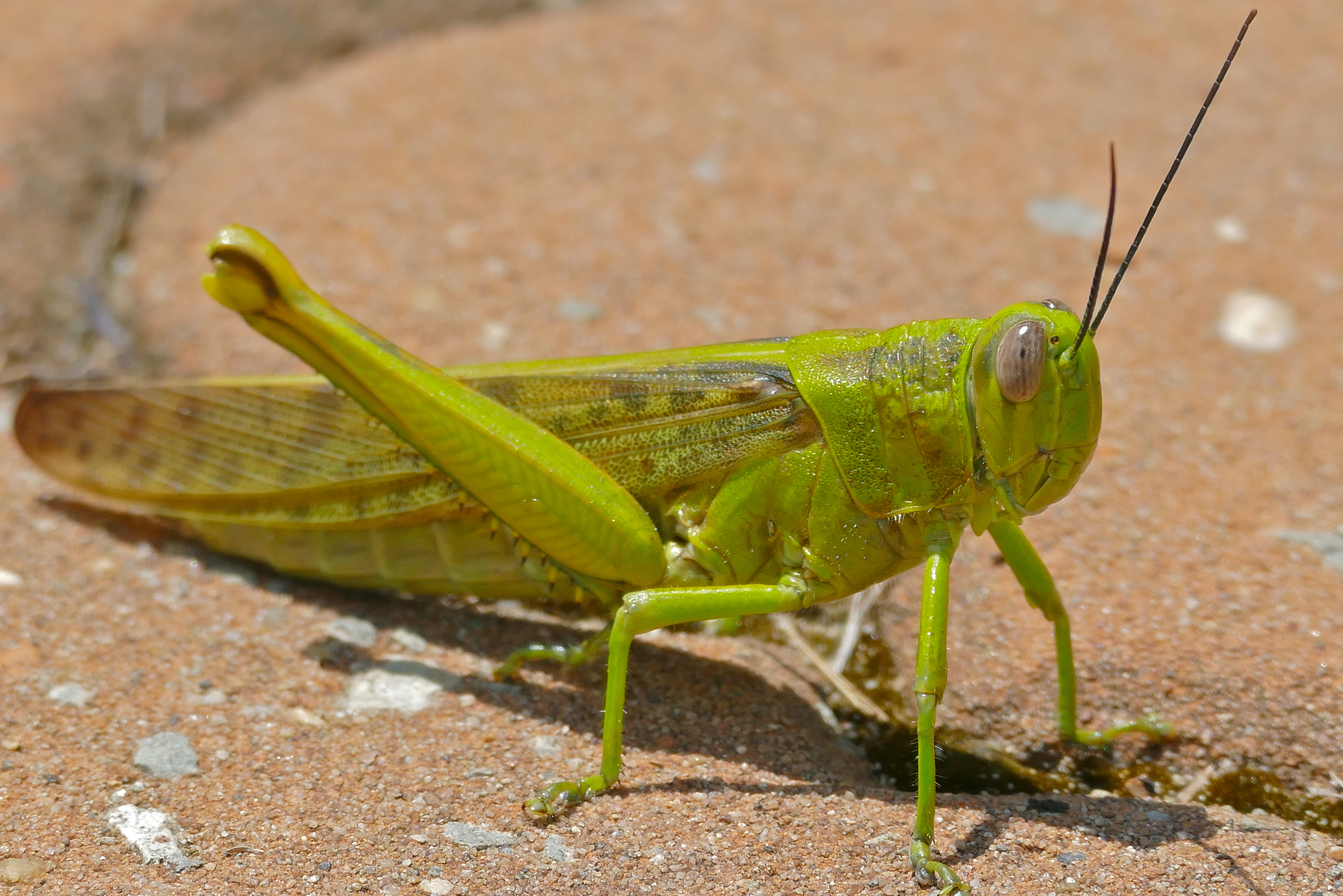

Conservation status
- Least Concern (IUCN 3.1)

Scientific classification
- Kingdom: Animalia
- Phylum: Arthropoda
- Clade: Pancrustacea
- Class: Insecta
- Order: Orthoptera
- Suborder: Caelifera
- Family: Acrididae
- Subfamily: Cyrtacanthacridinae
- Tribe: Cyrtacanthacridini
- Genus: Valanga
- Species: V. nigricornis

Binomial name
- Valanga nigricornis (Burmeister, 1838)

= Valanga nigricornis =

Javanese grasshopper

Species of grasshopper

Valanga nigricornis, the Javanese grasshopper (also known as the Javanese bird grasshopper), is a species of grasshopper in the subfamily Cyrtacanthacridinae of the family Acrididae. It is found in southeastern Asia, the type location being Singapore. It was first described by the German zoologist Hermann Burmeister in 1838. There are more than twenty subspecies, most of which are endemic to different island groups; the subspecies V. nigricornis nigricornis is the type for the genus Valanga.

== Description ==
There is considerable sexual dimorphism in this species with the males measuring 45 to 55 millimetres (1 3/4 to 2 1/8 in) in length and the females 15 to 75 mm (5/8 to 3 in). The adults are yellowish-brown, yellowish or green with bluish-black markings. The hind wings, which are visible in flight, are rose red. The nymphs are pale green with dark markings.

== Distribution ==
The Javanese grasshopper is native to Brunei, Cambodia, Indonesia, Malaysia, Papua New Guinea, the Philippines, Singapore, the Solomon Islands, Thailand, and Vietnam. It is mainly a woodland species and is found in forest clearings, on trees and shrubs. It can be a serious pest in oil palm and rubber plantations, which are commonly found throughout its native range. The species has also been recorded in Australia (Christmas Island only, it being 430 kilometres (267 mi) south of Java), Guam, India, Micronesia, and Palau.

== Life cycle ==
The life cycle of the Javanese grasshopper varies in different parts of its range, but in general, there is a single generation of insects each year. Up to four egg pods are laid in moist soil in forest clearings. When the eggs hatch, the nymphs pass through six or seven instar stages before becoming winged adults. Both nymphs and adults are diurnal and like to bask in the sun. They feed on tree foliage.

In Java the eggs remain dormant throughout the dry season and take six to eight months to hatch. After the nymphal stages they become immature adults which soon mature and start breeding. In Thailand, the eggs hatch after about two months, the nymphs grow during the wet season and remain as immature adults during the dry season. In west Malaysia there are two peak egg-laying periods, December/January and June/July, which suggests there are two physiological races present.

== Outbreaks ==
The Javanese grasshopper is not gregarious and is not known to form swarms. Nevertheless, it is much more locally common in some years than others and outbreaks occur particularly in dry years; heavy rain causes high levels of mortality among eggs and nymphs. In Java, an outbreak in 1915 was thought to be caused by a succession of dry years which encouraged synchronization of breeding in concentrated areas. Clearing of forests for cultivation may also promote breeding.

== Control ==
Trap cropping may help to control V. nigrocornis. Atim et al 1987 demonstrates the use of Pueraria phaseoloides in the protection of Hevea brasiliensis.

== Gallery ==
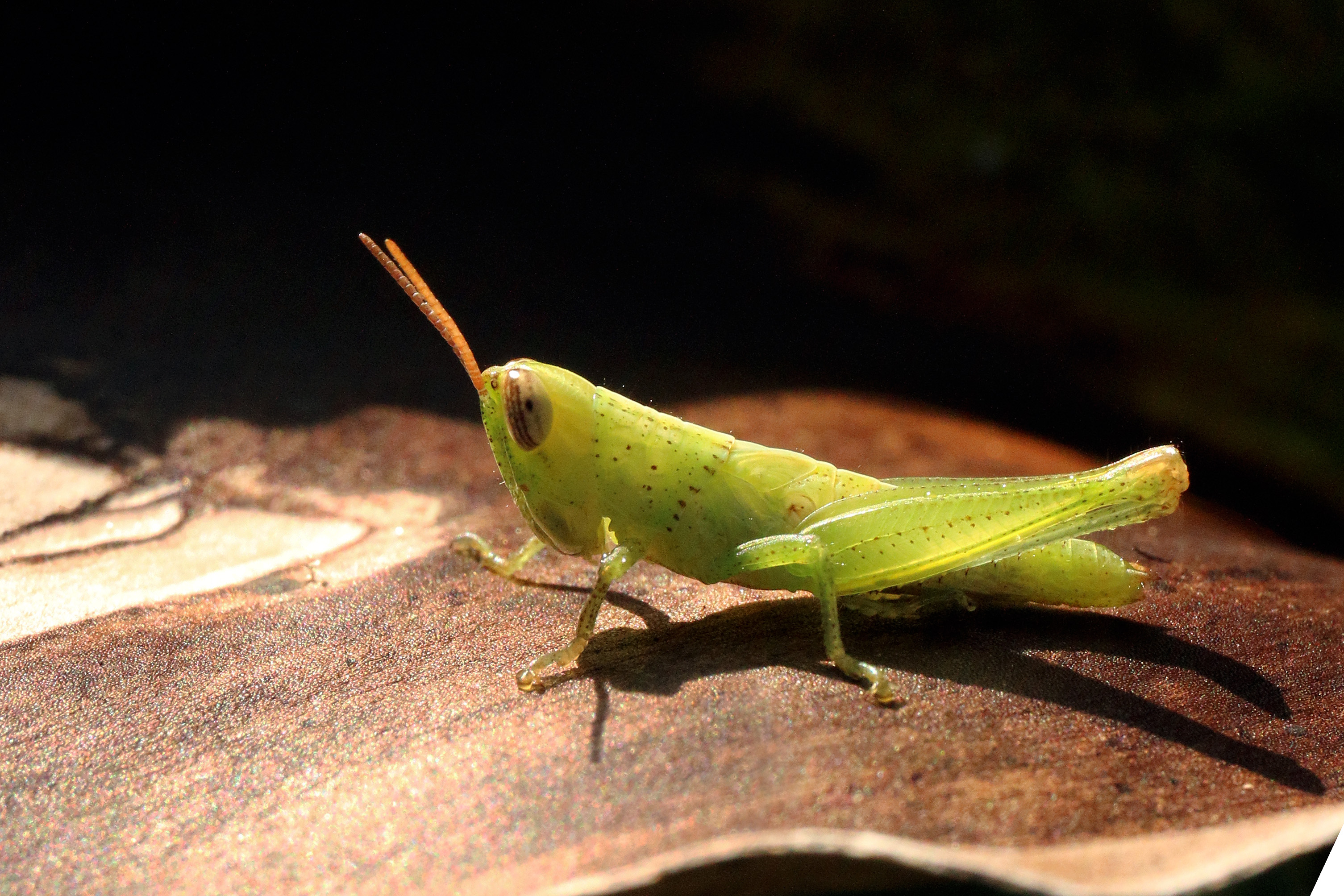
Nymph, Sabah, Borneo

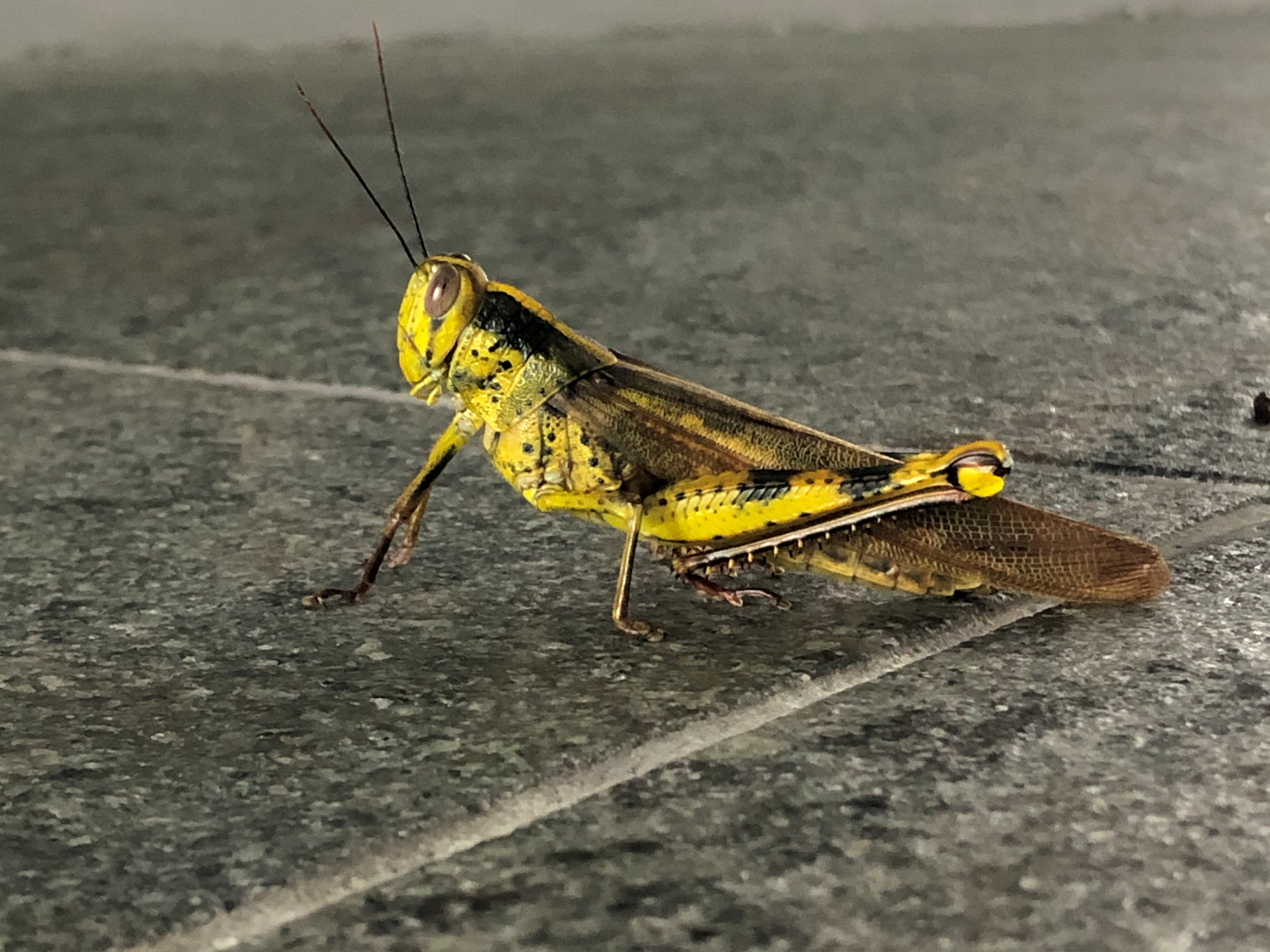
Adult female, Marina Bay, Singapore

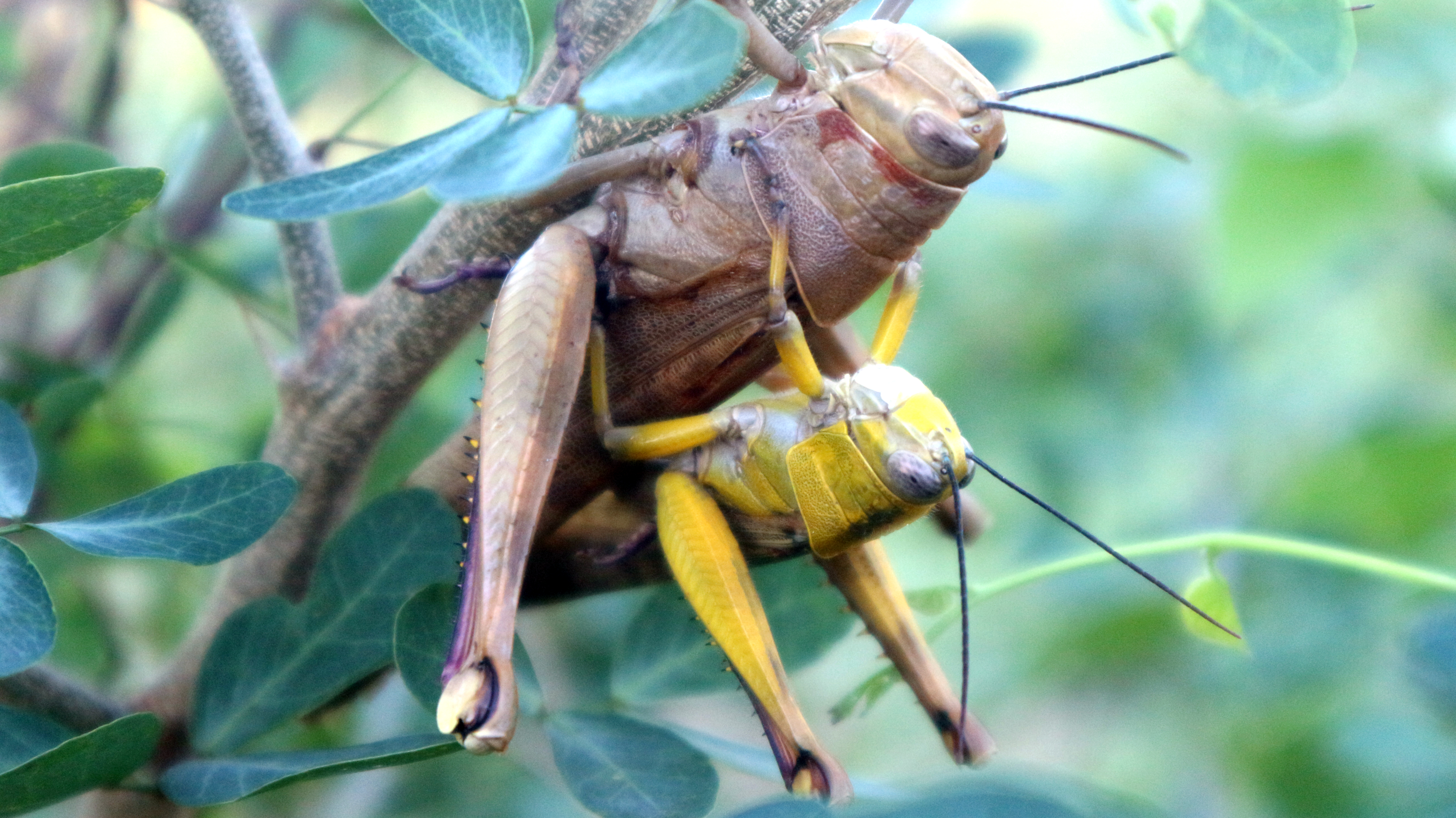
Female (larger) laying eggs, with male in attendance.
