= Shore Road Pumping Station =

Pumping station in Birkenhead, England

Coordinates: 53°23′43.5″N 3°0′45.5″W

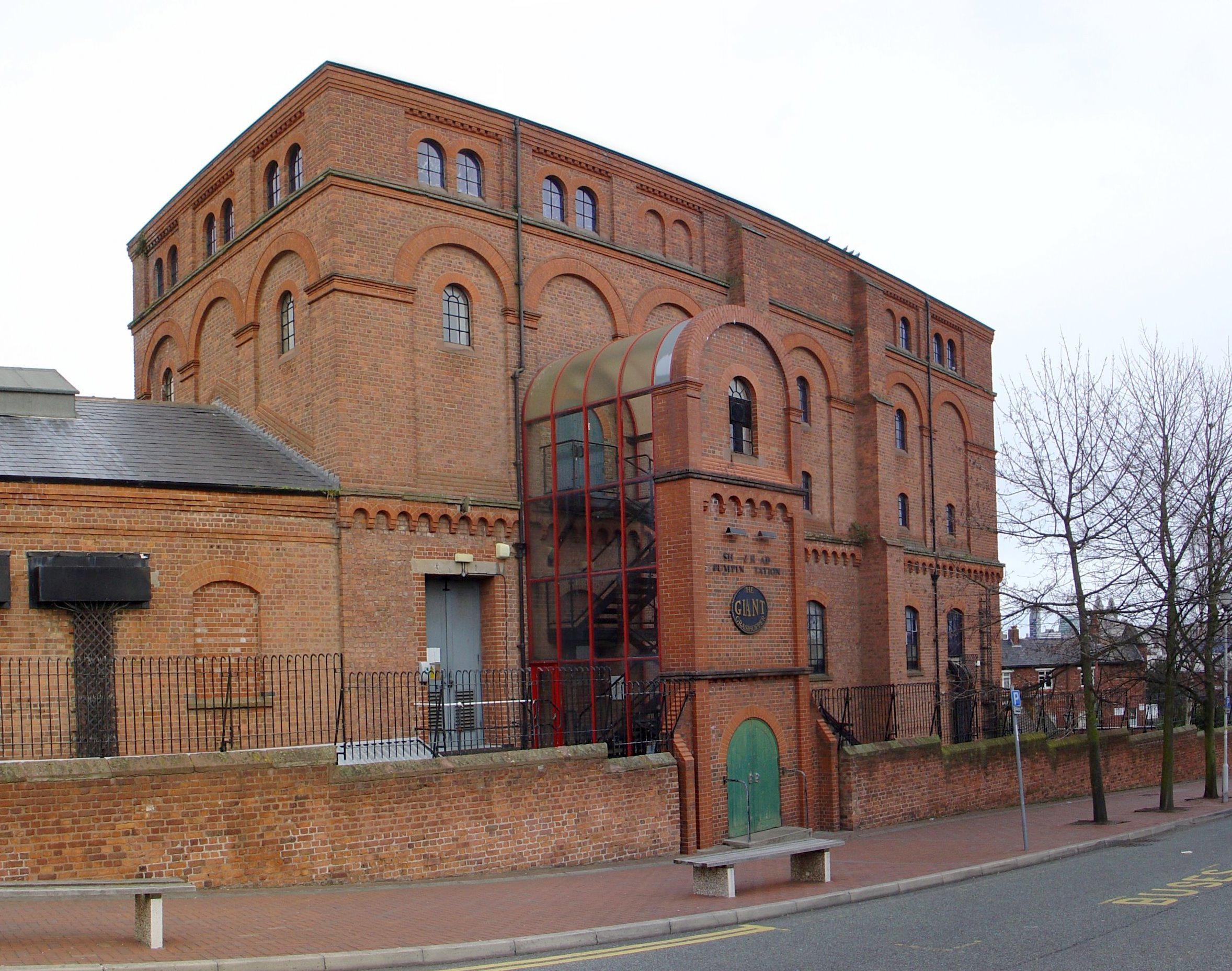
The Shore Road Pumping Station, Birkenhead

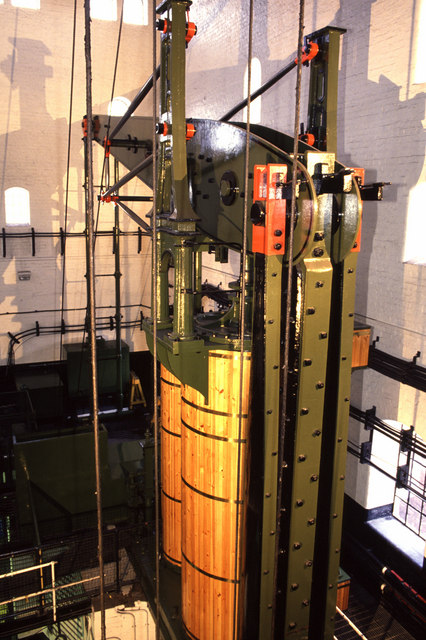
The 'Giant Grasshopper'

The Shore Road Pumping Station is a pumping station in Birkenhead, on the Wirral Peninsula, England.

It was designed by engineers James Brunlees and Charles Douglas Fox and built in the 1880s as part of the Mersey Railway. The building originally housed two steam powered beam engine pumps which removed water from the railway tunnel under the River Mersey. These had ceased working by 1959 when they were replaced by electric pumps. One of the engines, named the 'Giant Grasshopper', remains in situ and was restored to working condition.

The pumping station is a three-storeyed brick construction in the Italianate architectural style, with a Welsh slate roof. An external staircase, housed within a glass structure, was added to the front of the building in the late 1980s when being converted into a museum.

A similar building, the Mann Island Pumping Station, also still exists across the river in Liverpool.

Shore Road Pumping Station was granted Grade II listed status in 1992 and eventually became part of the Wirral Museum, with a period 1901 Birkenhead street scene reconstructed in the yard.

In 2009, as part of its Strategic Asset Review, owners Wirral Borough Council planned to sell the museum. Sometime after mid-2012 but before early 2014, the museum closed to the public.

In 2023, Big Heritage announced plans to reopen the Pumping Station for that years Heritage Open Days Scheme in September. They held open days which were very well received. The Pumping Station hasn't been open since however plans are still to reopen it on a more permanent basis.
