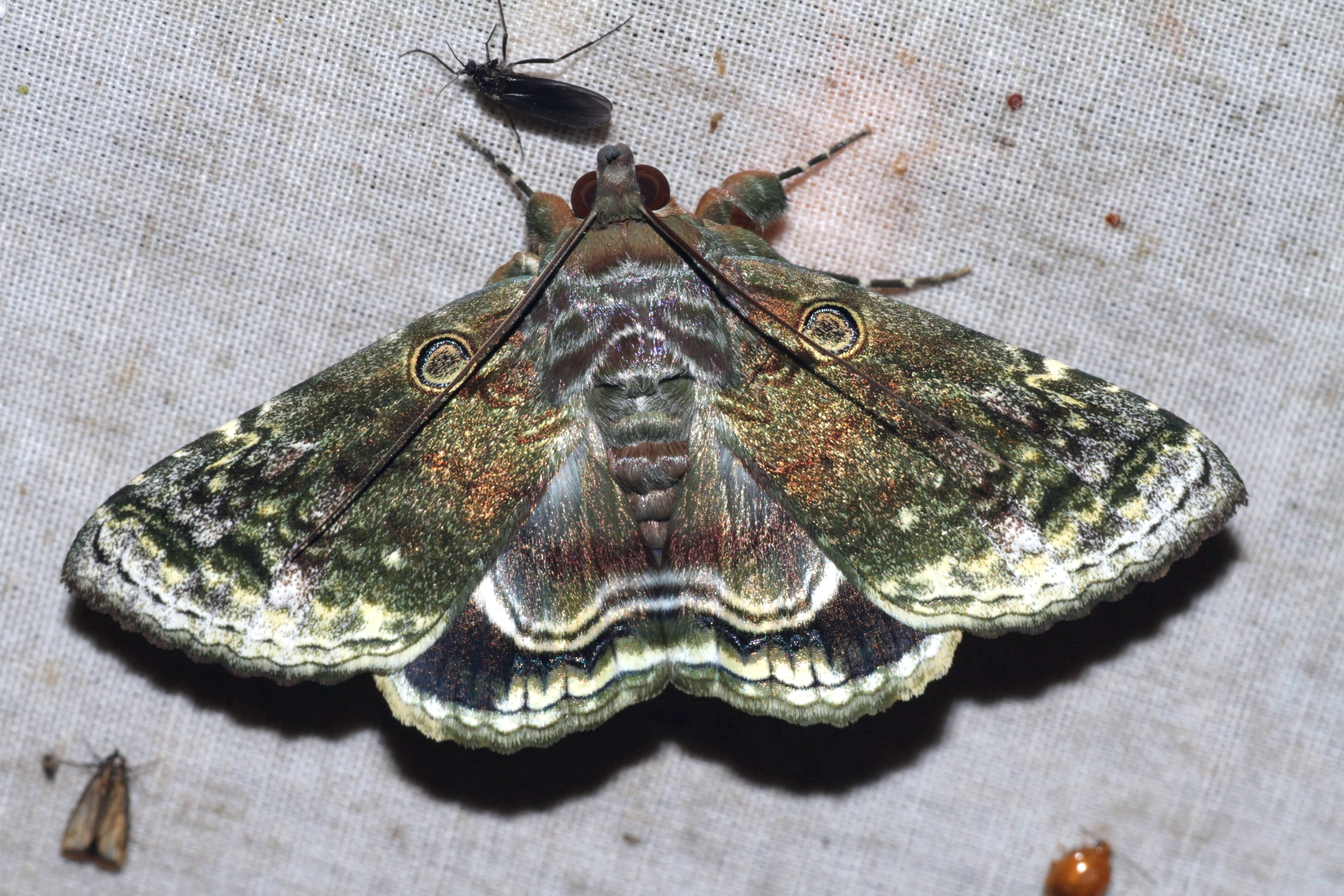
- Live specimen
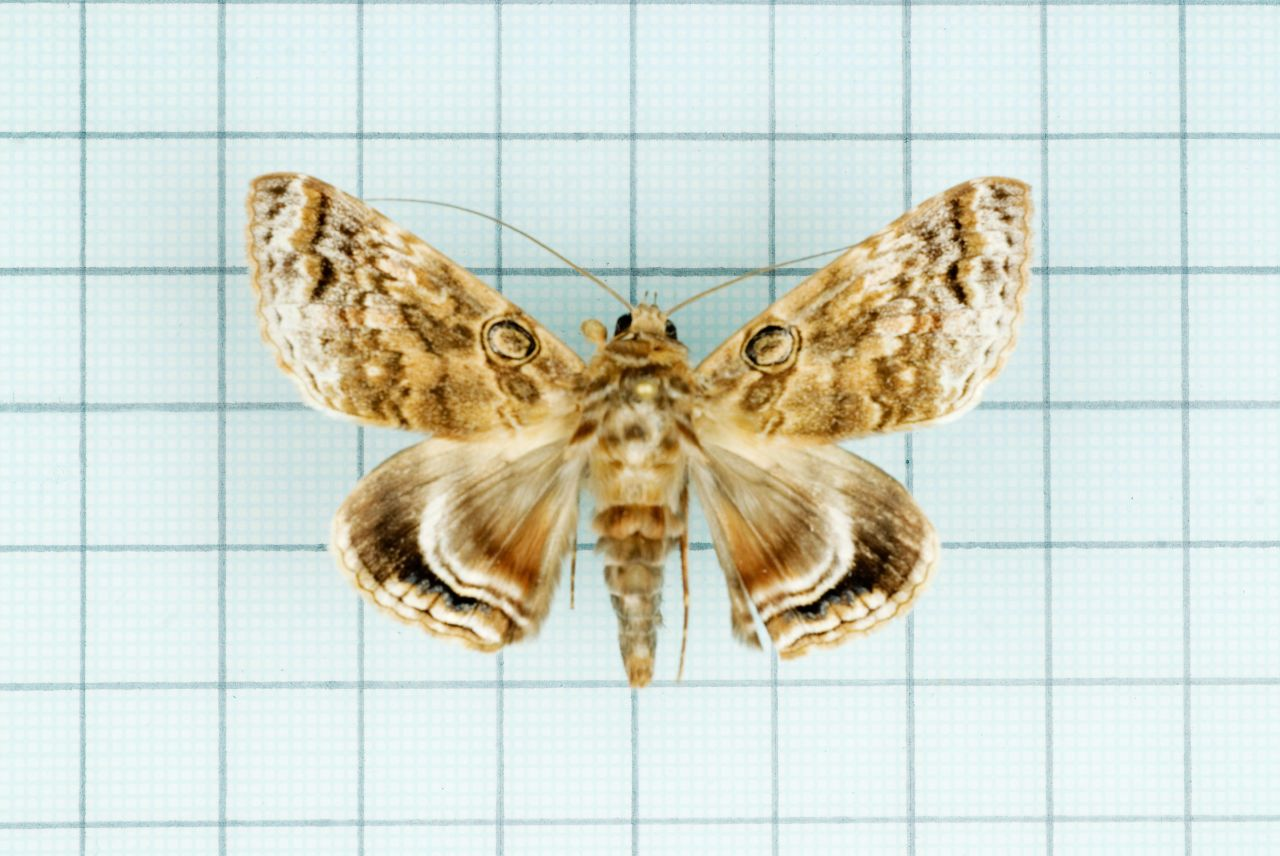
- Preserved specimen

Scientific classification
- Domain: Eukaryota
- Kingdom: Animalia
- Phylum: Arthropoda
- Class: Insecta
- Order: Lepidoptera
- Superfamily: Noctuoidea
- Family: Erebidae
- Genus: Cyclodes
- Species: C. omma

Binomial name
- Cyclodes omma (van der Hoeven, 1840)

Synonyms
- Erebus omma van der Hoeven, 1840; Beregra replenens Walker, 1858; Cyclodes omma pulchrior Prout, 1926

= Cyclodes omma =

Species of moth

Cyclodes omma is a moth of the family Erebidae. It is found from the Oriental tropics to the Moluccas, including India, Nepal, Vietnam, Cambodia, Myanmar, Thailand, Malaysia, Java, Bali, Sumatra, Timor, Sri Lanka, Flores, Sulawesi, the Philippines, China and Taiwan.

== Description ==
The wingspan is about 60–72 mm. Head, thorax and abdomen clothed with pale reddish-brown and greyish hair. Forewings pale golden brown with green reflexions. Outer area whitish. The apical area irrorated with purplish. A metallic blue ring-spot found below costa embraced by the double sinuous antemedial line. There are indistinct sinuous medial, post-medial, and submarginal lines. The medial line angled at lower end of cell, and postmedial line dentate from costa to vein 3. An almost marginal dark stria serie can be seen. Hindwings greyish fuscous with a curved postmedial white band and a dark line on it. Some blue marks can be seen with a whitish band beyond them towards anal angle. The apical area blackish and a marginal whitish band defined by brown lines. Ventral side with an indistinct lunulate postmedial pale line and traces of submarginal line, blackish towards costa of each wing.

The larvae have been recorded feeding on coconut, but also feed on other palm species. They bore deeply into young nuts and cause premature nut shedding.
