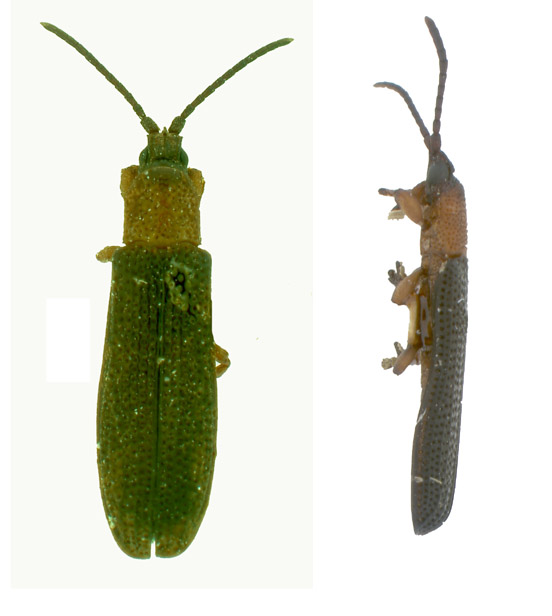

Scientific classification
- Kingdom: Animalia
- Phylum: Arthropoda
- Clade: Pancrustacea
- Class: Insecta
- Order: Coleoptera
- Suborder: Polyphaga
- Infraorder: Cucujiformia
- Family: Chrysomelidae
- Genus: Plesispa
- Species: P. reichei

Binomial name
- Plesispa reichei Chapuis, 1875

Synonyms
- Oxycephala papuana Gestro, 1897; Xiphispa obligata Weise, 1922; Bronthispa sumatrana Weise, 1924

= Plesispa reichei =

Species of beetle

Plesispa reichei is a species of beetle of the family Chrysomelidae. It is found in Australia (Queensland), Indonesia (Sulawesi, Java, Sumatra), Malaysia, New Britain, New Guinea, the Philippines (Basilan, Luzon, Mindanao, Negros), Sri Lanka and Thailand.

== Life history ==
The recorded host plants for this species are Cocos nucifera, Calamus species, Areca cathecu, Metroxylon sagu, Archontophoenix species, Daemonorops species, Korthalsia species, Flagellaria indica, Nipa fruticans, Roystonea regia, Arenga pinnata and Cyrtostachys renda.
