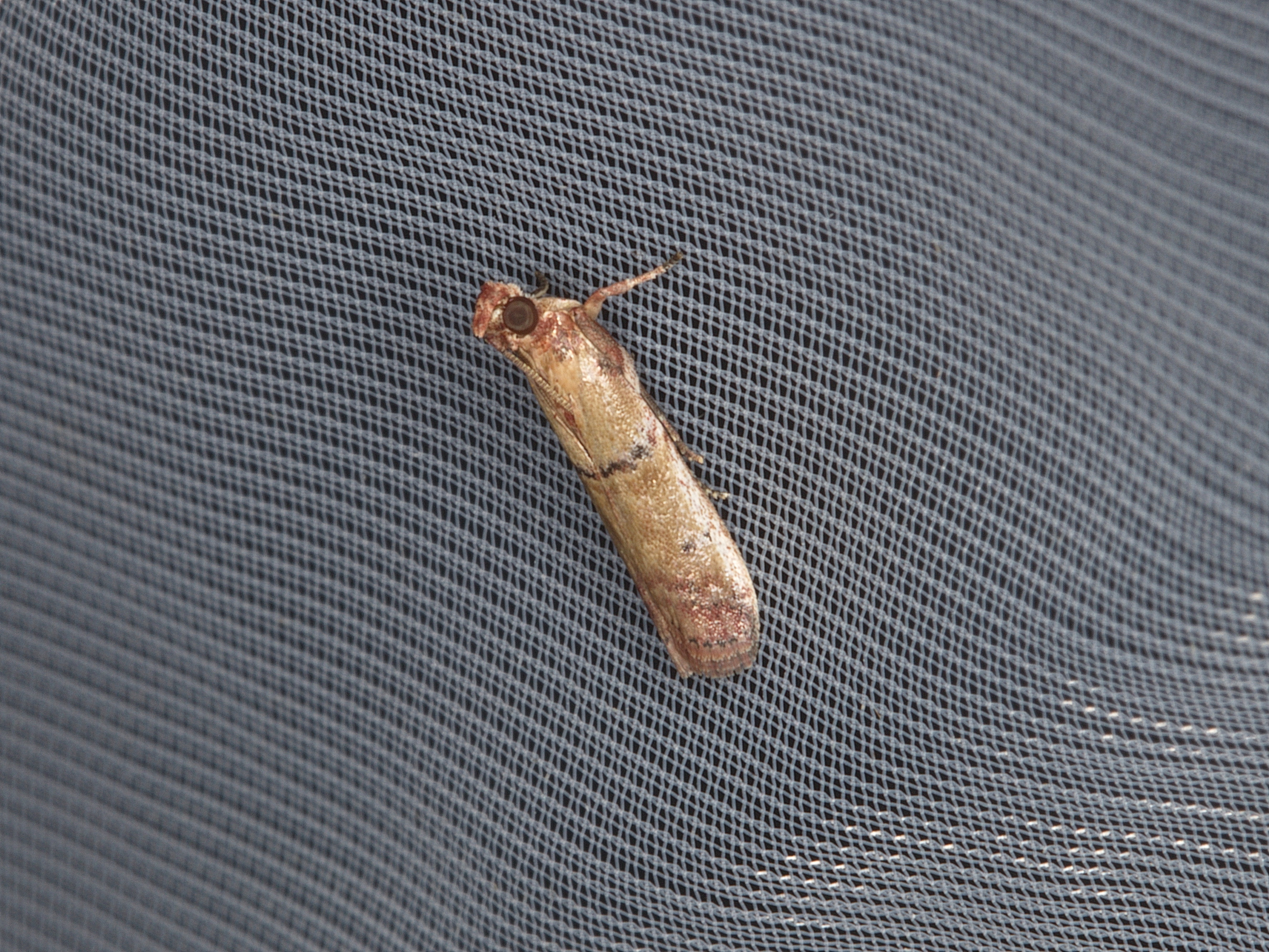

Scientific classification
- Kingdom: Animalia
- Phylum: Arthropoda
- Class: Insecta
- Order: Lepidoptera
- Family: Pyralidae
- Genus: Atheloca
- Species: A. subrufella

Binomial name
- Atheloca subrufella Hulst, 1887

Synonyms
- Nephopteryx subrufella Hulst, 1887; Nephopteryx filiolella Hulst, 1888; Hyalospila ptychis Dyar, 1919

= Atheloca subrufella =

Species of moth

Atheloca subrufella, the palm bud moth or coconut moth, is a species of snout moth described by George Duryea Hulst in 1887. It is found in the US states of Georgia and Florida, and in northern Mexico, Cuba, the Virgin Islands and Brazil.

The wingspan is 14–18 mm. Adults are brownish.

The larvae feed on various species in the family Arecaceae, including Cocos, Attalea, Syagrus, Sabal and Serenoa species. They are one of the most important coconut pests. Young larvae feed on the carpels of still-tender flowers or, if the flower has already been fertilized, they penetrate the developing coconut through the lower part of the bracts. In young coconuts, the larvae feed on the mesocarp, opening a series of galleries and causing premature shedding of fruits.

Female Atheloca subrufella release sex pheromones to signal mating and attract males. Both sexes select partners based on morphological and physiological traits, males tend to prefer the younger females with a higher reproductive potential. As a result, older females send sex pheromones earlier to improve the chance of attracting males and mating.
