= List of moths of Australia (Castniidae) =

Partial list of Australian moths

This is a list of the Australian species of the family Castniidae. It also acts as an index to the species articles and forms part of the full List of moths of Australia.

- Synemon austera Meyrick, 1891
- Synemon brontias Meyrick, 1891
- Synemon catocaloides Walker, 1865
- Synemon collecta Swinhoe, 1892
- Synemon directa Westwood, 1877
- Synemon discalis Strand, 1911
- Synemon gratiosa Westwood, 1877
- Synemon heliopis Meyrick, 1891
- Synemon jcaria R. Felder, 1874
- Synemon laeta Walker, 1854
- Synemon leucospila Meyrick, 1891
- Synemon magnifica Strand, 1911
- Synemon maja Strand, 1911
- Synemon nais Klug, 1850
- Synemon notha Westwood, 1877
- Synemon nupta Westwood, 1877
- Synemon obscurella Westwood, 1877
- Synemon parthenoides R. Felder, 1874
- Synemon phaeoptila Turner, 1906
- Synemon plana Walker, 1854
- Synemon selene Klug, 1850
- Synemon sophia (White, 1841)
- Synemon theresa Doubleday, 1846
- Synemon wulwulam Angel, 1951
