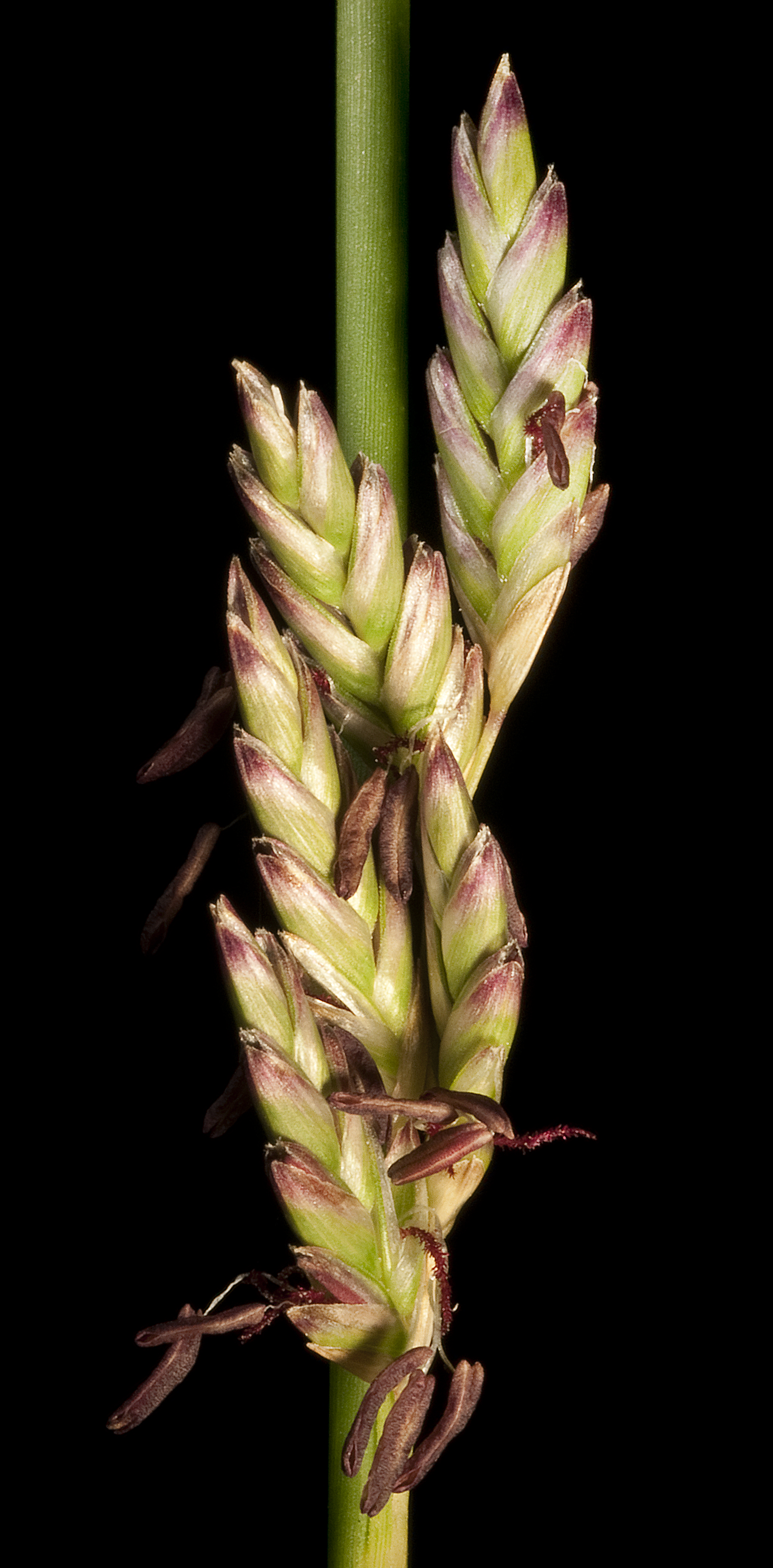
- Spartochloa scirpoidea

Scientific classification
- Kingdom: Plantae
- Clade: Tracheophytes
- Clade: Angiosperms
- Clade: Monocots
- Clade: Commelinids
- Order: Poales
- Family: Poaceae
- Clade: PACMAD clade
- Subfamily: Panicoideae
- Tribe: Cyperochloeae; L. Watson & Dallwitz ex Sánchez-Ken & L.G. Clark (2010)

Genera
- Cyperochloa; Spartochloa

Synonyms
- Cyperochloeae L. Watson & Dallwitz (1992, nom. nud.)

= Cyperochloeae =

Tribe of grasses

Cyperochloeae is a small tribe of grasses in the Panicoideae subfamily, found in Australia. It has only two species in two monotypic genera, Cyperochloa and Spartochloa. Cyperochloeae is sister to the tribe Thysanolaeneae. These two tribes, together with the Centotheceae, Steyermarkochloeae, Tristachyideae, Zeugiteae, and Chasmanthieae, form a monophyletic clade that is sister to the rest of the Panicoideae. They use the C_{3} photosynthetic pathway.
