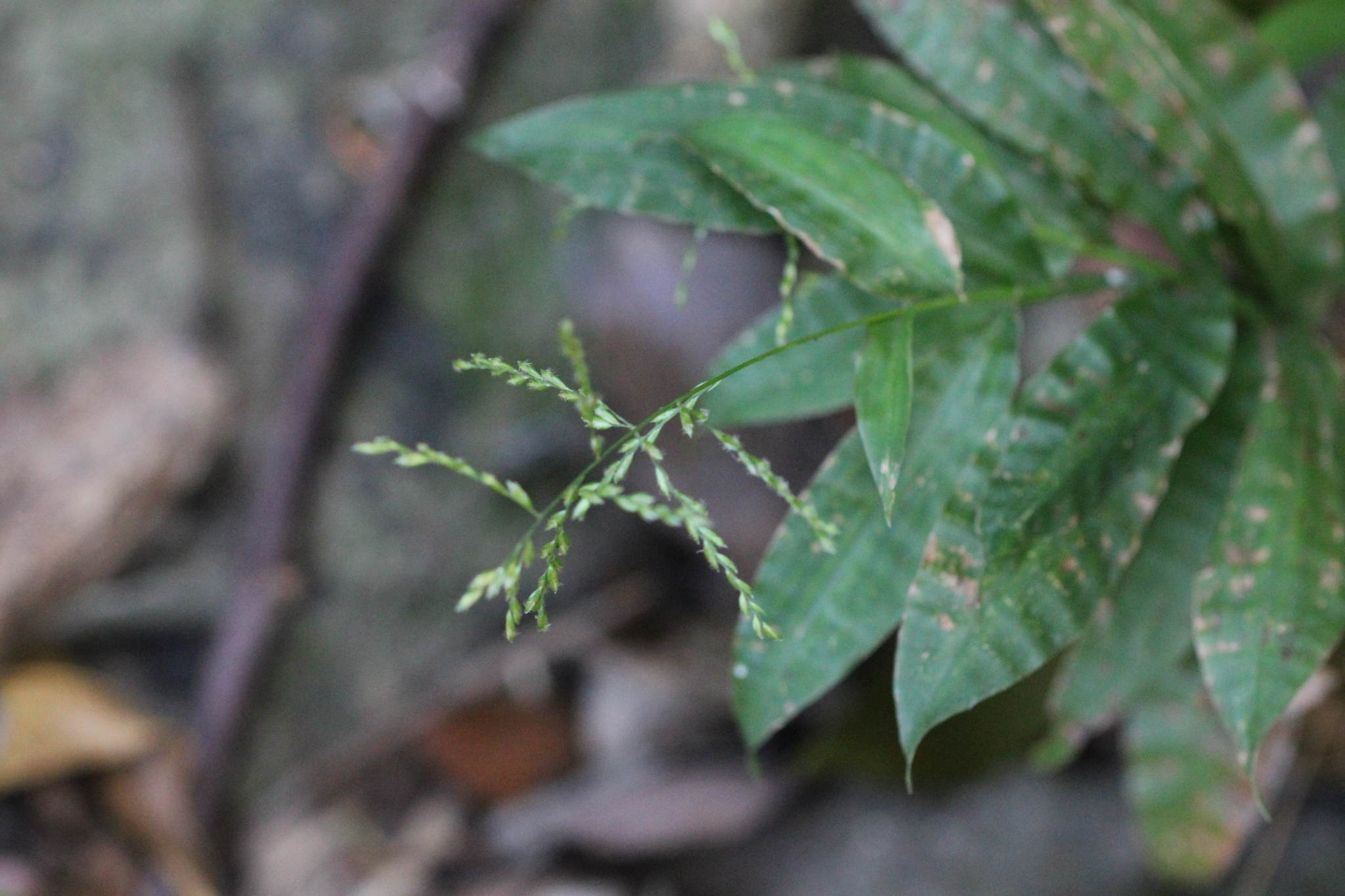
- Centotheca lappacea

Scientific classification
- Kingdom: Plantae
- Clade: Tracheophytes
- Clade: Angiosperms
- Clade: Monocots
- Clade: Commelinids
- Order: Poales
- Family: Poaceae
- Clade: PACMAD clade
- Subfamily: Panicoideae
- Tribe: Centotheceae; Ridl. (1907)

Genera
- Centotheca; Megastachya

Synonyms
- subtribe Centothecinae Benth. (1881)

= Centotheceae =

Tribe of grasses

Centotheceae is a small tribe of grasses with six species in two genera, distributed in Africa and Asia. It belongs to a group within the subfamily Panicoideae, sometimes referred to as "centothecoid clade", which consists of the tribes Thysanolaeneae, Cyperochloeae, Centotheceae, Chasmanthieae, Zeugiteae, Tristachyidae, and Steyermarkochloeae; this clade is sister to the remaining groups within Panicoideae. Unlike many other clades in the subfamily Panicoideae, they use the C_{3} photosynthetic pathway.
