= Megastachya =

Scientific classification
- Kingdom: Plantae
- Clade: Tracheophytes
- Clade: Angiosperms
- Clade: Monocots
- Clade: Commelinids
- Order: Poales
- Family: Poaceae
- Subfamily: Panicoideae
- Tribe: Centotheceae
- Genus: Megastachya; P.Beauv.

Type species
- Megastachya owariensis (syn of M. mucronata) P.Beauv.

Synonyms
- Magastachya P.Beauv., alternate spelling; Eragrostis unranked Megastachya (P. Beauv.) Nees; Eragrostis sect. Megastachya (P. Beauv.) Benth.; Eragrostis ser. Megastachyae (P. Beauv.) Benth. & Hook.f.; Eragrostis subsect. Megastachya (P. Beauv.) Benth.

Genus of grasses

Megastachya is a genus of African plants in the grass family.

Species

- Megastachya madagascariensis (Lam.) Chase – Madagascar
- Megastachya mucronata (Poir.) P.Beauv. – Madagascar, South Africa, Cameroon, Ethiopia, Central African Republic, Gabon, Kenya, Malawi, Zambia, Tanzania, etc.

Formerly included

numerous species once regarded as part of Megastachya but now considered better suited to other genera: Catapodium Desmostachya Distichlis Enteropogon Eragrostis Glyceria Halopyrum Leptochloa Poa
