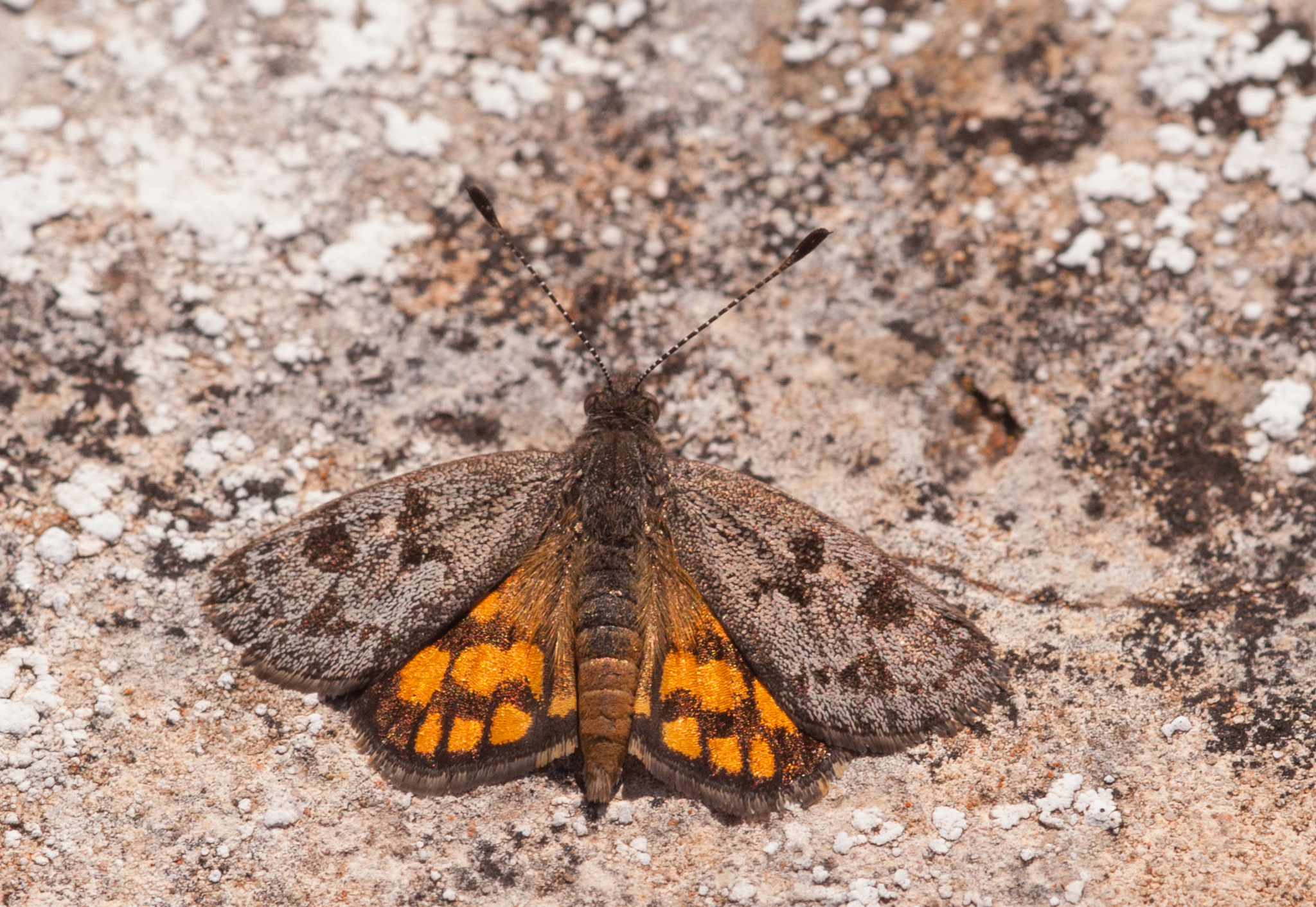
- Synemon discalis

Scientific classification
- Domain: Eukaryota
- Kingdom: Animalia
- Phylum: Arthropoda
- Class: Insecta
- Order: Lepidoptera
- Family: Castniidae
- Subfamily: Castniinae
- Tribe: Synemonini
- Genus: Synemon; Doubleday, 1846

Species
- See text

= Synemon =

Genus of moths

Synemon (commonly known as the Sun-moths) is a genus of moths within the family Castniidae. Edward Doubleday described it in 1846. The genus contains 24 described and 20 undescribed species. These species are found across mainland Australia and on Kangaroo Island, with the highest diversity in Western Australia. Synemon species can be found in a range of habitats, including woodlands, heathlands and native perennial grasslands. The adults fly during the daytime in warm to hot weather. They have clubbed antennae, and are often mistaken for butterflies.

Sun-moths typically have dull coloured forewings which, at rest, conceal their brightly coloured hindwings. They can use their hindwings to startle potential predators. All known larvae of sun-moths feed on monocotyledonous plants, such as Rytidosperma, Gahnia, Lepidosperma and Lomandra. Since European settlement, many species have suffered drastic reductions in their distributions due to habitat loss from agriculture and other threats. Some are listed as threatened, including Synemon plana, which is listed as critically endangered under the Australian Government Environment Protection and Biodiversity Conservation Act 1999.

== Species ==
The genus includes the following species:

- Synemon austera Meyrick, 1891
- Synemon brontias Meyrick, 1891
- Synemon catocaloides Walker, 1865
- Synemon collecta Swinhoe, 1892
- Synemon directa Westwood, 1877
- Synemon discalis Strand, 1911
- Synemon gratiosa Westwood, 1877
- Synemon heliopis Meyrick, 1891
- Synemon jcaria R. Felder, 1874
- Synemon laeta Walker, 1854
- Synemon leucospila Meyrick, 1891
- Synemon magnifica Strand, 1911
- Synemon maja Strand, 1911
- Synemon nais Klug, 1850
- Synemon notha Westwood, 1877
- Synemon nupta Westwood, 1877
- Synemon obscurella Westwood, 1877
- Synemon parthenoides R. Felder, 1874
- Synemon phaeoptila Turner, 1906
- Synemon plana Walker, 1854
- Synemon selene Klug, 1850
- Synemon sophia (White, 1841)
- Synemon theresa Doubleday, 1846
- Synemon wulwulam Angel, 1951
