= Synemon nais =

Scientific classification
- Kingdom: Animalia
- Phylum: Arthropoda
- Class: Insecta
- Order: Lepidoptera
- Family: Castniidae
- Genus: Synemon
- Species: S. nais

Binomial name
- Synemon nais Klug, 1850

Species of moth

Synemon nais, the orange sun-moth, is a moth in the Castniidae family. It is found in Australia, including Victoria, South Australia and south-eastern Western Australia.

The wingspan is about 27 mm for males and 30 mm for females.

Adults are on wing from mid-October to mid-November.

The larvae probably feed on Austrodanthonia setacea and Austrostipa species.
