= Cyperochloa =

Scientific classification
- Kingdom: Plantae
- Clade: Tracheophytes
- Clade: Angiosperms
- Clade: Monocots
- Clade: Commelinids
- Order: Poales
- Family: Poaceae
- Subfamily: Panicoideae
- Tribe: Cyperochloeae
- Genus: Cyperochloa; Lazarides & L.Watson
- Species: C. hirsuta

Binomial name
- Cyperochloa hirsuta Lazarides & L.Watson

Genus of grasses

Cyperochloa is a genus of Australian plants in the grass family. The only known species is Cyperochloa hirsuta, found in the Esperance Plains region of Western Australia.
