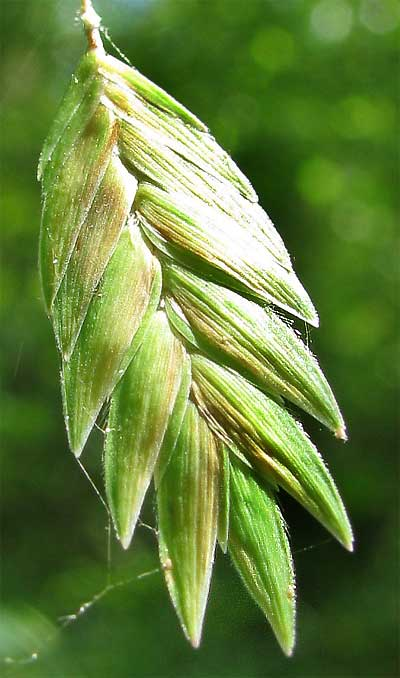
- Chasmanthium latifolium

Scientific classification
- Kingdom: Plantae
- Clade: Tracheophytes
- Clade: Angiosperms
- Clade: Monocots
- Clade: Commelinids
- Order: Poales
- Family: Poaceae
- Subfamily: Panicoideae
- Tribe: Chasmanthieae
- Genus: Chasmanthium; Link

Type species
- Chasmanthium gracile (Michx.) Link

Synonyms
- Gouldochloa J.Valdés, Morden & S.L.Hatch

= Chasmanthium =

Woodoats

Genus of grasses

Chasmanthium is a genus of North American plants in the grass family.

Members of the genus are commonly known as woodoats. One species, Chasmanthium latifolium, is commonly cultivated.

The generic name is derived from the Greek words χάσμα (chasma), meaning "wide opening," and ἀνθός (anthos), meaning "flower."

Species

- Chasmanthium curvifolium (Valdés-Reyna, Morden & S.L.Hatch) Wipff & S.D.Jones - Tamaulipas
- Chasmanthium latifolium (Michx.) H.O.Yates - Indian woodoats - central + southeastern United States (TX + FL to NE + NJ), plus isolated populations in Manitoba, Arizona, New Mexico, Nuevo León
- Chasmanthium laxum (L.) H.O.Yates - slender woodoats - southeastern + south-central United States (TX + FL to NY)
- Chasmanthium nitidum (Baldw.) Yates - shiny woodoats - southeastern United States (AL GA FL NC SC)
- Chasmanthium ornithorhynchum (Steud.) Yates - birdbill woodoats - southeastern United States (LA MS AL FL NC SC)

== See also ==
- List of Poaceae genera
