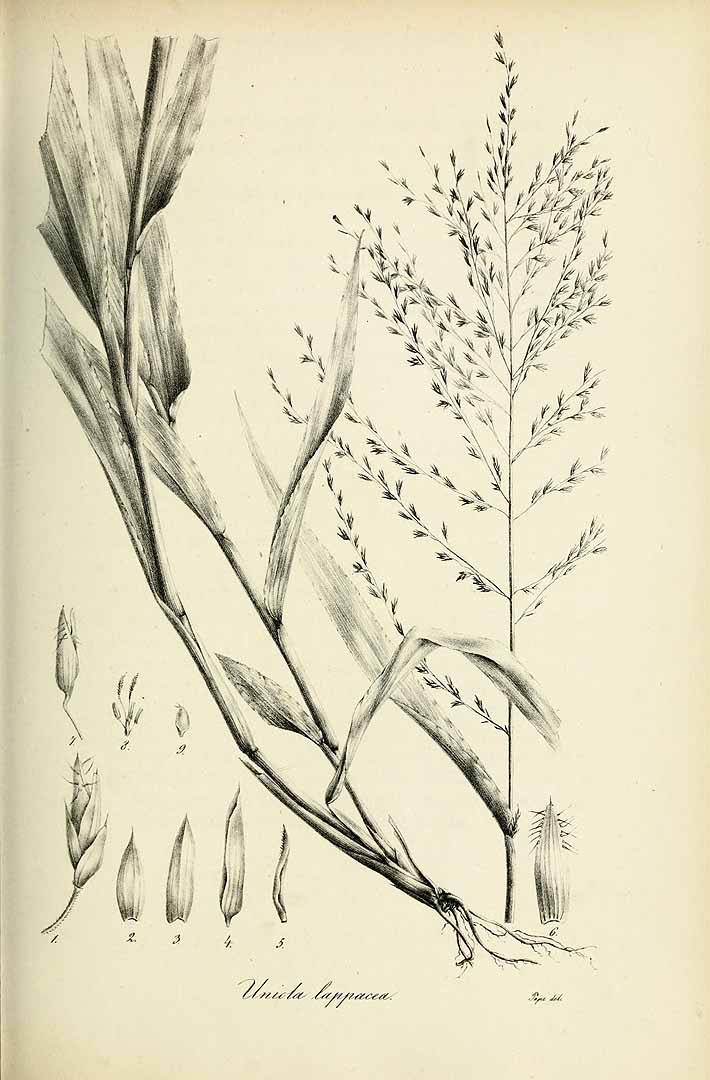
- Centotheca lappacea

Scientific classification
- Kingdom: Plantae
- Clade: Tracheophytes
- Clade: Angiosperms
- Clade: Monocots
- Clade: Commelinids
- Order: Poales
- Family: Poaceae
- Subfamily: Panicoideae
- Tribe: Centotheceae
- Genus: Centotheca; Desv. (1810)

Synonyms
- Ramosia Merr.; Centosteca Desv., alternate spelling

= Centotheca =

Genus of grasses

Centotheca is a genus of African, Asian, and Pacific Island plants in the grass family.

Species

- Centotheca ganeshaiahiana - Andaman and Nicobar islands
- Centotheca lappacea (L.) Desv. - tropical western + central Africa; Madagascar, China, Southeast Asia, New Guinea, numerous islands of the Pacific a.k.a. หญ้า ฮี ยุ่ม hee yum grass in Thai
- Centotheca philippinensis (Merr.) C.Monod - Philippines, New Guinea
- Centotheca uniflora Swallen - Vietnam

formerly included

- Centotheca madagascariensis - Megastachya madagascariensis
- Centotheca malabarica - Diplachne fusca
- Centotheca maxima - Megastachya mucronata
- Centotheca mucronata - Megastachya mucronata
- Centotheca owariensis - Megastachya mucronata
- Centotheca urekana - Megastachya mucronata

== See also ==
- List of Poaceae genera
