= Bromuniola =

Scientific classification
- Kingdom: Plantae
- Clade: Tracheophytes
- Clade: Angiosperms
- Clade: Monocots
- Clade: Commelinids
- Order: Poales
- Family: Poaceae
- Subfamily: Panicoideae
- Tribe: Chasmanthieae
- Genus: Bromuniola; Stapf & C.E.Hubb.
- Species: B. gossweileri

Binomial name
- Bromuniola gossweileri Stapf & C.E.Hubb.

Genus of grasses

Bromuniola is a genus of Central African plants in the grass family. The only known species is Bromuniola gossweileri, native to Zaïre, Tanzania, Angola, and Zambia.

== See also ==
- List of Poaceae genera
