= Synemon heliopis =

Scientific classification
- Kingdom: Animalia
- Phylum: Arthropoda
- Class: Insecta
- Order: Lepidoptera
- Family: Castniidae
- Genus: Synemon
- Species: S. heliopis

Binomial name
- Synemon heliopis Meyrick, 1891

Species of moth

Synemon heliopis is a moth in the Castniidae family. It is found in Australia, including Western Australia.

The larvae probably feed on the roots of Ecdeiocolea monostachya and Spartochloa scirpoidea.
