= Synemon selene =

Scientific classification
- Domain: Eukaryota
- Kingdom: Animalia
- Phylum: Arthropoda
- Class: Insecta
- Order: Lepidoptera
- Family: Castniidae
- Genus: Synemon
- Species: S. selene

Binomial name
- Synemon selene Klug, 1850

Synonyms
- Synemon adelaida Swinhoe, 1892

Species of moth

Synemon selene, the pale sun-moth, is a moth in the Castniidae family. It is found in Australia, including Victoria and South Australia.

The wingspan is about 35 mm for males and 47 mm for females.

Adults have been recorded from early February to early March.

The larvae probably feed on the roots of Austrodanthonia setacea.
