= Synemon austera =

Scientific classification
- Kingdom: Animalia
- Phylum: Arthropoda
- Class: Insecta
- Order: Lepidoptera
- Family: Castniidae
- Genus: Synemon
- Species: S. austera

Binomial name
- Synemon austera Meyrick, 1891

Species of moth

Synemon austera is a moth in the Castniidae family. It is found in Australia, including Western Australia.
