= Synemon jcaria =

Scientific classification
- Domain: Eukaryota
- Kingdom: Animalia
- Phylum: Arthropoda
- Class: Insecta
- Order: Lepidoptera
- Family: Castniidae
- Genus: Synemon
- Species: S. jcaria

Binomial name
- Synemon jcaria R. Felder, 1874

Species of moth

Synemon jcaria, the reddish-orange sun-moth, is a moth in the Castniidae family. It is found in Australia, including Victoria.

The wingspan is about 35 mm for males and 38 mm for females.

Adults are on wing from late January to mid March.

The larvae feed on Lomandra effusa.
