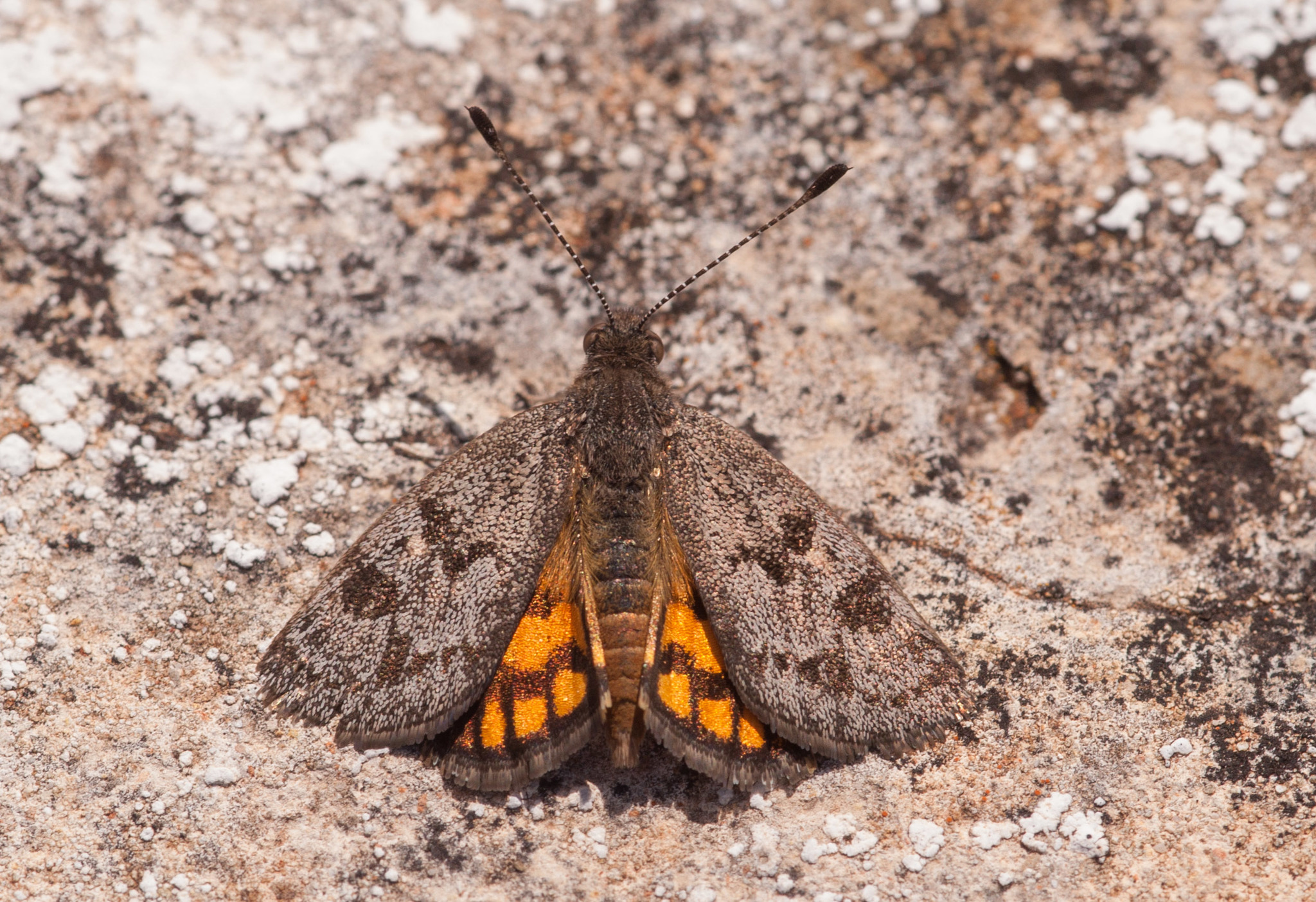

Scientific classification
- Domain: Eukaryota
- Kingdom: Animalia
- Phylum: Arthropoda
- Class: Insecta
- Order: Lepidoptera
- Family: Castniidae
- Genus: Synemon
- Species: S. discalis

Binomial name
- Synemon discalis Strand, 1911

= Synemon discalis =

Species of moth

Synemon discalis, the small orange-spotted sun-moth, is a moth in the Castniidae family. It is found in Australia, including South Australia, Western Australia and Victoria.

The wingspan is about 31 mm for males and 35 mm for females.
