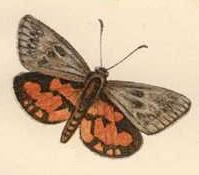

Scientific classification
- Kingdom: Animalia
- Phylum: Arthropoda
- Class: Insecta
- Order: Lepidoptera
- Family: Castniidae
- Genus: Synemon
- Species: S. catocaloides

Binomial name
- Synemon catocaloides Walker, 1865

= Synemon catocaloides =

Species of moth

Synemon catocaloides is a moth in the Castniidae family. It is found in Australia, including northern Western Australia.

The larvae probably feed on the roots of Ecdeiocolea monostachya.
