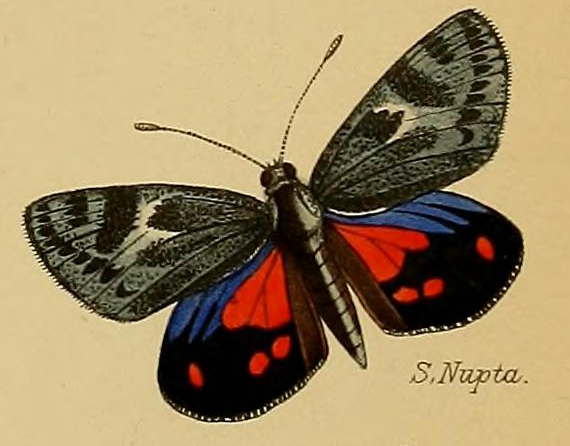
- Mounted specimen illustrated in the original description

Scientific classification
- Kingdom: Animalia
- Phylum: Arthropoda
- Class: Insecta
- Order: Lepidoptera
- Family: Castniidae
- Genus: Synemon
- Species: S. nupta

Binomial name
- Synemon nupta Westwood, 1877

Synonyms
- Synemon pyrrhoptera Lower, 1892

= Synemon nupta =

Species of moth

Synemon nupta is a moth in the Castniidae family. It is found in Australia, including Western Australia.

The head and body are brown, the abdomen with some reddish suffusions. The forewings are brown and densely suffused with greyish white in some parts, leaving places not suffused and thus forming a medial band deeply elbowed outwardly in its centre. The hindwings are bright deep black, bright crimson in the centre, enclosing a short discal black band which runs into the black outer margin before the middle, leaving a crimson sub-apical discal spot. The underside of both wings is black, on the forewings suffused with crimson on the basal half of the costal space.
