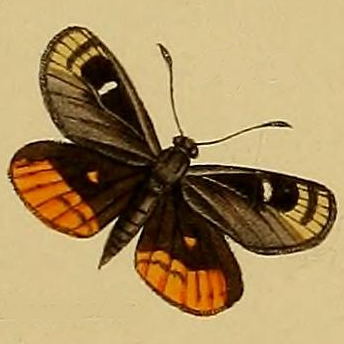
- Mounted specimen illustrated in the original description

Scientific classification
- Kingdom: Animalia
- Phylum: Arthropoda
- Clade: Pancrustacea
- Class: Insecta
- Order: Lepidoptera
- Family: Castniidae
- Genus: Synemon
- Species: S. obscurella

Binomial name
- Synemon obscurella Westwood, 1877

Synonyms
- Synemon obscura

= Synemon obscurella =

Species of butterfly

Synemon obscurella is a moth in the Castniidae family. It is found in Australia, including Western Australia.
