= Synemon laeta =

Scientific classification
- Kingdom: Animalia
- Phylum: Arthropoda
- Class: Insecta
- Order: Lepidoptera
- Family: Castniidae
- Genus: Synemon
- Species: S. laeta

Binomial name
- Synemon laeta Walker, 1854

Synonyms
- Synemon vagans Westwood, 1877

Species of moth

Synemon laeta is a moth in the Castniidae family. It is found along the east coast of Queensland, Australia.

The larvae feed on Lomandra longifolia. They feed inside the culm of the food plant at ground level.
