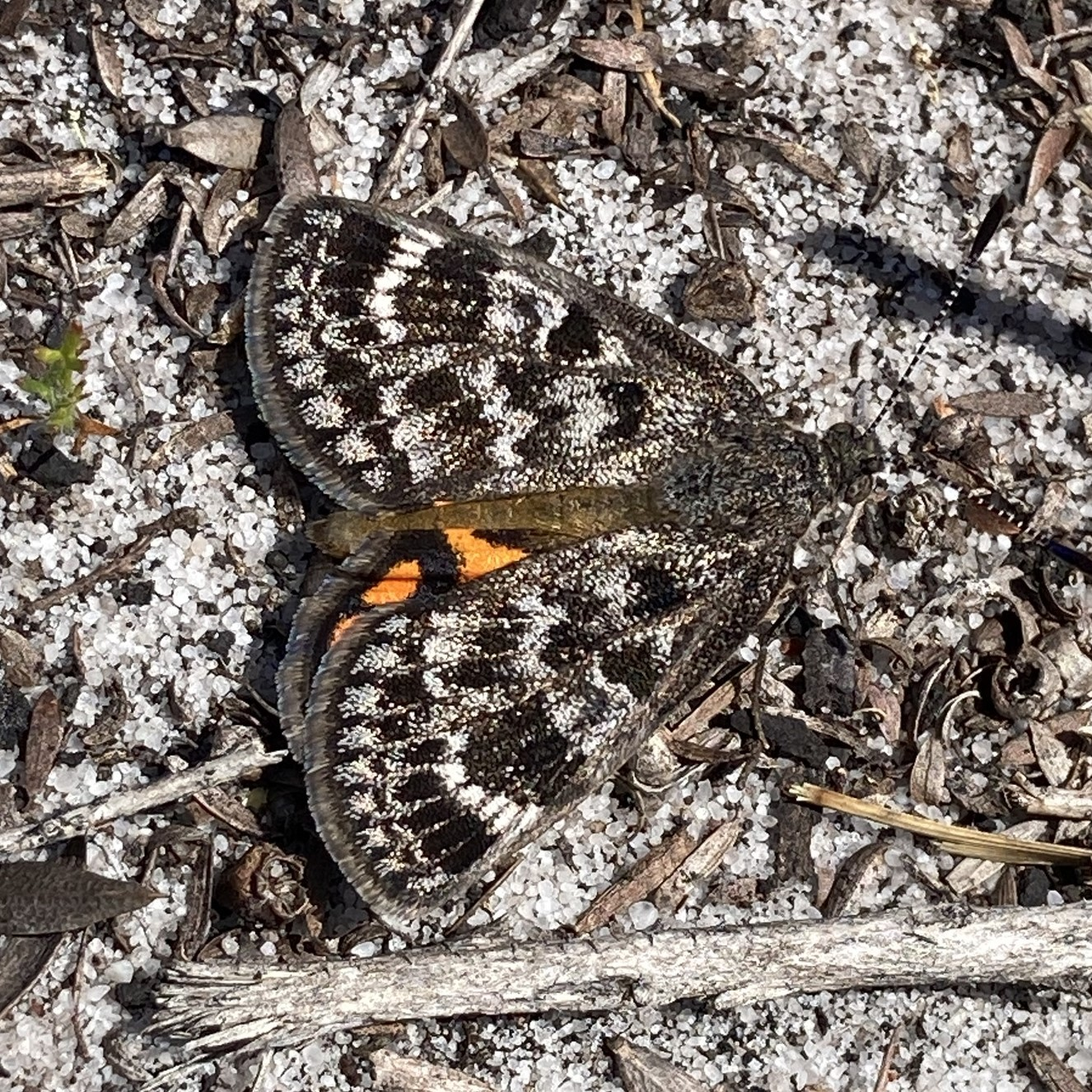

Scientific classification
- Domain: Eukaryota
- Kingdom: Animalia
- Phylum: Arthropoda
- Class: Insecta
- Order: Lepidoptera
- Family: Castniidae
- Genus: Synemon
- Species: S. sophia

Binomial name
- Synemon sophia (White, 1841)

Synonyms
- Hesperia sophia White, 1841

= Synemon sophia =

Species of moth

Synemon sophia is a species of moth in the family Castniidae. It is found in Australia, including Western Australia, Victoria and South Australia.

== Description ==
The anterior wings of the male are brown, clouded with grey and fuscous brown. There is a dark cloud near the base and another at the end of the discoidal cell followed by a white dot. The posterior wings are black, the base with an oval yellow spot, a macular yellow band beyond the middle, followed by a series of yellow spots. The head is greyish and the antennae are black varied with white. The thorax is grey and the abdomen is black at the base, but whitish beyond. The anterior wings of the female are nearly black, clouded with light bluish-grey scales, on the margin arranged into a band divided by a series of black spots. The posterior wings are black, with a large orange spot near the base, followed by a broad abbreviated, transverse band, commencing on the abdominal margin and succeeded by a large rounded spot of the same colour; between these and the outer margin a series of three or four orange spots. The head is dark grey, the palpi nearly white and the antennae black, ringed with white. The abdomen is pale fulvous.
