= Synemon wulwulam =

Scientific classification
- Domain: Eukaryota
- Kingdom: Animalia
- Phylum: Arthropoda
- Class: Insecta
- Order: Lepidoptera
- Family: Castniidae
- Genus: Synemon
- Species: S. wulwulam

Binomial name
- Synemon wulwulam Angel, 1951

Species of moth

Synemon wulwulam is a moth in the Castniidae family. It is found in Australia, including Western Australia, Northern Territory and Queensland.

The larvae probably feed on the roots of Chrysopogon fallax.
