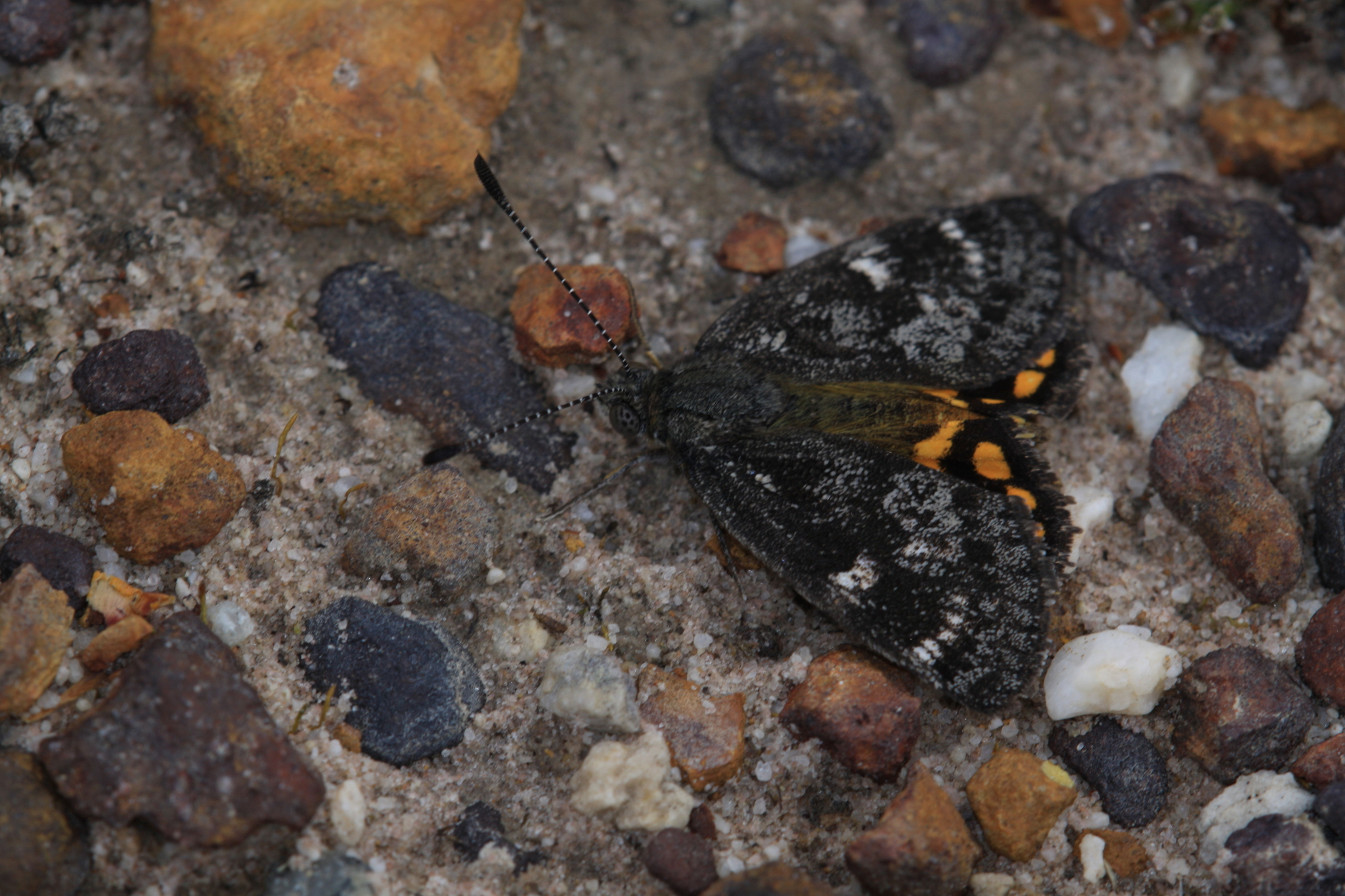

Scientific classification
- Kingdom: Animalia
- Phylum: Arthropoda
- Class: Insecta
- Order: Lepidoptera
- Family: Castniidae
- Genus: Synemon
- Species: S. leucospila

Binomial name
- Synemon leucospila Meyrick, 1891

= Synemon leucospila =

Species of moth

Synemon leucospila, the yellow-spotted sun moth, is a moth in the Castniidae family. It is found in Australia, including Western Australia.
