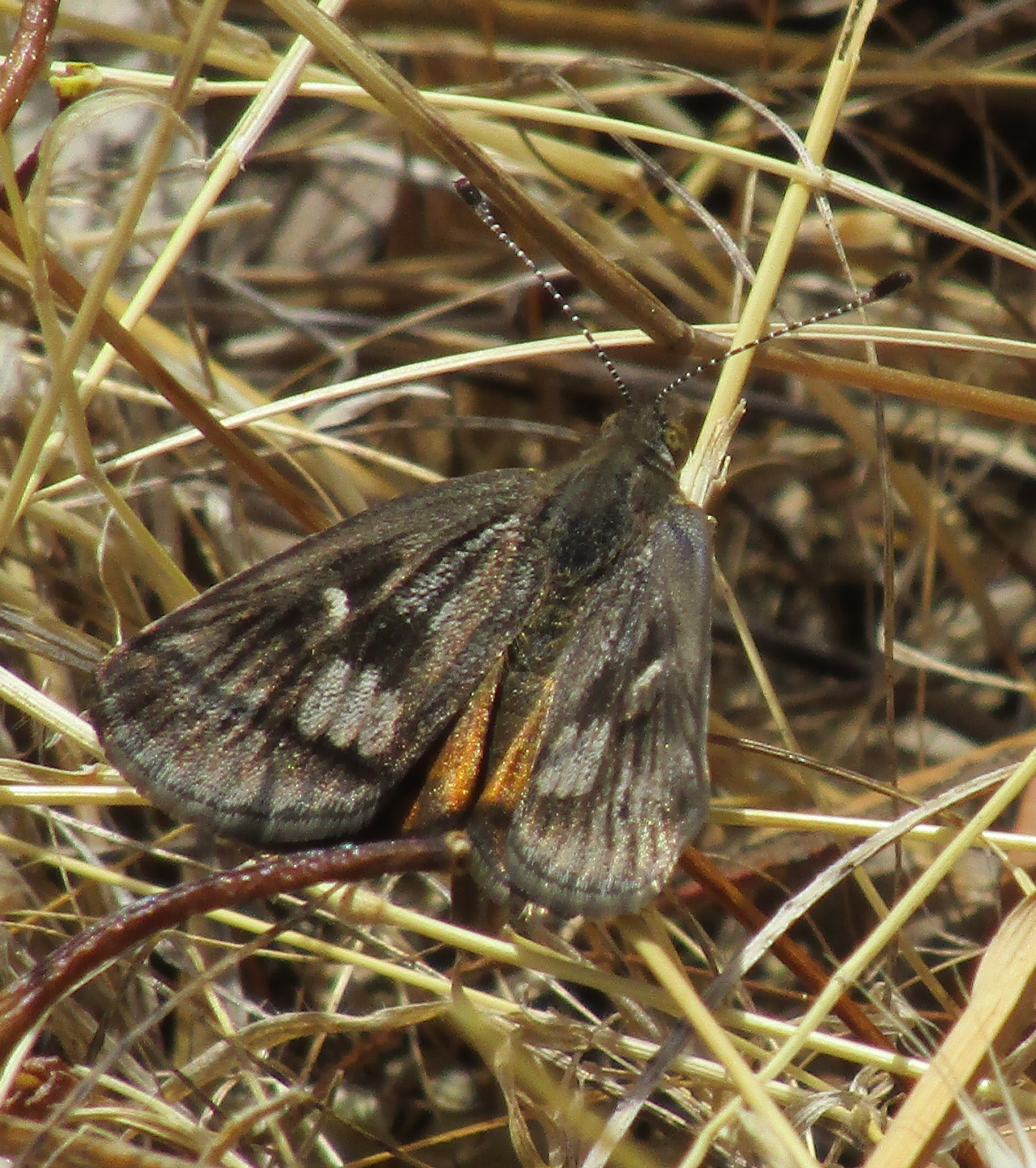

Scientific classification
- Kingdom: Animalia
- Phylum: Arthropoda
- Class: Insecta
- Order: Lepidoptera
- Family: Castniidae
- Genus: Synemon
- Species: S. theresa

Binomial name
- Synemon theresa Doubleday, 1846

Synonyms
- Synemon mopsa Doubleday, 1846; Synemon livida Tepper, 1882; Synemon obscura Tepper, 1882

= Synemon theresa =

Species of moth

Synemon theresa, the cryptic sun-moth, is a species of day-flying moth of the family Castniidae. It was described by Edward Doubleday in 1846. It has a wingspan of 26-40mm, and is mostly grey-brown with orange hindwings. Native to Australia, this species is extinct in Victoria, and is now only known from a relatively small area of South Australia near Adelaide. It uses Themeda triandra (kangaroo grass) and Rytidopserma spp. (Wallaby Grasses) as larval food plants. Adults can be found from November to February. They only live for a few days, as they do not have a feeding proboscis. Despite becoming extinct over much of its former range, the cryptic sun-moth is not listed as a threatened species in South Australia.

== Taxonomy ==
Synemon theresa was first described by Edward Doubleday in 1846. The type species is from the Adelaide region. It has been given the common name of Cryptic Sun-moth due to its subtle colouration and elusive nature.

== Description ==
Males have a wingspan of 26-34mm, and females have a wingspan of 30-40mm. The head, thorax and abdomen are grey above, whitish below. The antennae are black with white rings.

The forewing uppersides are predominantly brown, with a whitish spot in the middle. The forewing undersides are mostly dull orange with a row of small black spots near their outer edges. The hindwings are dull orange on the uppersides, with a row of brown spots near the outer edges. They have a brownish inner area that encloses a dull orange spot. The undersides of the hindwings are brownish-black with orange for the male, and grey with orange for the female. She also has a row of black spots near the edges of her hindwing undersides. The species has dark and pale forms.

== Distribution and habitat ==
Synemon theresa once occurred across a large part of Victoria, with records from Castlemaine, Ararat and Beechworth. However, it has not been recorded in Victoria for over one hundred years, and is presumed extinct in that state. S. theresa can now only be found in South Australia. It has been recorded near Clare in the 1960s, but it is now believed to only occur in the western hills face area of the Mount Lofty Ranges, near Adelaide. It inhabits grassy open woodland habitat which contains its larval food plants. These include Themeda triandra (kangaroo grass), Rytidosperma racemosum (narrow-head wallaby grass) and Rytidosperma caespitosum (common wallaby grass). This moth seems to prefer native grass that is lightly grazed or mown, and is in active green growth.

== Behaviour and ecology ==
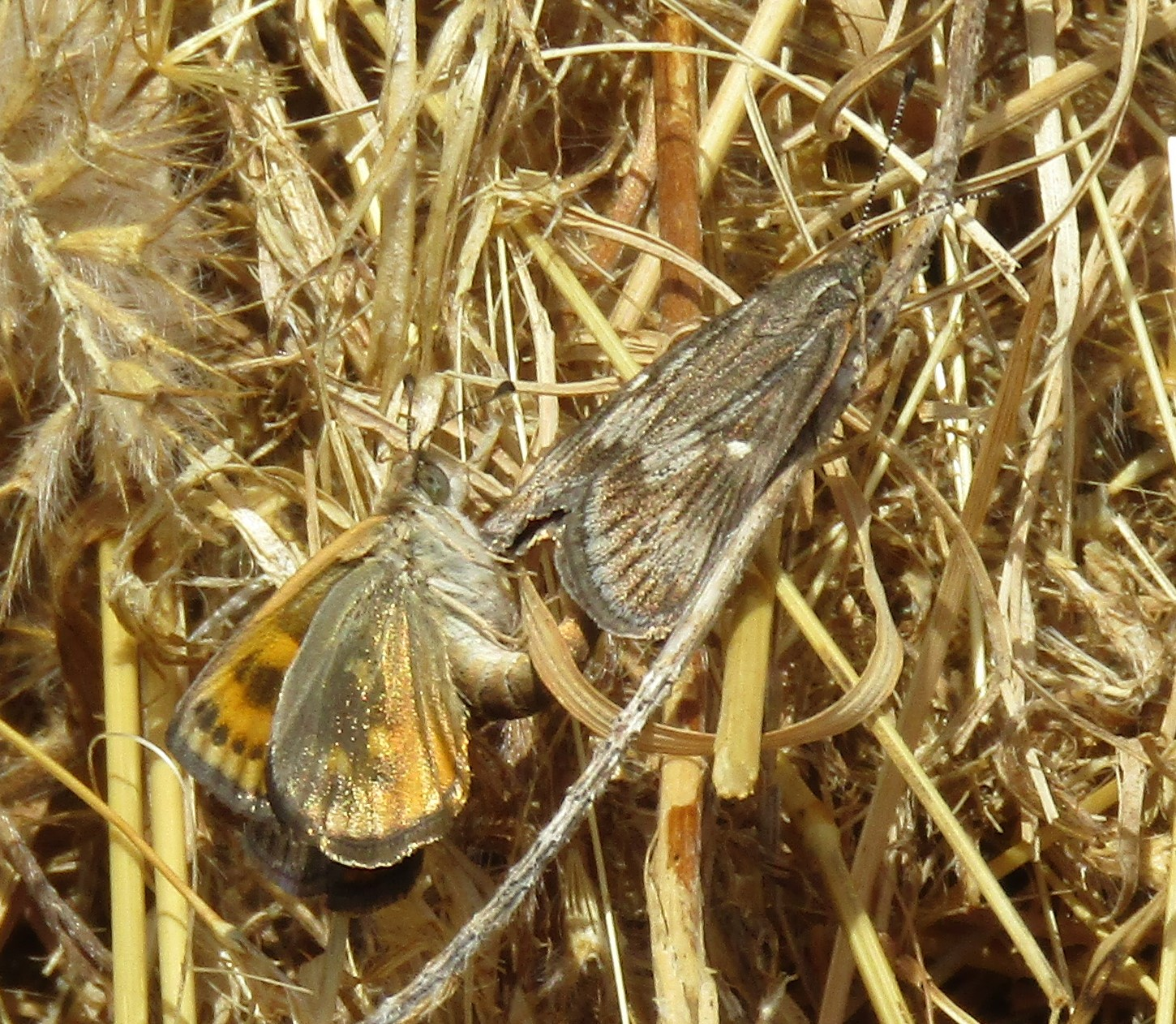
Cryptic sun-moths mating

Cryptic Sun-moth adults can be found from November to February. They only fly during the daytime in sunny, warm to hot weather, as is typical for the genus. Males tend to be more sedentary, while females are more active, periodically flying around the habitat looking for males.

Mating is initiated by a spiraling courtship flight. The female lays her eggs on the stems of the host grass near ground level, by either walking up to the plant on the ground, or by working her way down within the plant from the top. The eggs are pale brownish-yellow when laid, but become white as larval eclosion nears. The eggs measure about 1.75mm by 0.65mm and have four longitudinal ridges. The first instar larva emerges after about 19–20 days. At this point it is around 2.3mm long, and a pale yellow colour. The larvae likely live within the root zone as other Synemon larvae do. The mature larvae and pupae have not been described for this species. The adult Cryptic Sun-moth does not have a feeding proboscis. It only lives for a few days, surviving off its fat stores built up during the larval stages.

== Decline and threats ==
The most likely cause of the cryptic sun-moth becoming extinct in Victoria is the widespread loss of habitat due to clearing for agriculture. The extant populations near Adelaide are also threatened by urban development, farming practices, government fire regimes, and the proliferation of olive bushes, exotic grasses and other weeds. Despite these threats, localised extinctions and the very limited (probably less than 100 square km) range that it is surviving in, the cryptic sun-moth is not protected by any conservation status in the state of South Australia. Nor is it listed as a threatened species at a national level.
