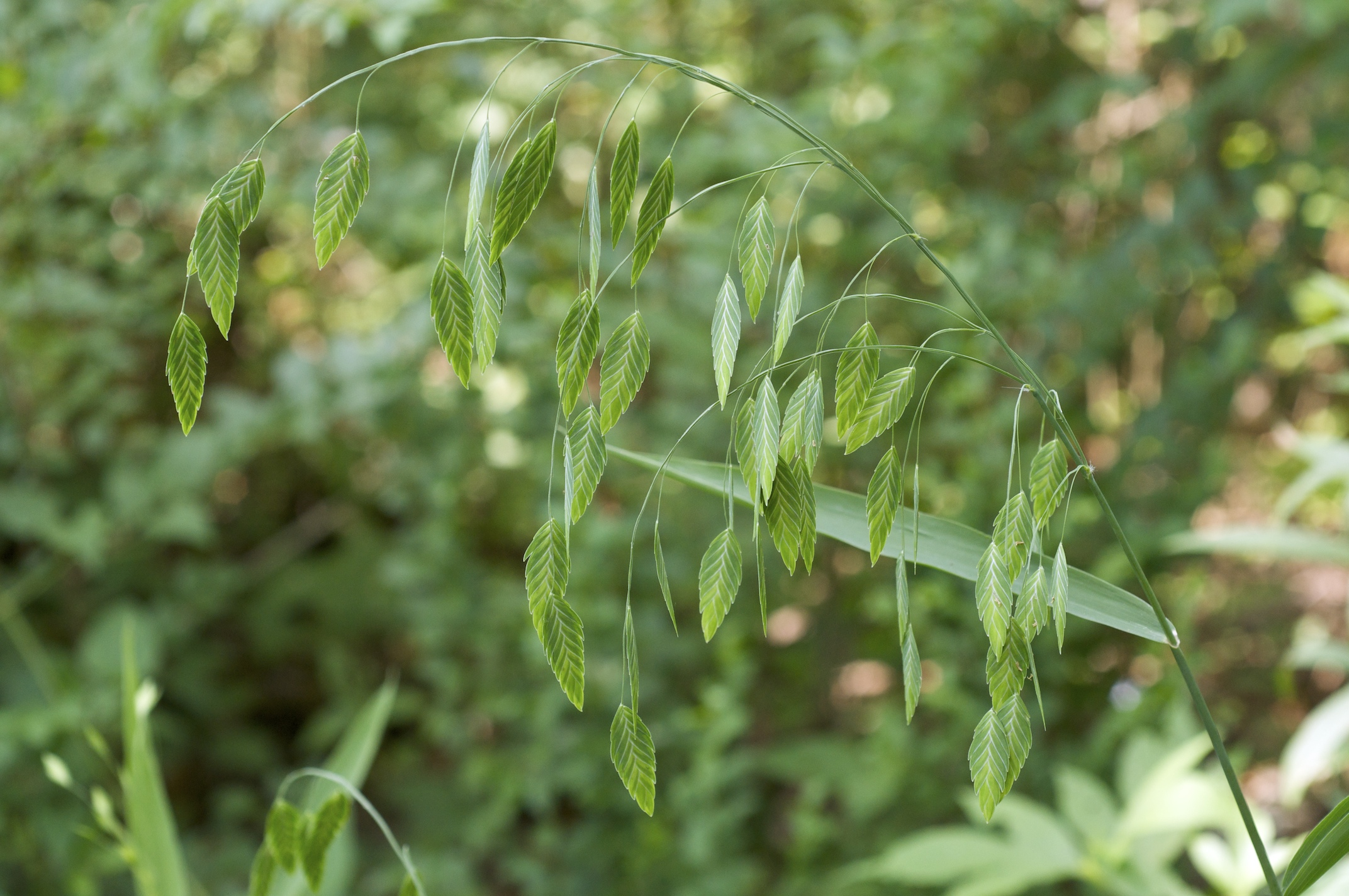
- Woodoats (Chasmanthium latifolium)

Scientific classification
- Kingdom: Plantae
- Clade: Tracheophytes
- Clade: Angiosperms
- Clade: Monocots
- Clade: Commelinids
- Order: Poales
- Family: Poaceae
- Clade: PACMAD clade
- Subfamily: Panicoideae
- Tribe: Chasmanthieae; W.V. Br. & B.N. Smith ex Sánchez-Ken & L.G. Clark

Genera
- Bromuniola; Chasmanthium

= Chasmanthieae =

Tribe of grasses

Chasmanthieae is a small tribe of grasses in the subfamily Panicoideae. It belongs to a basal lineage within the subfamily and has only seven species in two genera, Bromuniola with one species in Africa and Chasmanthium from North America. They all use the C_{3} photosynthetic pathway.
