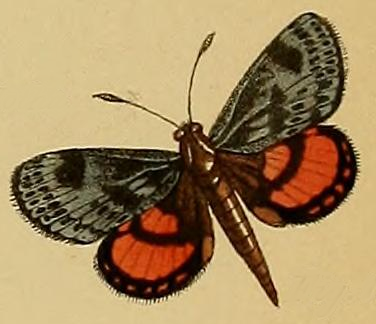
- Mounted specimen illustrated in the original description

Scientific classification
- Kingdom: Animalia
- Phylum: Arthropoda
- Class: Insecta
- Order: Lepidoptera
- Family: Castniidae
- Genus: Synemon
- Species: S. notha

Binomial name
- Synemon notha Westwood, 1877

= Synemon notha =

Species of moth

Synemon notha is a moth in the Castniidae family. It is found in Australia, including Western Australia.

The head, body and forewings are dark brown. The latter irrorated and smeared in parts with greyish white scales, leaving some dark more or less indistinct transverse bands, although more distinct in the females than in the males. There is also a central broad band, a short band from the costa, a patch on the costa close to the apex and two incomplete bands of short streaks. The hindwings are bright orange suffused with crimson. The bands are black. The underside of both wings is reddish orange and the bands are black.
