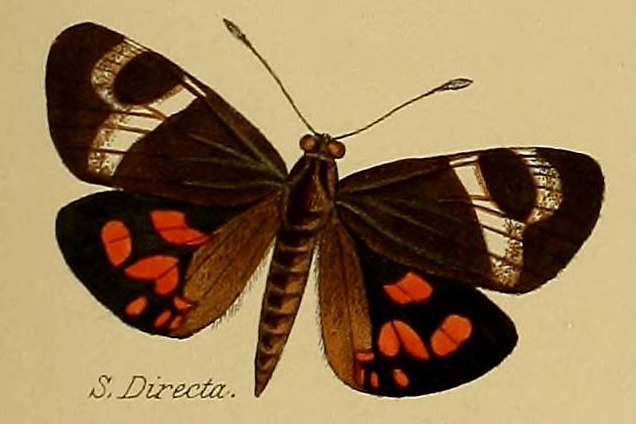
- Mounted specimen illustrated in the original description

Scientific classification
- Kingdom: Animalia
- Phylum: Arthropoda
- Class: Insecta
- Order: Lepidoptera
- Family: Castniidae
- Genus: Synemon
- Species: S. directa

Binomial name
- Synemon directa Westwood, 1877

Synonyms
- Synemon monodesma Lower, 1905; Synemon bifasciata Strand, 1911

= Synemon directa =

Species of moth

Synemon directa, the white-banded sun moth, is a moth in the Castniidae family. It is found in Australia, including Western Australia.

The larvae feed on Lepidosperma gladiatum.
