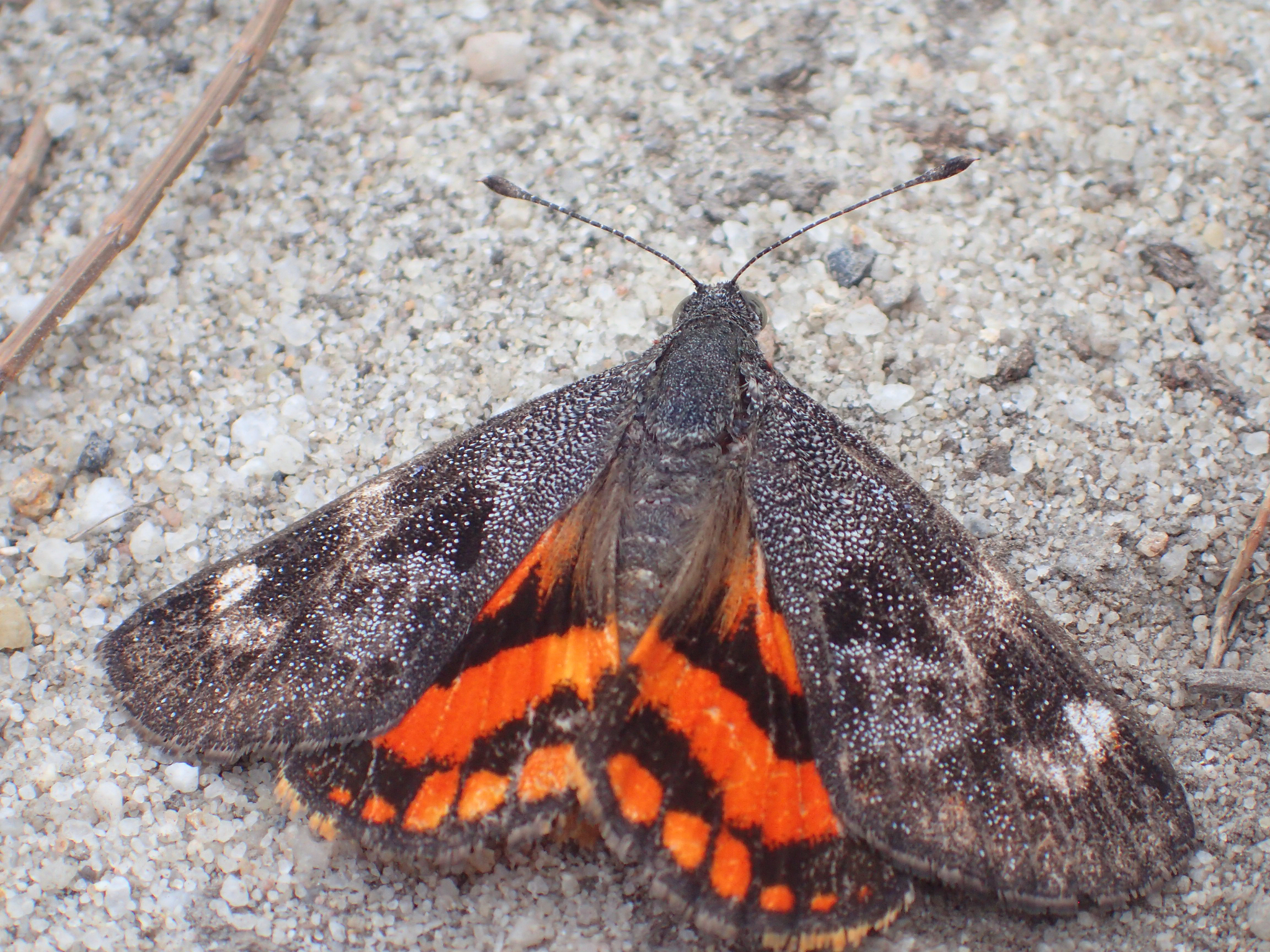

Scientific classification
- Domain: Eukaryota
- Kingdom: Animalia
- Phylum: Arthropoda
- Class: Insecta
- Order: Lepidoptera
- Family: Castniidae
- Genus: Synemon
- Species: S. magnifica

Binomial name
- Synemon magnifica Strand, 1911

= Synemon magnifica =

Species of moth

Synemon magnifica, the magnificent sun-moth, is a species of moth in the family Castniidae. It is found in Australia, including New South Wales.

The larvae feed on Lepidosperma viscidum.
