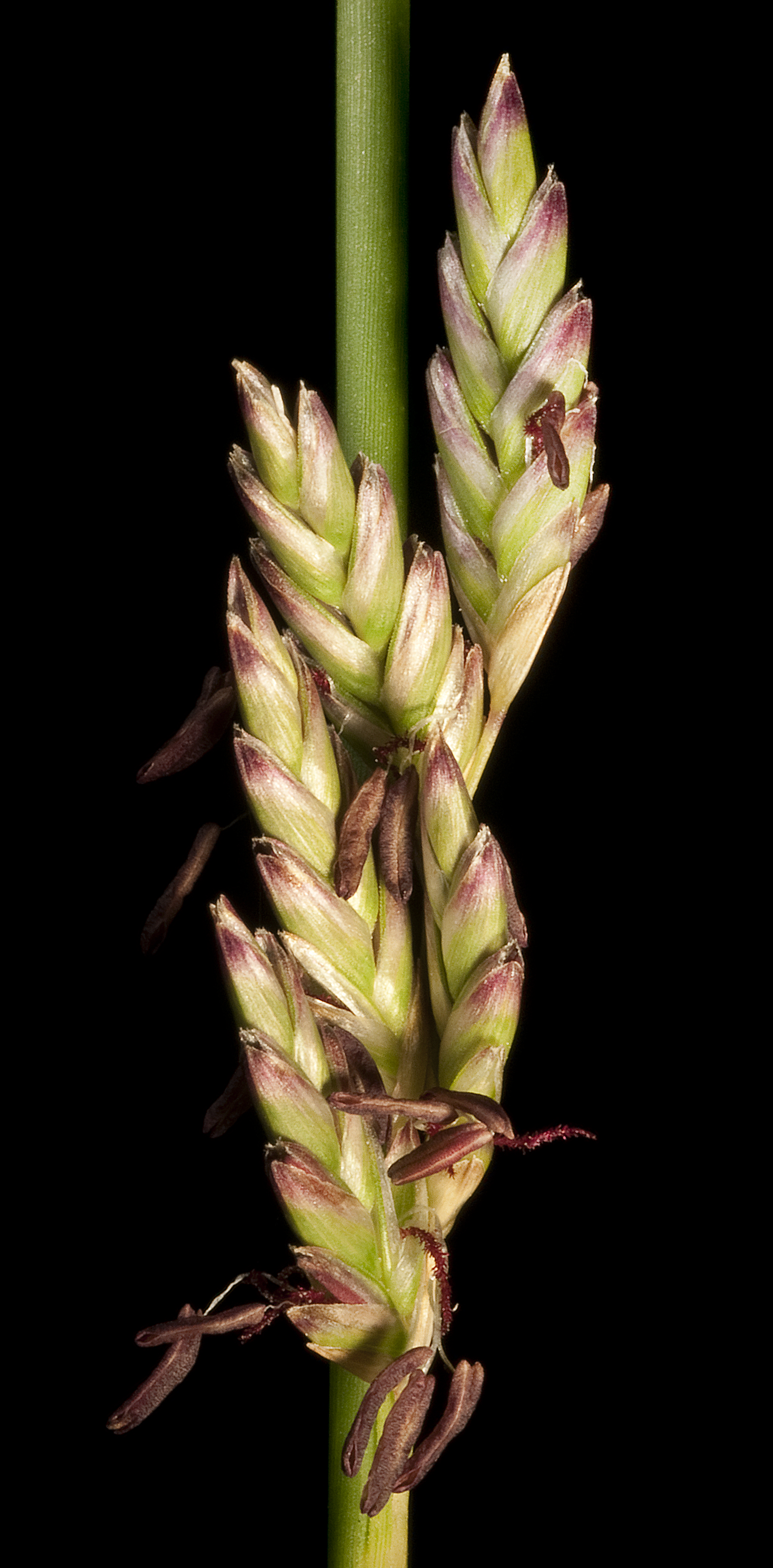

Scientific classification
- Kingdom: Plantae
- Clade: Tracheophytes
- Clade: Angiosperms
- Clade: Monocots
- Clade: Commelinids
- Order: Poales
- Family: Poaceae
- Subfamily: Panicoideae
- Tribe: Cyperochloeae
- Genus: Spartochloa; C.E.Hubb.
- Species: S. scirpoidea

Binomial name
- Spartochloa scirpoidea (Steud.) C.E.Hubb.

Synonyms
- Brizopyrum scirpoideum Steud.; Festuca scirpoidea (Steud.) F.Muell.; Schedonorus scirpoideus (Steud.) Benth.

= Spartochloa =

Genus of grasses

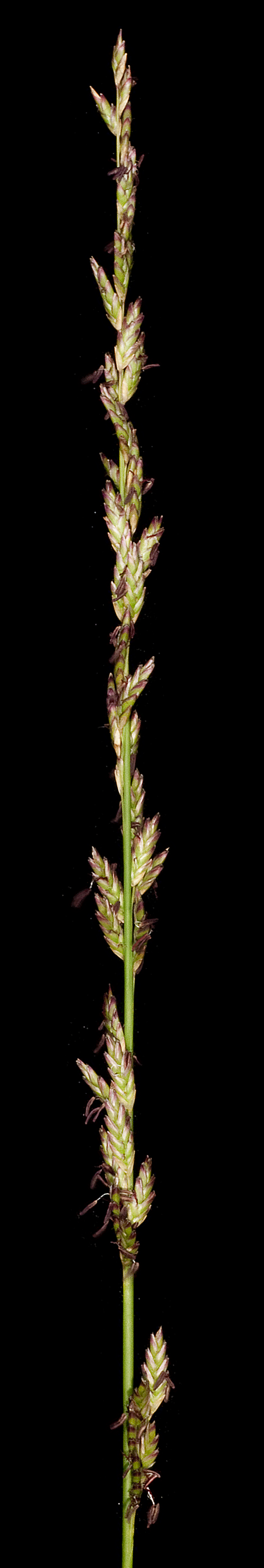

Spartochloa is a genus of Australian plants in the grass family. The only known species is Spartochloa scirpoidea, found only in the southern part of Western Australia.

The species was first described by Ernst Gottlieb von Steudel in 1854 as Bryzopyrum scirpoideum.
