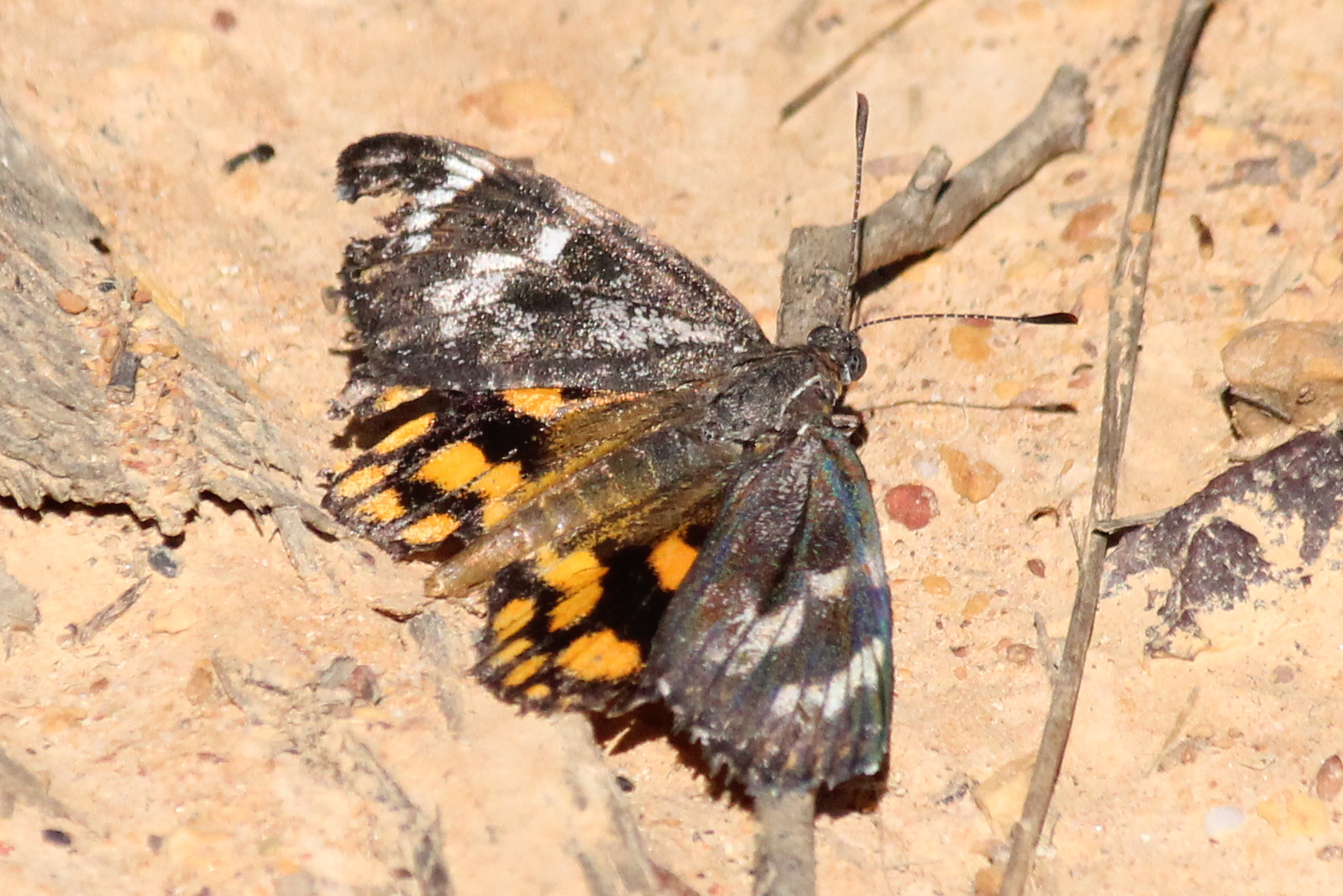

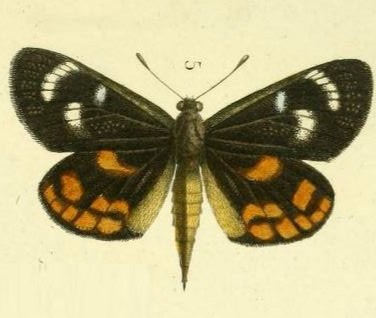

Scientific classification
- Domain: Eukaryota
- Kingdom: Animalia
- Phylum: Arthropoda
- Class: Insecta
- Order: Lepidoptera
- Family: Castniidae
- Genus: Synemon
- Species: S. parthenoides

Binomial name
- Synemon parthenoides R. Felder, 1874

Synonyms
- Synemon partita Strand, 1911

= Synemon parthenoides =

Species of moth

Synemon parthenoides, the orange-spotted sunmoth or link moth, is a moth in the Castniidae family. It is found in Australia, including Victoria, Western Australia and South Australia.

The wingspan is about 35 mm for males and 44 mm for females.

The larvae feed on the tussocks of Lepidosperma carphoides. They are pale pink.
