= Synemon phaeoptila =

Scientific classification
- Domain: Eukaryota
- Kingdom: Animalia
- Phylum: Arthropoda
- Class: Insecta
- Order: Lepidoptera
- Family: Castniidae
- Genus: Synemon
- Species: S. phaeoptila

Binomial name
- Synemon phaeoptila Turner, 1906

Synonyms
- Synemon affinita Strand, 1911; Synemon josepha Strand, 1911

Species of moth

Synemon phaeoptila is a moth in the Castniidae family. It is found in Australia, including the Northern Territory and Queensland.
