= Piedmont Mountains =

Various low-lying mountain ranges in the eastern United States

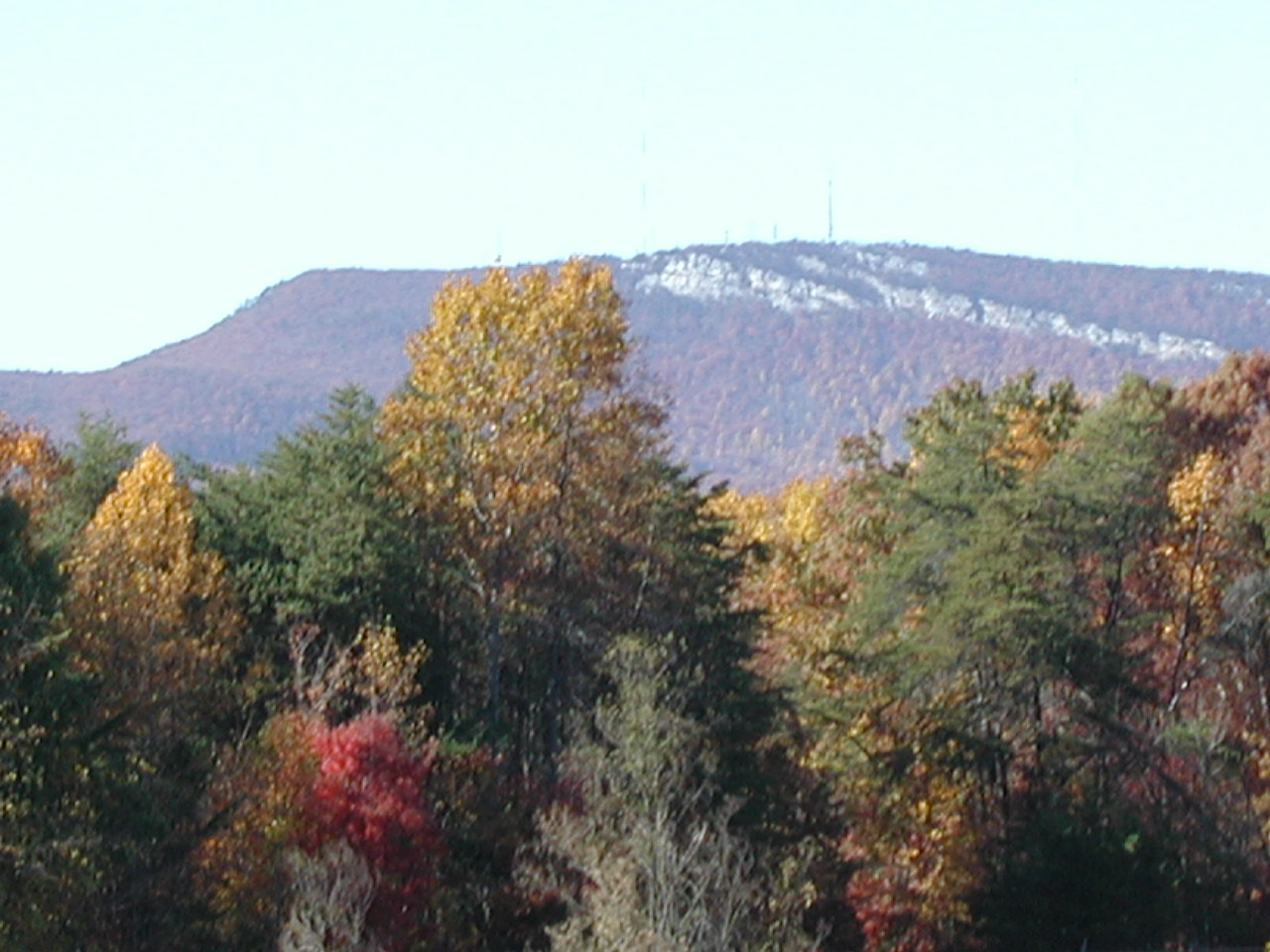
The Sauratown Mountains in North Carolina, one of the larger Piedmont mountain ranges

The Piedmont Mountains are a series of outlying mountain ranges, sometimes called “low mountains”, in the Eastern United States, mostly in the western Piedmont near the Blue Ridge Mountains. The Piedmont is part of the greater Appalachian Mountain Range. The French definition of piedmont is "foothill"; however, a Piedmont Mountain is often of greater significance or prominent elevation.

Most of the features within the Piedmont physiographic province of North America lie either on the eastern border where the plateau plunges onto the Atlantic Coastal Plain at the Fall Line, in the broad valleys of the river systems, or on the western border where Piedmont Mountains occur. Occasionally, due to diverse rock formations, folds, and outcroppings, these mountains can rise at various locations across the Piedmont like the Uwharrie Mountains in North Carolina or the Pine Mountain Range in Georgia. Most of these mountains or hills are the eroded remnants of ancient mountain ranges. Some, like Stone Mountain in Georgia, are solitary rock domes called monadnocks which become further exposed with erosion.

== Flora and fauna ==
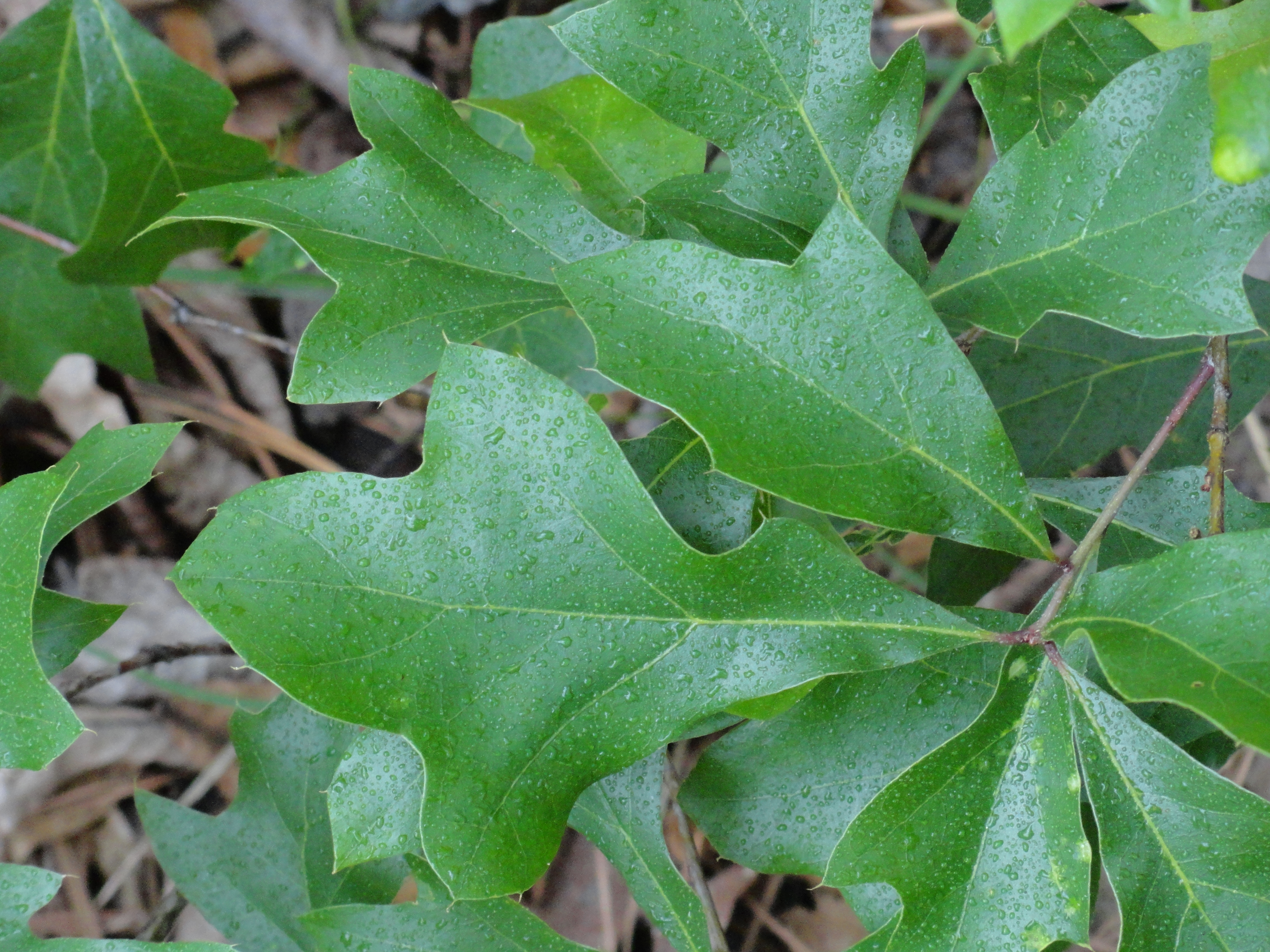
The Georgia Oak, an uncommon species found predominately on Stone Mountain in Georgia

The native plants and animals on these mountains vary in diversity. Many of the plants that can be found in the Appalachian Mountains to the west may be found isolated upon these hills. Consequently, much of the vegetation common to the Piedmont may be sited here as well and lead to hybridization or species exclusively found at particular sites. This fact alone sometimes lead to an areas protection as well as the notoriety of the location itself being an oddity.

== Location ==
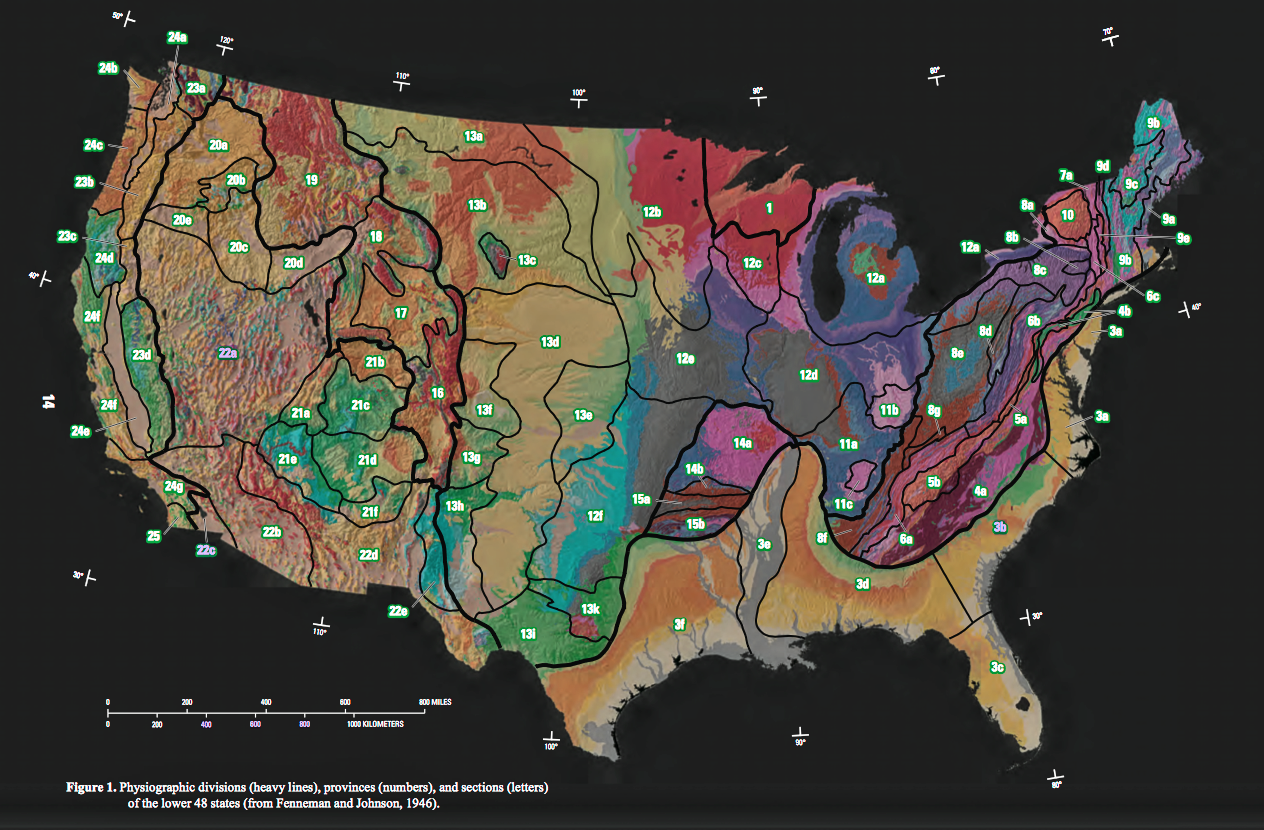
The regions of the United States

The Piedmont extends north from mid-eastern Alabama to extreme southern New York. Almost ninety percent of the Piedmont lies south below the Mason–Dixon line before permeating into the New England region. Therefore, the Piedmont Mountains in the Southeast occur less frequently (in a larger area) and are more prominent. Once the Piedmont enters Pennsylvania it comes into contact with a total of four physiographic provinces as the Piedmont itself begins to terminate. Here, the regional territories are less defined and the hills seem to scatter. It is also in this vicinity that the Appalachian Trail leaves the Blue Ridge, climbs onto the Ridge and Valley (very near Piedmont Mountains) and enters the New England region.

=== Alabama ===
- Cheaha Mountain

=== Georgia ===
- Kennesaw Mountain
- Sweat Mountain
- Sawnee Mountain Range
- Stone Mountain
- Alcovy Mountain
- Panola Mountain
- Pine Mountain Range

=== South Carolina ===
- Glassy Mountain
- Paris Mountain

=== North Carolina ===
- Crowders Mountain
- Uwharrie Mountains
- Sauratown Mountains
