= Synemon maja =

Scientific classification
- Domain: Eukaryota
- Kingdom: Animalia
- Phylum: Arthropoda
- Class: Insecta
- Order: Lepidoptera
- Family: Castniidae
- Genus: Synemon
- Species: S. maja

Binomial name
- Synemon maja Strand, 1911

Synonyms
- Synemon gerda Strand, 1911

Species of moth

Synemon maja is a moth in the Castniidae family. It is found in Australia, including Western Australia.
