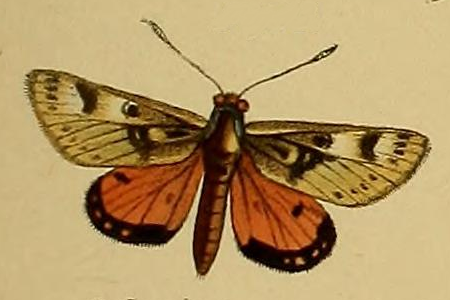
- Mounted specimen illustrated in the original description

Scientific classification
- Kingdom: Animalia
- Phylum: Arthropoda
- Class: Insecta
- Order: Lepidoptera
- Family: Castniidae
- Genus: Synemon
- Species: S. gratiosa

Binomial name
- Synemon gratiosa Westwood, 1877

= Synemon gratiosa =

Species of moth

Synemon gratiosa, the graceful sun-moth, is a moth in the Castniidae family. It is found in Western Australia, from Namburg National Park in the north to Mandurah in the south.

The wingspan is 25–35 mm.

Adults are on wing in autumn. There is one generation per year.

The larvae feed on Lomandra maritima and Lomandra hermaphrodita.
