= Synemon collecta =

Scientific classification
- Domain: Eukaryota
- Kingdom: Animalia
- Phylum: Arthropoda
- Class: Insecta
- Order: Lepidoptera
- Family: Castniidae
- Genus: Synemon
- Species: S. collecta

Binomial name
- Synemon collecta C. Swinhoe, 1892

Synonyms
- Synemon obscuripennis Strand, 1911; Synemon simpla Strand, 1911

Species of moth

Synemon collecta, the striated sun moth, is a moth in the family Castniidae. The species was first described by Charles Swinhoe in 1892. It is found in Australia, including Victoria, New South Wales and Queensland. The population in Victoria might represent an undescribed allied species.

The wingspan is about 39 mm for males and 41 mm for females.

Adults are on wing from late December to mid-January.

The larvae feed on the roots of various grass species, including Austrodanthonia laevis and other Austrodanthonia species. They spend most of their life underground.
