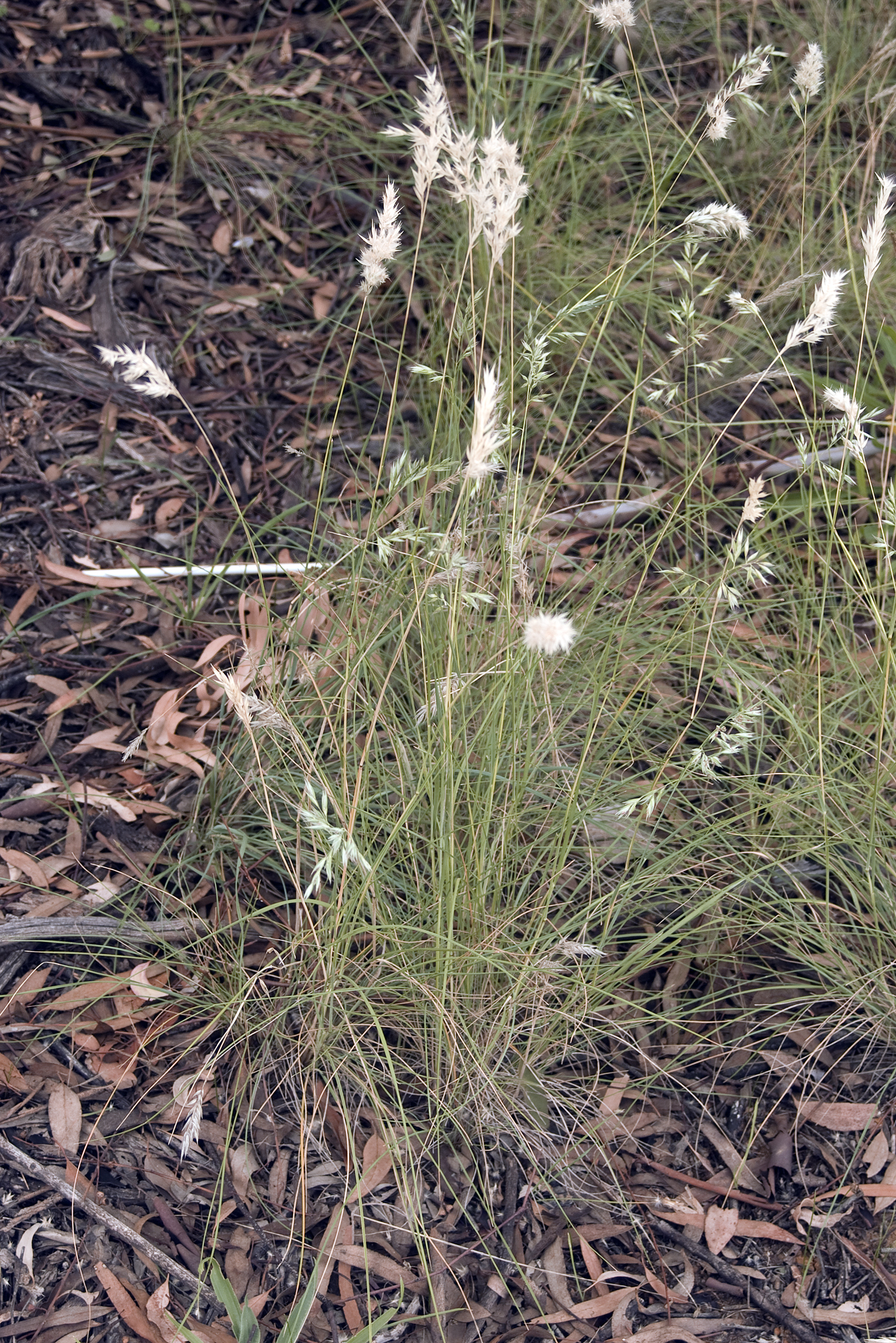

Scientific classification
- Kingdom: Plantae
- Clade: Tracheophytes
- Clade: Angiosperms
- Clade: Monocots
- Clade: Commelinids
- Order: Poales
- Family: Poaceae
- Genus: Rytidosperma
- Species: R. setaceum

Binomial name
- Rytidosperma setaceum (R.Br.) Connor & Edgar

Synonyms
- Austrodanthonia setacea (R.Br.) H.P.Linder; Danthonia penicillata var. setacea (R.Br.) Rodway; Danthonia setacea R.Br.; Danthonia subulata Hook.f.; Notodanthonia setacea (R.Br.) Veldkamp

= Rytidosperma setaceum =

Species of plant

Rytidosperma setaceum, known by various common names including small-flowered wallaby-grass, mulga- or bristly wallaby-grass, is a species of grass native to Australia. Originally described by Robert Brown under the name Danthonia setacea, it was transferred into Austrodanthonia by Hans Peter Linder in 1993 and finally Rytidosperma in 2011.

From the earlier name, setacea means bristle or stiff hair. It is a species with short bristles and the smallest delicate in appearance of the wallaby grasses.

It grows as a perennial clump, with flowering stems from 15 to 60 cm high. It flowers from September to December.
