= Parc naturel régional de la Martinique =

Regional nature park in Martinique

- IUCN category V (protected landscape/seascape)
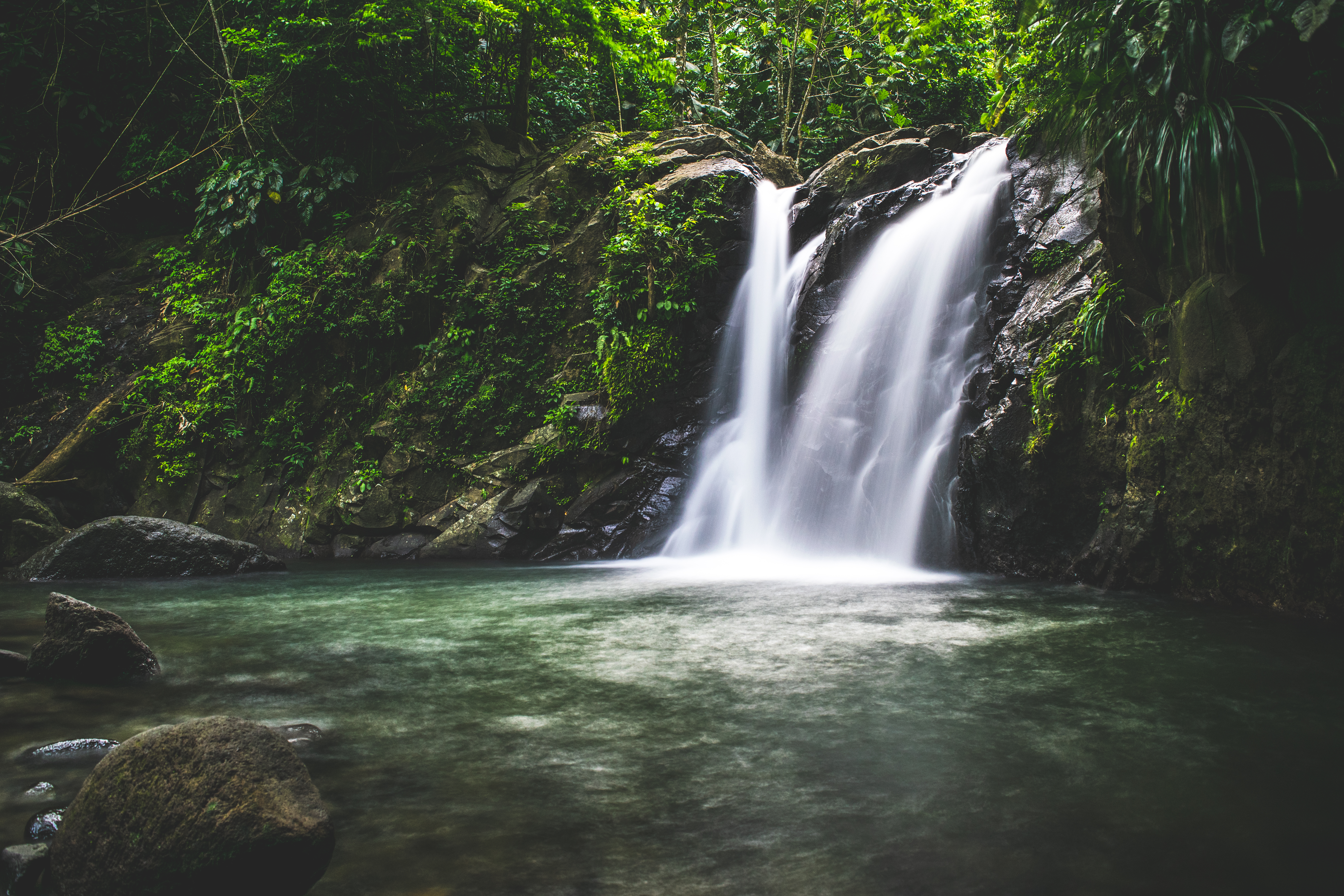
- Interactive map of Parc naturel régional de la Martinique
- Location: Martinique, France
- Coordinates: 14°36′40″N 61°05′03″W
- Area: 630 km^{2} (240 sq mi)
- Established: 1976
- Governing body: Le Parc naturel régional de la Martinique (PNRM)
- Website: http://pnr-martinique.com

UNESCO World Heritage Site
- Criteria: Natural: viii, x
- Reference: 1657
- Inscription: 2023 (45th Session)

Parc naturel régional de la Martinique (French pronunciation: [paʁk natyʁɛl ʁeʒjɔnal də la maʁtinik]) is one of 54 French regional nature parks. With a surface area of approximately 63,000 ha (240 sq mi), it covers more than half of the island, overlapping 32 of 34 communes – including approximately 100,000 inhabitants. The park works to preserve one of 34 biodiversity hotspots on the planet. The biodiversity hotspot map identifies areas for preservation by two criteria, one being a certain rate of endemism: that the flora and fauna are not found elsewhere, and because at least 70% of its primary vegetation has been lost.

== History ==
The area was classified as a Regional nature park in 1976. In the same year, the Caravelle peninsula was classified as a national nature reserve.

== Boundary and zoning ==
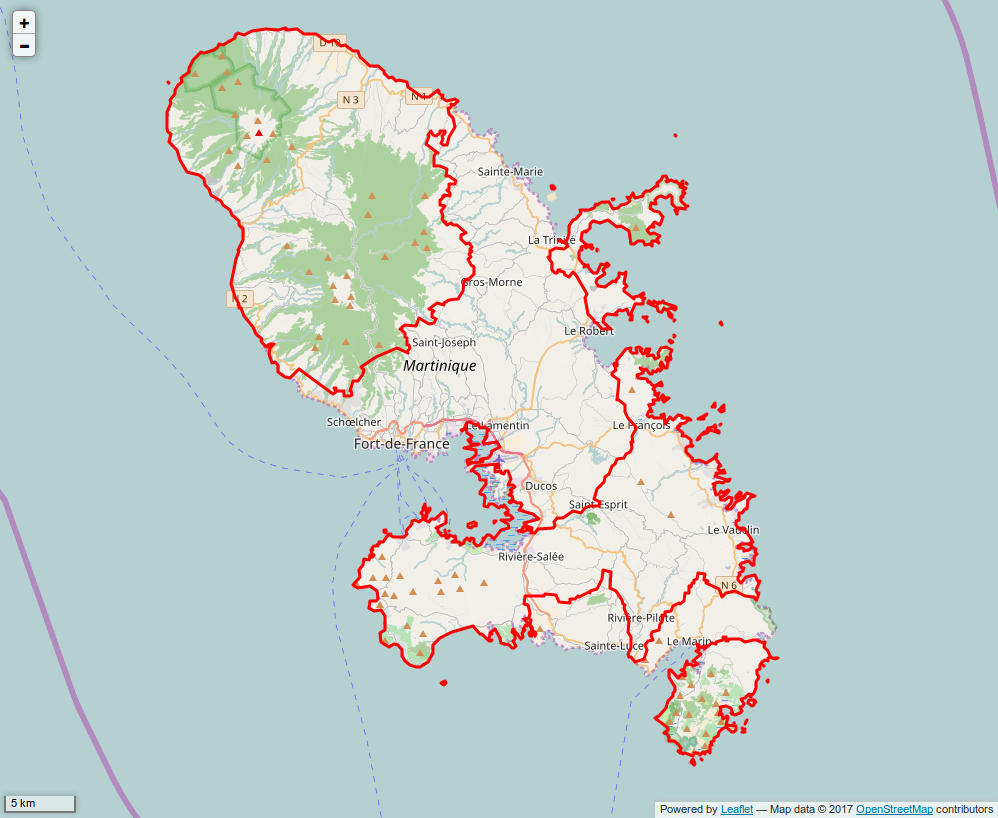
Park boundary

The regional nature park is divided into four geographically independent sub-areas.

=== List of communes ===
The park includes 32 of Martinique's 34 communes, 15 of which are only partly protected.

=== Protected areas ===
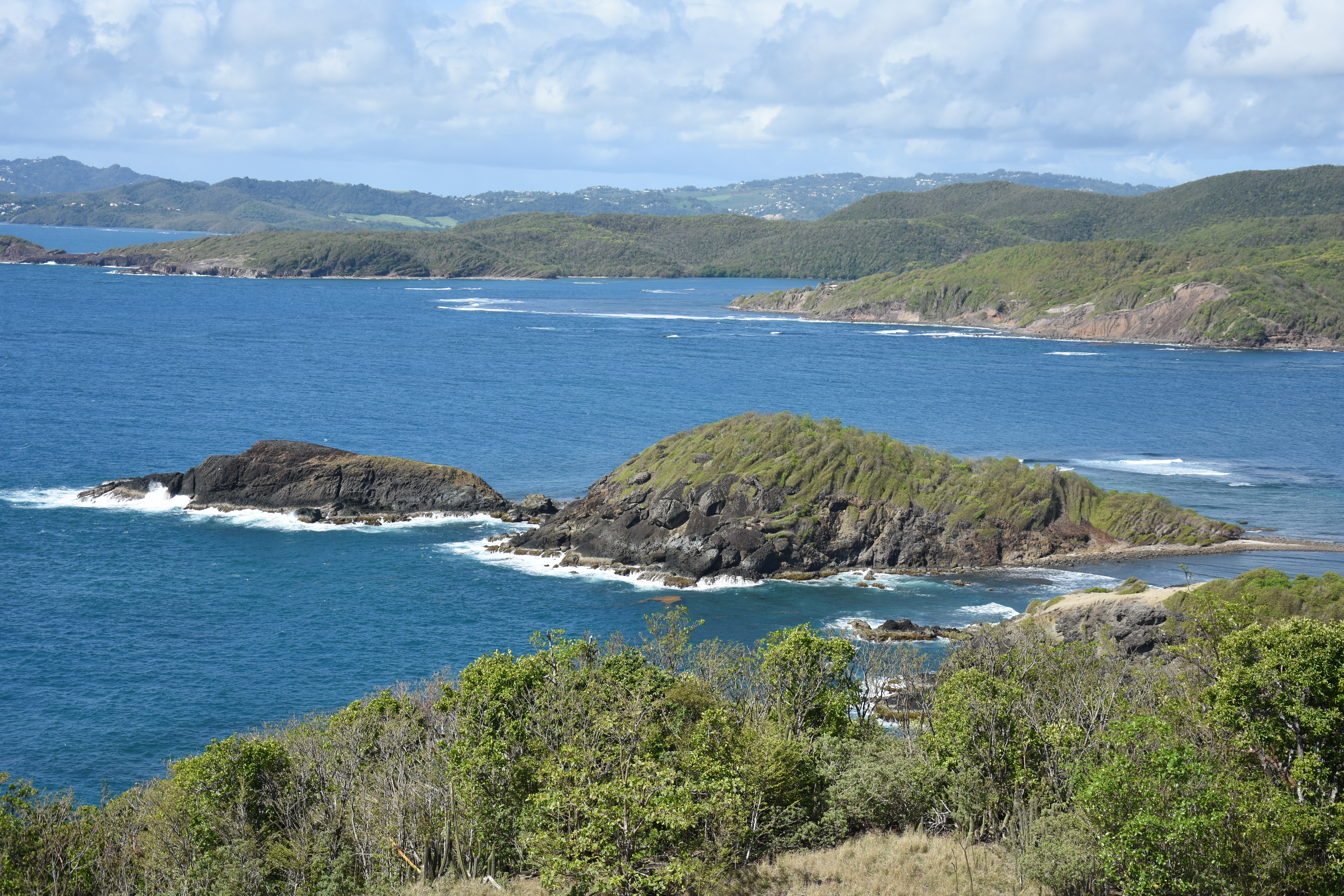
Pointe de la Caravelle, islands off La Trinité, Martinique

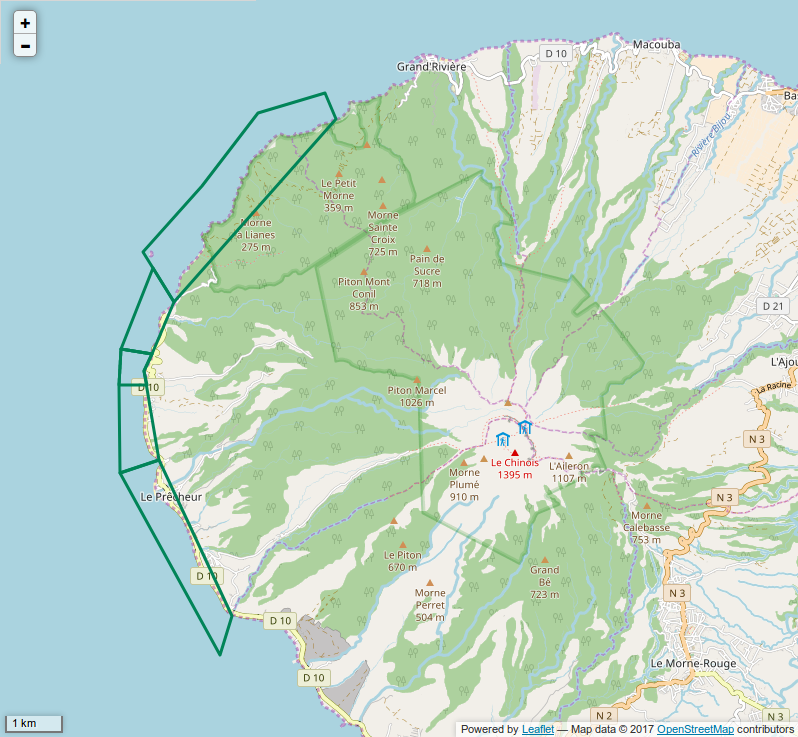
Réserve marine du prêcheur – Albert Falco

The Sainte-Anne Islets National Nature Reserve was created in 1995. It is managed jointly by the park and the National Forests Office. The Etang des Salines wetlands area is classified as a Ramsar site. The îlets de la Perle, the Citadelle and the coastal waters in north-west Martinique form a regional nature reserve called "Réserve marine du prêcheur – Albert Falco". On Mount Pelée's northern slopes, 2,301 ha (8.88 sq mi) of forest were classified as an integral biological reserve on 28 April 2007, and are managed by the National Forest Office.

=== Governing body ===
The park is administered by semi-public committees, bringing together elected representatives for the local authority and representatives of the communes.

=== Programmes and activities ===
==== UNESCO World Heritage Site ====
The Regional Nature Park, in partnership with the island's government, has registered the "volcanoes and forests of Mount Pelée and the Pitons of northern Martinique" as a UNESCO World Heritage Site candidate. It was officially designated a World Heritage Site in 2023.

==== The Zero Chlordecone label ====
The park has a number of banana plantations within its boundaries, and as a result was affected by the Chlordecone scandal. The regional nature park created a label to guarantee food products as free of contamination. An app was launched to allow consumers to check the provenance of products labelled "Zéro chlordécone" on 11 October 2019.

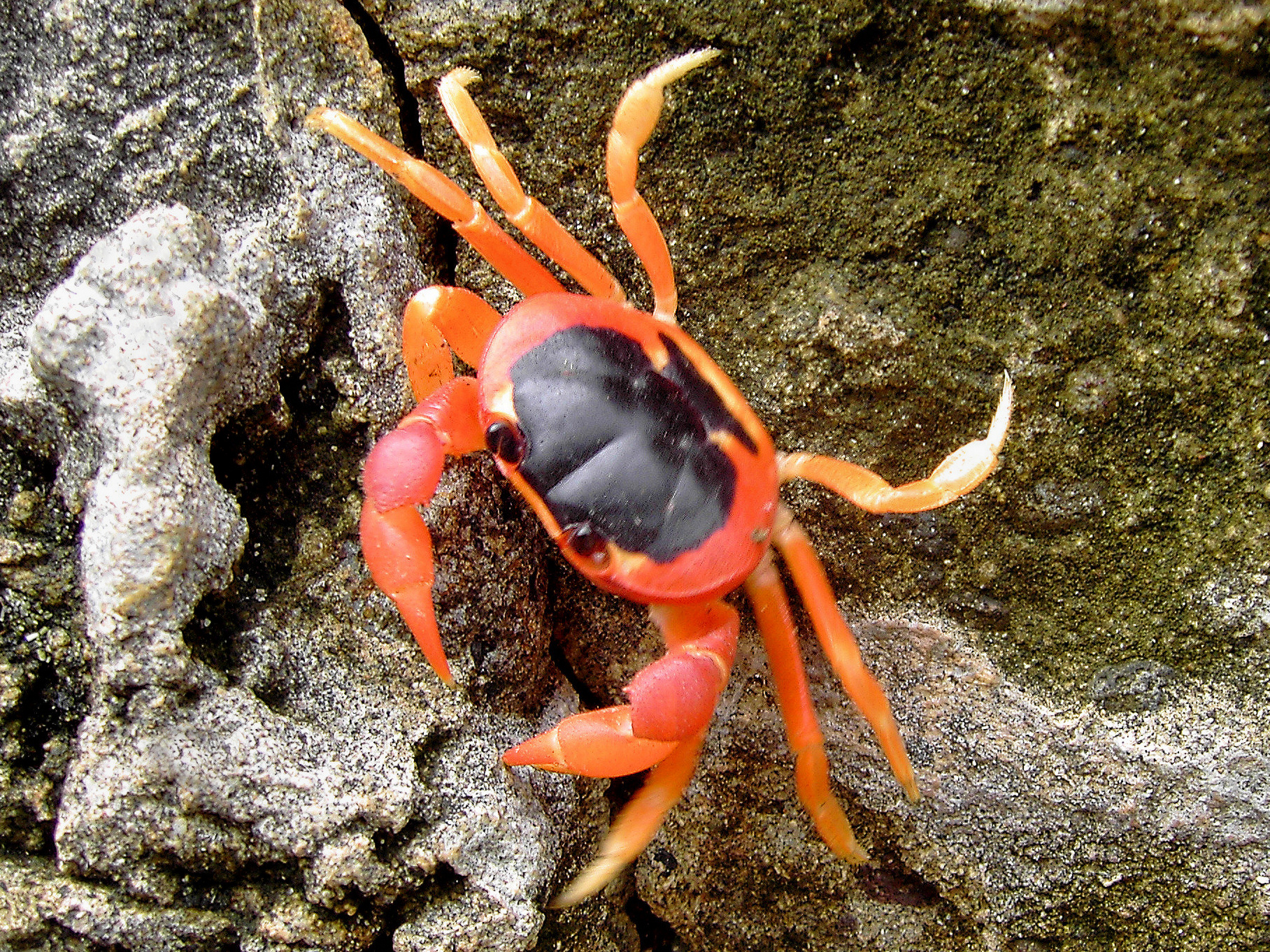
Touloulou (Gecarcinus lateralis)

==== The park brand ====
The park runs a quality control and promotion scheme for honey, lamb and cassava produced there, labelling those which meet its standard with the "marque parc".

==== Litter picking operation ====
A monthly litter clean up is carried out at places along the coast on Saturday mornings. These Touloulou operations (named after a crab found in the area) are organised by a group of 50 volunteers on average.

== Natural heritage and biodiversity ==
Martinique's isolation as an island in the tropics has encouraged diversification of species. It has a high rate of endemism, a combination of variety and uniqueness in its flora and fauna.

=== Diversity of fauna and flora ===
Seventeen species of terrestrial mammals have been recorded in Martinique, along with 21 species of reptiles and 6 species of amphibians which occupy a variety of environments of the island. Among arthropods, naturalists have identified 16 species of crustaceans, a hundred or so spiders and mygalomorphs, 1,139 species of hexapods including 30 species of odonates, 40 species of butterflies and more than 300 moths and at least 14 species of Hymenoptera apoidea according to a preliminary study, and at least 18 species of ladybirds.

Martinique has more than 60 breeding bird species. The islets of Sainte-Anne contain nesting places important to seabirds such as the red-billed tropicbird, the bridled tern, Sargasso shearwater, the brown noddy or the sooty tern.

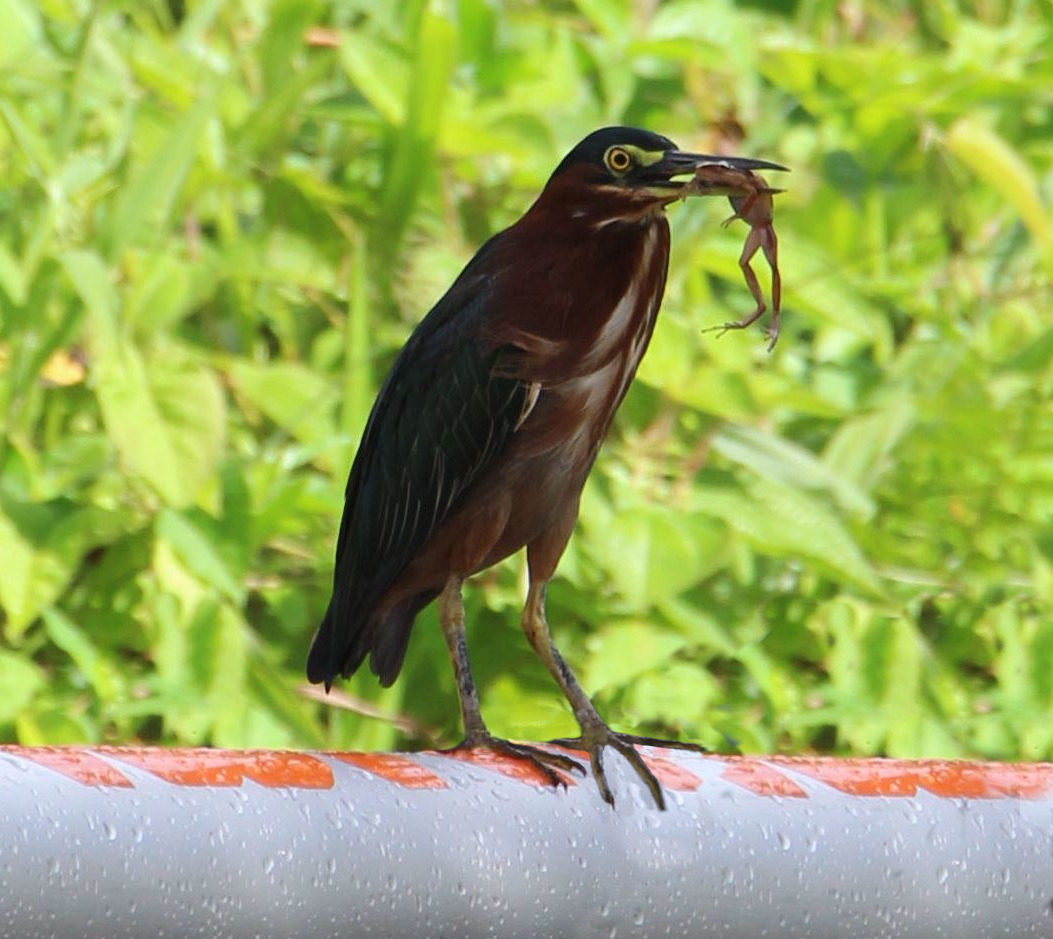
Kayali (Butorides virescens)

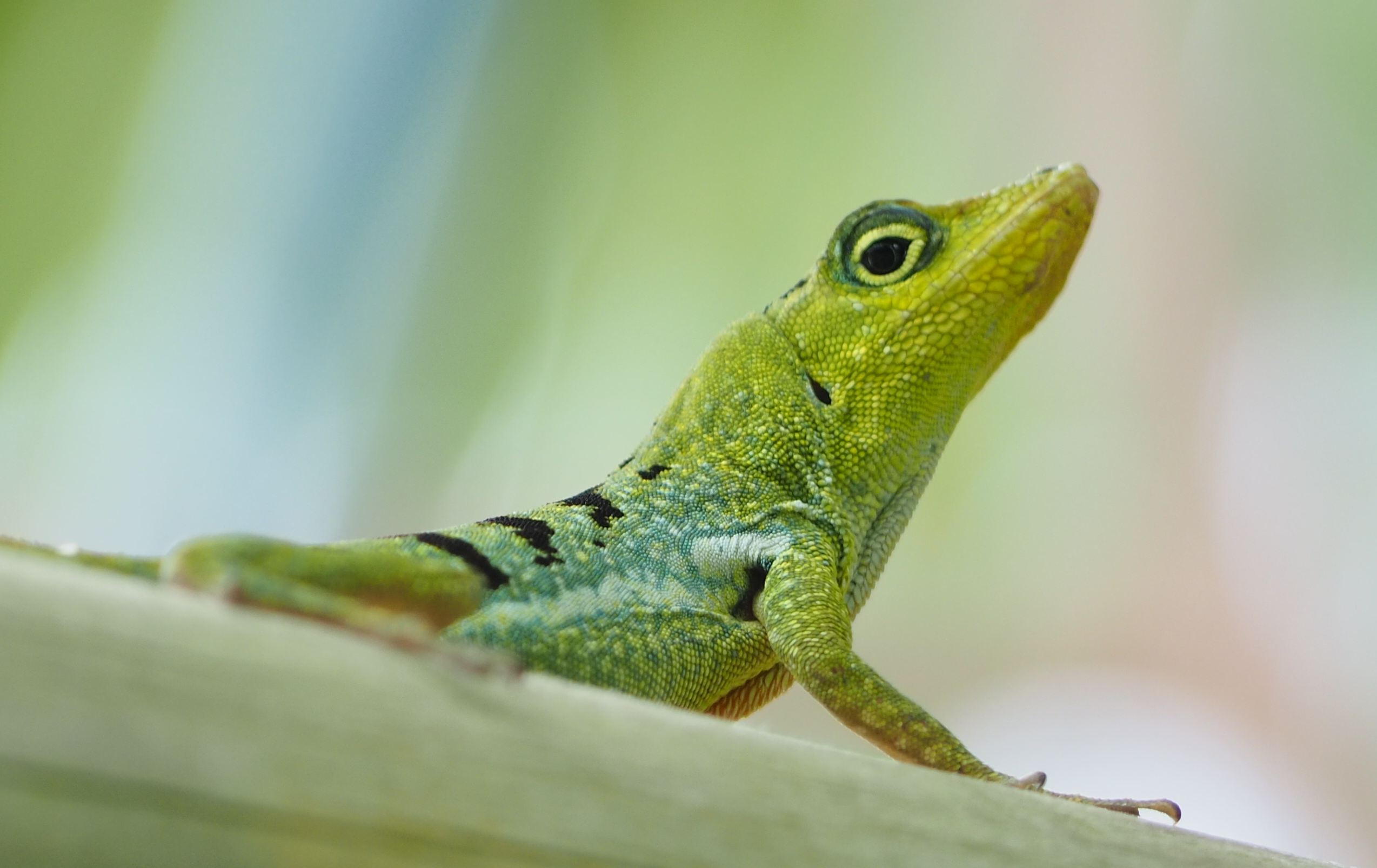
Anolis, a lizard

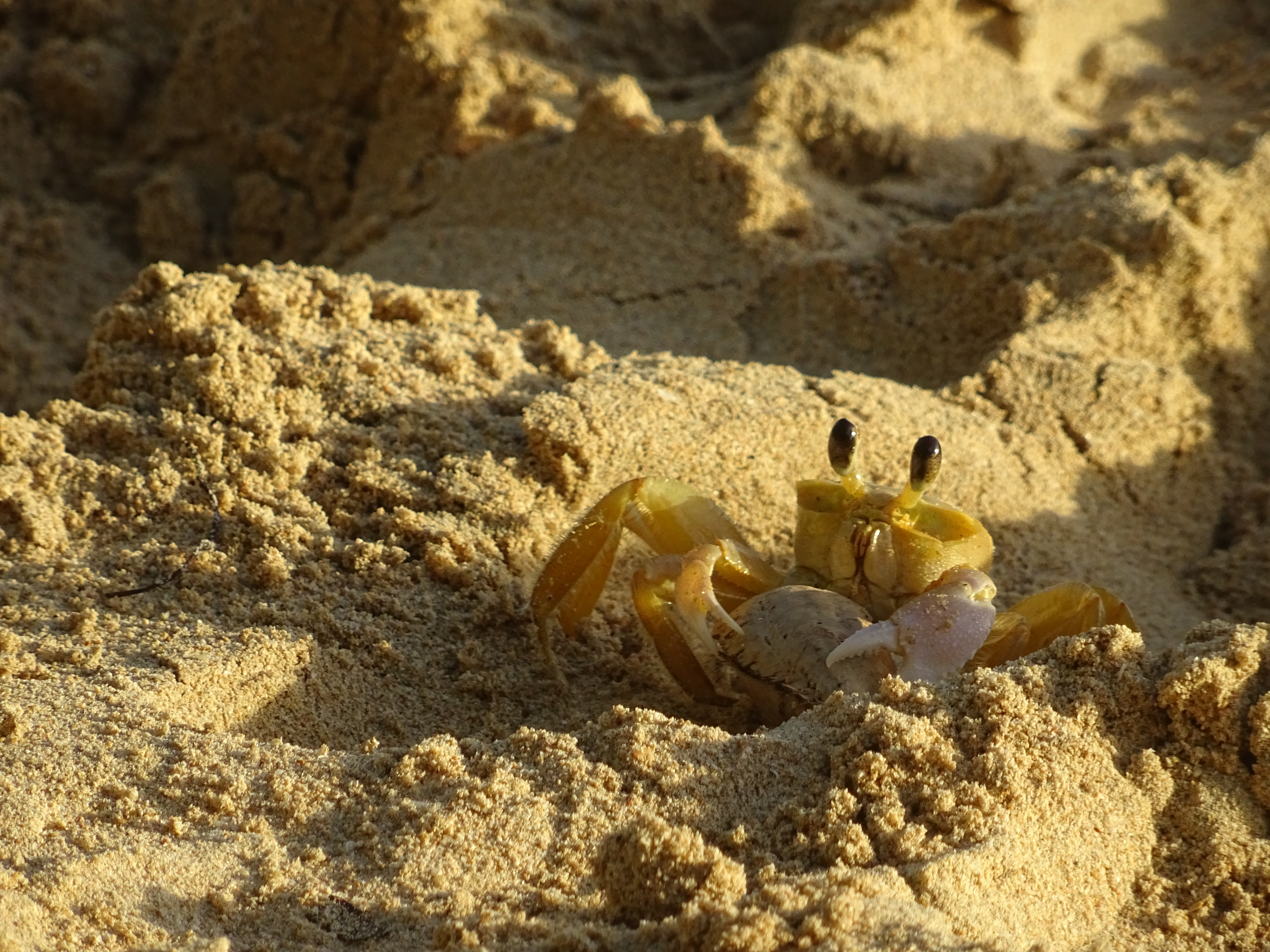
A small crab

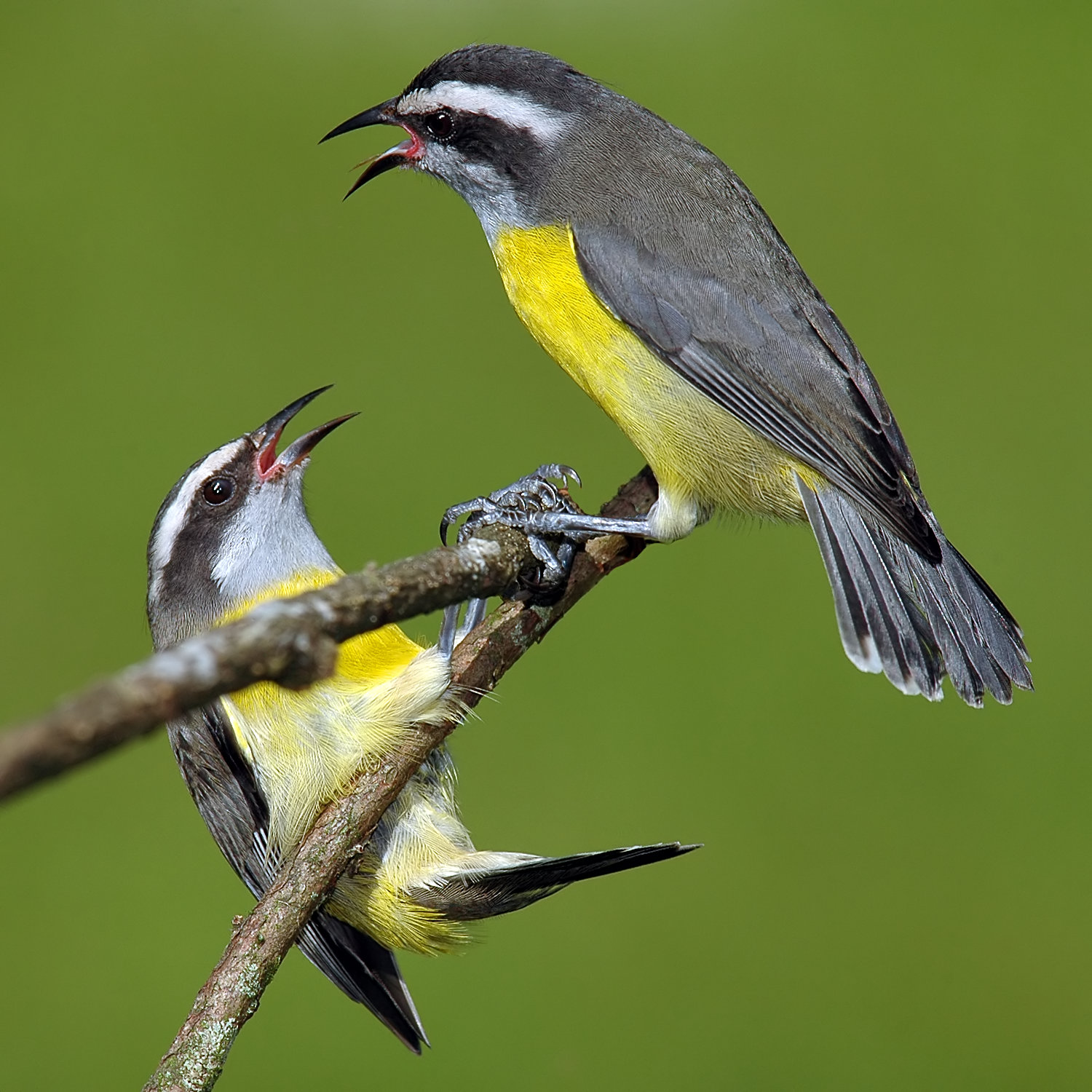
Bananaquits

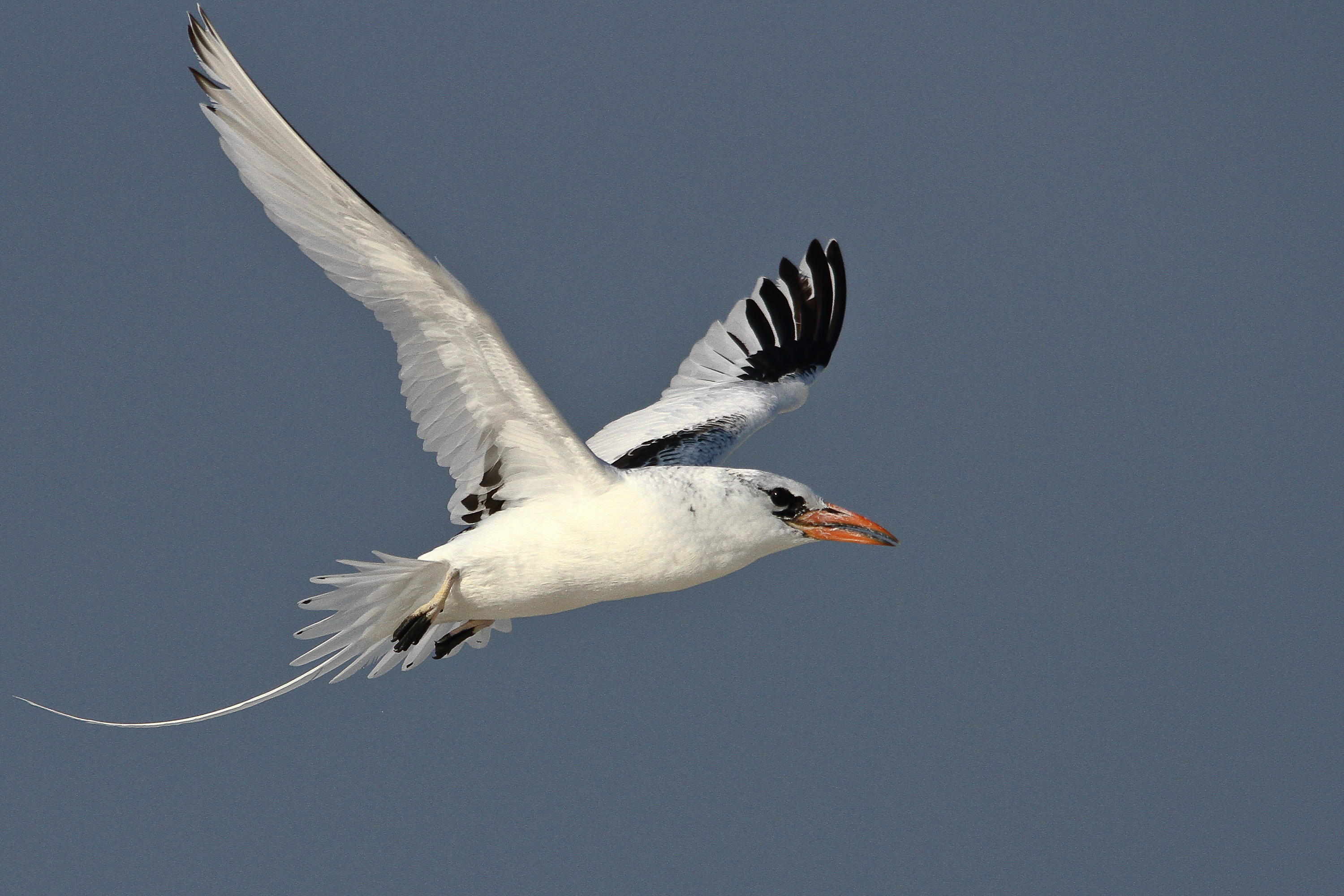
Red billed tropic bird

There are 396 species of tree in Martinique, of which 20% are endemic to the Lesser Antilles, the greatest diversity of trees among the islands. As of 2010, 56 were in danger of local extinction and 12 of total extinction. More generally, the island has 1238 native spermatophytes and 259 native pteridophytes. Of the total spermatophytes, 39 species are endemic to this island, 177 to the Lesser Antilles and 172 to the Caribbean.

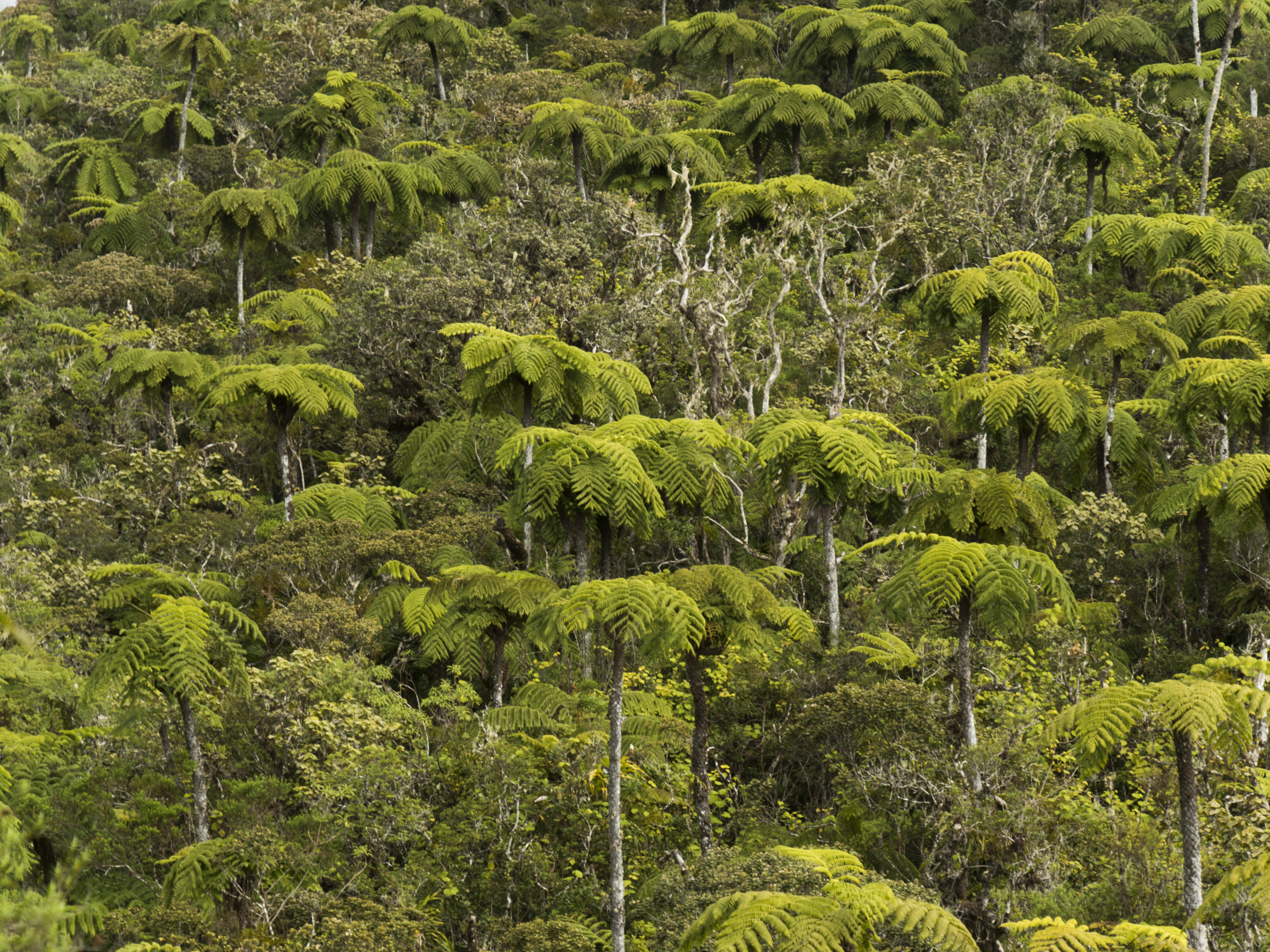
Forest of tree ferns

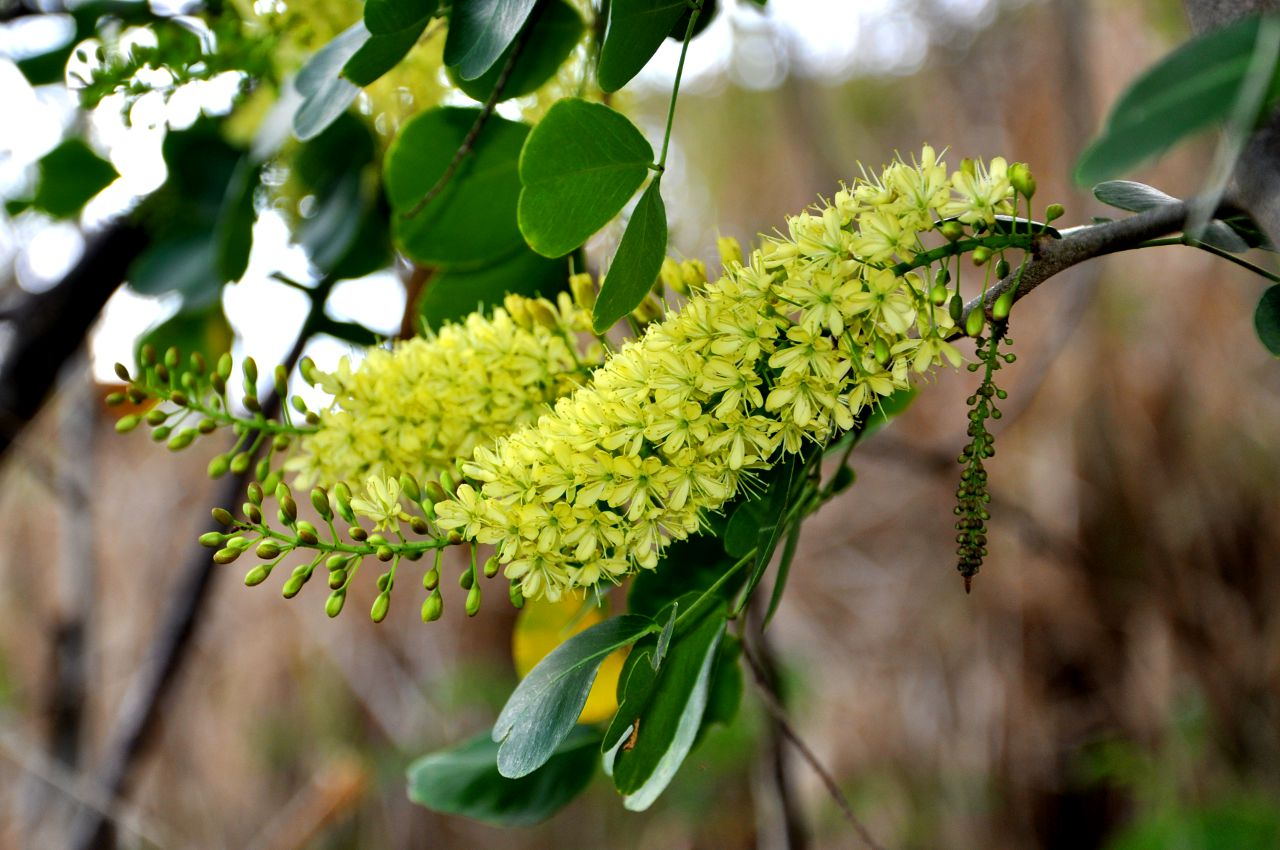
Campêche flower

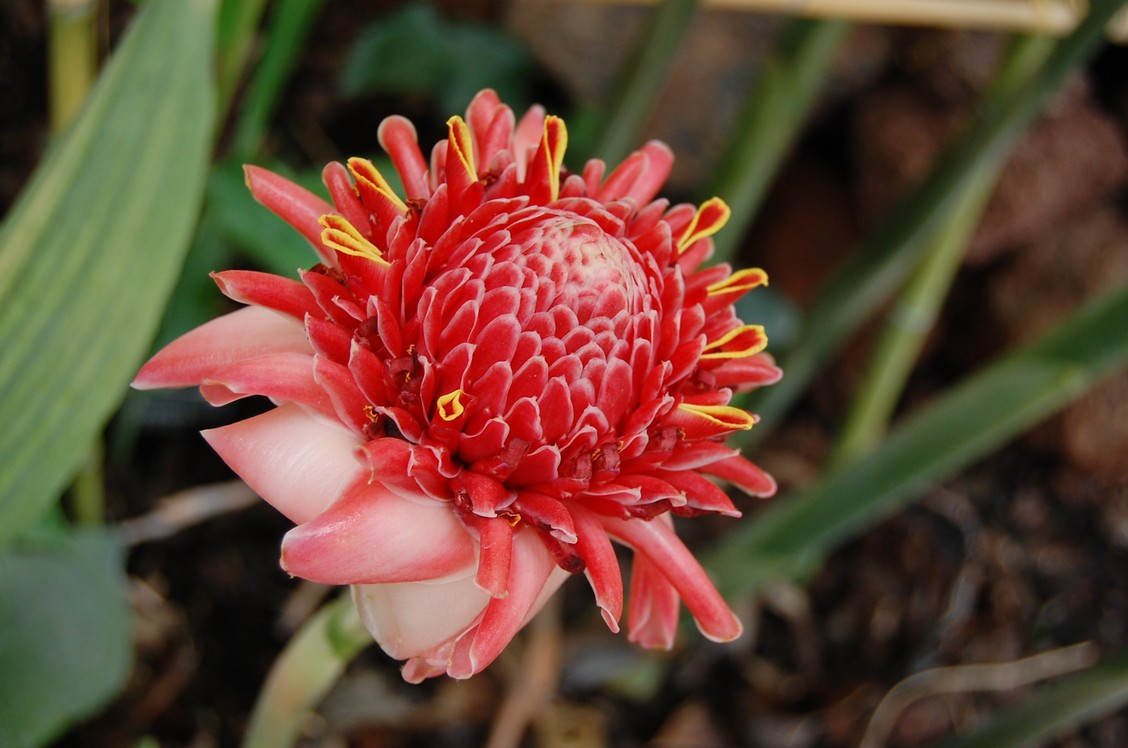
Rose de porcelaine

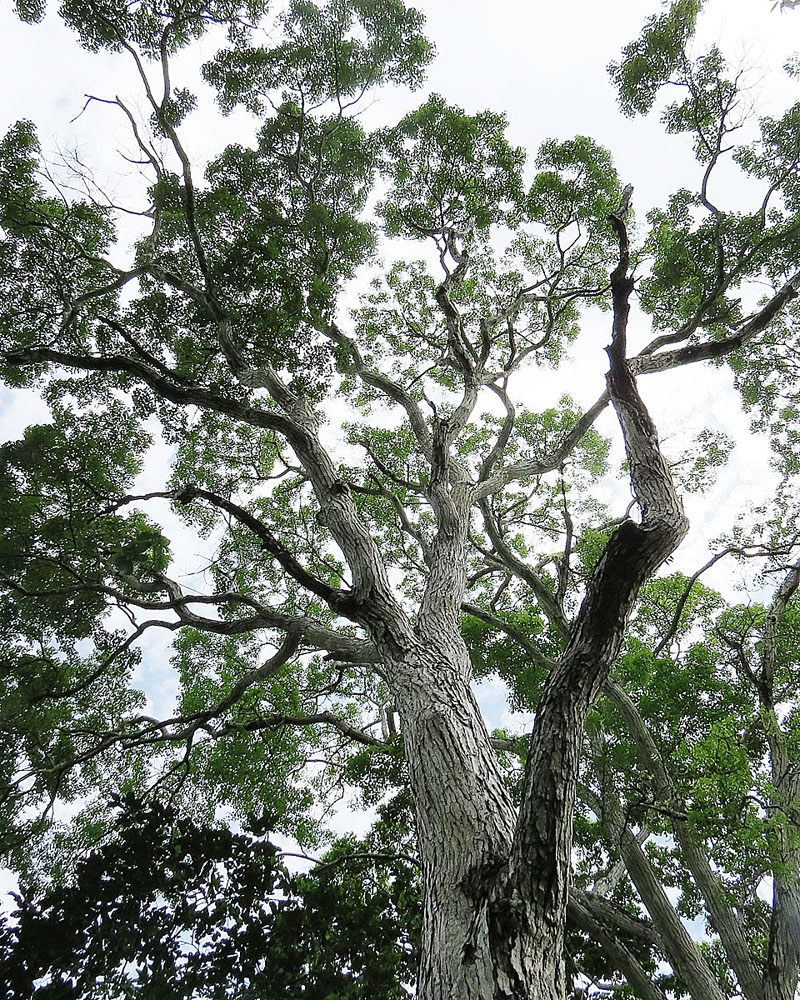
Mahogany

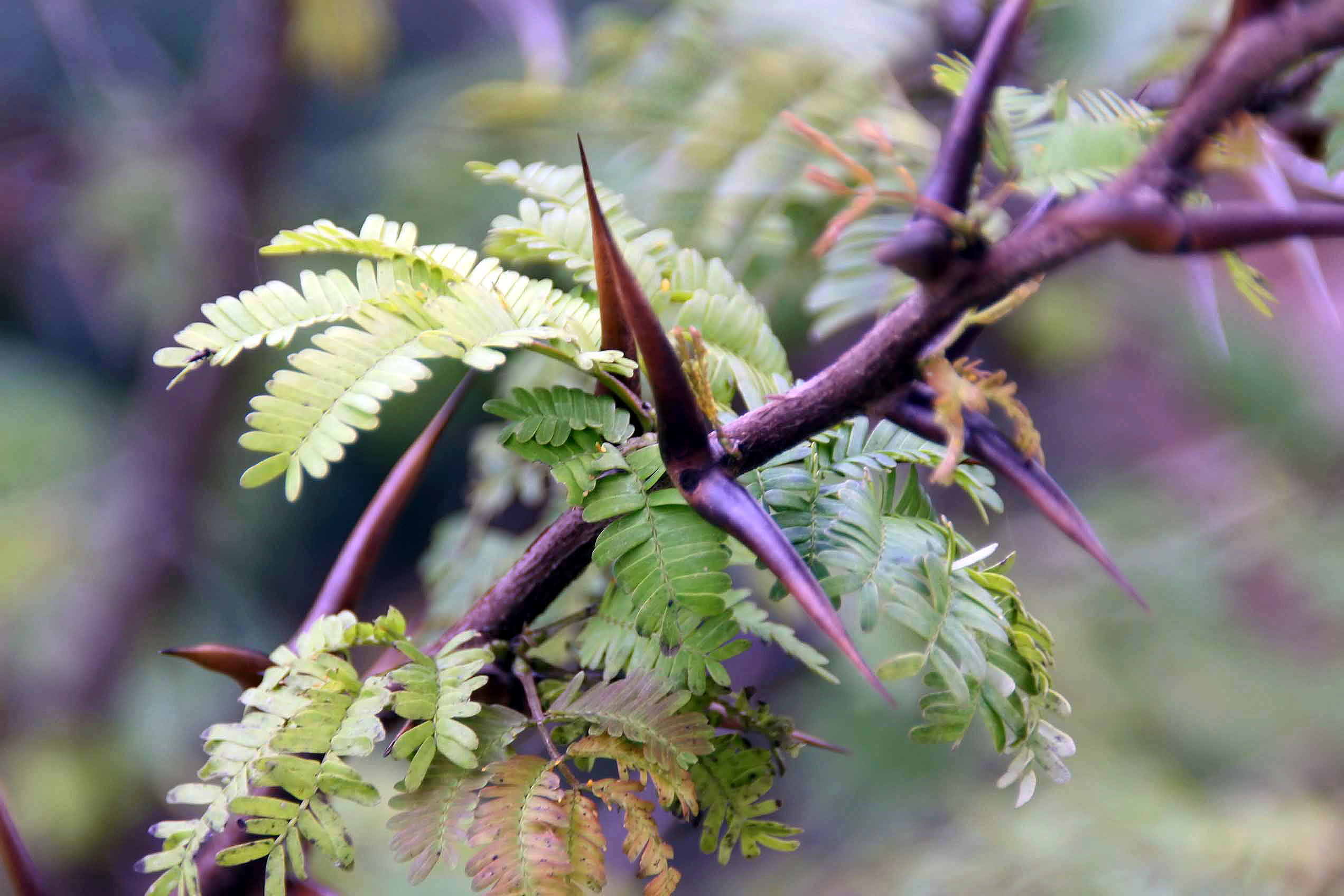
Bullhorn acacia

=== Endemic species ===
The White-breasted thrasher is a bird endemic to Martinique, found in the dry forest of the Caravelle peninsula and in Saint Lucia. Also endemic to the island is the Martinique oriole, known locally as the "Carouge", which belongs to the Icterid family of birds. Finally, Martinique has an endemic bat, Myotis Martiniquensis or Schwartz's myotis, a vesper bat which appears in the early to late evening. Martinique is home to 11 other species of bat.

The Lesser Antillean Iguana (Iguana delicatissima) is endemic to Martinique, Guadeloupe, St. Martin and some other smaller islands. This species is considered vulnerable by the IUCN, and is threatened, among other things, by hybridization with the Green iguana, an invasive alien species in Martinique.

Allobates chalcopis, or the ravine rocket frog, is a species of frog endemic to Mount Pelee.

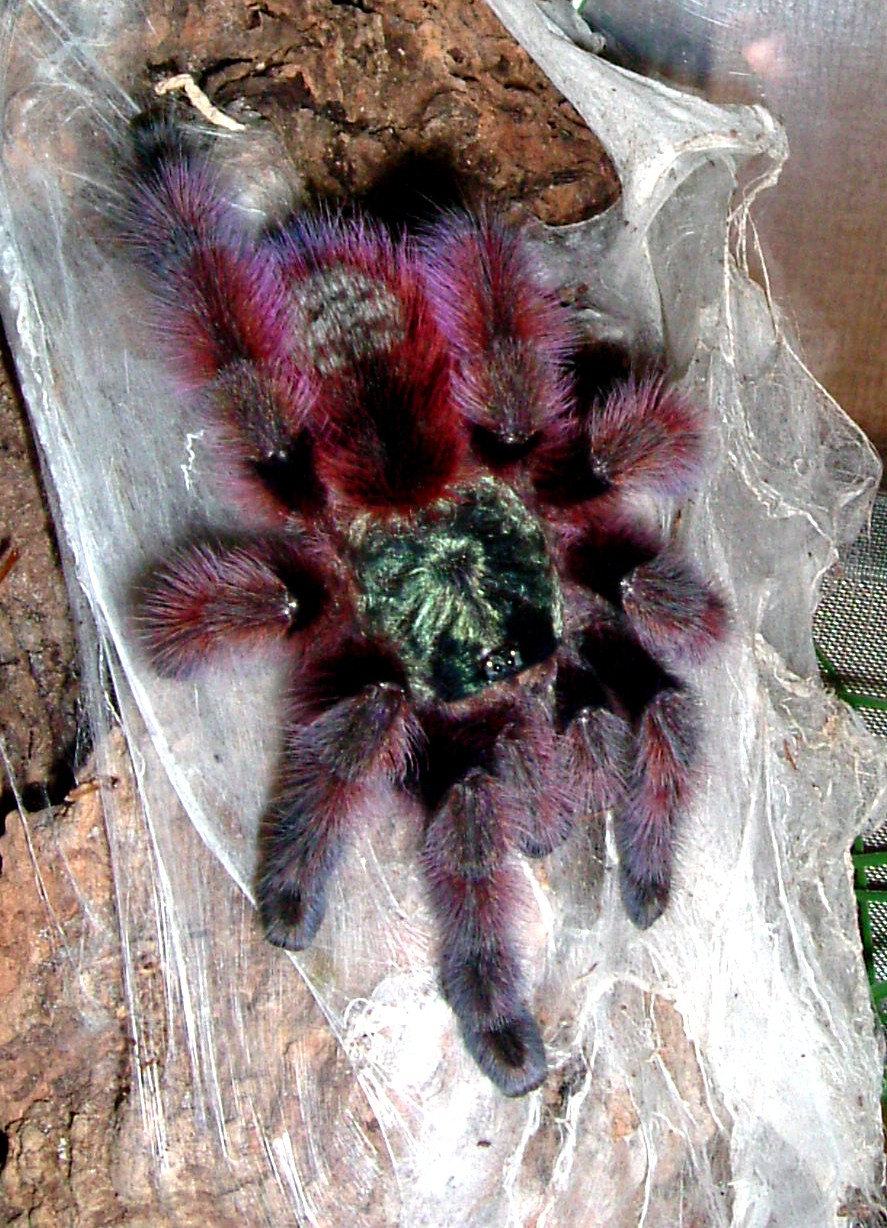
Caribena versicolor or Antilles pinktoe tarantula

The Antilles pinktoe tarantula or Matoutou falaise is an endemic species of tree-dwelling mygalomorphs. Its young are dark blue with black stripes on the abdomen. Adults can be identified by their bright red abdomen decorated with a pink spot, with purplish pink legs; they can reach a size of 15 cm (5.9 in) across. It is not advisable to touch these tarantulas because their bristles sting.

Martinique has 95 species of insects (or more generally hexapoda) which are strictly endemic including Athis pinchoni, a moth.

The bromeliad aechmea reclinata is an endemic epiphytic plant species that was discovered very recently by botanists of the Martinique National Park. It has lost a large part of its distribution area due to illegal forest clearing where it used to grow.

=== Extinct or locally extinct species ===
According to the IUCN, cited in the park's charter, eleven species have disappeared from Martinique, including the Lamentin, the Ara (endemic to the two islands of Guadeloupe and Martinique), the Martinique amazon, the Burrowing owl and the Boa constrictor.

=== Invasive alien species ===
In total, 38% of vertebrate fauna are thought to have been introduced by humans. All these species are considered harmful and some are already causing problems for local wildlife.

In the wetlands several exotic plants have become established such as water hyacinth, Pistia stratiotes, Hydrilla verticillata and Salvinia molesta.

== Geology ==
The island of Martinique is mainly volcanic, being formed in three main stages of volcanism:

1. Eocene-Oligocene, i.e. 25-21 million years ago, evidenced in places on the Caravelle and Sainte-Anne peninsula;
2. Intermediate period between 17 and 7 million years ago during the Miocene
3. Recent era, beginning 5.5 million years ago (Pliocene-Pleistocene) until the present day. This includes the formation of Mount Pelee, which became active 126,000 years ago and has erupted in the modern era, in particular in 1902.

Of the 43 geological heritage sites identified by the Bureau de recherches géologiques et minières in Martinique, 34 are located within the perimeter of the park.

== Landscape and environment ==
=== North and South landscapes ===
The landscapes of Martinique are classified into six groups, which in turn divide into 27 habitats. The regional nature park includes examples of each.

Topology differs between the north and the south divided along a line between Fort-de-France on the Caribbean coast, to Trinité facing the Atlantic:

The north has steep slopes with mountains which can climb to over 1,000 m (3,300 ft), Mount Pelée the highest, at 1,397 m (4,583 ft). The mountains are carved by deep gullies. There is dense forest vegetation, accompanied by water-demanding crops such as bananas.

Geological formations in the South are older and the topography is closer to sea level, only exceeding 500 m (1,600 ft) at a point, the coasts are more indented, and here sedimentary rocks become visible among the ancient basalts. Settlements are more agricultural, typically divided between cattle breeding and sugar cane cultivation.

=== Wetlands ===
In 2012, 1230 wetlands were identified on the whole island of Martinique, categorised into 156 "ecosystems", covering a total surface area of 2,700 ha (10 sq mi). These include man-made environments, areas which are always waterlogged, or only during the wet season and the water may be fresh, salt or brackish. These environments are home to a variety of fauna, and provide a stopover for birds. In 2015, during the last census, 2276 ponds, marshes, ponds, riparian areas, lagoons and aquaculture or purification basins of ecological interest were listed.

=== Mangroves ===
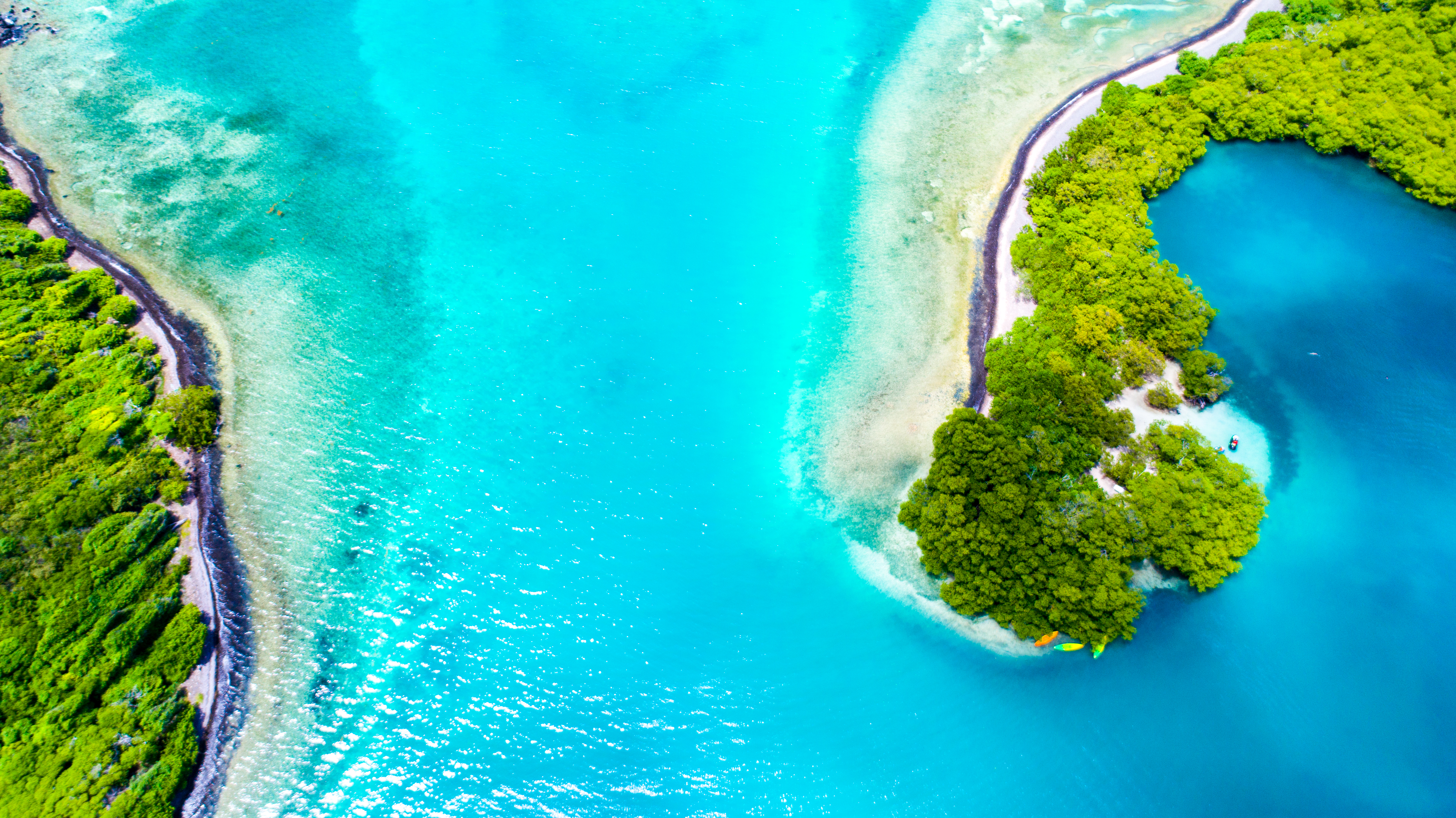
Aerial view of Vauclin's mangrove

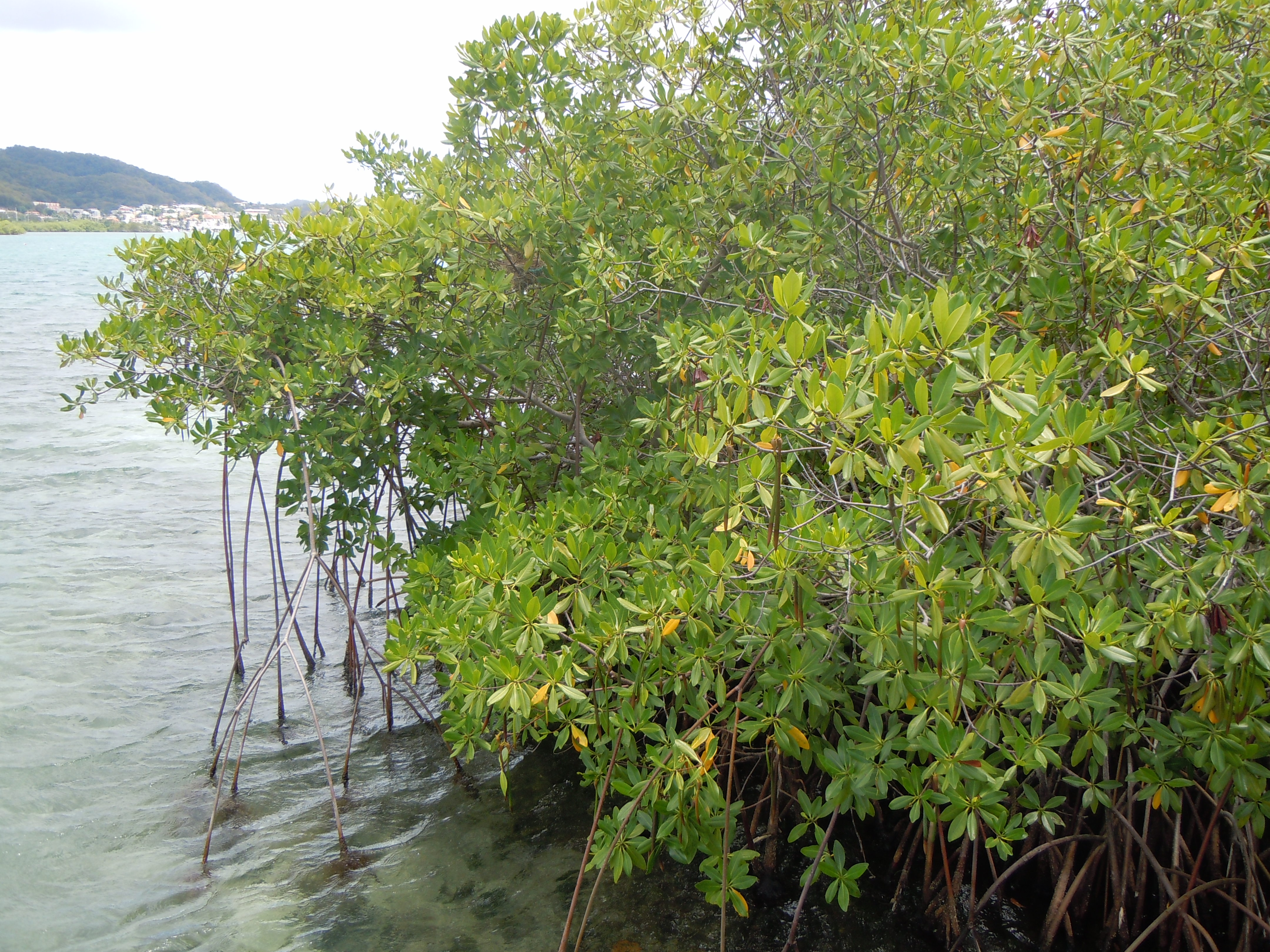
Small mangrove on Îlet Duprey

Salt tolerant trees, known as mangroves, grow in the island's tidal zone. The ecosystem covers 1,800 ha (6.9 sq mi) to 2,100 ha (8.1 sq mi), the largest areas being located in the bay of Fort-de-France (on the Caribbean coast to the west) for about 1,100 ha (4.2 sq mi) and to the east, in the bay of Galion (commune of La Trinité). They grow in a pattern similar to Guadeloupe's mangroves, in three zones: red mangrove growing closest to the sea, then black mangrove and finally white and grey, most inland. It provides a home for snowy egrets, green herons and little blue herons.

The "Baie de Génipa" site, in the south-eastern end of the bay of Fort-de-France, is home to 93 species of birds. It represents 65% of the mangroves in Martinique with 153 recorded plant species. The Regional Nature Park is planning to have the bay classified as a regional nature reserve. In the two areas mentioned above, the substrate is clay. There are also mangrove massifs on clay-sand substrate, scattered on the Atlantic coast and to the south of Martinique, sometimes merging with the forest.

A study of ecosystem service, published in April 2017, estimates the economic contribution of the mangrove to the fishery sector at €15,143,000, plus €63,000 for "pêche vivrière" or fishing for food. Mangroves add to the beauty of the area, provide habitat for wildlife and a space for outdoor activities. The benefit they provide as a buffer to erosion is equally important: in 2013 the Ministry of Overseas France estimated the coastal protection and stabilisation provided by mangroves at €8,064 per hectare each year.

=== Forests in Martinique ===
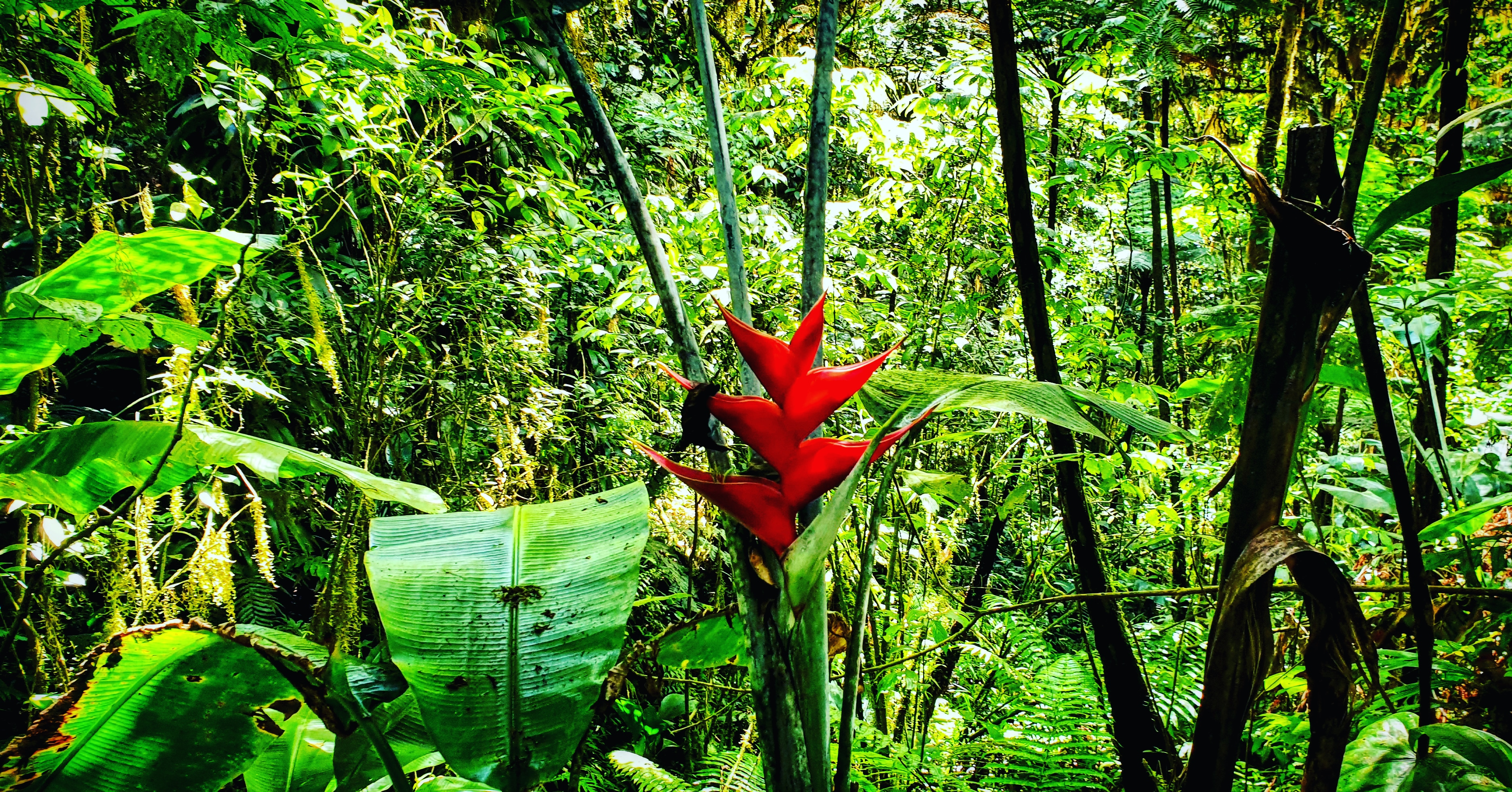
Martinique forest

Martinique is home to a great diversity of forest environments. In particular, on the slopes of Mount Pelée and the Carbet Mountains, forest cover is almost continuous (28% fragmentation) from sea level to more than 1,300 m (4,300 ft) in altitude:

- Elfin forest
  - Tropical mountain rainforest
    - Tropical rainforest
      - Tropical seasonal evergreen forest
        - Dry forest
          - Coastal forest

The type of forest which develops depends on rainfall. The Atlantic coast receives more rain, so the tropical rainforest extends lower in altitude; dry forest is more common on the Caribbean coast. The forest in the north of Martinique is essentially "primitive" (primary). Its secondary forest is concentrated on lower levels, up to 400 m (1,300 ft) in altitude. Due to climatic and edaphic soil conditions caused by the gradient, means that even when the forest is mature, it will not necessarily develop into a climax community.

A vast wooded area descends from Morne-Rose to the sea, on the slopes of the Carbet Mountains, composed of a mesophilic forest at the highest altitudes changing to dry forest or shrubs at lower levels.

The second continuum is located in the north of Martinique, on the steep slopes of the Piton Mont Conil and it is protected by two integral biological reserves: "Prêcheur-Grande-rivière" and "Montagne Pelée". There are areas of primary mesophilic forest, home to rare species such as Manilkara bidentata. However, at lower altitudes the forest was cleared for cash crops in the 18th century, then in the 19th for cocoa cultivation, shown by the presence of Samanea saman, a tree of Brazilian origin used as a shade plant.

==== Dry Forest ====
A few isolated areas of dry forest have been maintained on the Caribbean coast of Martinique, despite being very degraded. Bursera simaruba, Ficus laevigata, Tabebuia pallida and T. heterophylla (two species of pear tree) are characteristic of dry forest, where rainfall is between 1,500 mm (59 in) and 1,000 mm (39 in) per year.

==== Mesophilic forest ====
Mesophilic forest grows in the north of the island, from the coast to about 400 m (1,300 ft) in altitude, as well as by pocket in the south of Martinique. As cultures have tended to settle here over the history of the island, it is usually secondary forest, including trees such as Simarouba amara (bois-blanc) and Inga laurina (Pois-doux).

==== Tropical rainforest ====
The rainforest receives between 3,000 mm (120 in) and 6,000 mm (240 in) of water per year. The trees are very tall, reaching up to 40 m (130 ft) in height, and the characteristic species are Dacryodes excelsa (white gum tree), Chimarrhis cymosa (river wood), Sloanea truncata or Talauma dodeca petala (a Magnolia), accompanied by coconut trees and tree ferns. Epiphytes are very common.

==== Mountain rainforest ====
The upper transitional rainforest, is the transition from the upper mountain shrublands. Trees are on average less tall and forest cover is less dense, which allows for more development of plants in the understorey. Epiphytes are extremely abundant: lianas, mosses, ferns, etc. Micropholis guyanensis, Pouteria pallida in the Sapotaceae family or Myrcia deflexa (Myrtaceae) and Prestoea montana (a palm tree), already present in the rainforest, become dominant in this zone.

==== Elfin forest ====
These woodlands are referred to as "forêt des elfes" because of their stunted height, and the reliability of misty, humid conditions in the high elevations where they grow, which they rely on for moisture.

== Historical and cultural heritage ==
=== Creole culture ===
The Creole culture of Martinique is inherited from multiple sources, a mixture of the Amerindian culture of the Taïnos, the first inhabitants of the island, with European and African cultures. This culture is carried through by the Creole language and expressed in the island's built heritage and islander's traditional knowledge.

The park supports cultural transmission by providing educational activities in schools and in practice, by communicating in Creole in its official documents (as proposed in its charter, signed in 2012).

=== Local crafts ===
==== Pottery ====
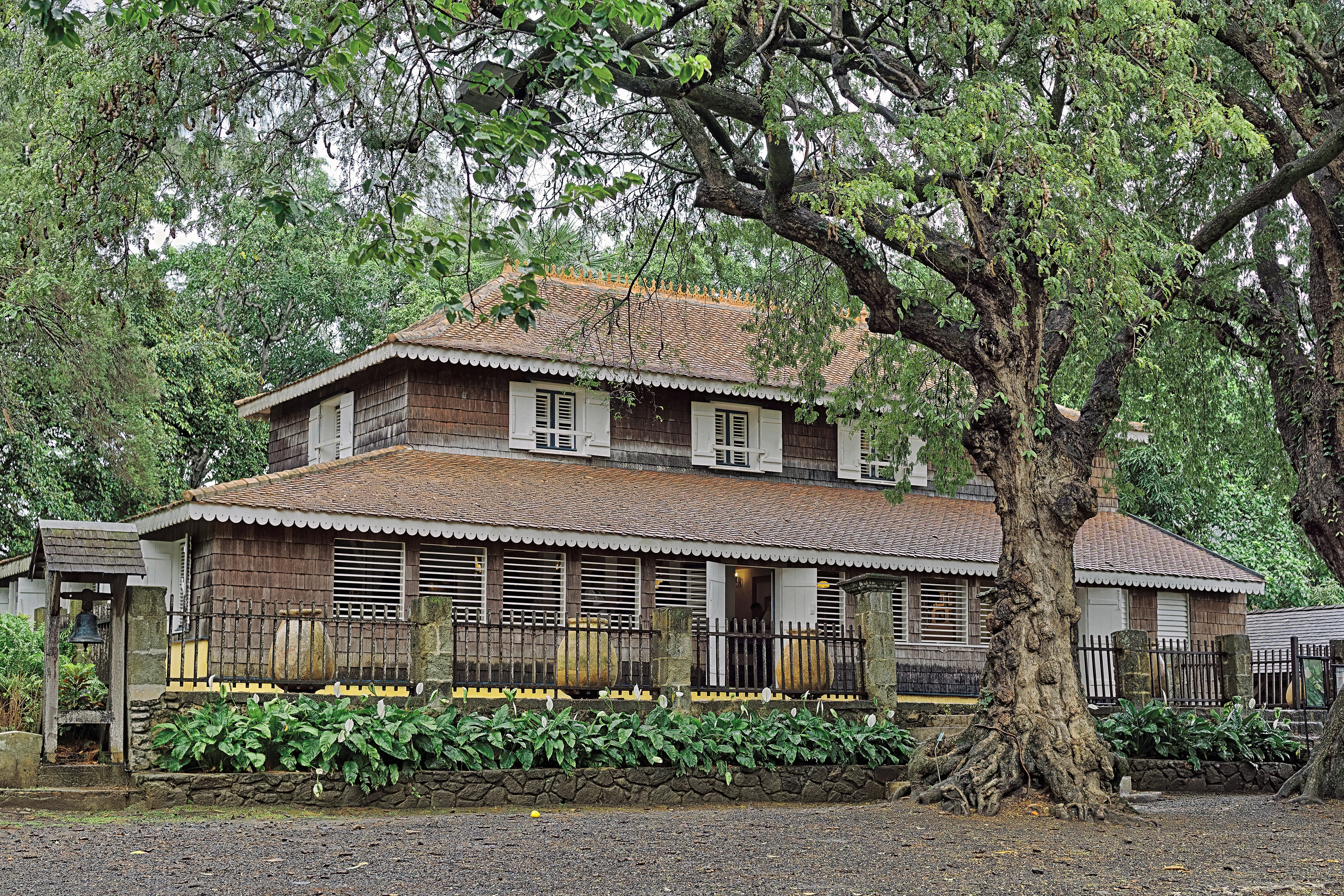
Historic Creole house, with rounded roof tiles

Amerindians used the islands' numerous deposits of clay to make pottery from their earliest days in Martinique. "Canari", "Coco-neg" or "Tesson" kitchen utensils still made today using the Colombin technique, are the heirs of this Arawak tradition.

With colonisation, a ceramics industry developed. The range of pottery being made on the island expanded from everyday objects to moulds for the sugar industry, bricks and round roof tiles. A pottery established in the 17th century is still in operation in Trois-Îlets.

==== Basketry, braiding, rope making ====
Basketry and weaving techniques have their origins in the practices of the early Amerindian inhabitants. Several local plants, often palms, are used as materials for various purposes:

- Aroman (Ischnosiphon arouma) and cachibou (Calathea lutea) are used in weaving, for example to make baskets.
- Bakwa (Pandanus utilis) and latanier (Latania lontaroides) are woven and assembled in a spiral shape to make Bakwa hats. Traditionally, fishermen wore a hat woven into a conical shape, while farmers wore a round hat.
- Banana fibres (Musa genus) are used to weave ropes that were once used to tie up pirogues or cattle.

== Agriculture ==
=== Banana plantations ===
The first banana trees were cultivated in the French West Indies at the turn of the 17th and 18th centuries as a shade plant for cocoa and coffee crops, giant grasses were also used to feed the workers on these plantations. From 1736 onwards, by royal decree, a minimum number of banana trees had to be planted on the plantations to feed the slaves, who could also grow bananas for their own benefit. In 1928, a cyclone damaged coffee and cocoa plantations so badly, that farmers began to grow bananas instead. In 1933, regular shipping was set up between Martinique and the France. Banana plantations became widespread on the island thereafter.

However, use of pesticides, in particular chlordecone, has caused extensive pollution.

A study published in 2015 by 15 contributors assessed biodiversity in banana plantations in Guadeloupe and Martinique, and the results tend to show that some biodiversity has returned to plantations after the end of chlordecone use. This is particularly the case for soil macrofauna and birds, compared to another study made in 2008. Herpetofauna are diverse, with a higher density in comparison to forest environments. Arthropod diversity is low compared to natural environments. Overall, most species there are common and the biodiversity now present depends a great deal on the continued use of phytosanitary irradiation treatments on farms.

=== The Creole garden ===
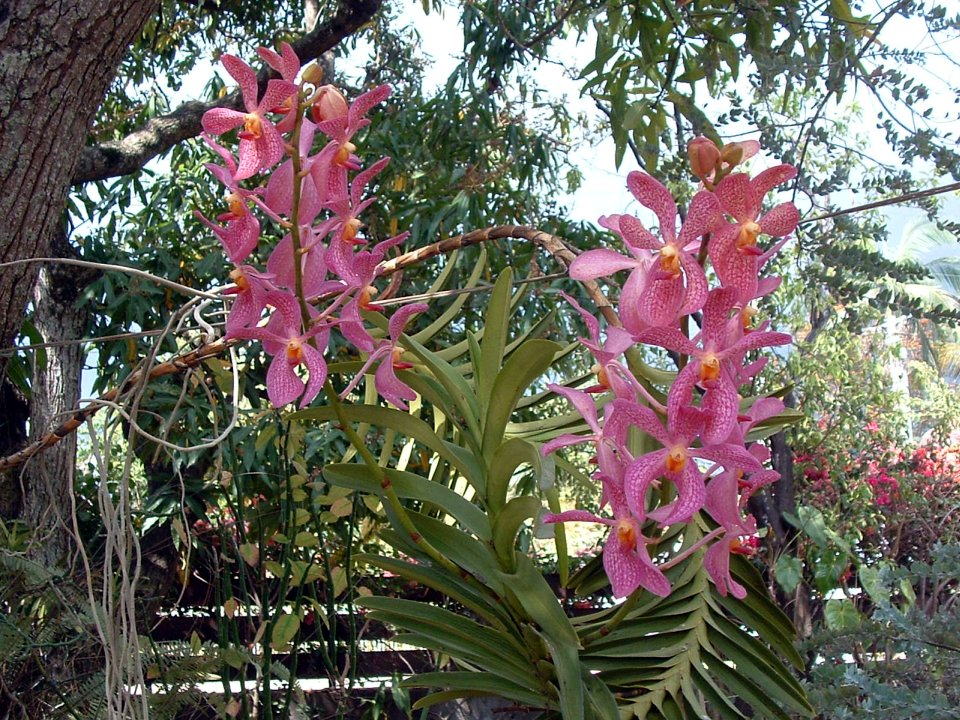
Orchids in a Creole garden

Creole gardens are kept near the home, in small plots. This type of landscaping is found in particular on the hillslopes of the south, where terrain is too uneven to build on. Gardens grow breadfruit trees, coconut trees, mango trees, citrus trees, sweet potatoes, taros, yams, cassava and other local vegetables. In addition to food crops, sections contain aromatic and medicinal plants and small-scale livestock farming. The Creole garden appeared with the abolition of slavery, when former slaves settled on cleared land, and developed further with the decline of the sugar industry, which employed many agricultural workers.

=== Support programmes for the farming community ===
The Regional Nature Park supports the agricultural sector, with aid programmes for:

- the development of anthurium cultivation, through development of greenhouses and agricultural education.
- The planting of "living hedges" on sheep farms and their scientific study in collaboration with the University of West Indies-Guyana. Since the 1920s, Gliciridia sepium has been planted as a fodder hedge, and at the southern tip of the island, acacia sundra or ox-stop is the main component of the hedges.
- The reintroduction of donkeys and mules for agricultural transport in steep areas, logging and tourism.

== Caribbean natural parks ==
The territorial waters of Martinique are protected by the Parc naturel marin de Martinique.

The Regional Nature Park of Martinique participates in the Cartagena Protocol on Biosafety and the programme on the marine environment of the greater Caribbean region, set up by agreement between France and the United Nations Environment Programme.

The Guadeloupe National Park is another protected area in the French West Indies. To launch its programme of international cooperation, the Parc naturel régional de la Martinique carried out a consultancy mission for the creation of a discovery trail across the island of Dominica, from north to south.
