= Athis rutila =

Scientific classification
- Domain: Eukaryota
- Kingdom: Animalia
- Phylum: Arthropoda
- Class: Insecta
- Order: Lepidoptera
- Family: Castniidae
- Genus: Athis
- Species: A. rutila

Binomial name
- Athis rutila (R. Felder, 1874)

Synonyms
- Castnia rutila R. Felder, 1874; Aciloa rutiloides Houlbert, 1918

Species of moth

Athis rutila is a moth in the Castniidae family. It is found in Brazil (upper Amazonas), Venezuela, French Guiana and Peru.

The larvae feed on epiphytic Bromelia species.

== Subspecies ==
- Athis rutila rutila (Upper Amazonas)
- Athis rutila rutiloides (Houlbert, 1918) (Peru)
