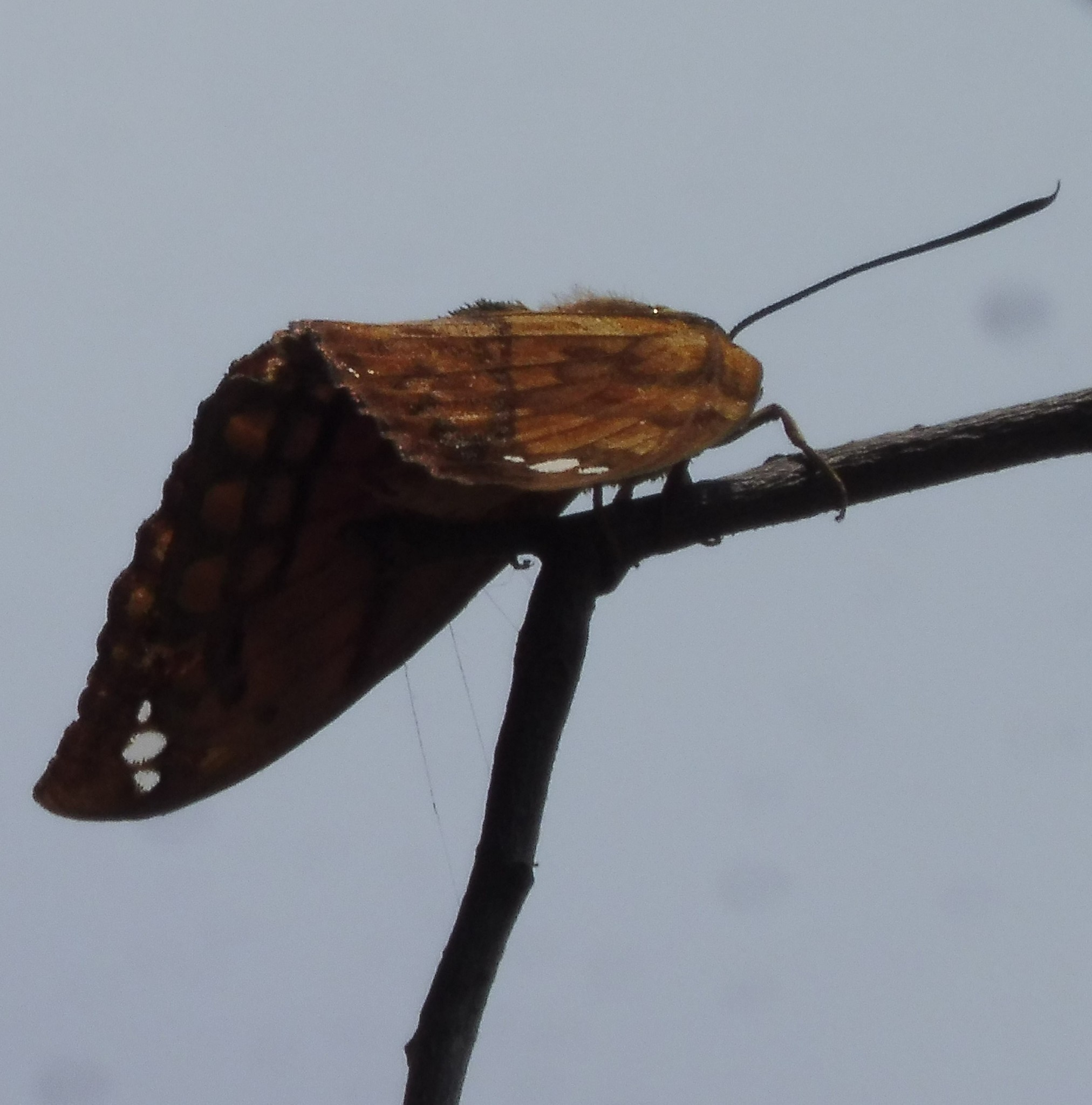

Scientific classification
- Kingdom: Animalia
- Phylum: Arthropoda
- Clade: Pancrustacea
- Class: Insecta
- Order: Lepidoptera
- Family: Castniidae
- Genus: Athis
- Species: A. flavimaculata

Binomial name
- Athis flavimaculata (Miller, 1972)

Synonyms
- Castnia flavimaculata Miller, 1972

= Athis flavimaculata =

Species of moth

Athis flavimaculata is a moth in the Castniidae family. It is found in Costa Rica and the Mexican states of Morelos and Guerrero.
