= Athis amalthaea =

Scientific classification
- Domain: Eukaryota
- Kingdom: Animalia
- Phylum: Arthropoda
- Class: Insecta
- Order: Lepidoptera
- Family: Castniidae
- Genus: Athis
- Species: A. amalthaea

Binomial name
- Athis amalthaea (H. Druce, 1890)

Synonyms
- Castnia amalthaea H. Druce, 1890

Species of moth

Athis amalthaea is a moth in the family Castniidae first described by Herbert Druce in 1890. It is found in Brazil.
