= Athis axaqua =

Scientific classification
- Domain: Eukaryota
- Kingdom: Animalia
- Phylum: Arthropoda
- Class: Insecta
- Order: Lepidoptera
- Family: Castniidae
- Genus: Athis
- Species: A. axaqua

Binomial name
- Athis axaqua González & Fernández Yépez, 1992

Species of moth

Athis axaqua is a moth in the Castniidae family. It is found from north-central to south-western of Venezuela and might reach south-eastern Colombia.

The larvae feed on Billbergia species.
