= Athis palatinus =

Scientific classification
- Domain: Eukaryota
- Kingdom: Animalia
- Phylum: Arthropoda
- Class: Insecta
- Order: Lepidoptera
- Family: Castniidae
- Genus: Athis
- Species: A. palatinus

Binomial name
- Athis palatinus (Cramer, [1777])

Synonyms
- Papilio palatinus Cramer, [1777]; Castnia palatinus; Aciloa pallida Lathy, 1922; Aciloa ferruginosa Lathy, 1922; Castnia palatinoides Houlbert, 1917; Castnia staudingeri Druce, 1896

Species of moth

Athis palatinus is a moth in the Castniidae family. It is found from Mexico south to Peru and Brazil (including Trinidad, Guyana, French Guiana, Suriname, Venezuela, Ecuador and southern Colombia).

Adults have been observed feeding at flowers of Warszewiczia coccinea.

== Subspecies ==
- Athis palatinus palatinus (Surinam, Trinidad)
- Athis palatinus ferruginosa (Lathy, 1922) (Peru)
- Athis palatinus palatinoides (Houlbert, 1917) (Peru)
- Athis palatinus staudingeri (Druce, 1896) (Panama)
