= Regional nature parks of France =

French regional natural parks (in green), national parks (in red) and marine natural parks (in blue).

A regional nature park or regional natural park (French: parc naturel régional or PNR) is a public establishment in France between local authorities and the French national government covering an inhabited rural area of outstanding beauty in order to protect the scenery and heritage as well as set up sustainable economic development in the area.

A PNR sets goals and guidelines for managed human habitation, sustainable economic development, and the protection of the natural environment based on each park's unique landscape and heritage. The parks also foster ecological research programs and public education in the natural sciences.

As of July 2026, there are 60 PNRs. Together they cover more than 9.8 million hectares, or 16.1% of French territory, and include more than 5,200 communes with a population of 5.2 million.. The PNR system was created by a decree of March 1, 1967. The park charter and classification are adopted by decree for a period of fifteen years.

== Regional natural parks ==
In total 60 PNRs have been created, of which one subsequently lost its status and one was renamed. They are listed here in the chronological order of creation.

- Parc naturel régional Scarpe-Escaut (13 September 1968) website
- Parc naturel régional d'Armorique (30 September 1969) website
- Parc naturel régional de Camargue (25 September 1970) website
- Parc naturel régional de Brière (16 October 1970) website
- Parc naturel régional de la Forêt d'Orient (16 October 1970) website
- Parc naturel régional des Landes de Gascogne (16 October 1970) website
- Parc naturel régional du Morvan (16 October 1970) website
- Parc naturel régional du Vercors (16 October 1970) website
- Parc naturel régional de Corse (12 May 1972) naturel-corse.com website
- Parc naturel régional du Haut-Languedoc (22 October 1973) website
- Parc naturel régional de Brotonne (17 May 1974. Now known as PNR Boucles de la Seine Normande)
- Parc naturel régional de Lorraine (17 May 1974) website
- Parc naturel régional du Pilat (17 May 1974) website
- Parc naturel régional Normandie-Maine (23 October 1975) website
- Parc naturel régional des Vosges du Nord (14 February 1976) website
- Parc naturel régional de la Martinique (10 September 1976) website
- Parc naturel régional de la Montagne de Reims (28 September 1976) website
- Parc naturel régional du Luberon (31 January 1977) website
- Parc naturel régional du Queyras (31 January 1977) website
- Parc naturel régional des volcans d'Auvergne (25 October 1977) website
- Parc naturel régional du Marais poitevin (created 1979, lost its status 1997)
- Parc naturel régional de la haute vallée de Chevreuse (11 December 1985) website
- Parc naturel régional Livradois-Forez (4 February 1986) website
- Parc naturel régional des Caps et Marais d'Opale (12 February 1986) website
- Parc naturel régional du Haut-Jura (21 April 1986) website
- Parc naturel régional des Ballons des Vosges (5 June 1989) website
- Parc naturel régional de la Brenne (22 December 1989) website
- Parc naturel régional des Marais du Cotentin et du Bessin (14 May 1991) website
- Parc Naturel Régional de la Chartreuse (6 May 1995) website
- Parc naturel régional des Grands Causses (6 May 1995)
- Parc naturel régional du Vexin français (9 May 1995) website
- Parc naturel régional du Massif des Bauges (7 December 1995) website
- Parc naturel régional Loire-Anjou-Touraine (30 May 1996) website
- Parc naturel régional du Verdon (3 March 1997) website
- Parc naturel régional du Perche (16 January 1998) website
- Parc naturel régional de l'Avesnois (13 March 1998) website
- Parc naturel régional Périgord Limousin (16 March 1998)
- Parc naturel régional du Gâtinais Français (4 May 1999)
- Parc naturel régional des Causses du Quercy (1 October 1999)
- Parc naturel régional de Guyane (26 March 2001)
- Parc naturel régional des Boucles de la Seine normande (4 April 2001) website
- Parc naturel régional des Monts d'Ardèche (9 April 2001) website
- Parc naturel régional de la Narbonnaise en Méditerranée (18 December 2003) website
- Parc naturel régional Oise-Pays de France (15 January 2004)
- Parc naturel régional des Pyrénées catalanes (5 March 2004)
- Parc naturel régional de Millevaches en Limousin (18 May 2004)
- Parc naturel régional des Alpilles (30 January 2007)
- Parc naturel régional des Pyrénées ariégeoises(30 May 2009) website
- Parc naturel régional des Ardennes (23 December 2011)
- Parc naturel régional des Préalpes d'Azur (30 March 2012)
- Parc naturel régional du Marais poitevin (20 May 2014)
- Parc naturel régional du Golfe du Morbihan (2 October 2014)
- Parc naturel régional des Baronnies provençales (26 January 2015)
- Parc naturel régional de la Sainte-Baume (20 December 2017)
- Parc naturel régional de l'Aubrac (23 May 2018)
- Parc naturel régional Médoc (26 May 2019)
- Parc naturel régional Baie de Somme - Picardie maritime (28 July 2020)
- Parc naturel régional du Mont-Ventoux (28 July 2020)
- Parc naturel régional Corbières-Fenouillèdes (4 September 2021)
- Parc naturel régional du Doubs Horloger (4 September 2021)
- Parc naturel régional Vallée de la Rance - Côte d'Émeraude (20 October 2024)
- Parc naturel régional Comminges-Barousse-Pyrénées (10 July 2026)

== See also ==
- List of national parks of France
