= Athis superba =

Scientific classification
- Domain: Eukaryota
- Kingdom: Animalia
- Phylum: Arthropoda
- Class: Insecta
- Order: Lepidoptera
- Family: Castniidae
- Genus: Athis
- Species: A. superba

Binomial name
- Athis superba (Strand, 1912)

Synonyms
- Castnia superba Strand, 1912; Aciloa orientalis Lathy, 1922

Species of moth

Athis superba is a moth in the Castniidae family. It is found in Peru and French Guiana.

== Subspecies ==
- Athis superba superba (Peru)
- Athis superba orientalis (Lathy, 1922) (French Guiana)
