= Athis fuscorubra =

Scientific classification
- Domain: Eukaryota
- Kingdom: Animalia
- Phylum: Arthropoda
- Class: Insecta
- Order: Lepidoptera
- Family: Castniidae
- Genus: Athis
- Species: A. fuscorubra

Binomial name
- Athis fuscorubra (Houlbert, 1917)

Synonyms
- Castnia fuscorubra Houlbert, 1917; Athis fournieri Lathy, 1922

Species of moth

Athis fuscorubra is a moth in the Castniidae family. It is found in Trinidad, Peru, Ecuador and Venezuela. It is probably also found in the Colombian Amazonas and north-western and northern Brazil.
