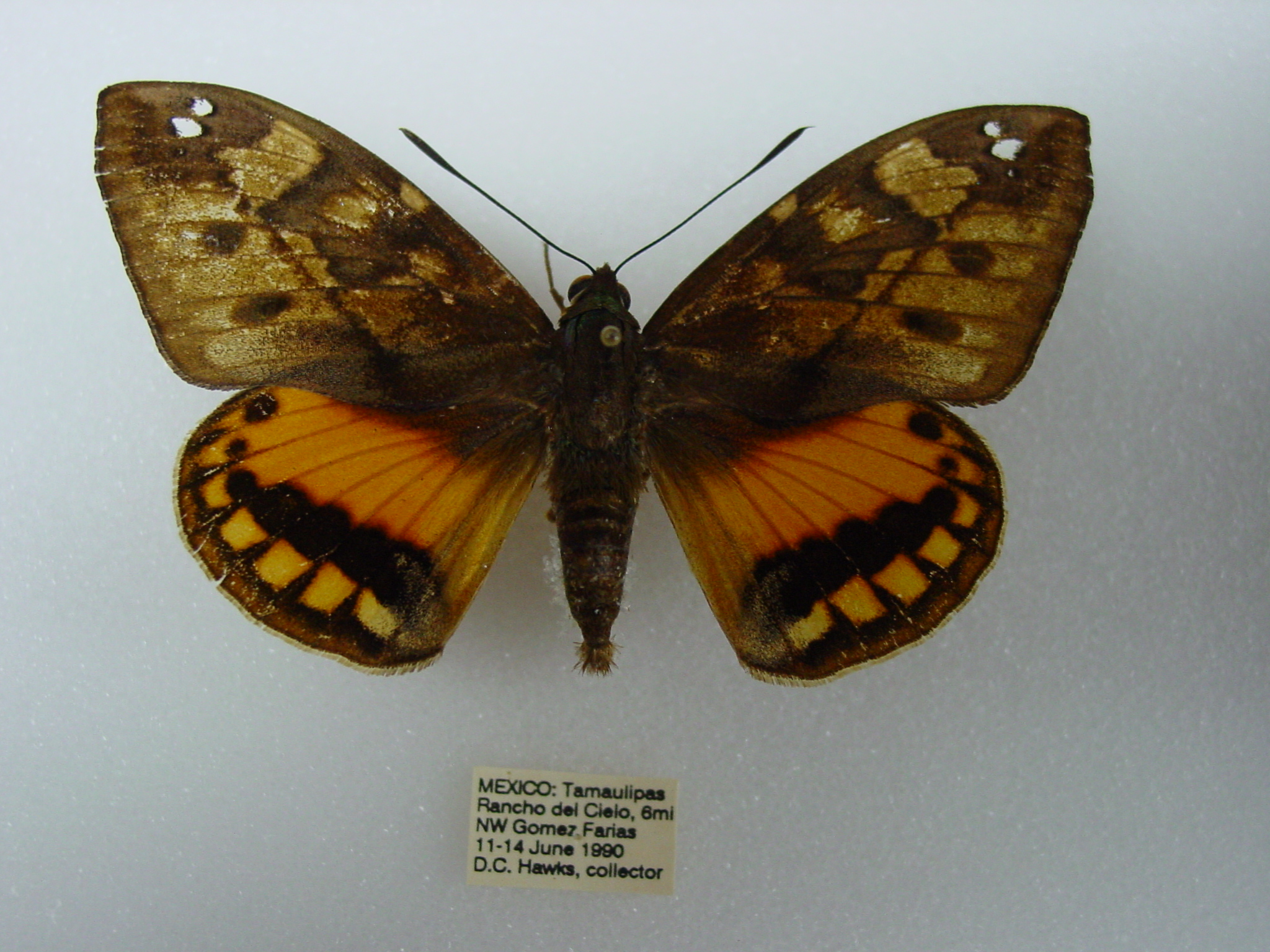
- Athis inca

Scientific classification
- Kingdom: Animalia
- Phylum: Arthropoda
- Clade: Pancrustacea
- Class: Insecta
- Order: Lepidoptera
- Family: Castniidae
- Genus: Athis; Hübner, [1819]

Synonyms
- Aciloa Houlbert, 1918

= Athis (moth) =

Genus of moths

Athis is a genus of moths within the family Castniidae. It was described by Jacob Hübner in 1819.

== Species ==
- Athis ahala (Druce, 1896)
- Athis amalthaea (Druce, 1890)
- Athis axaqua González & Fernández Yépez, 1992
- Athis bogota (Strand, 1912)
- Athis clitarcha (Westwood, 1877)
- Athis delecta (Schaus, 1911)
- Athis flavimaculata (Miller, 1972)
- Athis fuscorubra (Houlbert, 1917)
- Athis hechtiae (Dyar, 1910)
- Athis inca (Walker, 1854)
- Athis palatinus (Cramer, [1777])
- Athis pinchoni (Pierre, 2003)
- Athis pirrelloi Vinciguerra, 2011
- Athis rutila (R. Felder, 1874)
- Athis superba (Strand, 1912)
- Athis therapon (Kollar, 1839)
- Athis thysanete (Dyar, 1912)
