= Athis hechtiae =

Scientific classification
- Kingdom: Animalia
- Phylum: Arthropoda
- Class: Insecta
- Order: Lepidoptera
- Family: Castniidae
- Genus: Athis
- Species: A. hechtiae

Binomial name
- Athis hechtiae (Dyar, 1910)

Synonyms
- Castnia hechtiae Dyar, 1910; Castnia miastagma Dyar, 1915

Species of moth

Athis hechtiae is a moth in the Castniidae family. It is found in Mexico.
