= Athis therapon =

Scientific classification
- Domain: Eukaryota
- Kingdom: Animalia
- Phylum: Arthropoda
- Class: Insecta
- Order: Lepidoptera
- Family: Castniidae
- Genus: Athis
- Species: A. therapon

Binomial name
- Athis therapon (Kollar, 1839)

Synonyms
- Castnia therapon Kollar, 1839; Orthia paradoxa Herrich-Schäffer, [1853]

Species of moth

Athis therapon is a moth in the family Castniidae. It is found in Brazil. It was once introduced to New Jersey.

The larvae are a minor pest of Orchidaceae.
