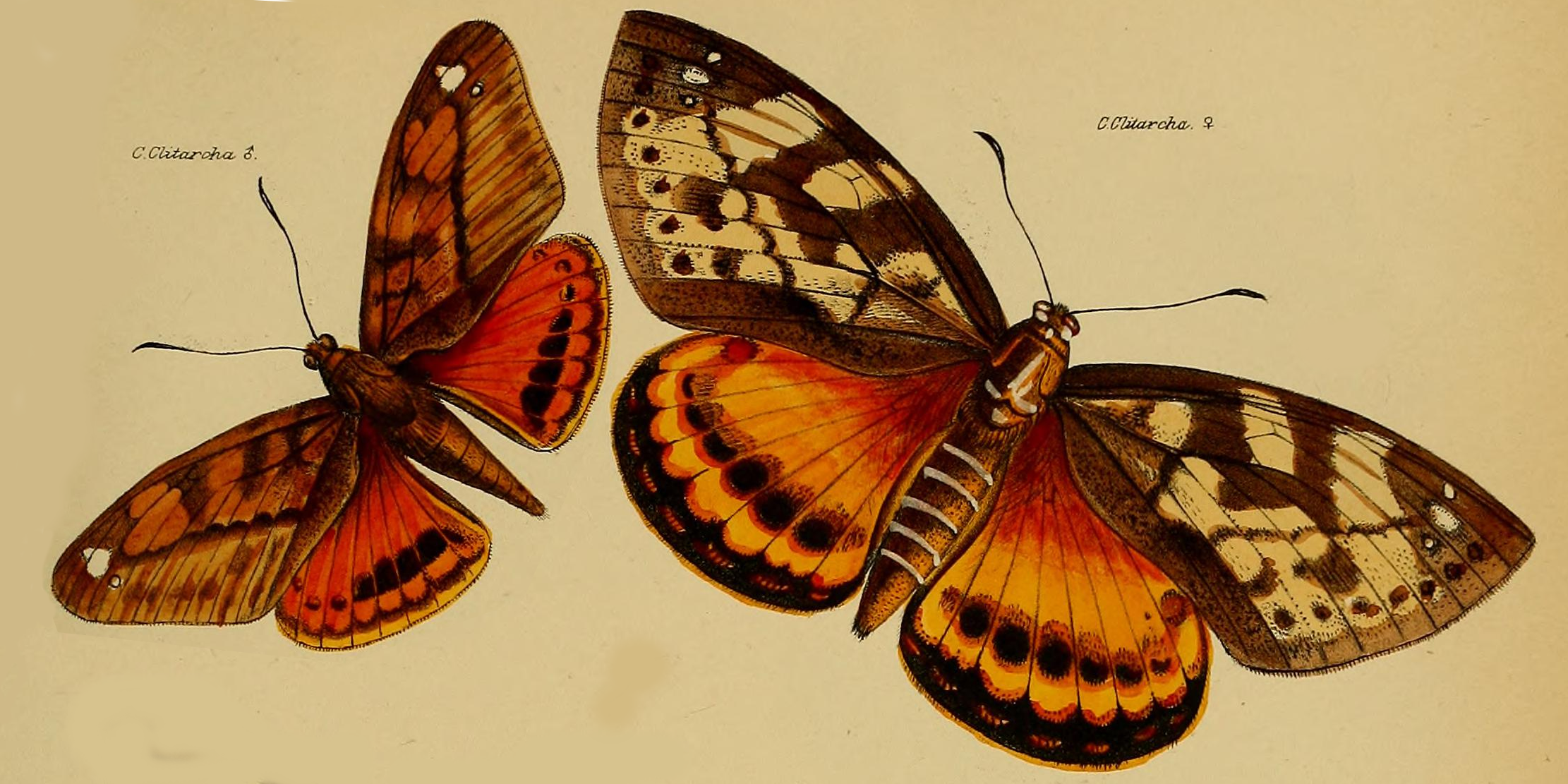
- Mounted specimens, male (left) and female (right)

Scientific classification
- Kingdom: Animalia
- Phylum: Arthropoda
- Class: Insecta
- Order: Lepidoptera
- Family: Castniidae
- Genus: Athis
- Species: A. clitarcha

Binomial name
- Athis clitarcha (Westwood, 1877)

Synonyms
- Castnia clitarcha Westwood, 1877

= Athis clitarcha =

Species of moth

Athis clitarcha is a moth in the Castniidae family. It is found in Panama, Nicaragua, Costa Rica and Honduras.
