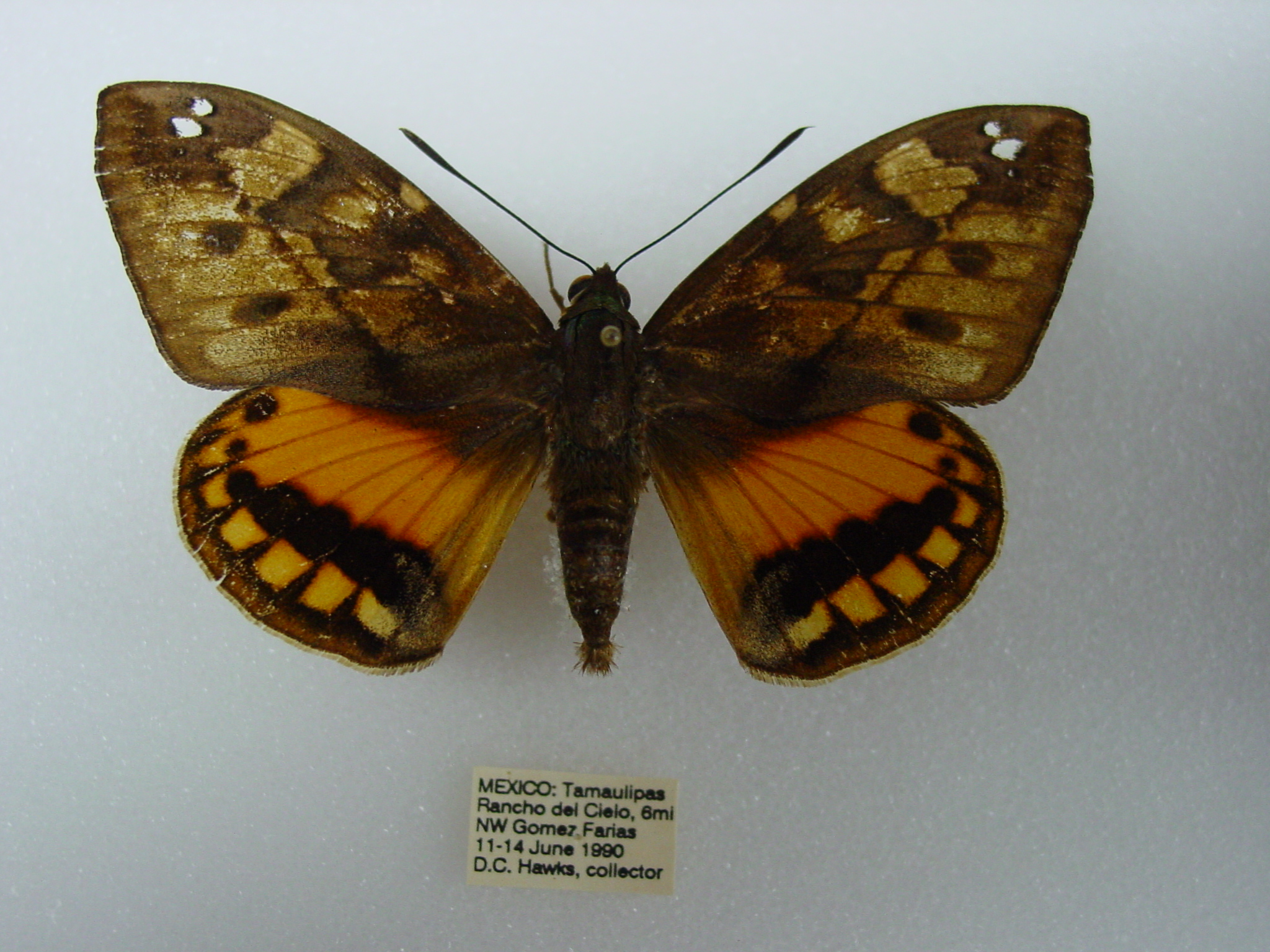

Scientific classification
- Kingdom: Animalia
- Phylum: Arthropoda
- Class: Insecta
- Order: Lepidoptera
- Family: Castniidae
- Genus: Athis
- Species: A. inca

Binomial name
- Athis inca (Walker, 1854)

Synonyms
- Castnia inca Walker, 1854; Castnia briareus Houbbert, 1917

= Athis inca =

Species of moth

Athis inca is a species of moth in the family Castniidae. It is found from Mexico to Costa Rica.

== Subspecies ==
- Athis inca inca - Honduras
- Athis inca briareus (Houlbert, 1917) - Mexico
- Athis inca dincadu (Miller, 1972) - Panama
- Athis inca orizabensis (Strand, 1913) - Mexico (Veracruz)
