= Athis delecta =

Scientific classification
- Domain: Eukaryota
- Kingdom: Animalia
- Phylum: Arthropoda
- Class: Insecta
- Order: Lepidoptera
- Family: Castniidae
- Genus: Athis
- Species: A. delecta

Binomial name
- Athis delecta (Schaus, 1911)

Synonyms
- Castnia delecta Schaus, 1911

Species of moth

Athis delecta is a moth in the Castniidae family. It is found in Costa Rica and Veracruz, Mexico.
