= Athis bogota =

Scientific classification
- Kingdom: Animalia
- Phylum: Arthropoda
- Class: Insecta
- Order: Lepidoptera
- Family: Castniidae
- Genus: Athis
- Species: A. bogota

Binomial name
- Athis bogota (Strand, 1912)

Synonyms
- Castnia bogota Strand, 1912

Species of moth

Athis bogota is a moth in the Castniidae family. It is found in Colombia.
