= Athis ahala =

Scientific classification
- Domain: Eukaryota
- Kingdom: Animalia
- Phylum: Arthropoda
- Class: Insecta
- Order: Lepidoptera
- Family: Castniidae
- Genus: Athis
- Species: A. ahala

Binomial name
- Athis ahala (H. Druce, 1896)

Synonyms
- Castnia ahala H. Druce, 1896

Species of moth

Athis ahala is a moth in the family Castniidae first described by Herbert Druce in 1896. It is found in Amazonas, Brazil.
