= Athis thysanete =

Scientific classification
- Domain: Eukaryota
- Kingdom: Animalia
- Phylum: Arthropoda
- Class: Insecta
- Order: Lepidoptera
- Family: Castniidae
- Genus: Athis
- Species: A. thysanete

Binomial name
- Athis thysanete (Dyar, 1912)

Synonyms
- Castnia thysanete Dyar, 1912

Species of moth

Athis thysanete is a moth in the Castniidae family. It is found in Mexico.
