= Athis pinchoni =

Scientific classification
- Domain: Eukaryota
- Kingdom: Animalia
- Phylum: Arthropoda
- Class: Insecta
- Order: Lepidoptera
- Family: Castniidae
- Genus: Athis
- Species: A. pinchoni

Binomial name
- Athis pinchoni (Pierre & Pierre-Baltus, 2003)

Synonyms
- Castnia (Athis) pinchoni Pierre & Pierre-Baltus, 2003

Species of moth

Athis pinchoni is a moth in the family Castniidae. It is found in Martinique in the Lesser Antilles.
