= List of Poaceae of South Africa =

List of flowering plants in the family Poaceae recorded from South Africa

Poaceae or Gramineae is a large and nearly ubiquitous family of monocotyledonous flowering plants in the order Poales, known as grasses. With around 780 genera and around 12,000 species, the Poaceae is the fifth-largest plant family, following the Asteraceae, Orchidaceae, Fabaceae and Rubiaceae.

The Poaceae are the most economically important plant family, providing staple foods from domesticated cereal crops such as maize, wheat, rice, barley, and millet as well as feed for meat-producing animals. They provide, through direct human consumption, just over one-half (51%) of all dietary energy. Some members of the Poaceae are used as building materials (bamboo, thatch, and straw); others can provide a source of biofuel, primarily via the conversion of maize to ethanol. Grasses have stems that are hollow except at the nodes and narrow alternate leaves borne in two ranks. The lower part of each leaf encloses the stem, forming a leaf-sheath. The leaf grows from the base of the blade, an adaptation allowing it to cope with frequent grazing.

Grasslands such as savannah and prairie where grasses are dominant are estimated to constitute 40.5% of the land area of the Earth, excluding Greenland and Antarctica. Grasses are also an important part of the vegetation in many other habitats, including wetlands, forests and tundra.

23,420 species of vascular plant have been recorded in South Africa, making it the sixth most species-rich country in the world and the most species-rich country on the African continent. Of these, 153 species are considered to be threatened. Nine biomes have been described in South Africa: Fynbos, Succulent Karoo, desert, Nama Karoo, grassland, savanna, Albany thickets, the Indian Ocean coastal belt, and forests.

The 2018 South African National Biodiversity Institute's National Biodiversity Assessment plant checklist lists 35,130 taxa in the phyla Anthocerotophyta (hornworts (6)), Anthophyta (flowering plants (33534)), Bryophyta (mosses (685)), Cycadophyta (cycads (42)), Lycopodiophyta (Lycophytes(45)), Marchantiophyta (liverworts (376)), Pinophyta (conifers (33)), and Pteridophyta (cryptogams (408)).

206 genera are represented in the literature. Listed taxa include species, subspecies, varieties, and forms as recorded, some of which have subsequently been allocated to other taxa as synonyms, in which cases the accepted taxon is appended to the listing. Multiple entries under alternative names reflect taxonomic revision over time.

== Achnatherum ==
Genus Achnatherum:

- Achnatherum clandestinum (Hack.) Barkworth, accepted as Amelichloa clandestina (Hack.) Arriaga & Barkworth, not indigenous, naturalised

== Acrachne ==
Genus Acrachne:

- Acrachne racemosa (B.Heyne ex Roem. & Schult.) Ohwi, indigenous

== Acroceras ==
Genus Acroceras:

- Acroceras macrum Stapf, indigenous

== Agrostis ==
Genus Agrostis:

- Agrostis avenacea C.C.Gmel. not indigenous, naturalised
- Agrostis barbuligera Stapf, indigenous
  - Agrostis barbuligera Stapf var. barbuligera, indigenous
  - Agrostis barbuligera Stapf var. longipilosa Gooss. & Papendorf, indigenous
- Agrostis bergiana Trin. indigenous
  - Agrostis bergiana Trin. var. bergiana, indigenous
  - Agrostis bergiana Trin. var. laeviuscula Stapf, indigenous
- Agrostis continuata Stapf, indigenous
- Agrostis eriantha Hack. indigenous
  - Agrostis eriantha Hack. var. eriantha, indigenous
  - Agrostis eriantha Hack. var. planifolia Gooss. & Papendorf, endemic
- Agrostis gigantea Roth, not indigenous, naturalised
- Agrostis griquensis Stapf, indigenous
- Agrostis lachnantha Nees, indigenous
  - Agrostis lachnantha Nees var. lachnantha, indigenous
- Agrostis montevidensis Spreng. ex Nees, not indigenous, naturalised
- Agrostis polypogonoides Stapf, endemic
- Agrostis schlechteri Rendle, endemic
- Agrostis subulifolia Stapf, indigenous

== Aira ==
Genus Aira:

- Aira cupaniana Guss. not indigenous, naturalised
- Aira praecox L. not indigenous, naturalised

== Alloteropsis ==
Genus Alloteropsis:

- Alloteropsis papillosa Clayton, indigenous
- Alloteropsis semialata (R.Br.) Hitchc. indigenous
  - Alloteropsis semialata (R.Br.) Hitchc. subsp. eckloniana (Nees) Gibbs Russ. indigenous
  - Alloteropsis semialata (R.Br.) Hitchc. subsp. semialata, indigenous

== Alopecurus ==
Genus Alopecurus:

- Alopecurus arundinaceus Poir. not indigenous, naturalised

== Amelichloa ==
Genus Amelichloa:

- Amelichloa clandestina (Hack.) Arriaga & Barkworth, not indigenous, naturalised

== Ammophila ==
Genus Ammophila:

- Ammophila arenaria (L.) Link, not indigenous, naturalised, invasive

== Andropogon ==
Genus Andropogon:

- Andropogon amethystinus Steud. indigenous
- Andropogon appendiculatus Nees, indigenous
- Andropogon chinensis (Nees) Merr. indigenous
- Andropogon distachyos L. indigenous
- Andropogon eucomus Nees, indigenous
- Andropogon fastigiatus Sw. indigenous
- Andropogon festuciformis Rendle, indigenous
- Andropogon gayanus Kunth, indigenous
  - Andropogon gayanus Kunth var. polycladus (Hack.) Clayton, indigenous
- Andropogon huillensis Rendle, indigenous
- Andropogon lacunosus J.G.Anderson, indigenous
- Andropogon laxatus Stapf, indigenous
- Andropogon mannii Hook.f. indigenous
- Andropogon ravus J.G.Anderson, indigenous
- Andropogon schirensis Hochst. ex A.Rich. indigenous

== Anthephora ==
Genus Anthephora:

- Anthephora argentea Gooss. indigenous
- Anthephora pubescens Nees, indigenous
- Anthephora ramosa Gooss. accepted as Anthephora pubescens Nees, present
- Anthephora schinzii Hack. indigenous

== Anthoxanthum ==
Genus Anthoxanthum:

- Anthoxanthum brevifolium Stapf, endemic
- Anthoxanthum dregeanum (Nees) Stapf, endemic
- Anthoxanthum ecklonii (Nees ex Trin.) Stapf, indigenous
- Anthoxanthum odoratum L. var. odoratum, not indigenous, naturalised
- Anthoxanthum tongo (Trin.) Stapf, endemic

== Aristida ==
Genus Aristida:

- Aristida adscensionis L. indigenous
- Aristida aequiglumis Hack. indigenous
- Aristida bifida Karl, accepted as Stipagrostis obtusa (Delile) Nees
- Aristida bipartita (Nees) Trin. & Rupr. indigenous
- Aristida canescens Henrard, indigenous
  - Aristida canescens Henrard subsp. canescens, indigenous
  - Aristida canescens Henrard subsp. ramosa De Winter, endemic
- Aristida congesta Roem. & Schult. indigenous
  - Aristida congesta Roem. & Schult. subsp. barbicollis (Trin. & Rupr.) De Winter, indigenous
  - Aristida congesta Roem. & Schult. subsp. congesta, indigenous
- Aristida curvata (Nees) T.Durand & Schinz var. nana Henrard, accepted as Aristida adscensionis L. present
- Aristida dasydesmis (Pilg.) Mez, endemic
- Aristida diffusa Trin. indigenous
  - Aristida diffusa Trin. subsp. burkei (Stapf) Melderis, indigenous
  - Aristida diffusa Trin. subsp. diffusa, endemic
- Aristida effusa Henrard, indigenous
- Aristida engleri Mez, indigenous
  - Aristida engleri Mez var. engleri, indigenous
  - Aristida engleri Mez var. ramosissima De Winter, indigenous
- Aristida junciformis Trin. & Rupr. indigenous
  - Aristida junciformis Trin. & Rupr. subsp. galpinii (Stapf) De Winter, indigenous
  - Aristida junciformis Trin. & Rupr. subsp. junciformis, indigenous
- Aristida meridionalis Henrard, indigenous
- Aristida mollissima Pilg. indigenous
  - Aristida mollissima Pilg. subsp. argentea (Schweick.) Melderis, indigenous
  - Aristida mollissima Pilg. subsp. mollissima, indigenous
- Aristida monticola Henrard, endemic
- Aristida parvula (Nees) De Winter, indigenous
- Aristida pilgeri Henrard, indigenous
- Aristida recta Franch. indigenous
- Aristida rhiniochloa Hochst. indigenous
- Aristida scabrivalvis Hack. indigenous
  - Aristida scabrivalvis Hack. subsp. contracta (De Winter) Melderis, indigenous
  - Aristida scabrivalvis Hack. subsp. scabrivalvis, indigenous
- Aristida sciurus Stapf, indigenous
- Aristida spectabilis Hack. indigenous
- Aristida stipitata Hack. indigenous
  - Aristida stipitata Hack. subsp. graciliflora (Pilg.) Melderis, indigenous
  - Aristida stipitata Hack. subsp. robusta (Stent & J.M.Rattray) Melderis, indigenous
  - Aristida stipitata Hack. subsp. spicata (De Winter) Melderis, indigenous
  - Aristida stipitata Hack. subsp. stipitata, indigenous
- Aristida transvaalensis Henrard, indigenous
- Aristida vestita Thunb. indigenous
  - Aristida vestita Thunb. var. eckloniana Trin. & Rupr. accepted as Aristida diffusa Trin. subsp. diffusa, present

== Arrhenatherum ==
Genus Arrhenatherum:

- Arrhenatherum elatius (L.) J.Presl & C.Presl, not indigenous, naturalised

== Arthratherum ==
Genus Arthratherum:

- Arthratherum capense Nees var. macropus Nees, accepted as Stipagrostis zeyheri (Nees) De Winter subsp. macropus (Nees) De Winter, present
- Arthratherum subacaule Nees, accepted as Stipagrostis subacaulis (Nees) De Winter, present
- Arthratherum zeyheri Nees, accepted as Stipagrostis zeyheri (Nees) De Winter subsp. zeyheri, present

== Arthraxon ==
Genus Arthraxon:

- Arthraxon lanceolatus (Roxb.) Hochst. indigenous
  - Arthraxon lanceolatus (Roxb.) Hochst. var. lanceolatus, indigenous

== Arundinella ==
Genus Arundinella:

- Arundinella nepalensis Trin. indigenous

== Arundo ==
Genus Arundo:

- Arundo donax L. not indigenous, naturalised, invasive

== Avena ==
Genus Avena:

- Avena barbata Pott ex Link, not indigenous, naturalised
- Avena byzantina K.Koch, not indigenous, naturalised
- Avena fatua L. not indigenous, naturalised
- Avena sativa L. not indigenous, naturalised
- Avena sterilis L. not indigenous, naturalised

== Axonopus ==
Genus Axonopus:

- Axonopus affinis Chase, not indigenous, naturalised

== Bambusa ==
Genus Bambusa:

- Bambusa balcooa Roxb. ex Roxb. not indigenous, naturalised

== Bewsia ==
Genus Bewsia:

- Bewsia biflora (Hack.) Gooss. indigenous

== Bothriochloa ==
Genus Bothriochloa:

- Bothriochloa bladhii (Retz.) S.T.Blake, indigenous
- Bothriochloa insculpta (Hochst. ex A.Rich.) A.Camus, indigenous
- Bothriochloa radicans (Lehm.) A.Camus, indigenous

== Brachiaria ==
Genus Brachiaria:

- Brachiaria advena Vickery, not indigenous, naturalised
- Brachiaria arrecta (Hack. ex T.Durand & Schinz) Stent, indigenous
- Brachiaria bovonei (Chiov.) Robyns, indigenous
- Brachiaria brizantha (A.Rich.) Stapf, indigenous
- Brachiaria chusqueoides (Hack.) Clayton, indigenous
- Brachiaria deflexa (Schumach.) C.E.Hubb. ex Robyns [1], indigenous
- Brachiaria dictyoneura (Fig. & De Not.) Stapf, indigenous
- Brachiaria dura Stapf, indigenous
  - Brachiaria dura Stapf var. pilosa J.G.Anderson, indigenous
- Brachiaria eruciformis (Sm.) Griseb. indigenous
- Brachiaria glomerata (Hack.) A.Camus, indigenous
- Brachiaria grossa Stapf, indigenous
- Brachiaria humidicola (Rendle) Schweick. indigenous
- Brachiaria marlothii (Hack.) Stent, indigenous
- Brachiaria nigropedata (Ficalho & Hiern) Stapf, indigenous
- Brachiaria serrata (Thunb.) Stapf, indigenous
- Brachiaria subulifolia (Mez) Clayton, indigenous
- Brachiaria umbellata (Trin.) Clayton, not indigenous, naturalised
- Brachiaria xantholeuca (Schinz) Stapf, indigenous

== Brachychloa ==
Genus Brachychloa:

- Brachychloa fragilis S.M.Phillips, indigenous
- Brachychloa schiemanniana (Schweick.) S.M.Phillips, indigenous

== Brachypodium ==
Genus Brachypodium:

- Brachypodium bolusii Stapf, indigenous
- Brachypodium distachyon (L.) P.Beauv. not indigenous, naturalised
- Brachypodium flexum Nees, indigenous
- Brachypodium fontanesianum Nees, accepted as Brachypodium flexum Nees, present

== Briza ==
Genus Briza:

- Briza geniculata Thunb. not indigenous, naturalised
- Briza maxima L. not indigenous, naturalised
- Briza minor L. not indigenous, naturalised
- Briza subaristatum Lam. not indigenous, naturalised

== Brizopyrum ==
Genus Brizopyrum:

- Brizopyrum acutiflorum Nees, accepted as Brizopyrum acutiflorum Nees var. maius Nees, present
  - Brizopyrum acutiflorum Nees var. capillaris Nees, accepted as Tribolium acutiflorum (Nees) Renvoize, present
- Brizopyrum alternans Nees, accepted as Tribolium uniolae (L.f.) Renvoize, present
- Brizopyrum capense Trin. var. brachystachyum Nees, accepted as Tribolium brachystachyum (Nees) Renvoize, present
- Brizopyrum obliterum Stapf, accepted as Tribolium obliterum (Hemsl.) Renvoize, present

== Bromus ==
Genus Bromus:

- Bromus alopecurus Poir. not indigenous, naturalised
- Bromus catharticus Vahl, not indigenous, naturalised
- Bromus commutatus Schrad. not indigenous, naturalised
- Bromus diandrus Roth, not indigenous, naturalised
- Bromus firmior (Nees) Stapf, indigenous
- Bromus hordeaceus L. not indigenous, naturalised
  - Bromus hordeaceus L. subsp. ferronii (Mabille) P.M.Sm. not indigenous, naturalised
  - Bromus hordeaceus L. subsp. molliformis (J.Lloyd) Maire & Weiller, not indigenous, naturalised
- Bromus inermis Leyss. not indigenous, naturalised
- Bromus leptoclados Nees, indigenous
- Bromus madritensis L. not indigenous, naturalised
- Bromus natalensis Stapf, indigenous
- Bromus pectinatus Thunb. indigenous
- Bromus rigidus Roth, not indigenous, naturalised
- Bromus speciosus Nees, indigenous
  - Bromus speciosus Nees var. firmior Nees, accepted as Bromus firmior (Nees) Stapf, present
- Bromus tectorum L. not indigenous, naturalised

== Calamagrostis ==
Genus Calamagrostis:

- Calamagrostis epigejos (L.) Roth, indigenous
  - Calamagrostis epigejos (L.) Roth var. capensis Stapf, indigenous

== Capeochloa ==
Genus Capeochloa:

- Capeochloa arundinacea (P.J.Bergius) N.P.Barker & H.P.Linder, indigenous
- Capeochloa cincta (Nees) N.P.Barker & H.P.Linder, indigenous
  - Capeochloa cincta (Nees) N.P.Barker & H.P.Linder subsp. cincta, indigenous
  - Capeochloa cincta (Nees) N.P.Barker & H.P.Linder subsp. sericea (N.P.Barker) N.P.Barker & H.P.Linder, indigenous
- Capeochloa setacea (N.P.Barker) N.P.Barker & H.P.Linder, indigenous

== Catalepis ==
Genus Catalepis:

- Catalepis gracilis Stapf & Stent, indigenous

== Catapodium ==
Genus Catapodium:

- Catapodium rigidum (L.) C.E.Hubb. not indigenous, naturalised

== Cenchrus ==
Genus Cenchrus:

- Cenchrus biflorus Roxb. not indigenous, naturalised
- Cenchrus brownii Roem. & Schult. not indigenous, naturalised
- Cenchrus ciliaris L. indigenous
- Cenchrus incertus M.A.Curtis, not indigenous, naturalised

== Centropodia ==
Genus Centropodia:

- Centropodia glauca (Nees) Cope, indigenous

== Chaetobromus ==
Genus Chaetobromus:

- Chaetobromus dregeanus Nees [1], accepted as Chaetobromus involucratus (Schrad.) Nees subsp. dregeanus (Nees) Verboom, present
- Chaetobromus involucratus (Schrad.) Nees, indigenous
  - Chaetobromus involucratus (Schrad.) Nees subsp. dregeanus (Nees) Verboom, endemic
  - Chaetobromus involucratus (Schrad.) Nees subsp. involucratus, endemic
  - Chaetobromus involucratus (Schrad.) Nees subsp. sericeus (Nees) Verboom, indigenous
- Chaetobromus schlechteri Pilg. accepted as Chaetobromus involucratus (Schrad.) Nees subsp. dregeanus (Nees) Verboom, present
- Chaetobromus schraderi Stapf, accepted as Chaetobromus involucratus (Schrad.) Nees subsp. involucratus, present

== Chloris ==
Genus Chloris:

- Chloris diluta Renvoize, indigenous
- Chloris gayana Kunth, indigenous
- Chloris mossambicensis K.Schum. indigenous
- Chloris nutans (Stapf) P.M.Peterson, syn. Lintonia nutans Stapf, indigenous
- Chloris pycnothrix Trin. indigenous
- Chloris roxburghiana Schult. indigenous
- Chloris truncata R.Br. not indigenous, naturalised
- Chloris virgata Sw. indigenous

== Chrysopogon ==
Genus Chrysopogon:

- Chrysopogon serrulatus Trin. indigenous

== Cladoraphis ==
Genus Cladoraphis:

- Cladoraphis cyperoides (Thunb.) S.M.Phillips, indigenous
- Cladoraphis spinosa (L.f.) S.M.Phillips, indigenous

== Cleistachne ==
Genus Cleistachne:

- Cleistachne sorghoides Benth. indigenous

== Coelachyrum ==
Genus Coelachyrum:

- Coelachyrum yemenicum (Schweinf.) S.M.Phillips, indigenous

== Coelorachis ==
Genus Coelorachis:

- Coelorachis capensis Stapf, endemic

== Coix ==
Genus Coix:

- Coix lacryma-jobi L. not indigenous, naturalised

== Colpodium ==
Genus Colpodium:

- Colpodium drakensbergense Hedberg & I.Hedberg, accepted as Catabrosa drakensbergense (Hedberg & I.Hedberg) Soreng & Fish, indigenous

== Cortaderia ==
Genus Cortaderia:

- Cortaderia jubata (Lemoine ex Carriere) Stapf, not indigenous, naturalised, invasive
- Cortaderia selloana (Schult.) Asch. & Graebn. not indigenous, naturalised, invasive

== Corynephorus ==
Genus Corynephorus:

- Corynephorus fasciculatus Boiss. & Reut. not indigenous, naturalised

== Craspedorhachis ==
Genus Craspedorhachis:

- Craspedorhachis africana Benth. indigenous

== Ctenium ==
Genus Ctenium:

- Ctenium concinnum Nees, indigenous

== Cymbopogon ==
Genus Cymbopogon:

- Cymbopogon caesius (Hook. & Arn.) Stapf, indigenous
- Cymbopogon dieterlenii Stapf ex E.Phillips, indigenous
- Cymbopogon excavatus (Hochst.) Stapf ex Burtt Davy, accepted as Cymbopogon caesius (Hook. & Arn.) Stapf, present
- Cymbopogon marginatus (Steud.) Stapf ex Burtt Davy, indigenous
- Cymbopogon nardus (L.) Rendle, indigenous
- Cymbopogon plurinodis (Stapf) Stapf ex Burtt Davy, accepted as Cymbopogon pospischilii (K.Schum.) C.E.Hubb. present
- Cymbopogon pospischilii (K.Schum.) C.E.Hubb. indigenous
- Cymbopogon prolixus (Stapf) E.Phillips, indigenous
- Cymbopogon validus (Stapf) Stapf ex Burtt Davy, accepted as Cymbopogon nardus (L.) Rendle, present

== Cynodon ==
Genus Cynodon:

- Cynodon aethiopicus Clayton & Harlan, not indigenous, naturalised, invasive
- Cynodon bradleyi Stent, endemic
- Cynodon dactylon (L.) Pers. indigenous
- Cynodon hirsutus Stent, indigenous
  - Cynodon hirsutus Stent var. hirsutus, endemic
  - Cynodon hirsutus Stent var. parviglumis Stent, indigenous
- Cynodon incompletus Nees, endemic
- Cynodon nlemfuensis Vanderyst, not indigenous, naturalised, invasive
- Cynodon polevansii Stent, endemic
- Cynodon transvaalensis Burtt Davy, indigenous

== Cynosurus ==
Genus Cynosurus:

- Cynosurus coloratus Lehm. ex Nees, not indigenous, naturalised
- Cynosurus echinatus L. not indigenous, naturalised, invasive

== Dactylis ==
Genus Dactylis:

- Dactylis glomerata L. not indigenous, naturalised, invasive

== Dactyloctenium ==
Genus Dactyloctenium:

- Dactyloctenium aegyptium (L.) Willd. indigenous
- Dactyloctenium australe Steud. indigenous
- Dactyloctenium geminatum Hack. indigenous
- Dactyloctenium giganteum Fisher & Schweick. indigenous

== Danthonia ==
Genus Danthonia:

- Danthonia angustifolia Nees, accepted as Pentameris pallida (Thunb.) H.P.Linder, present
  - Danthonia angustifolia Nees var. micrathera Nees, accepted as Pentameris glandulosa (Schrad.) Steud. present
- Danthonia densifolia Nees, accepted as Pentameris densifolia (Nees) Steud. present
- Danthonia heptamera Nees, accepted as Pentameris heptameris (Nees) Steud. present
- Danthonia holciformis Nees, accepted as Pentameris holciformis (Nees) Galley & H.P.Linder, present
- Danthonia lima Nees, accepted as Pentameris lima (Nees) Steud. present

== Danthoniopsis ==
Genus Danthoniopsis:

- Danthoniopsis dinteri (Pilg.) C.E.Hubb. indigenous
- Danthoniopsis parva (J.B.Phipps) Clayton, endemic
- Danthoniopsis pruinosa C.E.Hubb. indigenous
- Danthoniopsis ramosa (Stapf) Clayton, indigenous
- Danthoniopsis scopulorum (J.B.Phipps) J.B.Phipps, endemic

== Deschampsia ==
Genus Deschampsia:

- Deschampsia caespitosa (L.) P.Beauv. not indigenous, naturalised
- Deschampsia flexuosa (L.) Trin. not indigenous, naturalised

== Desmazeria ==
Genus Desmazeria:

- Desmazeria composita Hack. accepted as Tribolium obtusifolium (Nees) Renvoize, present

== Diandrochloa ==
Genus Diandrochloa:

- Diandrochloa namaquensis (Nees) De Winter, indigenous
- Diandrochloa pusilla (Hack.) De Winter, indigenous

== Dichanthium ==
Genus Dichanthium:

- Dichanthium annulatum (Forssk.) Stapf, indigenous
  - Dichanthium annulatum (Forssk.) Stapf var. papillosum (A.Rich.) de Wet & Harlan, indigenous
- Dichanthium aristatum (Poir.) C.E.Hubb. not indigenous, naturalised

== Digitaria ==
Genus Digitaria:

- Digitaria argyrograpta (Nees) Stapf, indigenous
- Digitaria argyrotricha (Andersson) Chiov. indigenous
- Digitaria brazzae (Franch.) Stapf, indigenous
- Digitaria ciliaris (Retz.) Koeler, not indigenous, naturalised
- Digitaria debilis (Desf.) Willd. indigenous
- Digitaria diagonalis (Nees) Stapf, indigenous
  - Digitaria diagonalis (Nees) Stapf var. diagonalis, indigenous
- Digitaria didactyla Willd. not indigenous, naturalised
- Digitaria diversinervis (Nees) Stapf, endemic
- Digitaria eriantha Steud. indigenous
- Digitaria eylesii C.E.Hubb. indigenous
- Digitaria flaccida Stapf, indigenous
- Digitaria glauca Stent var. bechuanica Stent, accepted as Digitaria eriantha Steud. present
- Digitaria gymnostachys Pilg. indigenous
- Digitaria hiascens Mez, accepted as Digitaria eriantha Steud. present
- Digitaria longiflora (Retz.) Pers. indigenous
- Digitaria maitlandii Stapf & C.E.Hubb. indigenous
- Digitaria milanjiana (Rendle) Stapf, indigenous
- Digitaria monodactyla (Nees) Stapf, indigenous
- Digitaria natalensis Stent, indigenous
- Digitaria nuda Schumach. not indigenous, naturalised
- Digitaria perrottetii (Kunth) Stapf, indigenous
- Digitaria polyphylla Henrard, indigenous
- Digitaria rukwae Clayton, indigenous
- Digitaria sanguinalis (L.) Scop. not indigenous, naturalised
- Digitaria scalarum (Schweinf.) Chiov. indigenous
- Digitaria seriata Stapf, indigenous
- Digitaria setifolia Stapf, indigenous
- Digitaria ternata (A.Rich.) Stapf, indigenous
- Digitaria thouarsiana (Flugge) A.Camus, indigenous
- Digitaria tricholaenoides Stapf, indigenous
- Digitaria velutina (Forssk.) P.Beauv. indigenous
- Digitaria violascens Link, not indigenous, naturalised

== Diheteropogon ==
Genus Diheteropogon:

- Diheteropogon amplectens (Nees) Clayton, indigenous
  - Diheteropogon amplectens (Nees) Clayton var. amplectens, indigenous
- Diheteropogon filifolius (Nees) Clayton, indigenous

== Dinebra ==
Genus Dinebra:

- Dinebra retroflexa (Vahl) Panz. indigenous
  - Dinebra retroflexa (Vahl) Panz. var. condensata S.M.Phillips, indigenous

== Diplachne ==
Genus Diplachne:

- Diplachne cuspidata Launert, accepted as Leptochloa fusca (L.) Kunth
- Diplachne eleusine Nees, accepted as Leptochloa eleusine (Nees) Cope & N.Snow, present
- Diplachne fusca (L.) P.Beauv. ex Roem. & Schult. accepted as Leptochloa fusca (L.) Kunth, present
- Diplachne gigantea Launert, accepted as Leptochloa gigantea (Launert) Cope & N.Snow
- Diplachne pallida Hack. accepted as Leptochloa fusca (L.) Kunth, present

== Dregeochloa ==
Genus Dregeochloa:

- Dregeochloa calviniensis Conert, endemic
- Dregeochloa pumila (Nees) Conert, indigenous

== Echinochloa ==
Genus Echinochloa:

- Echinochloa colona (L.) Link, indigenous
- Echinochloa crus-galli (L.) P.Beauv. indigenous
- Echinochloa crus-pavonis (Kunth) Schult. indigenous
- Echinochloa haploclada (Stapf) Stapf, indigenous
- Echinochloa holubii (Stapf) Stapf, indigenous
- Echinochloa jubata Stapf, indigenous
- Echinochloa pyramidalis (Lam.) Hitchc. & Chase, indigenous
- Echinochloa stagnina (Retz.) P.Beauv. indigenous
- Echinochloa ugandensis Snowden & C.E.Hubb. indigenous

== Ehrharta ==
Genus Ehrharta:

- Ehrharta barbinodis Nees ex Trin. endemic
- Ehrharta brachylemma Pilg. accepted as Ehrharta brevifolia Schrad. var. brevifolia, present
- Ehrharta brevifolia Schrad. indigenous
  - Ehrharta brevifolia Schrad. var. brevifolia, indigenous
  - Ehrharta brevifolia Schrad. var. cuspidata Nees, indigenous
- Ehrharta bulbosa Sm. endemic
- Ehrharta calycina Sm. indigenous
- Ehrharta capensis Thunb. endemic
- Ehrharta delicatula Stapf, indigenous
- Ehrharta dura Nees ex Trin. endemic
- Ehrharta eburnea Gibbs Russ. endemic
- Ehrharta erecta Lam. indigenous
  - Ehrharta erecta Lam. var. erecta, indigenous
  - Ehrharta erecta Lam. var. natalensis Stapf, indigenous
- Ehrharta longiflora Sm. indigenous
- Ehrharta longifolia Schrad. endemic
- Ehrharta longigluma C.E.Hubb. indigenous
- Ehrharta melicoides Thunb. endemic
- Ehrharta microlaena Nees ex Trin. endemic
- Ehrharta ottonis Kunth ex Nees, endemic
- Ehrharta pusilla Nees ex Trin. indigenous
- Ehrharta ramosa (Thunb.) Thunb. indigenous
  - Ehrharta ramosa (Thunb.) Thunb. subsp. aphylla (Schrad.) Gibbs Russ. endemic
  - Ehrharta ramosa (Thunb.) Thunb. subsp. ramosa, endemic
- Ehrharta rehmannii Stapf, indigenous
  - Ehrharta rehmannii Stapf subsp. filiformis (Stapf) Gibbs Russ. endemic
  - Ehrharta rehmannii Stapf subsp. rehmannii, endemic
  - Ehrharta rehmannii Stapf subsp. subspicata (Stapf) Gibbs Russ. endemic
- Ehrharta rupestris Nees ex Trin. indigenous
  - Ehrharta rupestris Nees ex Trin. subsp. dodii (Stapf) Gibbs Russ. endemic
  - Ehrharta rupestris Nees ex Trin. subsp. rupestris, endemic
  - Ehrharta rupestris Nees ex Trin. subsp. tricostata (Stapf) Gibbs Russ. endemic
- Ehrharta schlechteri Rendle, accepted as Ehrharta brevifolia Schrad. var. cuspidata Nees, present
- Ehrharta setacea Nees, indigenous
  - Ehrharta setacea Nees subsp. disticha (Stapf) Gibbs Russ. endemic
  - Ehrharta setacea Nees subsp. scabra (Stapf) Gibbs Russ. endemic
  - Ehrharta setacea Nees subsp. setacea, endemic
  - Ehrharta setacea Nees subsp. uniflora (Burch. ex Stapf) Gibbs Russ. endemic
- Ehrharta thunbergii Gibbs Russ. indigenous
- Ehrharta triandra Nees ex Trin. indigenous
- Ehrharta villosa Schult.f. indigenous
  - Ehrharta villosa Schult.f. var. maxima Stapf, endemic
  - Ehrharta villosa Schult.f. var. villosa, endemic

== Eleusine ==
Genus Eleusine:

- Eleusine coracana (L.) Gaertn. indigenous
  - Eleusine coracana (L.) Gaertn. subsp. africana (Kenn.-O'Byrne) Hilu & de Wet, indigenous
- Eleusine indica (L.) Gaertn. indigenous
- Eleusine multiflora A.Rich. not indigenous, naturalised
- Eleusine tristachya (Lam.) Lam. not indigenous, naturalised

== Elionurus ==
Genus Elionurus:

- Elionurus muticus (Spreng.) Kunth, indigenous

== Elymandra ==
Genus Elymandra:

- Elymandra grallata (Stapf) Clayton, indigenous

== Elymus ==
Genus Elymus:

- Elymus repens (L.) Gould (syn. Elytrigia repens (L.) Nevski), not indigenous, naturalised

== Elytrophorus ==
Genus Elytrophorus:

- Elytrophorus globularis Hack. indigenous

== Enneapogon ==
Genus Enneapogon:

- Enneapogon cenchroides (Licht. ex Roem. & Schult.) C.E.Hubb. indigenous
- Enneapogon desvauxii P.Beauv. indigenous
- Enneapogon pretoriensis Stent, indigenous
- Enneapogon scaber Lehm. indigenous
- Enneapogon scoparius Stapf, indigenous
- Enneapogon spathaceus Gooss. endemic

== Enteropogon ==
Genus Enteropogon:

- Enteropogon macrostachyus (Hochst. ex A.Rich.) Munro ex Benth. indigenous
- Enteropogon monostachyus (Vahl) K.Schum. indigenous
  - Enteropogon monostachyus (Vahl) K.Schum. subsp. africanus Clayton, indigenous
- Enteropogon muticus Hack. accepted as Rendlia altera (Rendle) Chiov. present

== Entolasia ==
Genus Entolasia:

- Entolasia olivacea Stapf, indigenous

== Eragrostis ==
Genus Eragrostis:

- Eragrostis acraea De Winter, indigenous
- Eragrostis aethiopica Chiov. indigenous
- Eragrostis amabilis (L.) Hook. & Arn. indigenous
- Eragrostis annulata Rendle ex Scott-Elliot, indigenous
- Eragrostis arenicola C.E.Hubb. indigenous
- Eragrostis aspera (Jacq.) Nees, indigenous
- Eragrostis barbinodis Hack. indigenous
- Eragrostis barrelieri Daveau, not indigenous, naturalised
- Eragrostis bergiana (Kunth) Trin. indigenous
- Eragrostis bicolor Nees, indigenous
- Eragrostis biflora Hack. ex Schinz, indigenous
- Eragrostis brizantha Nees, indigenous
- Eragrostis caesia Stapf, indigenous
- Eragrostis capensis (Thunb.) Trin. indigenous
- Eragrostis capillifolia Nees, accepted as Eragrostis curvula (Schrad.) Nees, present
- Eragrostis chapelieri (Kunth) Nees, indigenous
- Eragrostis chloromelas Steud. indigenous
- Eragrostis cilianensis (All.) Vignolo ex Janch. indigenous
- Eragrostis ciliaris (L.) R.Br. indigenous
- Eragrostis congesta Oliv. indigenous
- Eragrostis crassinervis Hack. indigenous
- Eragrostis curvula (Schrad.) Nees, indigenous
- Eragrostis cylindriflora Hochst. indigenous
- Eragrostis desolata Launert, indigenous
- Eragrostis echinochloidea Stapf, indigenous
- Eragrostis elatior Stapf, endemic
  - Eragrostis elatior Stapf var. burchellii Stapf, accepted as Eragrostis elatior Stapf, indigenous
- Eragrostis glabrata Nees, accepted as Eragrostis sabulosa (Steud.) Schweick. present
- Eragrostis glandulosipedata De Winter, indigenous
- Eragrostis gummiflua Nees, indigenous
- Eragrostis habrantha Rendle, indigenous
- Eragrostis hereroensis Hack. accepted as Eragrostis porosa Nees
- Eragrostis heteromera Stapf, indigenous
- Eragrostis hierniana Rendle, indigenous
- Eragrostis homomalla Nees, indigenous
- Eragrostis inamoena K.Schum. indigenous
- Eragrostis kingesii De Winter, indigenous
- Eragrostis lamprospicula De Winter, accepted as Eragrostis patentipilosa Hack. present
- Eragrostis lappula Nees, indigenous
- Eragrostis lehmanniana Nees, indigenous
  - Eragrostis lehmanniana Nees var. chaunantha (Pilg.) De Winter, indigenous
  - Eragrostis lehmanniana Nees var. lehmanniana, indigenous
- Eragrostis leptocalymma Pilg. accepted as Eragrostis trichophora Coss. & Durieu
- Eragrostis macrochlamys Pilg. indigenous
  - Eragrostis macrochlamys Pilg. var. macrochlamys, indigenous
  - Eragrostis macrochlamys Pilg. var. wilmaniae (C.E.Hubb. & Schweick.) De Winter, indigenous
- Eragrostis mexicana (Hornem.) Link subsp. virescens (J.Presl) S.D.Koch & Sanchez Vega, not indigenous, naturalised
- Eragrostis micrantha Hack. indigenous
- Eragrostis minor Host, not indigenous, naturalised
- Eragrostis moggii De Winter, indigenous
  - Eragrostis moggii De Winter var. moggii, indigenous
- Eragrostis nindensis Ficalho & Hiern, indigenous
- Eragrostis obtusa Munro ex Ficalho & Hiern, indigenous
- Eragrostis pallens Hack. indigenous
- Eragrostis patens Oliv. indigenous
- Eragrostis patentipilosa Hack. indigenous
- Eragrostis patentissima Hack. indigenous
- Eragrostis phyllacantha Cope, indigenous
- Eragrostis pilgeriana Dinter ex Pilg. indigenous
- Eragrostis pilosa (L.) P.Beauv. indigenous
- Eragrostis plana Nees, indigenous
- Eragrostis planiculmis Nees, indigenous
- Eragrostis porosa Nees, indigenous
- Eragrostis procumbens Nees, indigenous
- Eragrostis pseudopoa C.E.Hubb. indigenous
- Eragrostis pseudosclerantha Chiov. accepted as Eragrostis patentipilosa Hack. present
- Eragrostis pseudoteff Peter, accepted as Eragrostis lehmanniana Nees var. lehmanniana, present
- Eragrostis pusilla Hack. accepted as Diandrochloa pusilla (Hack.) De Winter
- Eragrostis racemosa (Thunb.) Steud. indigenous
- Eragrostis remotiflora De Winter, endemic
- Eragrostis rigidior Pilg. indigenous
- Eragrostis rotifer Rendle, indigenous
- Eragrostis sabulosa (Steud.) Schweick. endemic
- Eragrostis sarmentosa (Thunb.) Trin. indigenous
- Eragrostis sclerantha Nees, indigenous
  - Eragrostis sclerantha Nees subsp. sclerantha, indigenous
  - Eragrostis sclerantha Nees subsp. villosipes (Jedwabn.) Launert, indigenous
- Eragrostis stapfii De Winter, indigenous
- Eragrostis superba Peyr. indigenous
- Eragrostis tef (Zuccagni) Trotter, not indigenous, naturalised
- Eragrostis tenella (L.) Roem. & Schult. accepted as Eragrostis amabilis (L.) Hook. & Arn. present
- Eragrostis tenuifolia (A.Rich.) Steud. indigenous
- Eragrostis trichophora Coss. & Durieu, indigenous
- Eragrostis truncata Hack. indigenous
- Eragrostis virescens J.Presl, accepted as Eragrostis mexicana (Hornem.) Link subsp. virescens (J.Presl) S.D.Koch & Sanchez Vega, not indigenous, naturalised
- Eragrostis viscosa (Retz.) Trin. indigenous
- Eragrostis volkensii Pilg. indigenous
- Eragrostis x pseudobtusa De Winter, endemic

== Eriachne ==
Genus Eriachne:

- Eriachne ecklonii Nees, accepted as Pentameris bachmannii (McClean) Galley & H.P.Linder, present
- Eriachne microphylla Nees, accepted as Pentameris microphylla (Nees) Galley & H.P.Linder, present

== Eriochloa ==
Genus Eriochloa:

- Eriochloa fatmensis (Hochst. & Steud.) Clayton, indigenous
- Eriochloa meyeriana (Nees) Pilg. [1], indigenous
  - Eriochloa meyeriana (Nees) Pilg. subsp. grandiglumis (Stent & J.M.Rattray) Gibbs Russ. indigenous
  - Eriochloa meyeriana (Nees) Pilg. subsp. meyeriana, indigenous
- Eriochloa parvispiculata C.E.Hubb. indigenous
- Eriochloa stapfiana Clayton, indigenous

== Eriochrysis ==
Genus Eriochrysis:

- Eriochrysis brachypogon (Stapf) Stapf, indigenous
- Eriochrysis pallida Munro, indigenous

== Eulalia ==
Genus Eulalia:

- Eulalia aurea (Bory) Kunth, indigenous
- Eulalia villosa (Thunb.) Nees, indigenous

== Eustachys ==
Genus Eustachys:

- Eustachys paspaloides (Vahl) Lanza & Mattei, indigenous

== Festuca ==
Genus Festuca:

- Festuca africana (Hack.) Clayton, indigenous
- Festuca arundinacea Schreb. not indigenous, naturalised
- Festuca caprina Nees, indigenous
  - Festuca caprina Nees var. curvula Lehm. accepted as Festuca caprina Nees, present
- Festuca costata Nees, indigenous
- Festuca costata Nees var. fascicularis Nees, accepted as Festuca costata Nees, present
- Festuca dracomontana H.P.Linder, indigenous
- Festuca elatior L. accepted as Festuca arundinacea Schreb. not indigenous, naturalised
- Festuca killickii Kenn.-O'Byrne, endemic
- Festuca longipes Stapf, indigenous
- Festuca scabra Vahl, indigenous
- Festuca vulpioides Steud. endemic

== Fingerhuthia ==
Genus Fingerhuthia:

- Fingerhuthia africana Lehm. indigenous
- Fingerhuthia sesleriiformis Nees, indigenous

== Gastridium ==
Genus Gastridium:

- Gastridium phleoides (Nees & Meyen) C.E.Hubb. not indigenous, naturalised

== Geochloa ==
Genus Geochloa:

- Geochloa decora (Nees) N.P.Barker & H.P.Linder, endemic
- Geochloa lupulina (L.f.) N.P.Barker & H.P.Linder, endemic
- Geochloa rufa (Nees) N.P.Barker & H.P.Linder, endemic

== Glyceria ==
Genus Glyceria:

- Glyceria maxima (Hartm.) Holmb. not indigenous, naturalised, invasive

== Gymnothrix ==
Genus Gymnothrix:

- Gymnothrix uniseta Nees, accepted as Pennisetum unisetum (Nees) Benth. present

== Hackelochloa ==
Genus Hackelochloa:

- Hackelochloa granularis (L.) Kuntze, indigenous

== Hainardia ==
Genus Hainardia:

- Hainardia cylindrica (Willd.) Greuter, not indigenous, naturalised

== Harpochloa ==
Genus Harpochloa:

- Harpochloa falx (L.f.) Kuntze, indigenous

== Helictotrichon ==
Genus Helictotrichon:

- Helictotrichon barbatum (Nees) Schweick. endemic
- Helictotrichon capense Schweick. endemic
- Helictotrichon dodii (Stapf) Schweick. endemic
- Helictotrichon galpinii Schweick. indigenous
- Helictotrichon hirtulum (Steud.) Schweick. indigenous
- Helictotrichon leoninum (Steud.) Schweick. endemic
- Helictotrichon longifolium (Nees) Schweick. indigenous
- Helictotrichon longum (Stapf) Schweick. endemic
- Helictotrichon namaquense Schweick. endemic
- Helictotrichon natalense (Stapf) Schweick. endemic
- Helictotrichon quinquesetum (Steud.) Schweick. endemic
- Helictotrichon rogerellisii Mashau, Fish & A.E.van Wyk, indigenous
- Helictotrichon roggeveldense Mashau, Fish & A.E.van Wyk, indigenous
- Helictotrichon turgidulum (Stapf) Schweick. indigenous

== Hemarthria ==
Genus Hemarthria:

- Hemarthria altissima (Poir.) Stapf & C.E.Hubb. indigenous

== Heteropogon ==
Genus Heteropogon:

- Heteropogon contortus (L.) Roem. & Schult. indigenous
- Heteropogon melanocarpus (Elliott) Benth. indigenous

== Holcus ==
Genus Holcus:

- Holcus lanatus L. not indigenous, naturalised
- Holcus setiger Nees, endemic

== Hordeum ==
Genus Hordeum:

- Hordeum capense Thunb. indigenous
- Hordeum geniculatum All. not indigenous, naturalised
- Hordeum marinum Huds. subsp. gussoneanum (Parl.) Thell. accepted as Hordeum geniculatum All. not indigenous, naturalised
- Hordeum murinum L. subsp. murinum, not indigenous, naturalised
  - Hordeum murinum L. subsp. glaucum (Steud.) Tzvelev, not indigenous, naturalised
  - Hordeum murinum L. subsp. leporinum (Link) Arcang. not indigenous, naturalised
- Hordeum stenostachys Godr. not indigenous, naturalised

== Hyparrhenia ==
Genus Hyparrhenia:

- Hyparrhenia anamesa Clayton, indigenous
- Hyparrhenia collina (Pilg.) Stapf, indigenous
- Hyparrhenia cymbaria (L.) Stapf, indigenous
- Hyparrhenia dichroa (Steud.) Stapf, indigenous
- Hyparrhenia dregeana (Nees) Stapf ex Stent, indigenous
- Hyparrhenia filipendula (Hochst.) Stapf, indigenous
  - Hyparrhenia filipendula (Hochst.) Stapf var. filipendula, indigenous
  - Hyparrhenia filipendula (Hochst.) Stapf var. pilosa (Hochst.) Stapf, indigenous
- Hyparrhenia finitima (Hochst.) Andersson ex Stapf, indigenous
- Hyparrhenia gazensis (Rendle) Stapf, indigenous
- Hyparrhenia hirta (L.) Stapf, indigenous
- Hyparrhenia newtonii (Hack.) Stapf, indigenous
  - Hyparrhenia newtonii (Hack.) Stapf var. macra Stapf, indigenous
  - Hyparrhenia newtonii (Hack.) Stapf var. newtonii, indigenous
- Hyparrhenia nyassae (Rendle) Stapf, indigenous
- Hyparrhenia pilgeriana C.E.Hubb. indigenous
- Hyparrhenia poecilotricha (Hack.) Stapf, indigenous
- Hyparrhenia quarrei Robyns, indigenous
- Hyparrhenia rudis Stapf, indigenous
- Hyparrhenia rufa (Nees) Stapf, indigenous
  - Hyparrhenia rufa (Nees) Stapf var. rufa, indigenous
- Hyparrhenia schimperi (Hochst. ex A.Rich.) Andersson ex Stapf, indigenous
- Hyparrhenia tamba (Steud.) Stapf, indigenous
- Hyparrhenia umbrosa (Hochst.) Andersson ex Clayton, indigenous
- Hyparrhenia variabilis Stapf, indigenous

== Hyperthelia ==
Genus Hyperthelia:

- Hyperthelia dissoluta (Nees ex Steud.) Clayton, indigenous

== Imperata ==
Genus Imperata:

- Imperata cylindrica (L.) Raeusch. [2], indigenous

== Ischaemum ==
Genus Ischaemum:

- Ischaemum afrum (J.F.Gmel.) Dandy, indigenous
- Ischaemum fasciculatum Brongn. indigenous

== Karroochloa ==
Genus Karroochloa:

- Karroochloa curva (Nees) Conert & Turpe, accepted as Tribolium curvum (Nees) Verboom & H.P.Linder, endemic
- Karroochloa purpurea (L.f.) Conert & Turpe, accepted as Tribolium purpureum (L.f.) Verboom & H.P.Linder, indigenous
- Karroochloa schismoides (Stapf ex Conert) Conert & Turpe, accepted as Schismus schismoides (Stapf ex Conert) Verboom & H.P.Linder, indigenous
- Karroochloa tenella (Nees) Conert & Turpe, accepted as Tribolium tenellum (Nees) Verboom & H.P.Linder, endemic

== Koeleria ==
Genus Koeleria:

- Koeleria capensis (Steud.) Nees, indigenous

== Lagurus ==
Genus Lagurus:

- Lagurus ovatus L. not indigenous, naturalised

== Lamarckia ==
Genus Lamarckia:

- Lamarckia aurea (L.) Moench, not indigenous, naturalised

== Lasiagrostis ==
Genus Lasiagrostis:

- Lasiagrostis capensis Nees, accepted as Stipa dregeana Steud. var. dregeana, present
- Lasiagrostis elongata Nees, accepted as Stipa dregeana Steud. var. dregeana, present

== Lasiochloa ==
Genus Lasiochloa:

- Lasiochloa alopecuroides Hack. accepted as Stiburus alopecuroides (Hack.) Stapf, present
- Lasiochloa longifolia (Schrad.) Kunth var. pallens Stapf, accepted as Tribolium hispidum (Thunb.) Desv. present

== Leersia ==
Genus Leersia:

- Leersia denudata Launert, indigenous
- Leersia hexandra Sw. indigenous

== Leptocarydion ==
Genus Leptocarydion:

- Leptocarydion vulpiastrum (De Not.) Stapf, indigenous

== Leptochloa ==
Genus Leptochloa:

- Leptochloa chinensis (L.) Nees, indigenous
- Leptochloa eleusine (Nees) Cope & N.Snow, indigenous
- Leptochloa fusca (L.) Kunth, indigenous
- Leptochloa panicea (Retz.) Ohwi, indigenous
- Leptochloa uniflora Hochst. ex A.Rich. indigenous

== Lepturus ==
Genus Lepturus:

- Lepturus repens (G.Forst.) R.Br. indigenous

== Leucophrys ==
Genus Leucophrys:

- Leucophrys mesocoma (Nees) Rendle, indigenous

== Lolium ==
Genus Lolium:

- Lolium multiflorum Lam. not indigenous, naturalised, invasive
- Lolium perenne L. not indigenous, naturalised
- Lolium rigidum Gaudin, not indigenous, naturalised
- Lolium temulentum L. not indigenous, naturalised

== Lophacme ==
Genus Lophacme:

- Lophacme digitata Stapf, indigenous

== Lophochloa ==
Genus Lophochloa:

- Lophochloa cristata (L.) Hyl. not indigenous, naturalised
- Lophochloa pumila (Desf.) Bor, not indigenous, naturalised

== Loudetia ==
Genus Loudetia:

- Loudetia densispica (Rendle) C.E.Hubb. indigenous
- Loudetia filifolia Schweick. indigenous
- Loudetia flavida (Stapf) C.E.Hubb. indigenous
- Loudetia pedicellata (Stent) Chippind. endemic
- Loudetia simplex (Nees) C.E.Hubb. indigenous

== Maltebrunia ==
Genus Maltebrunia:

- Maltebrunia prehensilis Nees, accepted as Prosphytochloa prehensilis (Nees) Schweick. present

== Megaloprotachne ==
Genus Megaloprotachne:

- Megaloprotachne albescens C.E.Hubb. indigenous

== Megastachya ==
Genus Megastachya:

- Megastachya mucronata (Poir.) P.Beauv. indigenous

== Melica ==
Genus Melica:

- Melica decumbens Thunb. indigenous
- Melica dendroides Lehm. accepted as Melica decumbens Thunb. present
- Melica racemosa Thunb. indigenous

== Melinis ==
Genus Melinis:

- Melinis affinis Mez, accepted as Melinis repens (Willd.) Zizka subsp. grandiflora (Hochst.) Zizka
- Melinis bachmannii Mez, accepted as Melinis nerviglumis (Franch.) Zizka, present
- Melinis bertlingii Mez, accepted as Melinis repens (Willd.) Zizka subsp. grandiflora (Hochst.) Zizka
- Melinis drakensbergensis (C.E.Hubb. & Schweick.) Clayton, endemic
- Melinis ejubata Mez, accepted as Melinis repens (Willd.) Zizka subsp. grandiflora (Hochst.) Zizka
- Melinis longiseta (A.Rich.) Zizka, indigenous
  - Melinis longiseta (A.Rich.) Zizka subsp. bellespicata (Rendle) Zizka, indigenous
- Melinis macrochaeta Stapf & C.E.Hubb. indigenous
- Melinis minutiflora P.Beauv. indigenous
- Melinis mutica Mez, accepted as Melinis repens (Willd.) Zizka subsp. grandiflora (Hochst.) Zizka
- Melinis nerviglumis (Franch.) Zizka, indigenous
- Melinis otaviensis Mez, accepted as Melinis repens (Willd.) Zizka subsp. grandiflora (Hochst.) Zizka
- Melinis pulchra Mez, accepted as Melinis repens (Willd.) Zizka subsp. grandiflora (Hochst.) Zizka
- Melinis rangei Mez, accepted as Melinis repens (Willd.) Zizka subsp. grandiflora (Hochst.) Zizka
- Melinis repens (Willd.) Zizka, indigenous
  - Melinis repens (Willd.) Zizka subsp. grandiflora (Hochst.) Zizka, indigenous
  - Melinis repens (Willd.) Zizka subsp. repens, indigenous
- Melinis scabrida (K.Schum.) Hack. indigenous
- Melinis secunda Mez, accepted as Melinis longiseta (A.Rich.) Zizka subsp. bellespicata (Rendle) Zizka
- Melinis seineri Mez, accepted as Melinis repens (Willd.) Zizka subsp. grandiflora (Hochst.) Zizka
- Melinis subglabra Mez, indigenous
- Melinis tenuissima Stapf, indigenous
- Melinis trichotoma Mez, accepted as Tricholaena monachne (Trin.) Stapf & C.E.Hubb.

== Merxmuellera ==
Genus Merxmuellera:

- Merxmuellera arundinacea (P.J.Bergius) Conert [2], accepted as Capeochloa arundinacea (P.J.Bergius) N.P.Barker & H.P.Linder, endemic
- Merxmuellera aureocephala (J.G.Anderson) Conert, accepted as Tenaxia aureocephala (J.G.Anderson) N.P.Barker & H.P.Linder, endemic
- Merxmuellera cincta (Nees) Conert subsp. cincta, accepted as Capeochloa cincta (Nees) N.P.Barker & H.P.Linder subsp. cincta, endemic
  - Merxmuellera cincta (Nees) Conert subsp. sericea N.P.Barker, accepted as Capeochloa cincta (Nees) N.P.Barker & H.P.Linder subsp. sericea (N.P.Barker) N.P.Barker & H.P.Linder, endemic
- Merxmuellera davyi (C.E.Hubb.) Conert, indigenous
- Merxmuellera decora (Nees) Conert, accepted as Geochloa decora (Nees) N.P.Barker & H.P.Linder, endemic
- Merxmuellera disticha (Nees) Conert, accepted as Tenaxia disticha (Nees) N.P.Barker & H.P.Linder, indigenous
- Merxmuellera drakensbergensis (Schweick.) Conert, indigenous
- Merxmuellera dura (Stapf) Conert, accepted as Tenaxia dura (Stapf) N.P.Barker & H.P.Linder, endemic
- Merxmuellera guillarmodiae Conert, accepted as Tenaxia guillarmodiae (Conert) N.P.Barker & H.P.Linder, indigenous
- Merxmuellera lupulina (Thunb.) Conert, accepted as Geochloa lupulina (L.f.) N.P.Barker & H.P.Linder, endemic
- Merxmuellera macowanii (Stapf) Conert, indigenous
- Merxmuellera papposa (Nees) Conert, accepted as Ellisochloa papposa (Nees) P.M.Peterson & N.P.Barker, endemic
- Merxmuellera rangei (Pilg.) Conert, accepted as Ellisochloa rangei (Pilg.) P.M.Peterson & N.P.Barker
- Merxmuellera rufa (Nees) Conert, accepted as Geochloa rufa (Nees) N.P.Barker & H.P.Linder, endemic
- Merxmuellera setacea N.P.Barker, accepted as Capeochloa setacea (N.P.Barker) N.P.Barker & H.P.Linder, endemic
- Merxmuellera stereophylla (J.G.Anderson) Conert, indigenous
- Merxmuellera stricta (Schrad.) Conert, accepted as Tenaxia stricta (Schrad.) N.P.Barker & H.P.Linder, indigenous

== Microchloa ==
Genus Microchloa:

- Microchloa altera (Rendle) Stapf var. nelsonii Stapf, accepted as Rendlia altera (Rendle) Chiov.
- Microchloa caffra Nees, indigenous
- Microchloa kunthii Desv. indigenous

== Microlaena ==
Genus Microlaena:

- Microlaena stipoides (Labill.) R.Br. not indigenous, naturalised

== Microstegium ==
Genus Microstegium:

- Microstegium nudum (Trin.) A.Camus, indigenous

== Miscanthus ==
Genus Miscanthus:

- Miscanthus capensis (Nees) Andersson, accepted as Miscanthus ecklonii (Nees) Mabb. indigenous
- Miscanthus junceus (Stapf) Pilg. indigenous

== Monocymbium ==
Genus Monocymbium:

- Monocymbium ceresiiforme (Nees) Stapf, indigenous

== Mosdenia ==
Genus Mosdenia:

- Mosdenia leptostachys (Ficalho & Hiern) Clayton, endemic

== Nassella ==
Genus Nassella:

- Nassella neesiana (Trin. & Rupr.) Barkworth, not indigenous, naturalised
- Nassella tenuissima (Trin.) Barkworth, not indigenous, naturalised, invasive
- Nassella trichotoma (Nees) Hack. ex Arechav. not indigenous, naturalised, invasive

== Nastus ==
Genus Nastus:

- Nastus tessellata Nees, accepted as Thamnocalamus tessellatus (Nees) Soderstr. & R.P.Ellis, present

== Odontelytrum ==
Genus Odontelytrum:

- Odontelytrum abyssinicum Hack. indigenous

== Odyssea ==
Genus Odyssea:

- Odyssea paucinervis (Nees) Stapf, indigenous

== Olyra ==
Genus Olyra:

- Olyra latifolia L. not indigenous, naturalised

== Oplismenus ==
Genus Oplismenus:

- Oplismenus burmannii (Retz.) P.Beauv. indigenous
- Oplismenus hirtellus (L.) P.Beauv. indigenous
- Oplismenus undulatifolius (Ard.) Roem. & Schult. indigenous

== Oropetium ==
Genus Oropetium:

- Oropetium capense Stapf, indigenous

== Oryza ==
Genus Oryza:

- Oryza longistaminata A.Chev. & Roehr. indigenous
- Oryza punctata Kotschy ex Steud. indigenous

== Oxyrhachis ==
Genus Oxyrhachis:

- Oxyrhachis gracillima (Baker) C.E.Hubb. indigenous

== Oxytenanthera ==
Genus Oxytenanthera:

- Oxytenanthera abyssinica (A.Rich.) Munro, indigenous

== Panicum ==
Genus Panicum:

- Panicum aequinerve Nees, indigenous
- Panicum arbusculum Mez, indigenous
- Panicum arcurameum Stapf, indigenous
- Panicum bechuanense Bremek. & Oberm. indigenous
- Panicum coloratum L. indigenous
- Panicum deustum Thunb. indigenous
- Panicum dewinteri J.G.Anderson, endemic
- Panicum dregeanum Nees, indigenous
- Panicum ecklonii Nees, indigenous
- Panicum fluviicola Steud. indigenous
- Panicum genuflexum Stapf, indigenous
- Panicum gilvum Launert, indigenous
- Panicum glandulopaniculatum Renvoize, indigenous
- Panicum heterostachyum Hack. indigenous
- Panicum hians Elliott, accepted as Steinchisma hians (Elliott) Nash & Small, not indigenous, naturalised
- Panicum hygrocharis Steud. indigenous
- Panicum hymeniochilum Nees, indigenous
- Panicum impeditum Launert, indigenous
- Panicum infestum Peters, indigenous
- Panicum kalaharense Mez, indigenous
- Panicum lanipes Mez, indigenous
- Panicum laticomum Nees, indigenous
- Panicum maximum Jacq. indigenous
- Panicum miliaceum L. not indigenous, naturalised
- Panicum monticola Hook.f. indigenous
- Panicum natalense Hochst. indigenous
- Panicum novemnerve Stapf, indigenous
- Panicum parvifolium Lam. indigenous
- Panicum repens L. indigenous
- Panicum repentellum Napper, accepted as Panicum hygrocharis Steud. indigenous
- Panicum sancta-luciense Fish, endemic
- Panicum schinzii Hack. indigenous
- Panicum setinsigne Mez, accepted as Melinis repens (Willd.) Zizka subsp. grandiflora (Hochst.) Zizka, present
- Panicum silvestre Fish, endemic
- Panicum stapfianum Fourc. indigenous
- Panicum subalbidum Kunth, indigenous
- Panicum subflabellatum Stapf, indigenous
- Panicum volutans J.G.Anderson, endemic

== Parapholis ==
Genus Parapholis:

- Parapholis incurva (L.) C.E.Hubb. not indigenous, naturalised

== Paspalum ==
Genus Paspalum:

- Paspalum dilatatum Poir. not indigenous, naturalised
- Paspalum distichum L. indigenous
- Paspalum notatum Flugge, not indigenous, naturalised
- Paspalum quadrifarium Lam. not indigenous, naturalised, invasive
- Paspalum scrobiculatum L. indigenous
- Paspalum urvillei Steud. not indigenous, naturalised
- Paspalum vaginatum Sw. indigenous

== Pennisetum ==
Genus Pennisetum:

- Pennisetum clandestinum Hochst. ex Chiov. not indigenous, naturalised, invasive
- Pennisetum glaucocladum Stapf & C.E.Hubb. indigenous
- Pennisetum glaucum (L.) R.Br. not indigenous, naturalised
- Pennisetum macrourum Trin. indigenous
- Pennisetum mezianum Leeke, indigenous
- Pennisetum natalense Stapf, indigenous
- Pennisetum purpureum Schumach. not indigenous, naturalised, invasive
- Pennisetum setaceum (Forssk.) Chiov. not indigenous, naturalised, invasive
- Pennisetum sphacelatum (Nees) T.Durand & Schinz, indigenous
- Pennisetum tenuifolium Hack. accepted as Pennisetum sphacelatum (Nees) T.Durand & Schinz, present
- Pennisetum thunbergii Kunth, indigenous
- Pennisetum unisetum (Nees) Benth. indigenous
- Pennisetum villosum R.Br. ex Fresen. not indigenous, naturalised, invasive

== Pentameris ==
Genus Pentameris:

- Pentameris acinosa (Stapf) Galley & H.P.Linder, indigenous
- Pentameris airoides Nees, indigenous
  - Pentameris airoides Nees subsp. airoides, indigenous
  - Pentameris airoides Nees subsp. jugorum (Stapf) Galley & H.P.Linder, indigenous
- Pentameris alticola (H.P.Linder) Galley & H.P.Linder, indigenous
- Pentameris ampla (Nees) Galley & H.P.Linder, indigenous
- Pentameris argentea (Stapf) Galley & H.P.Linder, indigenous
- Pentameris aristidoides (Thunb.) Galley & H.P.Linder, indigenous
- Pentameris aristifolia (Schweick.) Galley & H.P.Linder, indigenous
- Pentameris aspera (Thunb.) Galley & H.P.Linder, indigenous
- Pentameris aurea (Steud.) Galley & H.P.Linder, indigenous
  - Pentameris aurea (Steud.) Galley & H.P.Linder subsp. aurea, indigenous
  - Pentameris aurea (Steud.) Galley & H.P.Linder subsp. pilosogluma (McClean) Galley & H.P.Linder, indigenous
- Pentameris bachmannii (McClean) Galley & H.P.Linder, indigenous
- Pentameris barbata (Nees) Steud. indigenous
  - Pentameris barbata (Nees) Steud. subsp. barbata, indigenous
  - Pentameris barbata (Nees) Steud. subsp. orientalis (H.P.Linder) Galley & H.P.Linder, indigenous
- Pentameris basutorum (Stapf) Galley & H.P.Linder, indigenous
- Pentameris calcicola (H.P.Linder) Galley & H.P.Linder, indigenous
  - Pentameris calcicola (H.P.Linder) Galley & H.P.Linder var. calcicola, indigenous
  - Pentameris calcicola (H.P.Linder) Galley & H.P.Linder var. hirsuta (H.P.Linder) Galley & H.P.Linder, indigenous
- Pentameris capensis (Nees) Galley & H.P.Linder, indigenous
- Pentameris capillaris (Thunb.) Galley & H.P.Linder, indigenous
- Pentameris caulescens (H.P.Linder) Galley & H.P.Linder, indigenous
- Pentameris chippindalliae (H.P.Linder) Galley & H.P.Linder, indigenous
- Pentameris cirrhulosa (Nees) Steud. indigenous
- Pentameris clavata (Galley) Galley & H.P.Linder, indigenous
- Pentameris colorata (Steud.) Galley & H.P.Linder, indigenous
- Pentameris curvifolia (Schrad.) Nees, indigenous
- Pentameris densifolia (Nees) Steud. indigenous
- Pentameris dentata (L.f.) Galley & H.P.Linder, indigenous
- Pentameris distichophylla (Lehm.) Nees, endemic
- Pentameris ecklonii (Nees) Galley & H.P.Linder, indigenous
- Pentameris elegans (Nees) Steud. indigenous
- Pentameris ellisii H.P.Linder, indigenous
- Pentameris eriostoma (Nees) Steud. indigenous
- Pentameris exserta (H.P.Linder) Galley & H.P.Linder, indigenous
- Pentameris galpinii (Stapf) Galley & H.P.Linder, indigenous
- Pentameris glacialis N.P.Barker, endemic
- Pentameris glandulosa (Schrad.) Steud. indigenous
- Pentameris heptameris (Nees) Steud. indigenous
- Pentameris hirtiglumis N.P.Barker, endemic
- Pentameris holciformis (Nees) Galley & H.P.Linder, indigenous
- Pentameris horrida (Galley) Galley & H.P.Linder, indigenous
- Pentameris juncifolia (Stapf) Galley & H.P.Linder, endemic
- Pentameris lima (Nees) Steud. indigenous
- Pentameris longiglumis (Nees) Steud. indigenous
  - Pentameris longiglumis (Nees) Steud. subsp. gymnocolea N.P.Barker, endemic
  - Pentameris longiglumis (Nees) Steud. subsp. longiglumis, endemic
- Pentameris longipes (Stapf) Galley & H.P.Linder, indigenous
- Pentameris macrocalycina (Steud.) Schweick. endemic
- Pentameris malouinensis (Steud.) Galley & H.P.Linder, indigenous
- Pentameris microphylla (Nees) Galley & H.P.Linder, indigenous
- Pentameris montana (H.P.Linder) Galley & H.P.Linder, indigenous
- Pentameris natalensis (Stapf) Galley & H.P.Linder, indigenous
- Pentameris obtusifolia (Hochst.) Schweick. endemic
- Pentameris oreodoxa (Schweick.) Galley & H.P.Linder, indigenous
- Pentameris oreophila N.P.Barker, endemic
- Pentameris pallescens (Schrad.) Nees, indigenous
- Pentameris pallida (Thunb.) Galley & H.P.Linder, indigenous
- Pentameris patula (Nees) Steud. indigenous
- Pentameris pholiuroides (Stapf) Galley & H.P.Linder, indigenous
- Pentameris praecox (H.P.Linder) Galley & H.P.Linder, indigenous
- Pentameris pseudopallescens (H.P.Linder) Galley & H.P.Linder, indigenous
- Pentameris pungens (H.P.Linder) Galley & H.P.Linder, indigenous
- Pentameris pusilla (Nees) Galley & H.P.Linder, indigenous
- Pentameris pyrophila (H.P.Linder) Galley & H.P.Linder, indigenous
- Pentameris reflexa (H.P.Linder) Galley & H.P.Linder, indigenous
- Pentameris rigidissima (Pilg. ex H.P.Linder) Galley & H.P.Linder, indigenous
- Pentameris rosea (H.P.Linder) Galley & H.P.Linder, indigenous
  - Pentameris rosea (H.P.Linder) Galley & H.P.Linder subsp. purpurascens (H.P.Linder) Galley & H.P.Lind, indigenous
  - Pentameris rosea (H.P.Linder) Galley & H.P.Linder subsp. rosea, indigenous
- Pentameris rupestris (Nees) Steud. indigenous
- Pentameris scabra (Nees) Steud. indigenous
- Pentameris scandens (H.P.Linder) Galley & H.P.Linder, indigenous
- Pentameris setifolia (Thunb.) Galley & H.P.Linder, indigenous
- Pentameris swartbergensis N.P.Barker, endemic
- Pentameris thuarii P.Beauv. endemic
- Pentameris tomentella (Stapf) Galley & H.P.Linder, indigenous
- Pentameris tortuosa (Trin.) Nees, indigenous
- Pentameris trifida (Galley) Galley & H.P.Linder, indigenous
- Pentameris triseta (Thunb.) Galley & H.P.Linder, indigenous
- Pentameris tysonii (Stapf) Galley & H.P.Linder, indigenous
- Pentameris uniflora N.P.Barker, endemic
- Pentameris velutina (H.P.Linder) Galley & H.P.Linder, indigenous
- Pentameris veneta (H.P.Linder) Galley & H.P.Linder, indigenous
- Pentameris viscidula (Nees) Steud. indigenous

== Pentaschistis ==
Genus Pentaschistis (now included in Pentameris)

- Pentaschistis acinosa Stapf, accepted as Pentameris acinosa (Stapf) Galley & H.P.Linder, endemic
- Pentaschistis airoides (Nees) Stapf subsp. airoides, accepted as Pentameris airoides Nees subsp. airoides, indigenous
  - Pentaschistis airoides (Nees) Stapf subsp. jugorum (Stapf) H.P.Linder, accepted as Pentameris airoides Nees subsp. jugorum (Stapf) Galley & H.P.Linder, indigenous
- Pentaschistis alticola H.P.Linder, accepted as Pentameris alticola (H.P.Linder) Galley & H.P.Linder, endemic
- Pentaschistis ampla (Nees) McClean, accepted as Pentameris ampla (Nees) Galley & H.P.Linder, endemic
- Pentaschistis argentea Stapf, accepted as Pentameris argentea (Stapf) Galley & H.P.Linder, endemic
- Pentaschistis aristidoides (Thunb.) Stapf, accepted as Pentameris aristidoides (Thunb.) Galley & H.P.Linder, endemic
- Pentaschistis aristifolia Schweick. accepted as Pentameris aristifolia (Schweick.) Galley & H.P.Linder, endemic
- Pentaschistis aspera (Thunb.) Stapf, accepted as Pentameris aspera (Thunb.) Galley & H.P.Linder, endemic
- Pentaschistis aurea (Steud.) McClean, indigenous
  - Pentaschistis aurea (Steud.) McClean subsp. aurea, accepted as Pentameris aurea (Steud.) Galley & H.P.Linder subsp. aurea, endemic
  - Pentaschistis aurea (Steud.) McClean subsp. pilosogluma (McClean) H.P.Linder, indigenous
- Pentaschistis barbata (Nees) H.P.Linder subsp. barbata, accepted as Pentameris barbata (Nees) Steud. subsp. barbata, endemic
  - Pentaschistis barbata (Nees) H.P.Linder subsp. orientalis H.P.Linder, accepted as Pentameris barbata (Nees) Steud. subsp. orientalis (H.P.Linder) Galley & H.P.Linder, endemic
- Pentaschistis basutorum Stapf, accepted as Pentameris basutorum (Stapf) Galley & H.P.Linder, indigenous
- Pentaschistis calcicola H.P.Linder var. calcicola, accepted as Pentameris calcicola (H.P.Linder) Galley & H.P.Linder var. calcicola, endemic
  - Pentaschistis calcicola H.P.Linder var. hirsuta H.P.Linder, accepted as Pentameris calcicola (H.P.Linder) Galley & H.P.Linder var. hirsuta (H.P.Linder) Galley & H.P.Linder, endemic
- Pentaschistis capensis (Nees) Stapf, accepted as Pentameris capensis (Nees) Galley & H.P.Linder, endemic
- Pentaschistis capillaris (Thunb.) McClean, accepted as Pentameris capillaris (Thunb.) Galley & H.P.Linder, endemic
- Pentaschistis caulescens H.P.Linder, accepted as Pentameris caulescens (H.P.Linder) Galley & H.P.Linder, endemic
- Pentaschistis chippindalliae H.P.Linder, accepted as Pentameris chippindalliae (H.P.Linder) Galley & H.P.Linder, endemic
- Pentaschistis cirrhulosa (Nees) H.P.Linder, accepted as Pentameris cirrhulosa (Nees) Steud. endemic
- Pentaschistis clavata Galley, accepted as Pentameris clavata (Galley) Galley & H.P.Linder, present
- Pentaschistis colorata (Steud.) Stapf, accepted as Pentameris colorata (Steud.) Galley & H.P.Linder, endemic
- Pentaschistis curvifolia (Schrad.) Stapf, accepted as Pentameris curvifolia (Schrad.) Nees, endemic
- Pentaschistis densifolia (Nees) Stapf, accepted as Pentameris densifolia (Nees) Steud. endemic
- Pentaschistis ecklonii (Nees) McClean, accepted as Pentameris bachmannii (McClean) Galley & H.P.Linder, endemic
- Pentaschistis elegans (Nees) Stapf, accepted as Pentameris elegans (Nees) Steud. endemic
- Pentaschistis eriostoma (Nees) Stapf, accepted as Pentameris eriostoma (Nees) Steud. endemic
- Pentaschistis exserta H.P.Linder, accepted as Pentameris exserta (H.P.Linder) Galley & H.P.Linder, indigenous
- Pentaschistis galpinii (Stapf) McClean, accepted as Pentameris galpinii (Stapf) Galley & H.P.Linder, indigenous
- Pentaschistis glandulosa (Schrad.) H.P.Linder, accepted as Pentameris glandulosa (Schrad.) Steud. endemic
- Pentaschistis heptamera (Nees) Stapf, accepted as Pentameris heptameris (Nees) Steud. endemic
- Pentaschistis holciformis (Nees) H.P.Linder, accepted as Pentameris holciformis (Nees) Galley & H.P.Linder, endemic
- Pentaschistis horrida Galley, accepted as Pentameris horrida (Galley) Galley & H.P.Linder, present
- Pentaschistis juncifolia Stapf, accepted as Pentameris juncifolia (Stapf) Galley & H.P.Linder, present
- Pentaschistis lima (Nees) Stapf, accepted as Pentameris lima (Nees) Steud. endemic
- Pentaschistis longipes Stapf, accepted as Pentameris longipes (Stapf) Galley & H.P.Linder, endemic
- Pentaschistis malouinensis (Steud.) Clayton, accepted as Pentameris malouinensis (Steud.) Galley & H.P.Linder, endemic
- Pentaschistis microphylla (Nees) McClean, accepted as Pentameris microphylla (Nees) Galley & H.P.Linder, endemic
- Pentaschistis montana H.P.Linder, accepted as Pentameris montana (H.P.Linder) Galley & H.P.Linder, endemic
- Pentaschistis natalensis Stapf, accepted as Pentameris natalensis (Stapf) Galley & H.P.Linder, indigenous
- Pentaschistis oreodoxa Schweick. accepted as Pentameris oreodoxa (Schweick.) Galley & H.P.Linder, indigenous
- Pentaschistis pallescens (Schrad.) Stapf accepted as Pentameris pallescens, endemic
- Pentaschistis pallida (Thunb.) H.P.Linder accepted as Pentameris pallida, endemic
- Pentaschistis papillosa (Steud.) H.P.Linder, accepted as Pentameris scabra (Nees) Steud. endemic
- Pentaschistis patula (Nees) Stapf, accepted as Pentameris patula (Nees) Steud. endemic
- Pentaschistis praecox H.P.Linder, accepted as Pentameris praecox (H.P.Linder) Galley & H.P.Linder
- Pentaschistis pseudopallescens H.P.Linder, accepted as Pentameris pseudopallescens (H.P.Linder) Galley & H.P.Linder, endemic
- Pentaschistis pungens H.P.Linder, accepted as Pentameris pungens (H.P.Linder) Galley & H.P.Linder, endemic
- Pentaschistis pusilla (Nees) H.P.Linder, accepted as Pentameris pusilla (Nees) Galley & H.P.Linder, endemic
- Pentaschistis pyrophila H.P.Linder, accepted as Pentameris pyrophila (H.P.Linder) Galley & H.P.Linder, endemic
- Pentaschistis reflexa H.P.Linder, accepted as Pentameris reflexa (H.P.Linder) Galley & H.P.Linder, endemic
- Pentaschistis rigidissima Pilg. ex H.P.Linder, accepted as Pentameris rigidissima (Pilg. ex H.P.Linder) Galley & H.P.Linder, endemic
- Pentaschistis rosea H.P.Linder subsp. purpurascens H.P.Linder, accepted as Pentameris rosea (H.P.Linder) Galley & H.P.Linder subsp. purpurascens (H.P.Linder) Galley & H.P.Lind, endemic
- Pentaschistis rosea H.P.Linder subsp. rosea, accepted as Pentameris rosea (H.P.Linder) Galley & H.P.Linder subsp. rosea, endemic
- Pentaschistis rupestris (Nees) Stapf, accepted as Pentameris rupestris (Nees) Steud. endemic
- Pentaschistis scandens H.P.Linder, accepted as Pentameris scandens (H.P.Linder) Galley & H.P.Linder, endemic
- Pentaschistis setifolia (Thunb.) McClean, accepted as Pentameris setifolia (Thunb.) Galley & H.P.Linder, indigenous
- Pentaschistis tomentella Stapf, accepted as Pentameris tomentella (Stapf) Galley & H.P.Linder, endemic
- Pentaschistis tortuosa (Trin.) Stapf, accepted as Pentameris tortuosa (Trin.) Nees, endemic
- Pentaschistis trifida Galley, accepted as Pentameris trifida (Galley) Galley & H.P.Linder, present
- Pentaschistis triseta (Thunb.) Stapf, accepted as Pentameris triseta (Thunb.) Galley & H.P.Linder, endemic
- Pentaschistis tysonii Stapf, accepted as Pentameris tysonii (Stapf) Galley & H.P.Linder, endemic
- Pentaschistis velutina H.P.Linder, accepted as Pentameris velutina (H.P.Linder) Galley & H.P.Linder, endemic
- Pentaschistis veneta H.P.Linder, accepted as Pentameris veneta (H.P.Linder) Galley & H.P.Linder, endemic
- Pentaschistis viscidula (Nees) Stapf, accepted as Pentameris viscidula (Nees) Steud., endemic

== Periballia ==
Genus Periballia:

- Periballia minuta (L.) Asch. & Graebn. not indigenous, naturalised

== Perotis ==
Genus Perotis:

- Perotis patens Gand. indigenous

== Petrina ==
Genus Petrina:

- Petrina parva J.B.Phipps, accepted as Danthoniopsis parva (J.B.Phipps) Clayton, present

== Phacelurus ==
Genus Phacelurus:

- Phacelurus franksiae (J.M.Wood) Clayton, indigenous

== Phalaris ==
Genus Phalaris:

- Phalaris angusta Nees ex Trin. not indigenous, naturalised
- Phalaris aquatica L. not indigenous, naturalised
- Phalaris arundinacea L. not indigenous, naturalised
- Phalaris canariensis L. not indigenous, naturalised
- Phalaris minor Retz. not indigenous, naturalised
- Phalaris paradoxa L. not indigenous, naturalised

== Phragmites ==
Genus Phragmites:

- Phragmites australis (Cav.) Steud. indigenous
- Phragmites mauritianus Kunth, indigenous

== Poa ==
Genus Poa:

- Poa annua L. not indigenous, naturalised
- Poa binata Nees, indigenous
- Poa bulbosa L. indigenous
- Poa heterogama Hack. accepted as Poa binata Nees, present
- Poa leptoclada Hochst. ex A.Rich. indigenous
- Poa pratensis L. not indigenous, naturalised, invasive
- Poa trivialis L. not indigenous, naturalised

== Pogonarthria ==
Genus Pogonarthria:

- Pogonarthria squarrosa (Roem. & Schult.) Pilg. indigenous

== Polevansia ==
Genus Polevansia:

- Polevansia rigida De Winter, indigenous

== Polypogon ==
Genus Polypogon:

- Polypogon monspeliensis (L.) Desf. not indigenous, naturalised
- Polypogon strictus Nees, endemic
- Polypogon viridis (Gouan) Breistr. not indigenous, naturalised

== Prionanthium ==
Genus Prionanthium:

- Prionanthium dentatum (L.f.) Henrard, accepted as Pentameris dentata (L.f.) Galley & H.P.Linder, endemic
- Prionanthium ecklonii (Nees) Stapf, accepted as Pentameris ecklonii (Nees) Galley & H.P.Linder, endemic
- Prionanthium pholiuroides Stapf, accepted as Pentameris pholiuroides (Stapf) Galley & H.P.Linder, endemic

== Prosphytochloa ==
Genus Prosphytochloa:

- Prosphytochloa prehensilis (Nees) Schweick. indigenous

== Pseudechinolaena ==
Genus Pseudechinolaena:

- Pseudechinolaena polystachya (Kunth) Stapf, indigenous
- Pseudopentameris brachyphylla (Stapf) Conert, endemic
- Pseudopentameris caespitosa N.P.Barker, endemic
- Pseudopentameris macrantha (Schrad.) Conert, endemic
- Pseudopentameris obtusifolia (Hochst.) N.P.Barker, accepted as Pentameris obtusifolia (Hochst.) Schweick. endemic

== Puccinellia ==
Genus Puccinellia:

- Puccinellia acroxantha C.A.Sm. & C.E.Hubb. indigenous
- Puccinellia angusta (Nees) C.A.Sm. & C.E.Hubb. endemic
- Puccinellia distans (L.) Parl. not indigenous, naturalised
- Puccinellia fasciculata (Torr.) E.P.Bicknell, not indigenous, naturalised

== Rendlia ==
Genus Rendlia:

- Rendlia altera (Rendle) Chiov. indigenous

== Rhytachne ==
Genus Rhytachne:

- Rhytachne latifolia Clayton, indigenous
- Rhytachne rottboellioides Desv. indigenous

== Rottboellia ==
Genus Rottboellia:

- Rottboellia cochinchinensis (Lour.) Clayton, indigenous

== Sacciolepis ==
Genus Sacciolepis:

- Sacciolepis africana C.E.Hubb. & Snowden, indigenous
- Sacciolepis chevalieri Stapf, indigenous
- Sacciolepis curvata (L.) Chase, indigenous
- Sacciolepis indica (L.) Chase, indigenous
- Sacciolepis spiciformis (A.Rich.) Stapf, indigenous
- Sacciolepis typhura (Stapf) Stapf, indigenous

== Sartidia ==
Genus Sartidia:

- Sartidia dewinteri Munday & Fish, indigenous
- Sartidia jucunda (Schweick.) De Winter, endemic

== Sasa ==
Genus Sasa:

- Sasa ramosa Makino & Shibata, not indigenous, naturalised, invasive

== Schismus ==
Genus Schismus:

- Schismus barbatus (Loefl. ex L.) Thell. indigenous
- Schismus inermis (Stapf) C.E.Hubb. endemic
- Schismus pleuropogon Stapf, accepted as Tribolium curvum (Nees) Verboom & H.P.Linder, endemic
- Schismus scaberrimus Nees, endemic
- Schismus schismoides (Stapf ex Conert) Verboom & H.P.Linder, indigenous

== Schizachyrium ==
Genus Schizachyrium:

- Schizachyrium brevifolium (Sw.) Nees ex Buse, indigenous
- Schizachyrium exile (Hochst.) Pilg. indigenous
- Schizachyrium jeffreysii (Hack.) Stapf, indigenous
- Schizachyrium rupestre (K.Schum.) Stapf, indigenous
- Schizachyrium sanguineum (Retz.) Alston, indigenous
- Schizachyrium ursulus Stapf, indigenous

== Schmidtia ==
Genus Schmidtia:

- Schmidtia glabra Pilg. accepted as Schmidtia pappophoroides Steud. present
- Schmidtia kalahariensis Stent, indigenous
- Schmidtia pappophoroides Steud. indigenous

== Schoenefeldiella ==
Genus Schoenefeldiella:

- Schoenefeldiella transiens (Pilg.) P.M.Peterson. indigenous

== Sclerochloa ==
Genus Sclerochloa:

- Sclerochloa angusta Nees, accepted as Puccinellia angusta (Nees) C.A.Sm. & C.E.Hubb. present

== Secale ==
Genus Secale:

- Secale africanum Stapf, accepted as Secale strictum (J.Presl) J.Presl subsp. africanum (Stapf) K.Hammer, present
- Secale strictum (J.Presl) J.Presl, indigenous
  - Secale strictum (J.Presl) J.Presl subsp. africanum (Stapf) K.Hammer, endemic

== Sehima ==
Genus Sehima:

- Sehima galpinii Stent, indigenous
- Sehima ischaemoides Forssk. indigenous

== Setaria ==
Genus Setaria: (including Paspalidium)

- Setaria appendiculata (Hack.) Stapf, indigenous
- Setaria chevalieri Stapf, accepted as Setaria megaphylla (Steud.) T.Durand & Schinz, present
  - Setaria chevalieri Stapf subsp. racemosa de Wit, accepted as Setaria megaphylla (Steud.) T.Durand & Schinz, present
- Setaria geminata (Forssk.) Veldkamp, syn. Paspalidium geminatum (Forssk.) Stapf, indigenous
- Setaria geniculata (Lam.) P.Beauv. not indigenous, naturalised
- Setaria homonyma (Steud.) Chiov. indigenous
- Setaria incrassata (Hochst.) Hack. indigenous
- Setaria italica (L.) P.Beauv. not indigenous, naturalised
- Setaria laeta de Wit, endemic
- Setaria lindenbergiana (Nees) Stapf, indigenous
- Setaria megaphylla (Steud.) T.Durand & Schinz, indigenous
- Setaria nigrirostris (Nees) T.Durand & Schinz, indigenous
  - Setaria nigrirostris (Nees) T.Durand & Schinz var. pallida de Wit, accepted as Setaria incrassata (Hochst.) Hack. present
- Setaria obscura de Wit, endemic
- Setaria obtusifolia (Delile) Morrone, syn. Paspalidium obtusifolium (Delile) N.D.Simpson, indigenous
- Setaria pallide-fusca (Schumach.) Stapf & C.E.Hubb. accepted as Setaria pumila (Poir.) Roem. & Schult. present
- Setaria plicatilis (Hochst.) Hack. ex Engl. indigenous
- Setaria pumila (Poir.) Roem. & Schult. indigenous
- Setaria rigida Stapf, indigenous
- Setaria sagittifolia (A.Rich.) Walp. indigenous
- Setaria sphacelata (Schumach.) Stapf & C.E.Hubb. ex M.B.Moss, indigenous
  - Setaria sphacelata (Schumach.) Stapf & C.E.Hubb. ex M.B.Moss var. sericea (Stapf) Clayton, indigenous
  - Setaria sphacelata (Schumach.) Stapf & C.E.Hubb. ex M.B.Moss var. sphacelata, indigenous
  - Setaria sphacelata (Schumach.) Stapf & C.E.Hubb. ex M.B.Moss var. splendida (Stapf) Clayton, indigenous
  - Setaria sphacelata (Schumach.) Stapf & C.E.Hubb. ex M.B.Moss var. torta (Stapf) Clayton, indigenous
- Setaria ustilata de Wit, accepted as Setaria pumila (Poir.) Roem. & Schult. present
- Setaria verticillata (L.) P.Beauv. indigenous

== Sorghastrum ==
Genus Sorghastrum:

- Sorghastrum friesii (Pilg.) Pilg. accepted as Sorghastrum nudipes Nash, present
- Sorghastrum nudipes Nash, indigenous
- Sorghastrum stipoides (Kunth) Nash, indigenous

== Sorghum ==
Genus Sorghum:

- Sorghum bicolor (L.) Moench, indigenous
  - Sorghum bicolor (L.) Moench subsp. arundinaceum (Desv.) de Wet & Harlan, indigenous
  - Sorghum bicolor (L.) Moench subsp. drummondii (Steud.) de Wet, indigenous
- Sorghum halepense (L.) Pers. not indigenous, naturalised, invasive
- Sorghum versicolor Andersson, indigenous

== Spartina ==
Genus Spartina:

- Spartina alterniflora Loisel. not indigenous, naturalised, invasive
- Spartina maritima (Curtis) Fernald, indigenous

== Sphenopus ==
Genus Sphenopus:

- Sphenopus divaricatus (Gouan) Rchb. not indigenous, naturalised

== Sporobolus ==
Genus Sporobolus:

- Sporobolus acinifolius Stapf, indigenous
- Sporobolus africanus (Poir.) Robyns & Tournay, indigenous
- Sporobolus albicans (Nees ex Trin.) Nees, indigenous
- Sporobolus centrifugus (Trin.) Nees, indigenous
- Sporobolus congoensis Franch. indigenous
- Sporobolus conrathii Chiov. indigenous
- Sporobolus consimilis Fresen. indigenous
- Sporobolus coromandelianus (Retz.) Kunth, indigenous
- Sporobolus discosporus Nees, indigenous
- Sporobolus engleri Pilg. indigenous
- Sporobolus festivus Hochst. ex A.Rich. indigenous
- Sporobolus fimbriatus (Trin.) Nees, indigenous
- Sporobolus fourcadii Stent, endemic
- Sporobolus gillii Stent, accepted as Sporobolus ioclados (Trin.) Nees, present
- Sporobolus ioclados (Trin.) Nees, indigenous
- Sporobolus kentrophyllus (K.Schum.) Clayton, accepted as Sporobolus ioclados (Trin.) Nees
- Sporobolus ludwigii Hochst. indigenous
- Sporobolus molleri Hack. indigenous
- Sporobolus natalensis (Steud.) T.Durand & Schinz, indigenous
- Sporobolus nebulosus Hack. indigenous
- Sporobolus nervosus Hochst. indigenous
- Sporobolus nitens Stent, indigenous
- Sporobolus oxyphyllus Fish, endemic
- Sporobolus panicoides A.Rich. indigenous
- Sporobolus parvulus Stent, accepted as Sporobolus coromandelianus (Retz.) Kunth, present
- Sporobolus pectinatus Hack. endemic
- Sporobolus pyramidalis P.Beauv. indigenous
- Sporobolus rangei Pilg. indigenous
- Sporobolus rehmannii Hack. accepted as Sporobolus fimbriatus (Trin.) Nees, present
- Sporobolus salsus Mez, indigenous
- Sporobolus sanguineus Rendle, indigenous
- Sporobolus spicatus (Vahl) Kunth, indigenous
- Sporobolus stapfianus Gand. indigenous
- Sporobolus subtilis Kunth, indigenous
- Sporobolus subulatus Hack. indigenous
- Sporobolus tenellus (Spreng.) Kunth, indigenous
- Sporobolus transvaalensis Gooss. accepted as Sporobolus albicans (Nees ex Trin.) Nees, present
- Sporobolus virginicus (L.) Kunth, indigenous
- Sporobolus vryburgensis Stent, accepted as Sporobolus ioclados (Trin.) Nees, present
- Sporobolus welwitschii Rendle, indigenous

== Steinchisma ==
Genus Steinchisma:

- Steinchisma hians (Elliott) Nash & Small, not indigenous, naturalised

== Stenotaphrum ==
Genus Stenotaphrum:

- Stenotaphrum dimidiatum (L.) Brongn. indigenous
- Stenotaphrum secundatum (Walter) Kuntze, indigenous

== Stereochlaena ==
Genus Stereochlaena:

- Stereochlaena cameronii (Stapf) Pilg. indigenous

== Stiburus ==
Genus Stiburus:

- Stiburus alopecuroides (Hack.) Stapf, indigenous
- Stiburus conrathii Hack. indigenous

== Stipa ==
Genus Stipa:

- Stipa capensis Thunb. indigenous
- Stipa clandestina Hack. accepted as Amelichloa clandestina (Hack.) Arriaga & Barkworth, not indigenous, naturalised
- Stipa dregeana Steud. indigenous
  - Stipa dregeana Steud. var. dregeana, endemic
  - Stipa dregeana Steud. var. elongata (Nees) Stapf, indigenous
- Stipa papposa Nees, accepted as Jarava plumosa (Spreng.) S.W.L.Jacobs & J.Everett, not indigenous, naturalised
- Stipa variabilis Hughes, accepted as Austrostipa variabilis (Hughes) S.W.L.Jacobs & J.Everett, not indigenous, naturalised

== Stipagrostis ==
Genus Stipagrostis:

- Stipagrostis amabilis (Schweick.) De Winter, indigenous
- Stipagrostis anomala De Winter, indigenous
- Stipagrostis brevifolia (Nees) De Winter, indigenous
- Stipagrostis ciliata (Desf.) De Winter, indigenous
  - Stipagrostis ciliata (Desf.) De Winter var. capensis (Trin. & Rupr.) De Winter, indigenous
- Stipagrostis dregeana Nees, indigenous
- Stipagrostis fastigiata (Hack.) De Winter, indigenous
- Stipagrostis geminifolia Nees, indigenous
- Stipagrostis hirtigluma (Steud.) De Winter, indigenous
  - Stipagrostis hirtigluma (Steud.) De Winter subsp. patula (Hack.) De Winter, indigenous
  - Stipagrostis hirtigluma (Steud.) De Winter subsp. pearsonii (Henrard) De Winter, indigenous
- Stipagrostis hochstetteriana (Beck ex Hack.) De Winter, indigenous
  - Stipagrostis hochstetteriana (Beck ex Hack.) De Winter var. hochstetteriana, indigenous
  - Stipagrostis hochstetteriana (Beck ex Hack.) De Winter var. secalina (Henrard) De Winter, indigenous
- Stipagrostis lutescens (Nees) De Winter, indigenous
  - Stipagrostis lutescens (Nees) De Winter var. lutescens, indigenous
- Stipagrostis namaquensis (Nees) De Winter, indigenous
- Stipagrostis obtusa (Delile) Nees, indigenous
- Stipagrostis proxima (Steud.) De Winter, endemic
- Stipagrostis schaeferi (Mez) De Winter, indigenous
- Stipagrostis subacaulis (Nees) De Winter, indigenous
- Stipagrostis uniplumis (Licht.) De Winter, indigenous
  - Stipagrostis uniplumis (Licht.) De Winter var. neesii (Trin. & Rupr.) De Winter, indigenous
  - Stipagrostis uniplumis (Licht.) De Winter var. uniplumis, indigenous
- Stipagrostis zeyheri (Nees) De Winter, indigenous
  - Stipagrostis zeyheri (Nees) De Winter subsp. barbata (Stapf) De Winter, endemic
  - Stipagrostis zeyheri (Nees) De Winter subsp. macropus (Nees) De Winter, indigenous
  - Stipagrostis zeyheri (Nees) De Winter subsp. sericans (Hack.) De Winter, indigenous
  - Stipagrostis zeyheri (Nees) De Winter subsp. zeyheri, endemic

== Streblochaete ==
Genus Streblochaete:

- Streblochaete longiarista (A.Rich.) Pilg. indigenous

== Styppeiochloa ==
Genus Styppeiochloa:

- Styppeiochloa gynoglossa (Gooss.) De Winter, indigenous

== Tarigidia ==
Genus Tarigidia:

- Tarigidia aequiglumis (Gooss.) Stent, indigenous

== Tenaxia ==
Genus Tenaxia:

- Tenaxia aureocephala (J.G.Anderson) N.P.Barker & H.P.Linder, indigenous
- Tenaxia disticha (Nees) N.P.Barker & H.P.Linder, indigenous
- Tenaxia dura (Stapf) N.P.Barker & H.P.Linder, indigenous
- Tenaxia guillarmodiae (Conert) N.P.Barker & H.P.Linder, indigenous
- Tenaxia stricta (Schrad.) N.P.Barker & H.P.Linder, indigenous

== Tetrachne ==
Genus Tetrachne:

- Tetrachne dregei Nees, indigenous

== Tetrapogon ==
Genus Tetrapogon:

- Tetrapogon tenellus (Roxb.) Chiov. indigenous

== Thamnocalamus ==
Genus Thamnocalamus:

- Thamnocalamus tessellatus (Nees) Soderstr. & R.P.Ellis, indigenous

== Themeda ==
Genus Themeda:

- Themeda triandra Forssk. indigenous

== Thinopyrum ==
Genus Thinopyrum:

- Thinopyrum distichum (Thunb.) A.Love, not indigenous, naturalised

== Trachypogon ==
Genus Trachypogon:

- Trachypogon spicatus (L.f.) Kuntze, indigenous

== Tragus ==
Genus Tragus:

- Tragus berteronianus Schult. indigenous
- Tragus koelerioides Asch. indigenous
- Tragus racemosus (L.) All. indigenous

== Tribolium ==
Genus Tribolium:

- Tribolium acutiflorum (Nees) Renvoize, endemic
- Tribolium alternans (Nees) Renvoize, accepted as Tribolium uniolae (L.f.) Renvoize, present
- Tribolium amplexum Renvoize, accepted as Tribolium uniolae (L.f.) Renvoize, present
- Tribolium brachystachyum (Nees) Renvoize, endemic
- Tribolium ciliare (Stapf) Renvoize, endemic
- Tribolium curvum (Nees) Verboom & H.P.Linder, indigenous
- Tribolium echinatum (Thunb.) Renvoize, endemic
- Tribolium hispidum (Thunb.) Desv. endemic
- Tribolium obliterum (Hemsl.) Renvoize, endemic
- Tribolium obtusifolium (Nees) Renvoize, endemic
- Tribolium pleuropogon (Stapf) Verboom & H.P.Linder, accepted as Tribolium curvum (Nees) Verboom & H.P.Linder, indigenous
- Tribolium purpureum (L.f.) Verboom & H.P.Linder, indigenous
- Tribolium pusillum (Nees) H.P.Linder & Davidse, endemic
- Tribolium tenellum (Nees) Verboom & H.P.Linder, indigenous
- Tribolium uniolae (L.f.) Renvoize, endemic
- Tribolium utriculosum (Nees) Renvoize, endemic

== Tricholaena ==
Genus Tricholaena:

- Tricholaena capensis (Licht. ex Roem. & Schult.) Nees, indigenous
  - Tricholaena capensis (Licht. ex Roem. & Schult.) Nees subsp. capensis, indigenous
- Tricholaena monachne (Trin.) Stapf & C.E.Hubb. indigenous

== Trichoneura ==
Genus Trichoneura:

- Trichoneura eleusinoides (Rendle) Ekman, indigenous
  - Trichoneura eleusinoides (Rendle) Ekman subsp. limpopoensis Fish, endemic
- Trichoneura grandiglumis (Nees) Ekman, indigenous

== Trichopteryx ==
Genus Trichopteryx:

- Trichopteryx dregeana Nees, indigenous

== Tripogon ==
Genus Tripogon:

- Tripogon minimus (A.Rich.) Steud. indigenous

== Triraphis ==
Genus Triraphis:

- Triraphis andropogonoides (Steud.) E.Phillips, indigenous
- Triraphis purpurea Hack. indigenous
- Triraphis ramosissima Hack. indigenous
- Triraphis rehmannii Hack. accepted as Triraphis andropogonoides (Steud.) E.Phillips, present
- Triraphis schinzii Hack. indigenous

== Tristachya ==
Genus Tristachya:

- Tristachya biseriata Stapf, endemic
- Tristachya leucothrix Trin. ex Nees, indigenous
- Tristachya rehmannii Hack. indigenous

== Urelytrum ==
Genus Urelytrum:

- Urelytrum agropyroides (Hack.) Hack. indigenous

== Urochlaena ==
Genus Urochlaena:

- Urochlaena major Rendle, accepted as Tribolium pusillum (Nees) H.P.Linder & Davidse, present
- Urochlaena pusilla Nees, accepted as Tribolium pusillum (Nees) H.P.Linder & Davidse, present

== Urochloa ==
Genus Urochloa:

- Urochloa brachyura (Hack.) Stapf, indigenous
- Urochloa mosambicensis (Hack.) Dandy, indigenous
- Urochloa oligotricha (Fig. & De Not.) Henrard, indigenous
- Urochloa panicoides P.Beauv. indigenous
- Urochloa stolonifera (Gooss.) Chippind. indigenous
- Urochloa trichopus (Hochst.) Stapf, indigenous

== Vetiveria ==
Genus Vetiveria:

- Vetiveria nigritana (Benth.) Stapf, accepted as Chrysopogon nigritanus (Benth.) Veldkamp

== Vulpia ==
Genus Vulpia:

- Vulpia bromoides (L.) Gray, not indigenous, naturalised
- Vulpia fasciculata (Forssk.) Samp. not indigenous, naturalised
- Vulpia megastachya Nees, accepted as Festuca vulpioides Steud. present
- Vulpia muralis (Kunth) Nees, not indigenous, naturalised
- Vulpia myuros (L.) C.C.Gmel. not indigenous, naturalised
