= Catalepis =

Scientific classification
- Kingdom: Plantae
- Clade: Tracheophytes
- Clade: Angiosperms
- Clade: Monocots
- Clade: Commelinids
- Order: Poales
- Family: Poaceae
- Subfamily: Chloridoideae
- Tribe: Eragrostideae
- Subtribe: Eragrostidinae
- Genus: Catalepis; Stent & Stapf
- Species: C. gracilis

Binomial name
- Catalepis gracilis Stent & Stapf

Genus of grasses

Catalepis is a genus of plants in the grass family native to southern Africa. The only known species is Catalepis gracilis, commonly called cause grass, found in Lesotho and eastern South Africa.

== See also ==
- List of Poaceae genera
