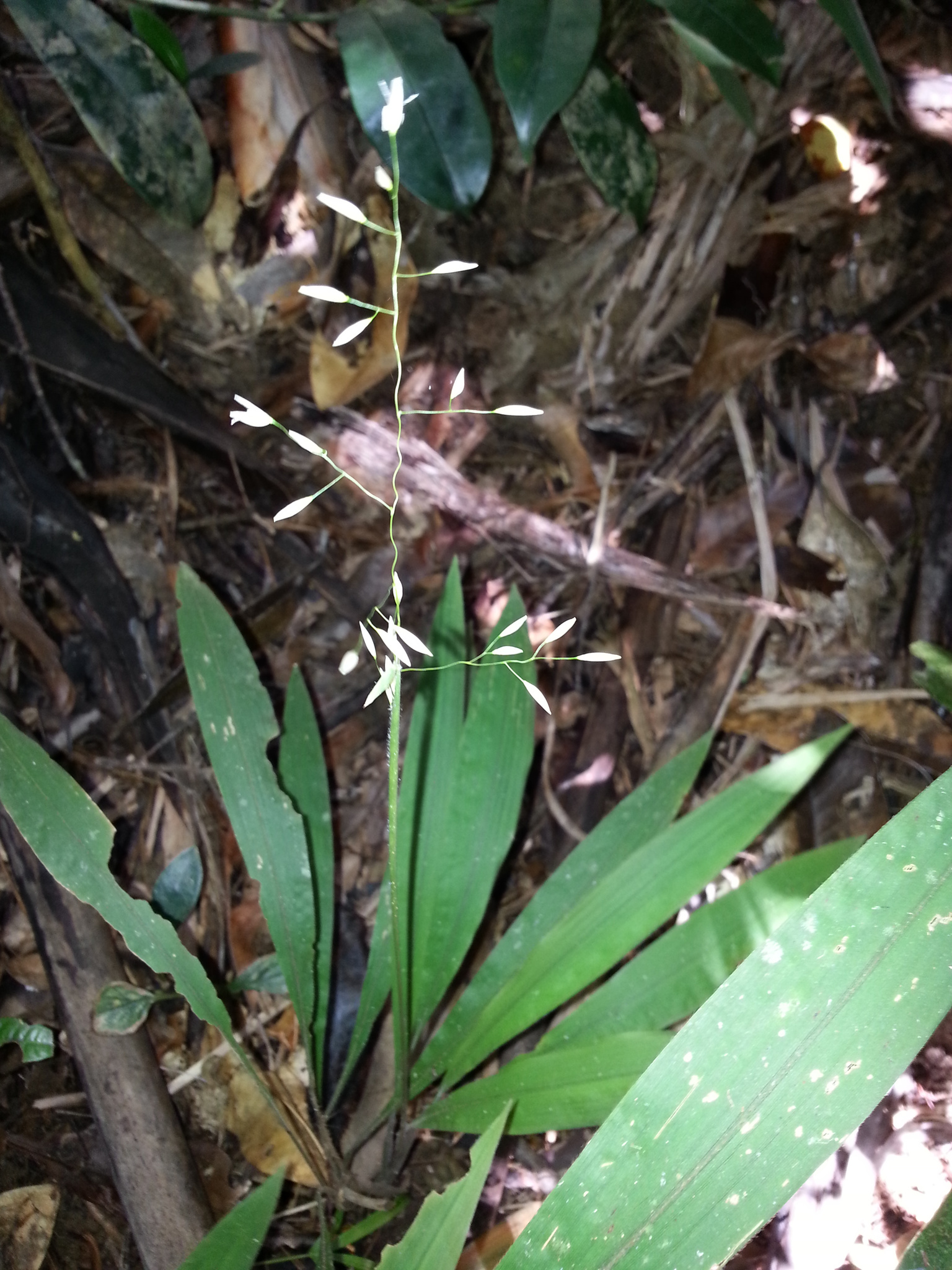
- Maltebrunia leersioides

Scientific classification
- Kingdom: Plantae
- Clade: Tracheophytes
- Clade: Angiosperms
- Clade: Monocots
- Clade: Commelinids
- Order: Poales
- Family: Poaceae
- Subfamily: Oryzoideae
- Tribe: Oryzeae
- Subtribe: Oryzinae
- Genus: Maltebrunia; Kunth

Type species
- Maltebrunia leersioides Kunth

Synonyms
- Oryza sect. Maltebrunia (Kunth) Rchb.

= Maltebrunia =

Genus of plants

Maltebrunia is a genus of African plants in the grass family.

Species

- Maltebrunia leersioides Kunth – Madagascar
- Maltebrunia letestui (Koechlin) Koechlin – Cameroon, Gabon, Republic of the Congo
- Maltebrunia maroana Aug.DC – Madagascar
- Maltebrunia schliebenii (Pilg.) C.E.Hubb. – Tanzania

formerly included

Maltebrunia prehensilis - Prosphytochloa prehensilis – South Africa, Eswatini
