= Festuca caprina =

Scientific classification
- Kingdom: Plantae
- Clade: Tracheophytes
- Clade: Angiosperms
- Clade: Monocots
- Clade: Commelinids
- Order: Poales
- Family: Poaceae
- Subfamily: Pooideae
- Genus: Festuca
- Species: F. caprina

Binomial name
- Festuca caprina Nees

Synonyms
- Festuca nubigena subsp. caprina (Nees) St.-Yves in Rev. Bretonne Bot. Pure Appl. 2: 79 (1927); Festuca caprina var. irrasa Stapf in W.H.Harvey & auct. suc. (eds.), Fl. Cap. 7: 720 (1900); Festuca nubigena var. longiaristata St.-Yves in Rev. Bretonne Bot. Pure Appl. 2: 79 (1927)

Species of grass

Festuca caprina is a species of grass in the family Poaceae. This species is native to Cape Provinces, Eswatini, Free State, KwaZulu-Natal, Lesotho, Malawi, Northern Provinces, Tanzania, Zambia, and Zimbabwe. It was first described in 1841.
