= Chaetobromus =

Scientific classification
- Kingdom: Plantae
- Clade: Tracheophytes
- Clade: Angiosperms
- Clade: Monocots
- Clade: Commelinids
- Order: Poales
- Family: Poaceae
- Subfamily: Danthonioideae
- Tribe: Danthonieae
- Genus: Chaetobromus; Nees
- Species: C. involucratus

Binomial name
- Chaetobromus involucratus (Schrad.) Nees

Synonyms
- Danthonia sect. Chaetobromus (Nees) Steud.; Avena involucrata Schrad.; Danthonia involucrata (Schrad.) Schrad.; Pentameris involucrata (Schrad.) Nees; Chaetobromus dregeanus Nees; Danthonia dregeana (Nees) Steud.; Chaetobromus interceptus Nees; Danthonia intercepta (Nees) Steud.; Chaetobromus schraderi Stapf; Chaetobromus schlechteri Pilg.; Chaetobromus involucratus var. sericeus Nees

Genus of grasses

Chaetobromus is a genus of African plants in the grass family.

Species

There is only one known species, Chaetobromus involucratus, native to Namibia and Cape Province.

Subspecies

Three subspecies are accepted

- Chaetobromus involucratus subsp. dregeanus (Nees) Verboom
- Chaetobromus involucratus subsp. involucratus
- Chaetobromus involucratus subsp. sericeus (Nees) Verboom

Formerly included

taxa once considered part of Chaetobromus but now regarded as better suited to Tenaxia :

- Chaetobromus fascicularis - Tenaxia stricta
- Chaetobromus strictus - Tenaxia stricta

== See also ==
- List of Poaceae genera
