= Sydney Margaret Stent =

South African botanist (1875–1942)

Sydney Margaret Stent (11 October 1875 – 19 April 1942) was a South African botanist. Stent's main interest was grasses
