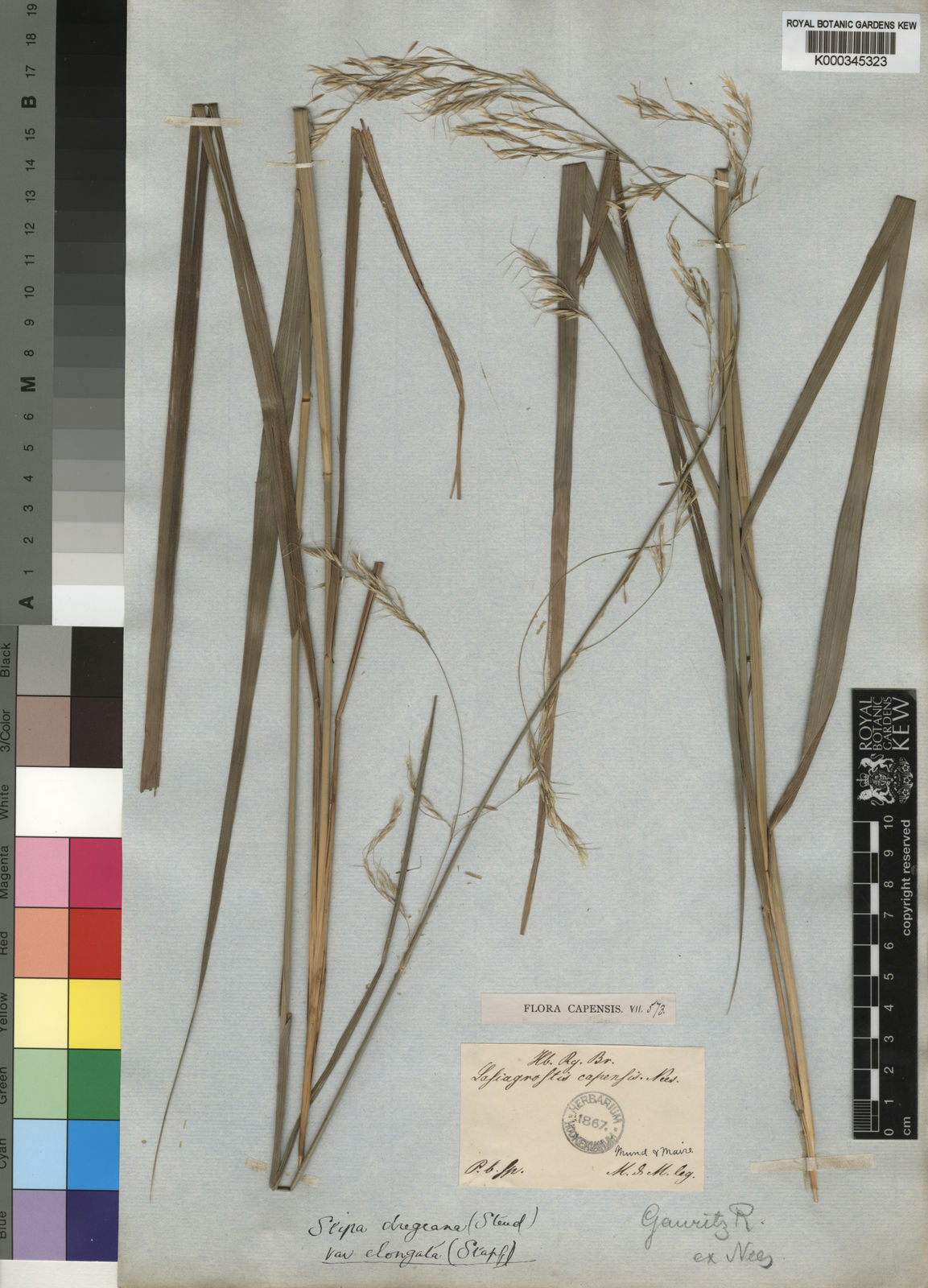
- Herbarium specimen of Stipa dregeana Steud.

Scientific classification
- Kingdom: Plantae
- Clade: Tracheophytes
- Clade: Angiosperms
- Clade: Monocots
- Clade: Commelinids
- Order: Poales
- Family: Poaceae
- Subfamily: Pooideae
- Genus: Stipa
- Species: S. dregeana

Binomial name
- Stipa dregeana Steud.

Synonyms
- Lasiagrostis capensis Nees; Stipa capensis (Nees) Kuntze, nom. illeg.

= Stipa dregeana =

Species of grass

Stipa dregeana is a species of grass. It is a perennial native to the Cape Provinces of South Africa.

== Description ==
Stipa dregeana is a perennial, tufted grass that grows in clumps, with stems usually exceeding 1 m and sometimes reaching up to 1.5 m in height. The leaves are linear and relatively broad, 30–60 cm long and 6–12 mm wide, with surfaces that may be smooth or sparsely hairy, giving the plant a variable texture. The ligule is a short, membranous structure, 2–3 mm long, and without hairs.

The inflorescence is a panicle that may be open and loose or more contracted, elliptic in outline, and 15–40 cm long. Its branches spread or ascend, often scabrous to the touch, and may bear spikelets almost to the base. Spikelets are solitary, pedicelled, and measure 5–7 mm in length, each containing a single fertile floret that detaches at maturity.

The glumes are thin, three‑veined, and slightly longer than the florets, ranging from 5–10 mm long, with acute to acuminate tips. The fertile lemma is 5–6 mm long, densely hairy, and ends in a two‑toothed apex from which a straight awn arises, typically 10–18 mm long. The palea is equal in length to the lemma, keeled, and pubescent along its sides.

Flowers bear two lodicules, three small anthers with brush‑like tips, and two stigmas. The ovary is glabrous. The fruit is a caryopsis with a linear hilum and an adherent pericarp. Flowering has been recorded from August to May. The species occurs along forest margins and in montane habitats, ranging from the Cape Peninsula through southern Africa to eastern tropical Africa.

== Distribution and habitat ==
Stipa dregeana is native to southern and eastern Africa. In South Africa it occurs from the Cape Peninsula eastwards, extending through Lesotho and Eswatini into tropical East Africa. The species is typically found along forest margins and in montane grasslands, where it grows in clumps among other grasses. Flowering has been recorded from August to May.
