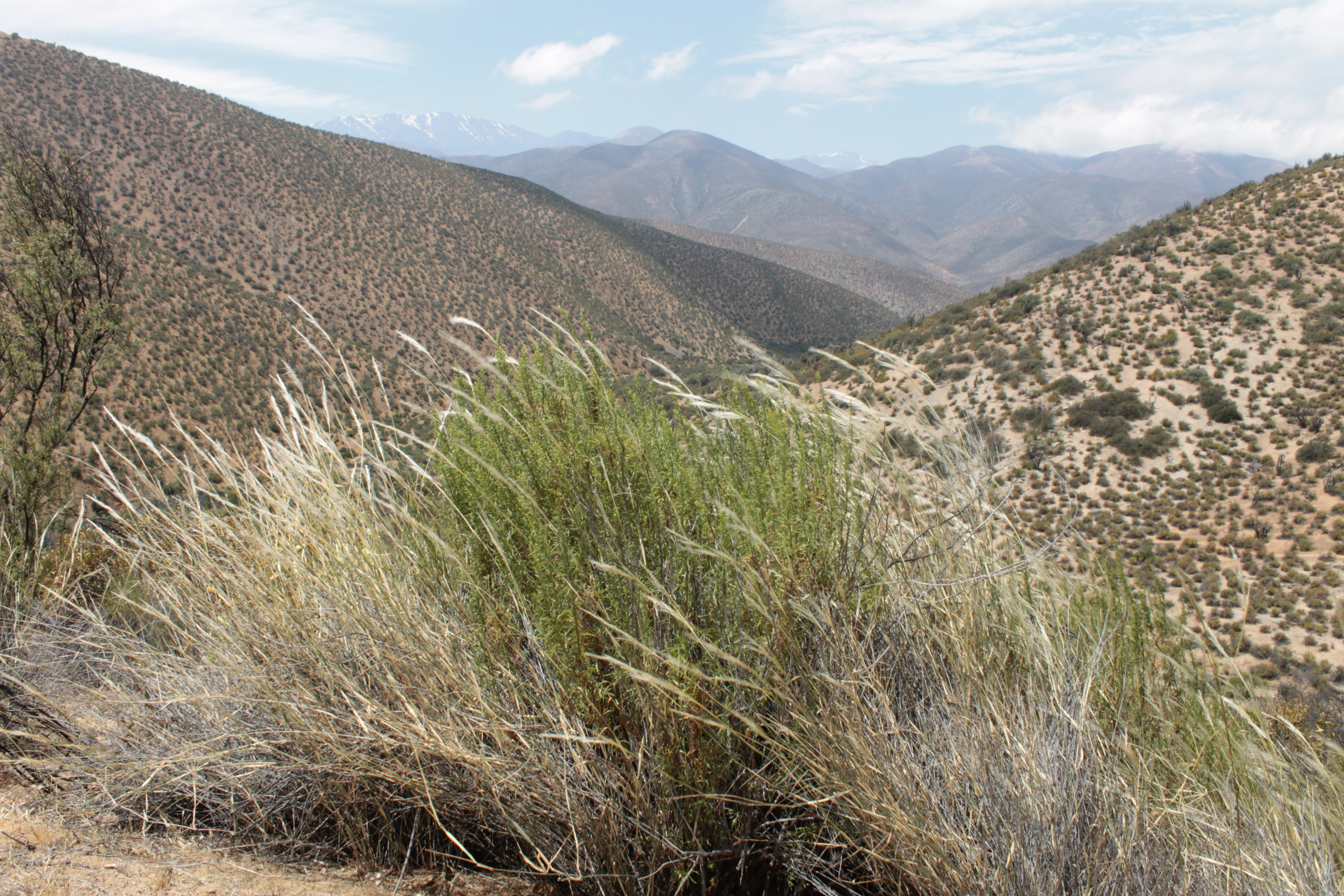
- In Chile

Scientific classification
- Kingdom: Plantae
- Clade: Embryophytes
- Clade: Tracheophytes
- Clade: Spermatophytes
- Clade: Angiosperms
- Clade: Monocots
- Clade: Commelinids
- Order: Poales
- Family: Poaceae
- Subfamily: Pooideae
- Genus: Jarava
- Species: J. plumosa

Binomial name
- Jarava plumosa (Spreng.) S.W.L.Jacobs & J.Everett

Synonyms
- List: Achnatherum papposum (Nees) Barkworth; Arundo plumosa (Spreng.) Schult. & Schult.f.; Calamagrostis plumosa Spreng.; Stipa delilei Steud.; Stipa papposa Nees; Stipa papposa Delile; Stipa papposa f. major Speg.; Stipa papposa f. minor Speg.; Stipa tenuiflora Phil.

= Jarava plumosa =

Species of plant

Jarava plumosa (syn. Stipa papposa) is a species of grass in the family Poaceae, native to the Southern Cone of South America. It has been introduced to other places with a Mediterranean climate; California, Spain, Israel, the Cape Provinces of South Africa, and South Australia. As its synonym Stipa papposa it has gained the Royal Horticultural Society's Award of Garden Merit as an ornamental in spite of its invasive potential.
