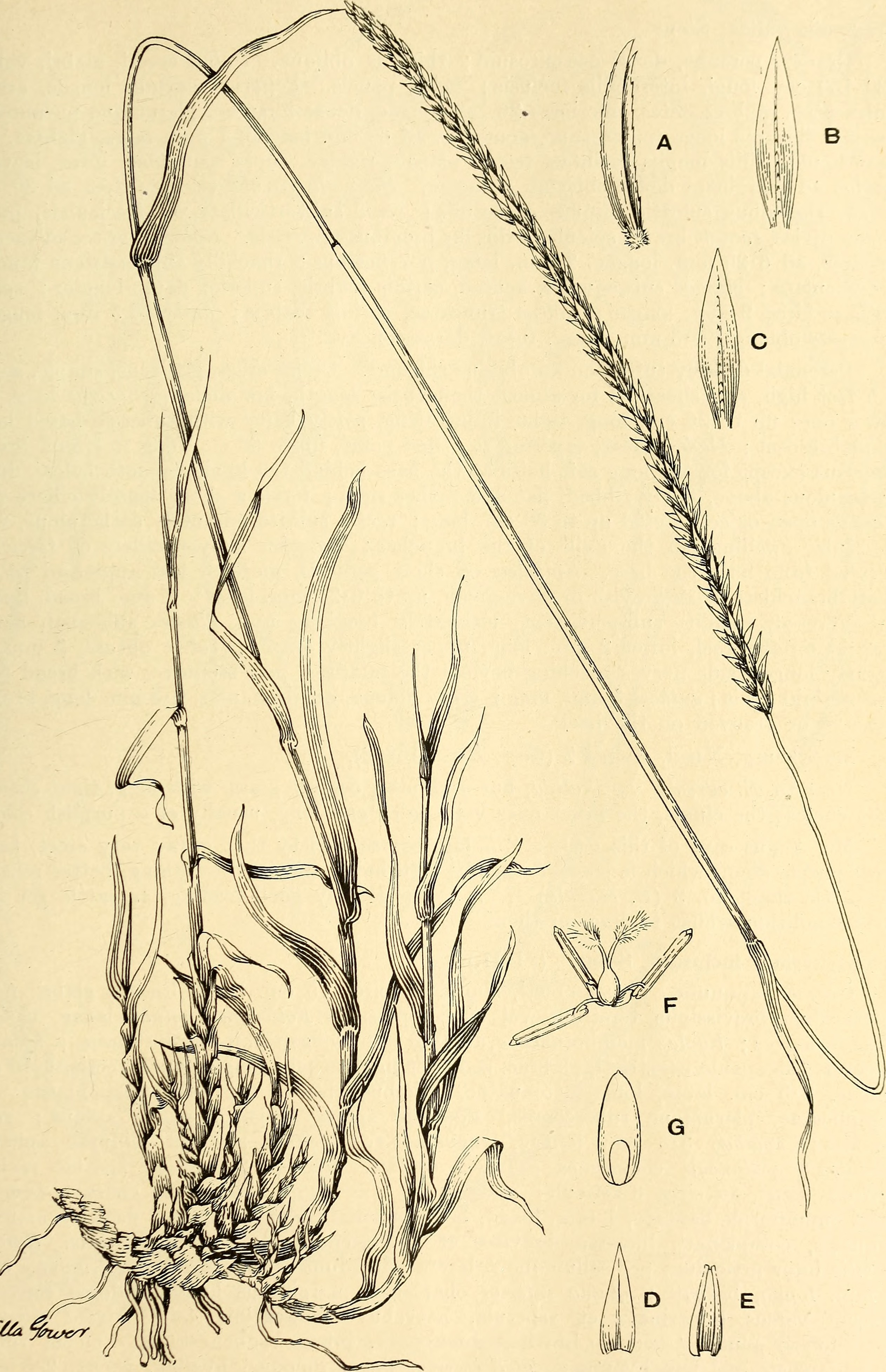

Scientific classification
- Kingdom: Plantae
- Clade: Tracheophytes
- Clade: Angiosperms
- Clade: Monocots
- Clade: Commelinids
- Order: Poales
- Family: Poaceae
- Subfamily: Chloridoideae
- Tribe: Cynodonteae
- Subtribe: Perotidinae
- Genus: Mosdenia; Stent
- Species: M. leptostachys

Binomial name
- Mosdenia leptostachys (Ficalho & Hiern) Clayton

Synonyms
- Mosdenia phleoides (Hack.) Stent; Mosdenia transvaalensis Stent; Mosdenia waterbergensis Stent; Perotis phleoides Hack.; Sporobolus leptostachys Ficalho & Hiern

= Mosdenia =

Genus of grasses

Mosdenia is a genus of African plants in the grass family. The only known species is Mosdenia leptostachys, native to Angola and Limpopo.
