= Tetrachne =

Scientific classification
- Kingdom: Plantae
- Clade: Tracheophytes
- Clade: Angiosperms
- Clade: Monocots
- Clade: Commelinids
- Order: Poales
- Family: Poaceae
- Subfamily: Chloridoideae
- Tribe: Eragrostideae
- Subtribe: Unioliinae
- Genus: Tetrachne; Nees
- Species: T. dregei

Binomial name
- Tetrachne dregei Nees

Genus of grasses

Tetrachne is a monotypic genus of grass in the family Poaceae. The sole species is Tetrachne dregei, known by the common name robies cocksfoot. It is native to South Africa.
