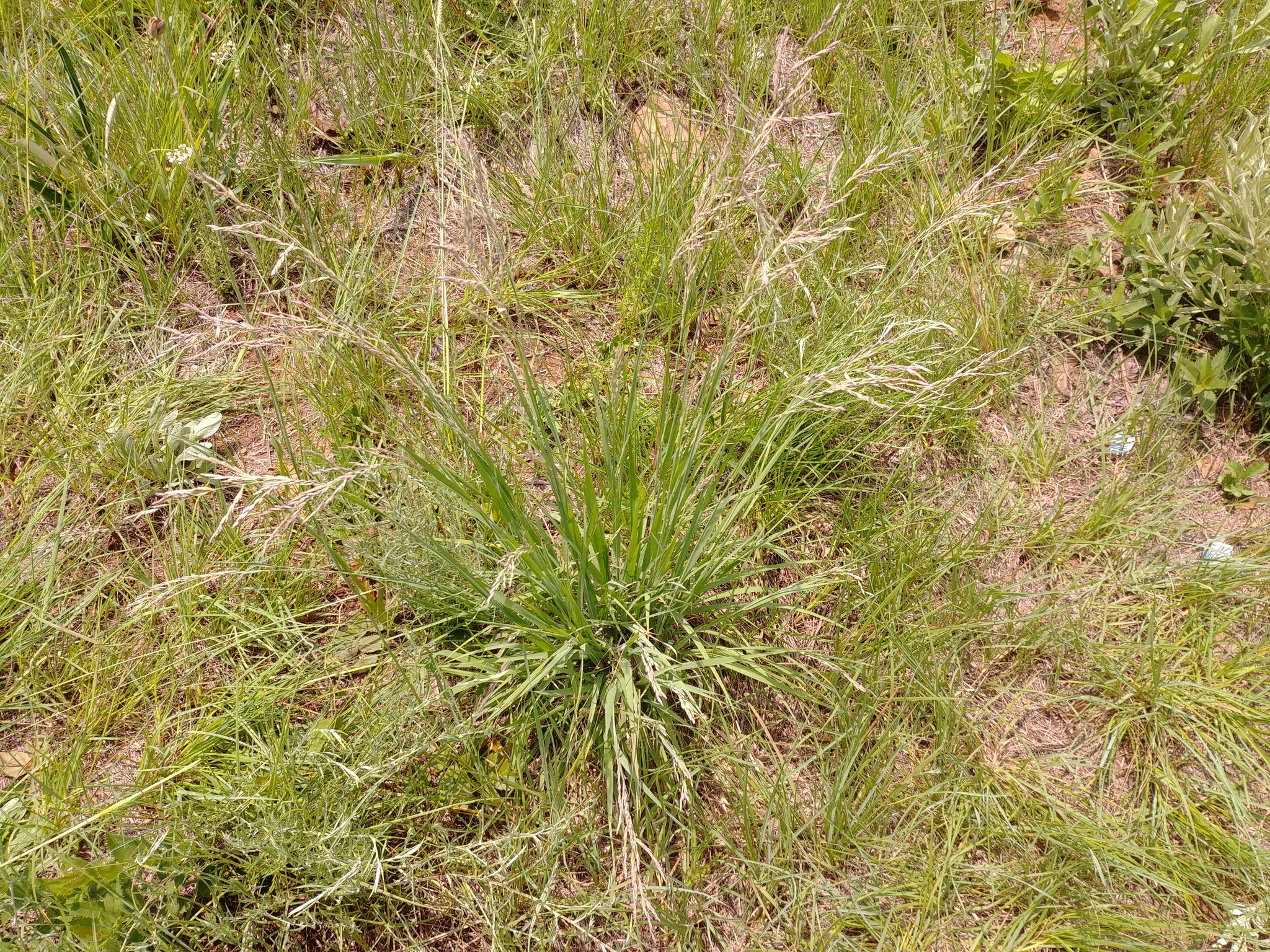
- Bewsia biflora in South Africa

Scientific classification
- Kingdom: Plantae
- Clade: Tracheophytes
- Clade: Angiosperms
- Clade: Monocots
- Clade: Commelinids
- Order: Poales
- Family: Poaceae
- Subfamily: Chloridoideae
- Tribe: Cynodonteae
- Subtribe: Hubbardochloinae
- Genus: Bewsia; Goossens
- Species: B. biflora

Binomial name
- Bewsia biflora (Hack.) Gooss.

Synonyms
- Diplachne biflora Hack.; Diplachne biflora var. buchananii Stapf; Avenastrum flabellatum Peter

= Bewsia =

Genus of grasses

Bewsia is a genus of African plants in the grass family. The only known species is Bewsia biflora, widespread across much of sub-Saharan Africa from Ivory Coast to Tanzania to KwaZulu-Natal.

== See also ==
- List of Poaceae genera
