= Setaria geniculata =

Setaria geniculata can refer to the following grass species:

- Setaria geniculata (Poir.) P.Beauv., a synonym of Setaria parviflora (Poir.) Kerguélen
- Setaria geniculata Sieber ex Kunth, a synonym of Cenchrus setosus Sw. subsp. setosus
