= Melica dendroides =

Scientific classification
- Kingdom: Plantae
- Clade: Tracheophytes
- Clade: Angiosperms
- Clade: Monocots
- Clade: Commelinids
- Order: Poales
- Family: Poaceae
- Subfamily: Pooideae
- Genus: Melica
- Species: M. dendroides

Binomial name
- Melica dendroides Lehm.

Synonyms
- Melica afrorum var. decumbens Nees; Melica decumbens Thunb.; Melica neesii Stapf

Species of grass

Melica dendroides is a grass species in the family Poaceae. It is endemic to southern part of Africa.

== Description ==
The species is perennial and is caespitose as well. It culms are 30–60 centimetres (12–24 in) long with tubular The leaf-sheaths which are closed on one side. The leaf-blades are convolute, erect, and are 2–20 centimetres (0.79–7.87 in) long and 1.5–3.5 millimetres (0.059–0.138 in) wide. The surface of a leaf-blade is scabrous while the membrane is eciliated. The panicle is open, linear, secund and is 5–15 centimetres (2.0–5.9 in) long. The main panicle branches are indistinct and almost racemose.

Spikelets are cuneate and are solitary. They have fertile spikelets that are pediceled. The spikelets are also elliptic, are 10–15 millimetres (0.39–0.59 in) long, and have 2 fertile florets which are diminished at the apex. Lemma is chartaceous, lanceolated, and is 6–8.5 millimetres (0.24–0.33 in) long and 1.6–2 millimetres (0.063–0.079 in) wide. Its lemma have an obtuse apex while the fertile lemma itself is chartaceous, elliptic, keelless, and is 7–10 millimetres (0.28–0.39 in) long. It is also 7-9 veined while the surface of the lemma is villous with ciliated margins. Both the upper and lower glumes are elliptic, keelless, membranous, and are purple in colour. Their size is different though; lower one is 4–6 millimetres (0.16–0.24 in) long while the upper one is 9–12 millimetres (0.35–0.47 in) long. It palea is 2-veined.

Flowers are fleshy, oblong, truncate, have 2 lodicules and grow together. They have 3 anthers with fruits that are caryopsis. The fruit is also have additional pericarp with a linear hilum.
