= Megaloprotachne =

Scientific classification
- Kingdom: Plantae
- Clade: Tracheophytes
- Clade: Angiosperms
- Clade: Monocots
- Clade: Commelinids
- Order: Poales
- Family: Poaceae
- Subfamily: Panicoideae
- Supertribe: Panicodae
- Tribe: Paniceae
- Subtribe: Anthephorinae
- Genus: Megaloprotachne; C.E.Hubb.
- Species: M. albescens

Binomial name
- Megaloprotachne albescens C.E.Hubb.

Synonyms
- Megaloprotachne glabrescens Roiv.

Genus of grasses

Megaloprotachne is a genus of African plants in the grass family. The only known species is Megaloprotachne albescens, native to Angola, Zambia, Zimbabwe, Botswana, Namibia, and South Africa (Northern Cape, North West, and Limpopo)
