= Polevansia =

Scientific classification
- Kingdom: Plantae
- Clade: Tracheophytes
- Clade: Angiosperms
- Clade: Monocots
- Clade: Commelinids
- Order: Poales
- Family: Poaceae
- Subfamily: Chloridoideae
- Tribe: Cynodonteae
- Subtribe: Traginae
- Genus: Polevansia; De Winter
- Species: P. rigida

Binomial name
- Polevansia rigida De Winter

Genus of grasses

Polevansia is a genus of African plants in the grass family. The only known species is Polevansia rigida. native to Lesotho and to Cape Province.
