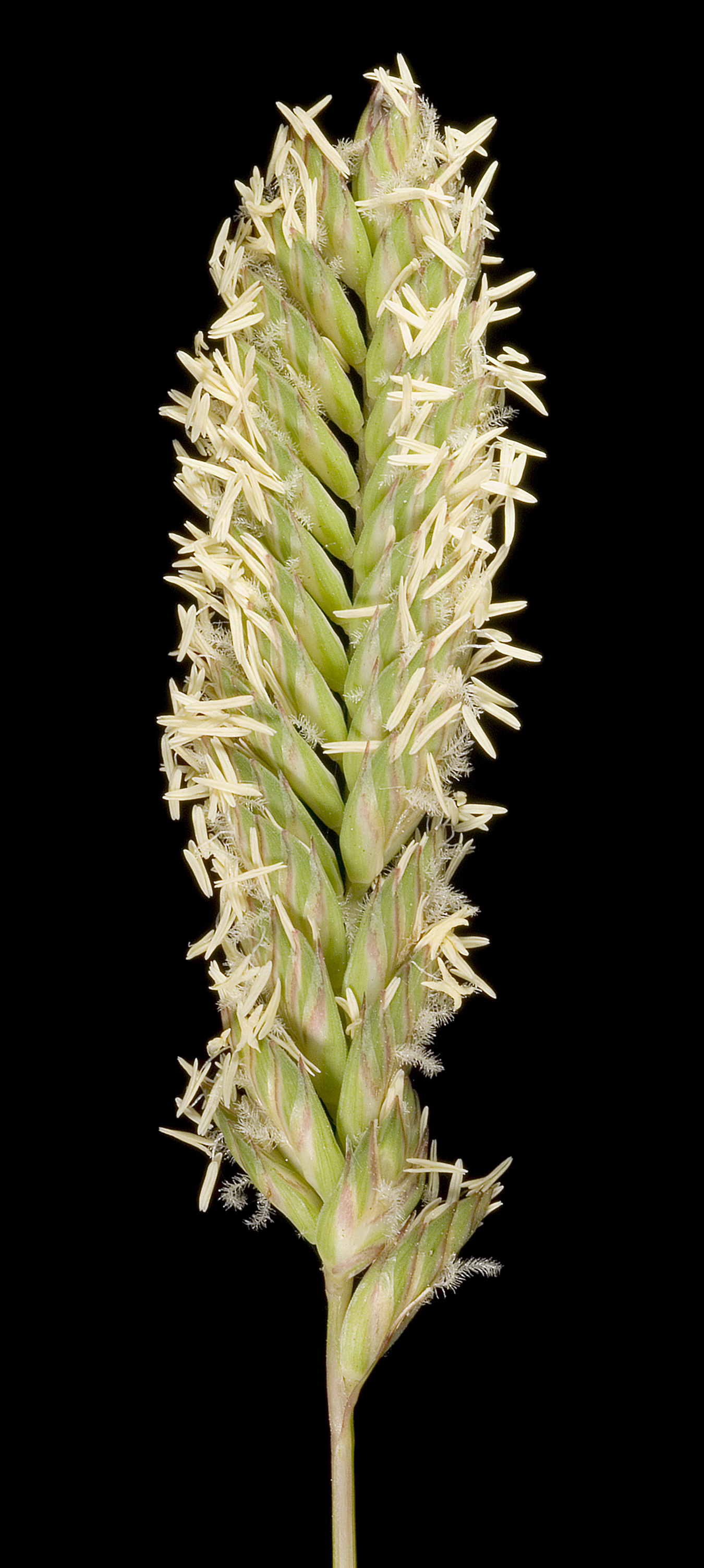

Scientific classification
- Kingdom: Plantae
- Clade: Tracheophytes
- Clade: Angiosperms
- Clade: Monocots
- Clade: Commelinids
- Order: Poales
- Family: Poaceae
- Genus: Tribolium
- Species: T. uniolae

Binomial name
- Tribolium uniolae (L.f.) Renvoize

= Tribolium uniolae =

Species of grass

Tribolium uniolae is a grass in the subfamily Danthonioideae of the Poaceae, native to Cape Province, South Africa. It was first described in by Carl Linnaeus, the younger, as Cynosurus uniolae, but in 1985 was transferred to the genus, Tribolium, by Stephen Andrew Renvoize.

In Australia, it is an introduced weed in both Victoria and Western Australia, where it generally grows on disturbed ground and flowers from October to December.

== Gallery ==
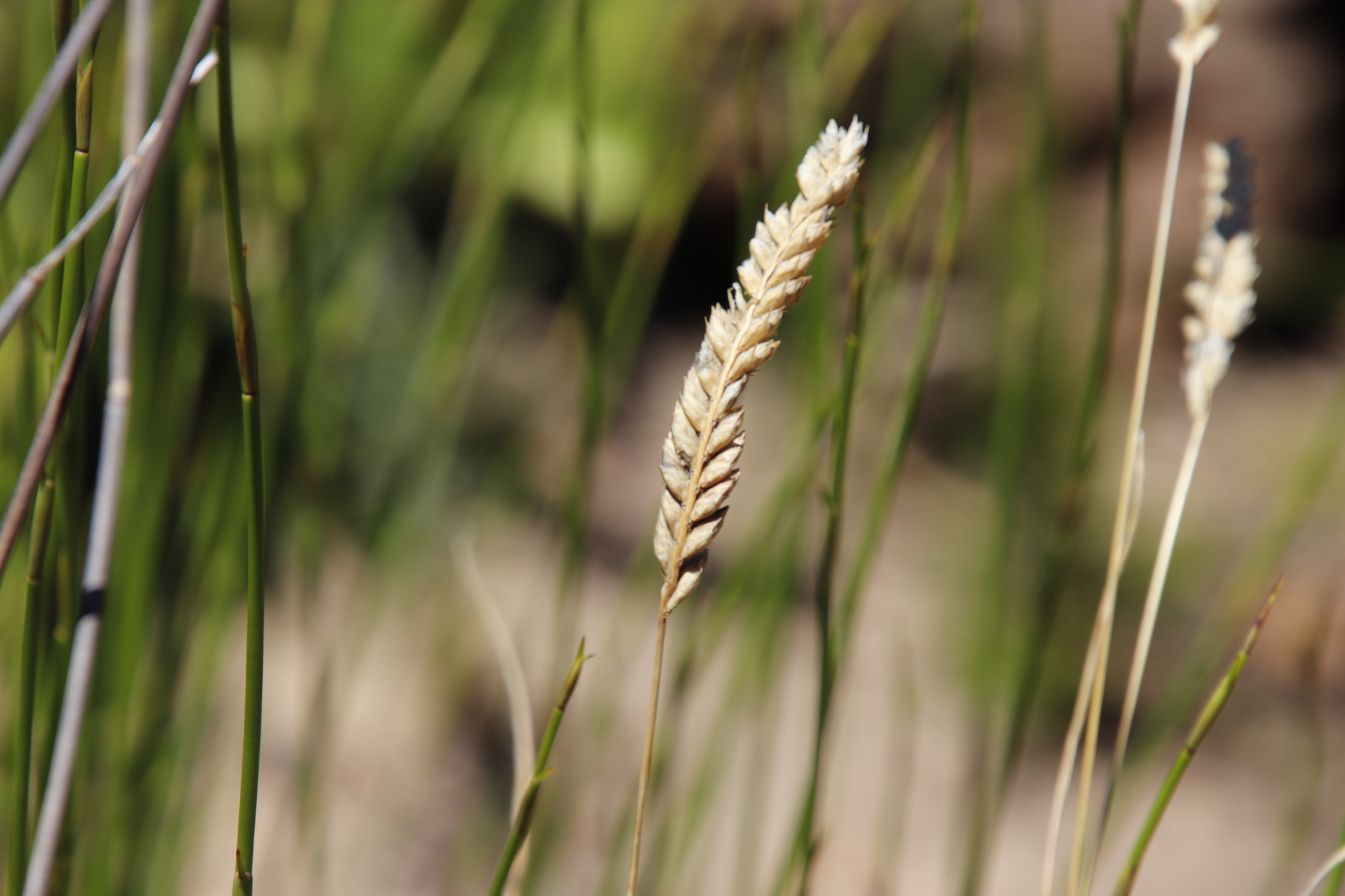

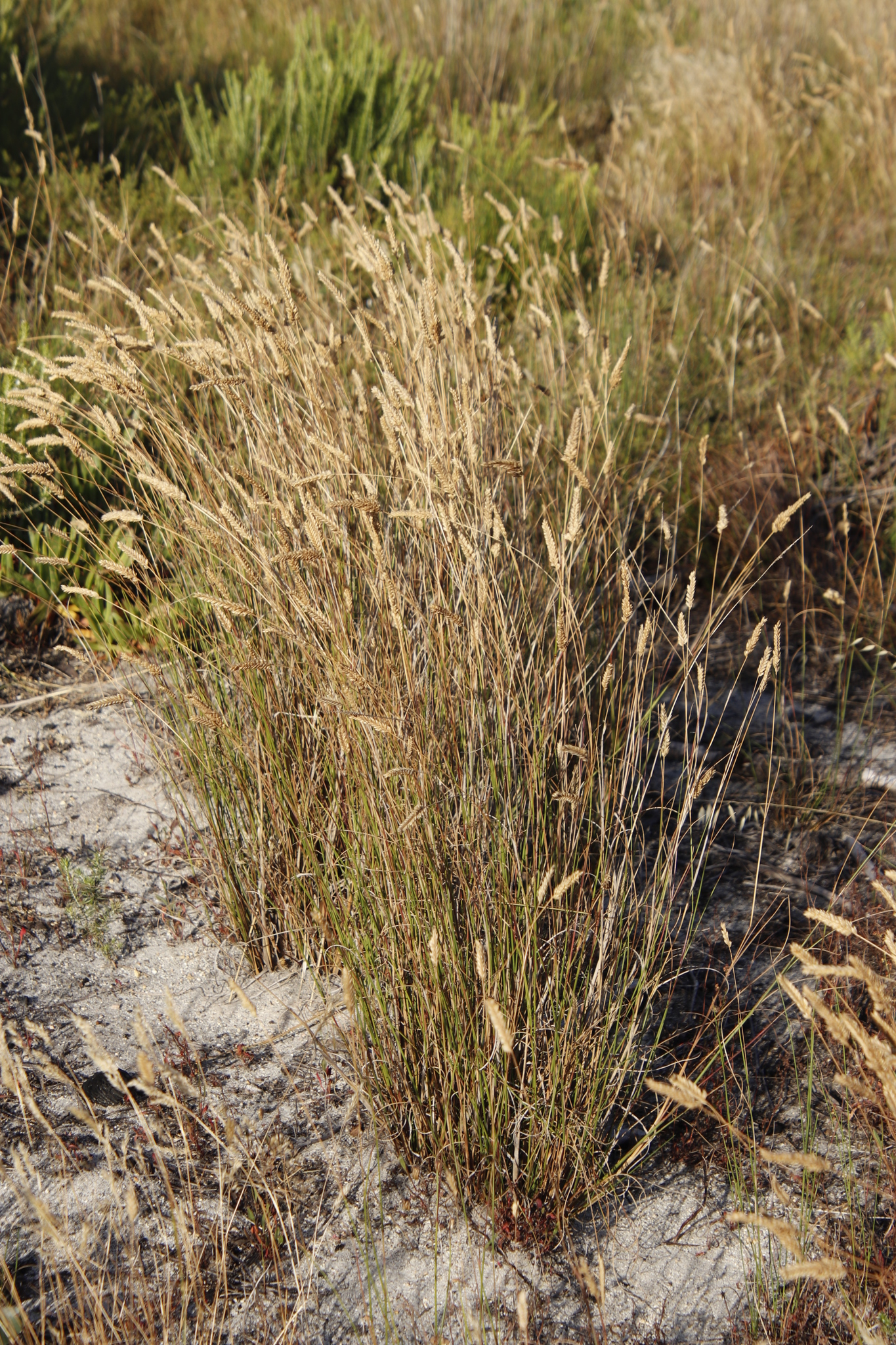

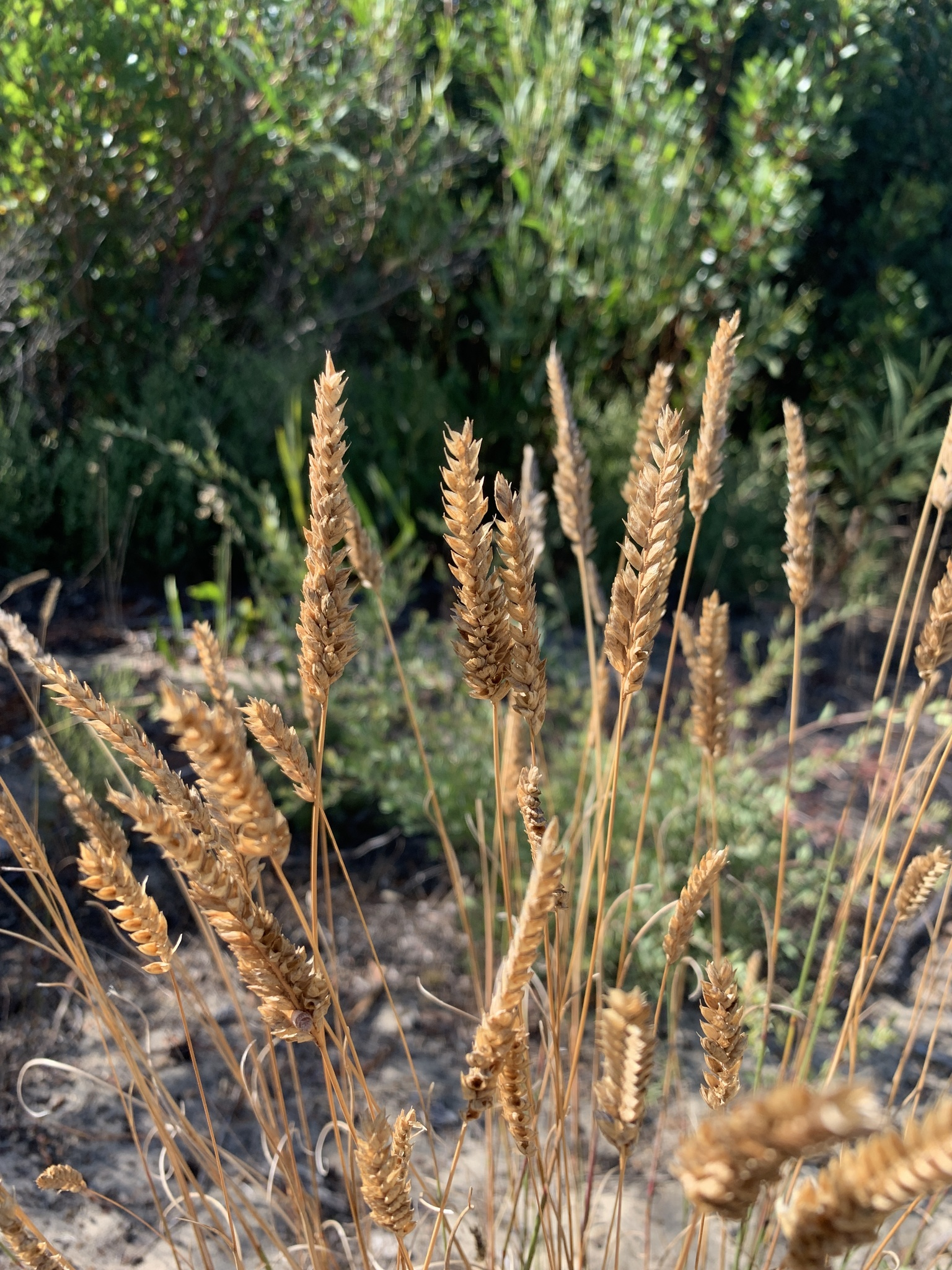
