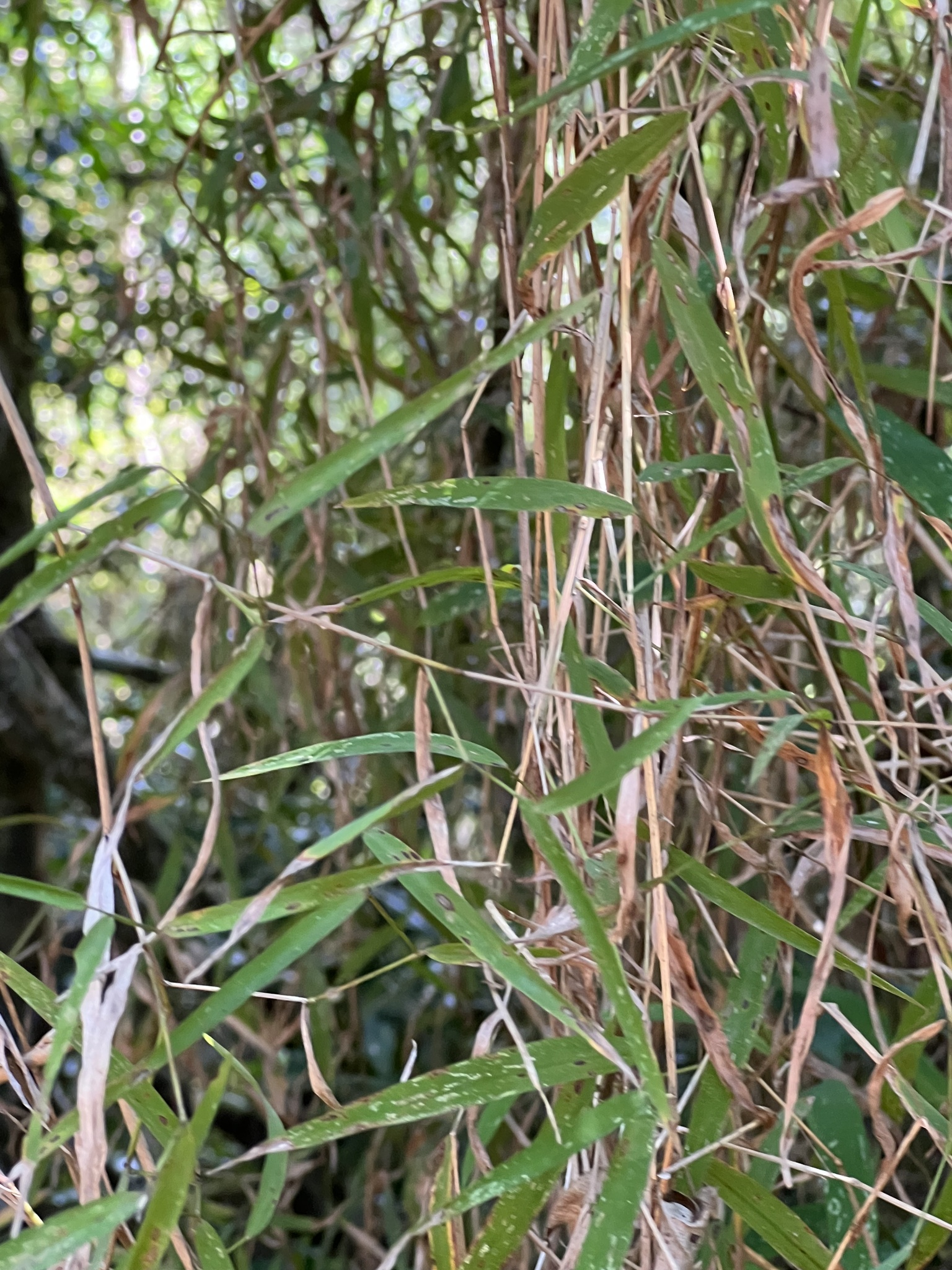

Scientific classification
- Kingdom: Plantae
- Clade: Tracheophytes
- Clade: Angiosperms
- Clade: Monocots
- Clade: Commelinids
- Order: Poales
- Family: Poaceae
- Subfamily: Oryzoideae
- Tribe: Oryzeae
- Subtribe: Oryzinae
- Genus: Prosphytochloa; Schweick.
- Species: P. prehensilis

Binomial name
- Prosphytochloa prehensilis (Nees) Schweick.

Synonyms
- Maltebrunia prehensilis Nees; Oryza prehensilis (Nees) Steud.; Potamophila prehensilis (Nees) Benth.

= Prosphytochloa =

Genus of plants

Prosphytochloa is a genus of African plants in the grass family. The only known species is Prosphytochloa prehensilis, native to Eastern Cape Province, KwaZulu-Natal, Eswatini, Mpumalanga, and Limpopo.
