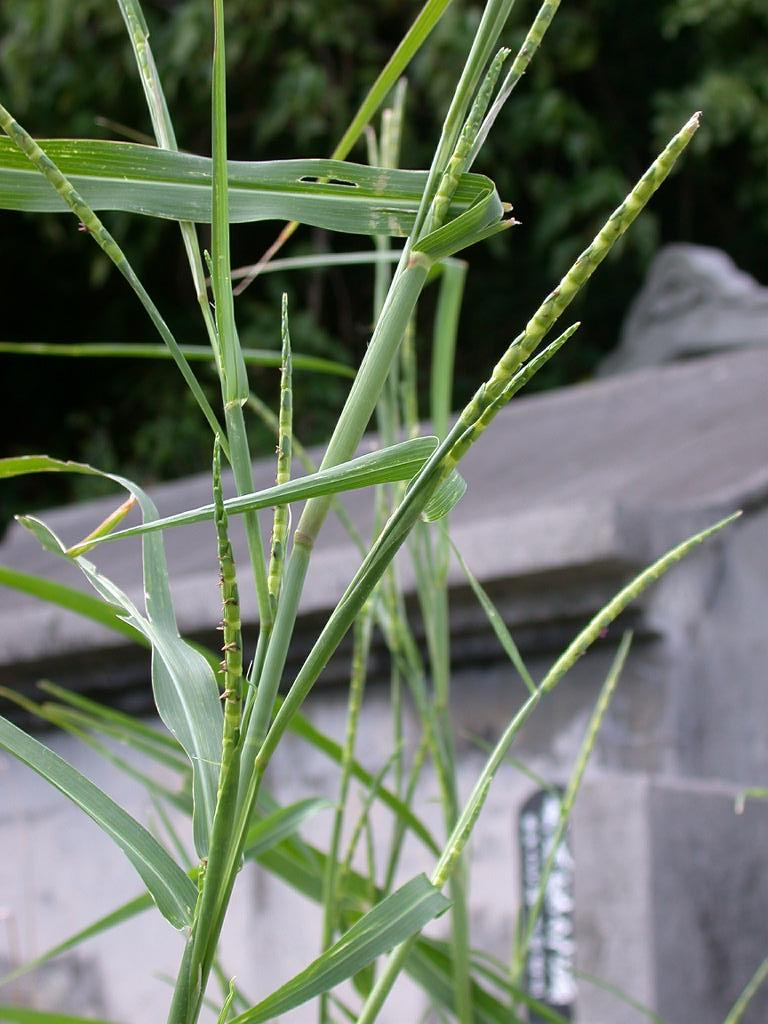
- Rottboellia cochinchinensis

Scientific classification
- Kingdom: Plantae
- Clade: Tracheophytes
- Clade: Angiosperms
- Clade: Monocots
- Clade: Commelinids
- Order: Poales
- Family: Poaceae
- Subfamily: Panicoideae
- Supertribe: Andropogonodae
- Tribe: Andropogoneae
- Subtribe: Rottboelliinae
- Genus: Rottboellia; L.f. 1782 not Host 1801 nor Rottboelia Scop. 1777

Type species
- Rottboellia exaltata L.f.

Synonyms
- Cymbachne Retz.; Robynsiochloa Jacq.-Fél.; Stegosia Lour.

= Rottboellia =

Itch grass

Genus of grasses

Rottboellia (commonly called itch grass) is a genus of African, Asian, and Australian plants in the grass family.

The genus was named in honour of Danish botanist Christen Friis Rottbøll (1727-1797).

== Species ==
24 species are accepted.

- Rottboellia afraurita Stapf – tropical Africa
- Rottboellia aurita Steud. – southeastern Mexico, Central America, northern South America, and central Brazil and Bolivia to northeastern Argentina
- Rottboellia balansae Hack. – Bolivia, west-central Brazil, Paraguay, and northeastern Argentina
- Rottboellia campestris Nutt. – central and southeastern United States
- Rottboellia cancellata Ridl. – Bangka, Peninsular Malaysia, Thailand, and Vietnam
- Rottboellia clarkei Hack. – India and Myanmar
- Rottboellia cochinchinensis (Lour.) Clayton - Africa, Asia, Australia
- Rottboellia coelorachis G.Forst. - New Caledonia, Vanuatu
- Rottboellia geminata Hack. – Thailand, Peninsular Malaysia, and southeastern Borneo
- Rottboellia glandulosa Trin. – Indochina, Malesia, and New Guinea
- Rottboellia goalparensis Bor - Assam
- Rottboellia helferi Hook.f. – Indochina and Peninsular Malaysia
- Rottboellia impressa Griseb. – western Cuba
- Rottboellia laevispica Keng - Anhui, Jiangsu
- Rottboellia lepidura (Stapf) Pilg. – Kenya, Tanzania, and Mozambique
- Rottboellia paradoxa de Koning & Sosef - Philippines
- Rottboellia parodiana (Henrard) Burkart – Paraguay and northeastern Argentina
- Rottboellia purpurascens Robyns - tropical Africa
- Rottboellia rottboellioides (R.Br.) Druce – Philippines, New Guinea, and northern and eastern Australia
- Rottboellia rugosa Nutt. – south-central and southeastern United States from Texas to New Jersey
- Rottboellia selloana Hack. – southern Brazil, northeastern Argentina, Paraguay, and Uruguay
- Rottboellia striata Nees ex Steud. – central Himalayas to Indochina and south-central China
- Rottboellia tessellata Steud. – southeastern United States, from Louisiana to Florida and Georgia
- Rottboellia tuberculosa (Nash) Hitchc. – Cuba and southeastern United States (Alabama, Florida, and Georgia)

Formerly included

Numerous species now considered better suited to other genera: Chasmopodium, Coelorachis, Elionurus, Eremochloa, Festuca, Glyphochloa, Hainardia, Hemarthria, Henrardia, Heteropholis, Ischaemum, Lasiurus, Lolium, Loxodera, Manisuris, Mnesithea, Muhlenbergia, Ophiuros, Oropetium, Parapholis, Phacelurus, Pholiurus, Ratzeburgia, Rhytachne, Schizachyrium, Spartina, Stenotaphrum, Thaumastochloa, Urelytrum and Xerochloa.
