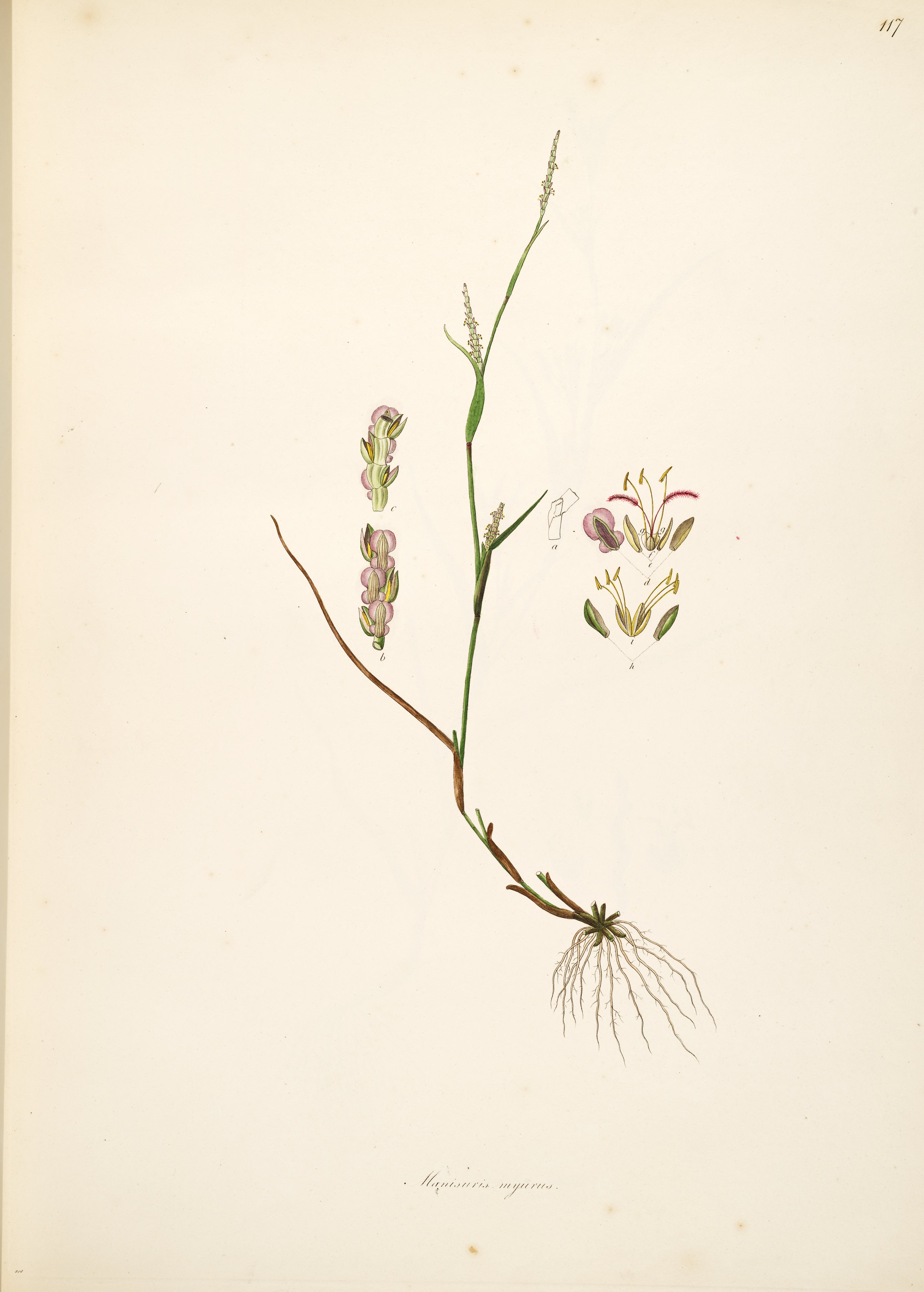
- Manisuris myurus

Scientific classification
- Kingdom: Plantae
- Clade: Tracheophytes
- Clade: Angiosperms
- Clade: Monocots
- Clade: Commelinids
- Order: Poales
- Family: Poaceae
- Subfamily: Panicoideae
- Supertribe: Andropogonodae
- Tribe: Andropogoneae
- Subtribe: Rottboelliinae
- Genus: Manisuris; L.
- Species: M. myurus

Binomial name
- Manisuris myurus L.

Synonyms
- Peltophorus Desv.; Peltophorus myurus (L.) Desv.; Tripsacum myurus (L.) Raspail; Rottboellia myurus (L.) Benth.; Ischaemum myurus Munro

= Manisuris =

Genus of grasses

Manisuris is a genus of Indian plants in the grass family. The only known species is Manisuris myurus, native to Tamil Nadu in Southern India.

== Formerly included species ==
Numerous species are now regarded as better suited in other genera, including Chasmopodium, Coelorachis, Glyphochloa, Hackelochloa, Hemarthria, Heteropholis, Lasiurus, Mnesithea, Phacelurus, Rhytachne, and Rottboellia. These species include:

- Manisuris exaltata, valid as Rottboellia cochinchinensis
