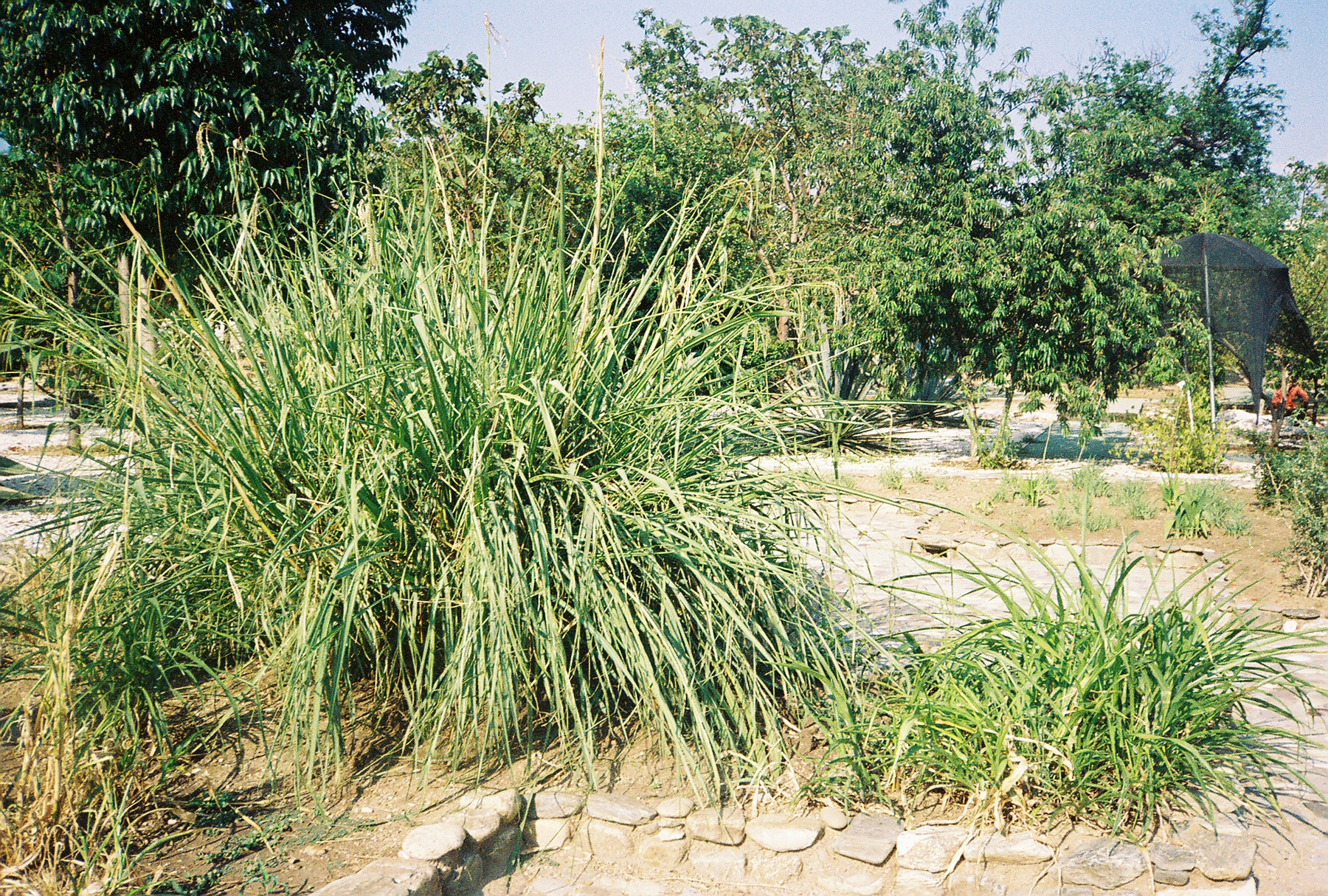
- Tripsacum grass

Scientific classification
- Kingdom: Plantae
- Clade: Tracheophytes
- Clade: Angiosperms
- Clade: Monocots
- Clade: Commelinids
- Order: Poales
- Family: Poaceae
- Subfamily: Panicoideae
- Supertribe: Andropogonodae
- Tribe: Andropogoneae
- Subtribe: Tripsacinae
- Genus: Tripsacum; L.

Type species
- Tripsacum dactyloides (L.) L.

Synonyms
- Digitaria Adans. 1763, illegitimate homonym not Heist. ex Fabr. 1759; Dactylodes Zanoni-Monti ex Kuntze

= Tripsacum =

Genus of grasses

Tripsacum (adjective tripsacoid) is a genus of plants in the grass family and native to the Western Hemisphere. Gamagrass is a common name for plants in this genus.

== Species ==
References:

- Tripsacum andersonii - from Veracruz to Bolivia
- Tripsacum australe - South America
- Tripsacum cundinamarce - Colombia
- Tripsacum dactyloides - widespread in Latin America, West Indies, eastern USA
- Tripsacum intermedium - Guerrero, Chiapas, Guatemala, Honduras
- Tripsacum jalapense - Oaxaca, Chiapas, Guatemala, El Salvador
- Tripsacum lanceolatum - USA (AZ NM), Mexico, Central America
- Tripsacum latifolium - Mesoamerica, West Indies
- Tripsacum laxum - Latin America, West Indies
- Tripsacum maizar - Mexico, Guatemala
- Tripsacum manisuroides - Chiapas
- Tripsacum peruvianum - Peru, Ecuador
- Tripsacum pilosum - Peru, Ecuador
- Tripsacum zopilotense - Mexico, Guatemala

== Formerly included ==
See Anthephora; Apluda; Chionachne; Coelorachis; Elionurus; Hackelochloa; Hemarthria; Ischaemum; Lasiurus; Manisuris; Microstegium; Pogonatherum

- Tripsacum aegilopoides - Lasiurus scindicus
- Tripsacum aristatum - Ischaemum aristatum
- Tripsacum ciliare - Elionurus ciliaris
- Tripsacum compressum - Hemarthria compressa
- Tripsacum cylindricum - Mnesithea cylindrica
- Tripsacum distachyum - Ischaemum rugosum
- Tripsacum distichum - Ischaemum rugosum
- Tripsacum fasciculatum - Microstegium fasciculatum
- Tripsacum giganteum - Apluda mutica
- Tripsacum granulare - Hackelochloa granularis
- Tripsacum hermaphroditum - Anthephora hermaphrodita
- Tripsacum hirsutum - Lasiurus scindicus
- Tripsacum ischaemum - Ischaemum muticum
- Tripsacum muticum - Ischaemum muticum
- Tripsacum myurus - Manisuris myurus
- Tripsacum paniceum - Pogonatherum paniceum
- Tripsacum pubescens - Anthephora pubescens
- Tripsacum semiteres - Chionachne semiteres
