= Ophiuros =

Scientific classification
- Kingdom: Plantae
- Clade: Tracheophytes
- Clade: Angiosperms
- Clade: Monocots
- Clade: Commelinids
- Order: Poales
- Family: Poaceae
- Subfamily: Panicoideae
- Supertribe: Andropogonodae
- Tribe: Andropogoneae
- Subtribe: Rottboelliinae
- Genus: Ophiuros; C.F.Gaertn.

Synonyms
- Rottboellia subg. Ophiuros (C.F. Gaertn.) Hack.; Ophiurus R.Br.

Genus of grasses

Ophiuros is a genus of Asia, Australian, and East African plants in the grass family.

species

- Ophiuros bombaiensis Bor - Tamil Nadu, Maharashtra
- Ophiuros exaltatus (L.) Kuntze - Indian subcontinent, southern China, Southeast Asia, Ryukyu Islands, New Guinea, Australia
- Ophiuros megaphyllus Stapf ex Haines - eastern India, Bangladesh, Bhutan, Myanmar, Thailand
- Ophiuros papillosus Hochst. - Eritrea, Ethiopia, Sudan

formerly included

see Coelorachis Hainardia Lepturus Mnesithea Parapholis Pholiurus Ratzeburgia Rhytachne Rottboellia Thaumastochloa

- Ophiuros appendiculatus - Rottboellia cochinchinensis
- Ophiuros auriculatus - Ratzeburgia pulcherrima
- Ophiuros cochinchinensis - Mnesithea laevis var. cochinchinensis
- Ophiuros compressus - Parapholis filiformis
- Ophiuros cylindricus - Hainardia cylindrica
- Ophiuros erectus - Parapholis filiformis
- Ophiuros filiformis - Parapholis filiformis
- Ophiuros gracilis - Parapholis filiformis
- Ophiuros incurvatus - Parapholis incurva
- Ophiuros laevis - Mnesithea laevis
- Ophiuros loricatus - Rhytachne rottboellioides
- Ophiuros monostachyus - Mnesithea laevis var. cochinchinensis
- Ophiuros muricatulus - Coelorachis glandulosa
- Ophiuros pannonicus - Pholiurus pannonicus
- Ophiuros perforatus - Mnesithea laevis
- Ophiuros plicatus - Rhytachne rottboellioides
- Ophiuros pollockii - Thaumastochloa pubescens
- Ophiuros pubescens - Thaumastochloa pubescens
- Ophiuros radicans - Lepturus radicans
- Ophiuros shimadanus - Mnesithea laevis var. chenii
- Ophiuros subulatus - Hainardia cylindrica
- Ophiuros undatus - Mnesithea laevis var. cochinchinensis
- Ophiuros undulatus - Mnesithea laevis var. cochinchinensis
