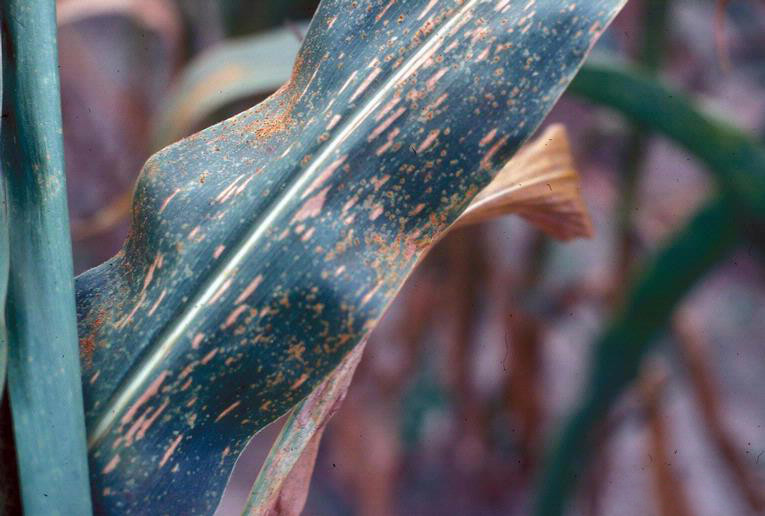

Scientific classification
- Kingdom: Fungi
- Division: Basidiomycota
- Class: Pucciniomycetes
- Order: Pucciniales
- Family: Pucciniaceae
- Genus: Puccinia
- Species: P. sorghi

Binomial name
- Puccinia sorghi Schwein. 1832

Synonyms
- Dicaeoma sorghi (Schwein.) Kuntze 1898; Puccinia maydis Berenger 1844; Puccinia zeae Berenger (1851)

= Puccinia sorghi =

Common rust of maize/corn fungal disease

Puccinia sorghi, or common rust of maize, is a species of rust fungus that infects corn and species from the plant genus Oxalis.

== Host and symptoms ==
Puccinia sorghi often first appears after silking in maize. The first early symptom includes chlorotic specks on the leaf. The obvious sign of this plant pathogen is golden-brown pustules or bumps on the above-ground surface of the plant tissue. These bumps are urediniospores which can spread to other plants and cause further infection. They are circular and powdery, which result from spores breaking through the leaf surface. While they are only about 1–2 mm each, they are very numerous with equal frequencies on upper and lower leaf surfaces. Over time, these blister-like bumps can change from brown to black, changing from urediniospores to teliospores. The most common place to find these spores is on the plant leaf, but they can develop on husks, tassels, and stalks as well. P. sorghi has two hosts making it a heteroecious rust. Maize and Oxalis are the two hosts for P. sorghi. In comparison, the other common type of maize rust is southern corn rust (Puccinia polysora) and it has a higher variety of hosts including maize, silver plumegrass, eastern gamagrass, Tripsacum lanceolatum, T. laxum, and T. pilorum.

== Disease cycle ==
There are five spore stages in P. sorghi. The spore types are teliospores, basidiospores, pycniospores, aeciospores, and urediniospores. Every year, viable urediniospores must travel to the north from the warmer southern climate. Since P. sorghi is an obligate parasite, it requires living plant tissue in order to survive. Therefore, this disease cannot overwinter in northern US states. The severity of the disease depends largely on weather conditions and how many spores are carried north each season. Urediniospores infect leaves and produce more spores to create a secondary inoculum and polycyclic disease cycle. Once the urediniospores mature on the plant tissue and turn black they become teliospores. Urediniospores measure 22-33 × 20-28 μm. Teliospores are two-celled and measure 27-53 μm. Teliospores overwinter in the southern climate and germinate in the spring. Teliospores produce basidiospores which spread by wind to infect Oxalis. They infect Oxalis and produce sexual spores (pycniospores) and aeciospores. Aeciospores are windblown to maize and infect the plant.

== Management ==
The use of resistant maize hybrids is the best way to manage P. sorghi. There are two types of resistance that exist. The first is partial resistance which results in fewer rust spots by reducing germination rate. This type of resistance makes P. sorghi less severe by slowing down development of number of urediniospores. The other type of resistance is qualitative. This type relies on a single gene which provides total resistance to the plant. Other management tactics include foliar application of fungicide and cultural control. For fungicide application, plants should be monitored throughout the season, spraying when there are six or more pustules per leaf. Fungicide groups that can be used include mixed modes of action, DMI Triazoles (Group 3), and QoI Strobilurins (Group 11). Cultural control can be more effective in areas where the spores can overwinter. Debris should be collected and destroyed by burning along with eradication of Oxalis in surrounding areas. In northern areas where the spores can't overwinter, early planting time can help avoid P. sorghi. Younger leaves are more susceptible to infection, by planting earlier the crop will be more mature and more resilient by the time the spores arrive.
