= Dactylispa flava =

Scientific classification
- Kingdom: Animalia
- Phylum: Arthropoda
- Class: Insecta
- Order: Coleoptera
- Suborder: Polyphaga
- Infraorder: Cucujiformia
- Family: Chrysomelidae
- Genus: Dactylispa
- Species: D. flava

Binomial name
- Dactylispa flava Achard, 1917

Species of beetle

Dactylispa flava is a species of beetle of the family Chrysomelidae. It is found in Congo, Sierra Leone and Togo.

== Life history ==
The recorded host plants for this species are Phoenix reclinata, Loudetia and Urelytrum species.
