= Dactylispa spinosa =

Scientific classification
- Kingdom: Animalia
- Phylum: Arthropoda
- Clade: Pancrustacea
- Class: Insecta
- Order: Coleoptera
- Suborder: Polyphaga
- Infraorder: Cucujiformia
- Family: Chrysomelidae
- Genus: Dactylispa
- Species: D. spinosa

Binomial name
- Dactylispa spinosa (Weber, 1801)

Synonyms
- Hispa spinosa Weber, 1801; Hispa discoidalis Chapuis, 1877; Hispa nigripennis Ritsema, 1887 (not Motschulsky, 1861); Hispa cariana Gestro, 1890; Dactylispa sumatrana Weise, 1911; Dactylispa variabilis Maulik, 1919; Dactylispa tonkinea Uhmann, 1930; Hispa balyi Gestro, 1890

Species of beetle

Dactylispa spinosa is a species of beetle of the family Chrysomelidae. It is found in Bangladesh, China (Fukien, Guangxi, Hainan, Kwangsi, Kwangtung, Yunnan), India (Assam, Sikkim, West Bengal), Indonesia (Borneo, Sulawesi, Java, Sarawak, Sumatra), Laos, Malaysia, Myanmar, Nepal, the Philippines (Palawan), Thailand and Vietnam.

== Life history ==
The recorded host plants for this species are Saccharum officinarum, Panicum palmifolium, Rottboellia exaltata, Zea mays, Imperata cylindrica, Saccharum spontaneum and Phragmites communis.
