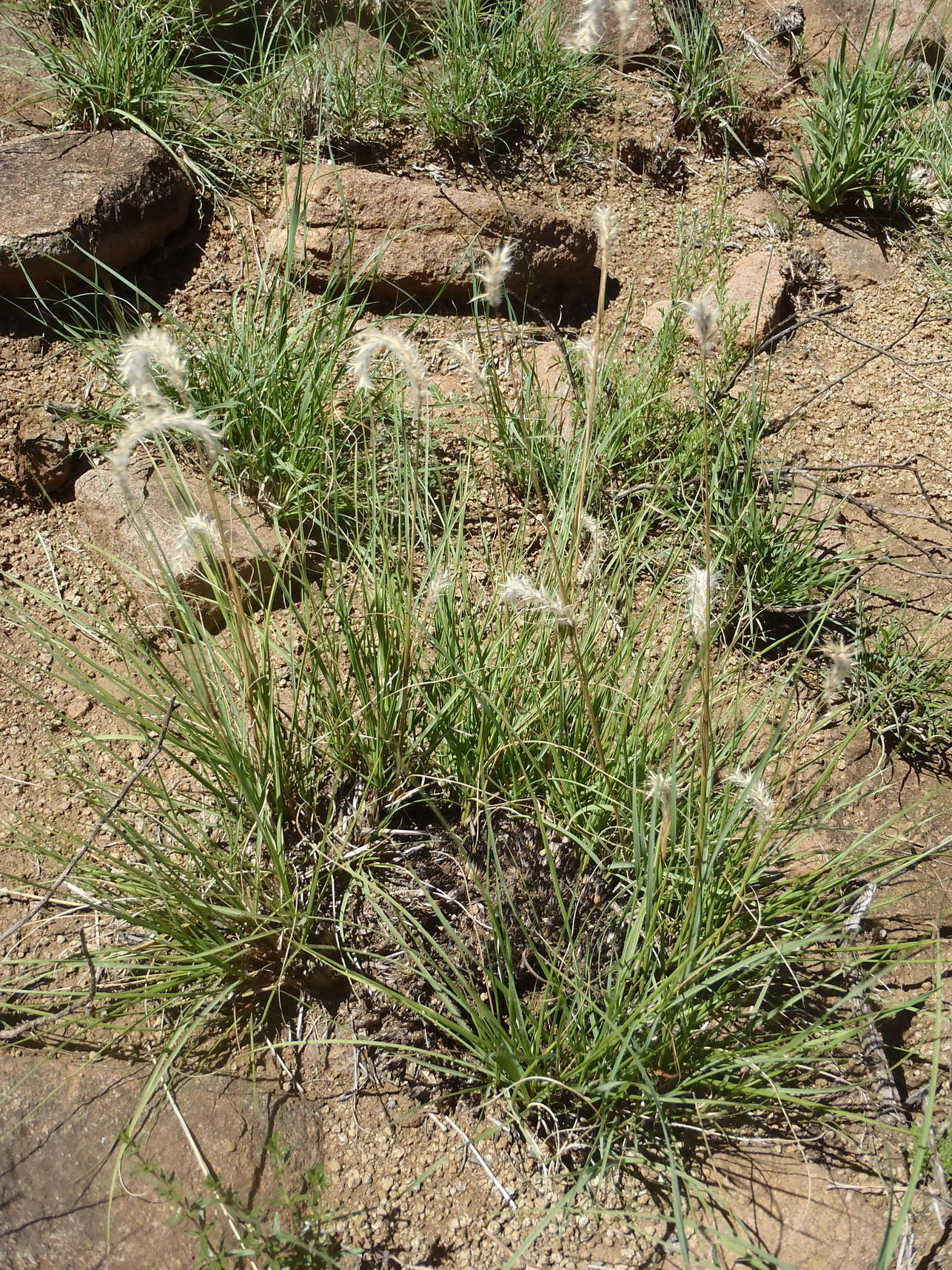
- Elionurus muticus

Scientific classification
- Kingdom: Plantae
- Clade: Tracheophytes
- Clade: Angiosperms
- Clade: Monocots
- Clade: Commelinids
- Order: Poales
- Family: Poaceae
- Subfamily: Panicoideae
- Supertribe: Andropogonodae
- Tribe: Andropogoneae
- Subtribe: Tripsacinae
- Genus: Elionurus; Humb. & Bonpl. ex Willd. not Kunth 1816

Type species
- Elionurus tripsacoides Humb. & Bonpl. ex Willd.

Synonyms
- Elyonurus Humb. & Bonpl. ex Willd.; Callichloea Spreng. ex Steud.; Callichloe H.Pfeiff.

= Elionurus =

Genus of grasses

Elionurus is a genus of Asian, African, Australian, and Neotropical plants in the grass family.

Species

- Elionurus barbiculmis - Mexico, Arizona, Texas, New Mexico
- Elionurus bilinguis - Brazil
- Elionurus ciliaris - Latin America (from Mexico to Paraguay); West Africa
- Elionurus citreus - Australia, New Guinea, Solomon Islands
- Elionurus elegans - West Africa
- Elionurus euchaetus - Ivory Coast, Burkina Faso
- Elionurus hensii - Republic of the Congo, Democratic Republic of the Congo, Angola
- Elionurus hirtifolius - western + central Africa
- Elionurus lividus - Paraguay
- Elionurus muticus - Africa, Yemen, South America
- Elionurus planifolius - South America
- Elionurus platypus - western + central Africa
- Elionurus royleanus - Canary Islands, Cape Verde, Sahara, East Africa, Arabian Peninsula, Iran, Pakistan, India
- Elionurus tripsacoides - Latin America (from Mexico to Paraguay); eastern + southern Africa
- Elionurus tristis - Madagascar

formerly included

see Bothriochloa Lasiurus Loxodera Phacelurus Schizachyrium Urelytrum

- Elionurus agropyroides - Urelytrum agropyroides
- Elionurus dubius - Schizachyrium tenerum
- Elionurus gabonensis - Phacelurus gabonensis
- Elionurus hirsutus - Lasiurus scindicus
- Elionurus ledermannii - Loxodera ledermannii
- Elionurus pertusus - Bothriochloa pertusa
