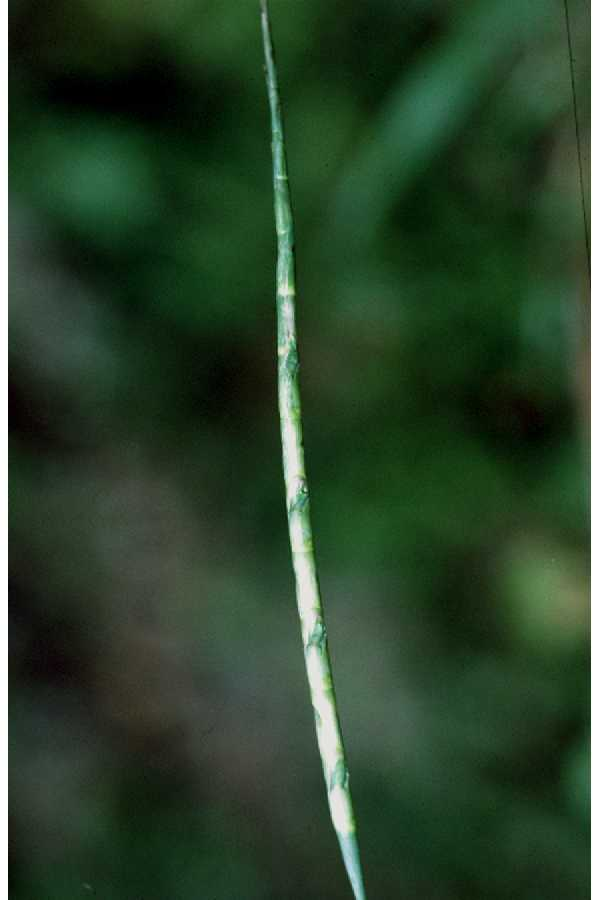
- Coelorachis cylindrica

Scientific classification
- Kingdom: Plantae
- (unranked): Angiosperms
- (unranked): Monocots
- (unranked): Commelinids
- Order: Poales
- Family: Poaceae
- Genus: Coelorachis Brongn.

Type species
- Coelorachis muricata (Retz.) Brongn.

Synonyms
- Rottboellia subg. Coelorhachis (Brongn.) Hack.

= Coelorachis =

Genus of grasses

Coelorachis is a genus of plants in the grass family, widespread across much of Asia, Africa, Australia and the Americas. As of September 2025, its taxonomic status is confused.

== Taxonomy ==
The genus Coelorachis was erected by Adolphe-Théodore Brongniart in 1831. Two misspellings (orthographic variants) have created some confusion. In 1836, Stephan Endlicher used the spelling Coelorhachis. In 1882, Ferdinand von Mueller used the spelling Coelorrhacis.

As of September 2025, sources varied in their treatment of the genus. Some treated it as a synonym of the genus Mnesithea. Others, like the World Flora Online, treated it as a synonym of the genus Rottboellia. Plants of the World Online treated it as a synonym of the genus Eremochloa.

Species

- Coelorachis afraurita (Stapf) Stapf - tropical Africa
- Coelorachis aurita (Steud.) A.Camus - tropical America from Chiapas + Trinidad to Paraguay
- Coelorachis balansae (Hack.) A.Camus - Brazil, Argentina, Uruguay, Paraguay
- Coelorachis cancellata (Ridl.) Bor - Bangka, Pen Malaysia, Thailand, Vietnam
- Coelorachis capensis Stapf - Cape Province, KwaZulu-Natal
- Coelorachis clarkei (Hack.) Blatt. & McCann - India, Myanmar
- Coelorachis cylindrica (Michx.) Nash - southeastern + south-central USA
- Coelorachis geminata (Hack.) Clayton - Pen Malaysia, Thailand, Kalimantan
- Coelorachis glandulosa (Trin.) Stapf ex Ridl. - Southeast Asia, New Guinea, Andaman & Nicobar Islands
- Coelorachis helferi (Hook.f.) Henrard - Pen Malaysia, Indochina
- Coelorachis impressa (Griseb.) Nash - Cuba
- Coelorachis khasiana (Hack.) Stapf ex Bor - Yunnan, Sikkim, Bhutan, Arunachal Pradesh, Myanmar
- Coelorachis lepidura Stapf - Kenya, Tanzania, Mozambique
- Coelorachis parodiana Henrard - Paraguay, Argentina
- Coelorachis ramosa (E.Fourn.) Nash - tropical America from Veracruz to southern Brazil
- Coelorachis rottboellioides (R.Br.) A.Camus - Australia, New Guinea, Philippines, Lesser Sunda Islands
- Coelorachis rugosa (Nutt.) Nash - Cuba; USA from Texas to New Jersey
- Coelorachis selloana (Hack.) A.Camus - Brazil, Argentina, Uruguay, Paraguay
- Coelorachis striata (Steud.) A.Camus - Yunnan, Indochina, eastern Himalayas
- Coelorachis tessellata (Steud.) Nash - USA (Alabama, Florida, Louisiana, Georgia, Mississippi)
- Coelorachis tuberculosa (Nash) Nash - Cuba; USA (Alabama, Florida, Georgia)

formerly included

see Eremochloa Hemarthria Lasiurus Mnesithea Phacelurus Rhytachne Rottboellia

- Coelorachis fasciculata - Phacelurus huillensis
- Coelorachis forsteriana - Rottboellia coelorachis
- Coelorachis hirsuta - Lasiurus scindicus
- Coelorachis laevispica - Rottboellia laevispica
- Coelorachis loricata - Rhytachne rottboellioides
- Coelorachis mollicoma - Mnesithea mollicoma
- Coelorachis muricata - Eremochloa muricata
- Coelorachis pratensis - Hemarthria pratensis
- Coelorachis undulatifolia - Phacelurus huillensis
