= Rottboellia exaltata =

Rottboellia exaltata can refer to the following grass species:

- Rottboellia exaltata (L.) Naezén, a synonym of Ophiuros exaltatus (L.) Kuntze
- Rottboellia exaltata L.f., a synonym of Rottboellia cochinchinensis (Lour.) Clayton
