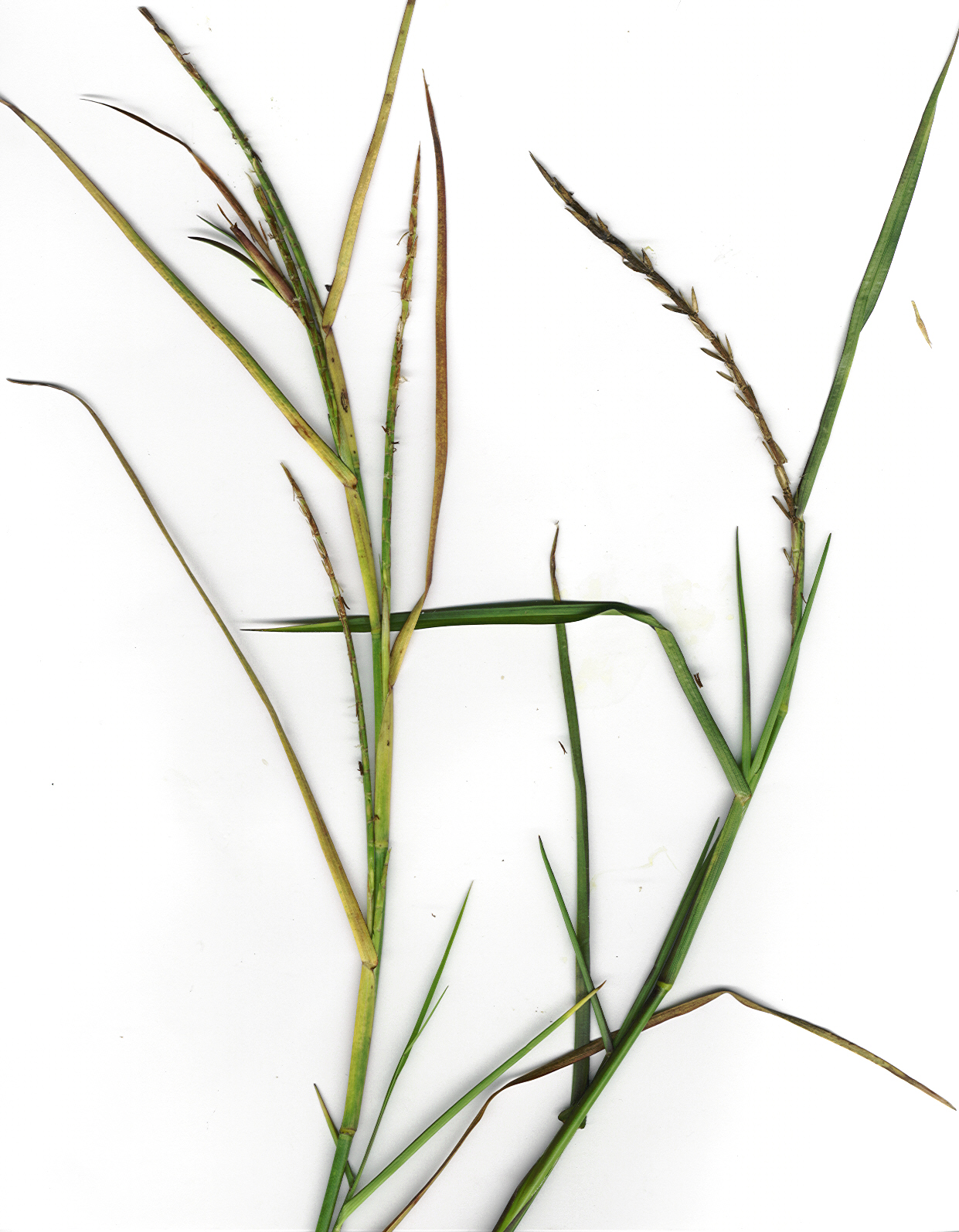
- Close-up of specimen
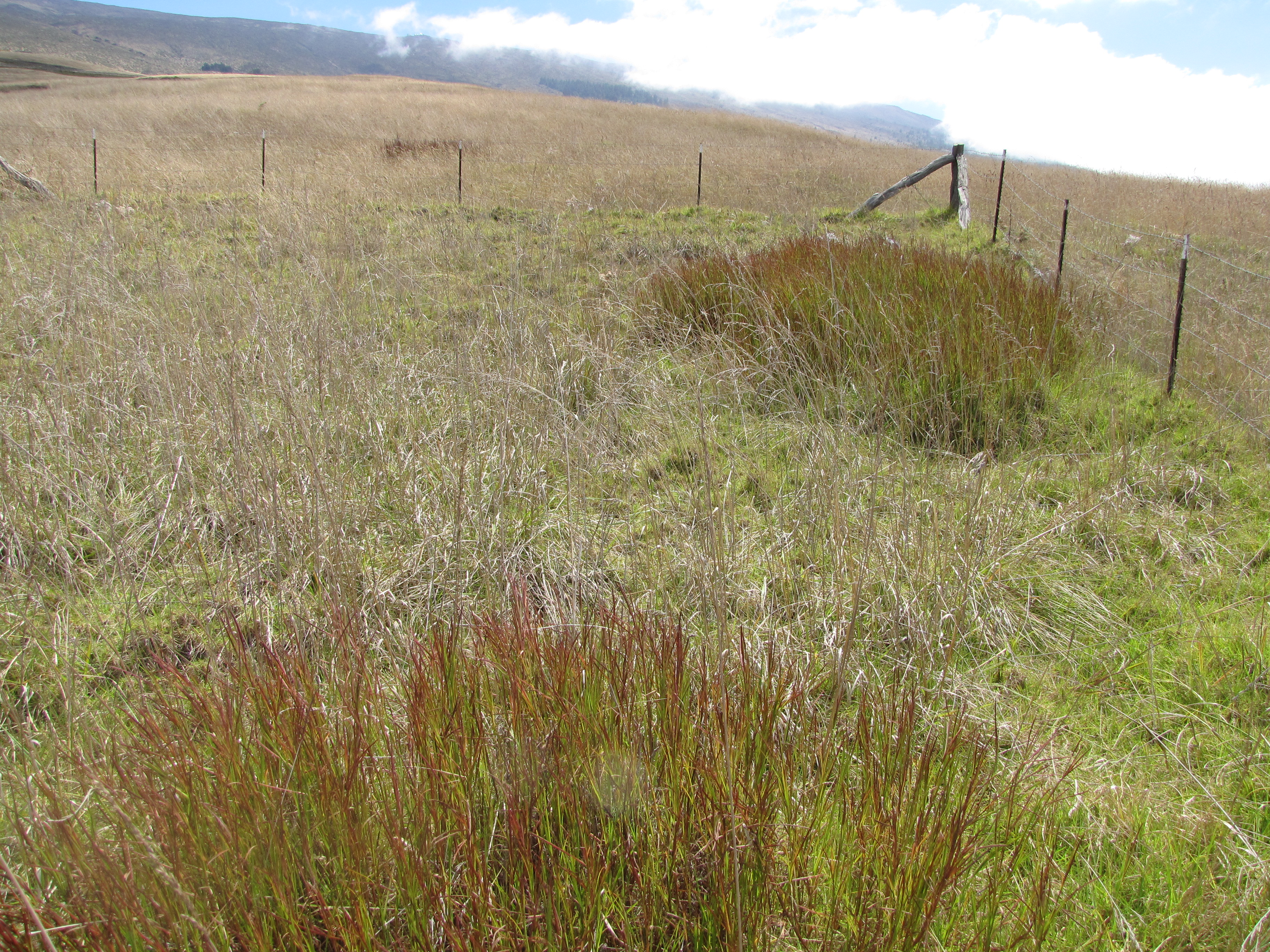
- Patches of Hemarthria altissima in a pasture in Hawaii

Scientific classification
- Kingdom: Plantae
- Clade: Tracheophytes
- Clade: Angiosperms
- Clade: Monocots
- Clade: Commelinids
- Order: Poales
- Family: Poaceae
- Subfamily: Panicoideae
- Genus: Hemarthria
- Species: H. altissima

Binomial name
- Hemarthria altissima (Poir.) Stapf & C.E.Hubb.

Synonyms
- List: Andropogon altissimus (Poir.) Raspail; Andropogon fasciculatus Raspail; Hemarthria capensis Trin.; Hemarthria caudiculata Steud.; Hemarthria compressa var. fasciculata (Hack.) Keng; Hemarthria fasciculata Kunth; Hemarthria guyanensis Steud.; Lepturus fasciculatus Trin.; Lodicularia capensis (Trin.) Nees; Lodicularia fasciculata P.Beauv.; Manisuris altissima (Poir.) Hitchc.; Manisuris fasciculata (Hack.) Hitchc.; Rottboellia altissima Poir.; Rottboellia articulata Thunb. ex Roem. & Schult.; Rottboellia fasciculata Lam.; Rottboellia heterochroa Gand.; Rottboellia spathacea Ten.

= Hemarthria altissima =

Species of flowering plant

Hemarthria altissima, variously called limpo grass, limpograss, halt grass, Batavian quick grass, swamp couch grass, red swamp grass and red vleigrass, is a species of flowering plant in the jointgrass genus Hemarthria, family Poaceae. It is native to the Old World Tropics and Subtropics; Africa, Southern Europe, the Middle East, India, Southeast Asia, eastern China, and Borneo, and widely introduced as a forage in the New World, from Texas and Florida south to northern Argentina. In addition to being a valued forage for livestock, it makes a good, fragrant silage. A number of cultivars are commercially available.
