= Tripsacum australe =

Scientific classification
- Kingdom: Plantae
- Clade: Tracheophytes
- Clade: Angiosperms
- Clade: Monocots
- Clade: Commelinids
- Order: Poales
- Family: Poaceae
- Subfamily: Panicoideae
- Genus: Tripsacum
- Species: T. australe

Binomial name
- Tripsacum australe (H.C.Cutler & E.S.Anderson, 1941)

Species of flowering plant

Tripsacum australe is a species of grass in the family Poaceae. It is a perennial or rhizomatous geophyte which grows primarily in the wet tropical biome and is endemic to South America. Some common Spanish names for this species, according to Universidad Nacional de Columbia, include 'arroz silvestre', 'cañarote', and 'gramalote'.

== Distribution ==
T. australe is native to Bolivia, North Brazil, Central-West Brazil, Colombia, French Guiana, Guyana, Paraguay, Peru, Suriname, Trinidad-Tobago, and Venezuela.

== Genetics ==
The two known varieties of T. australe are diploid (2n = 36). Both varieties can cross and produce fertile hybrids with each other. These two varieties have also been crossed with Tripsacum dactyloides var. meridonale (2n = 36) these hybrids are partially sterile.

The varieties are:

- Tripsacum australe var. hirsutum
- Tripsacum australe var. australe
