= Suddia =

Scientific classification
- Kingdom: Plantae
- Clade: Tracheophytes
- Clade: Angiosperms
- Clade: Monocots
- Clade: Commelinids
- Order: Poales
- Family: Poaceae
- Subfamily: Oryzoideae
- Tribe: incertae sedis
- Genus: Suddia; Renvoize
- Species: S. sagittifolia

Binomial name
- Suddia sagittifolia Renvoize

Genus of grasses

Suddia is a genus of plants in the grass family. The only known species is Suddia sagittifolia, which is native to South Sudan in central Africa. It has been first described by the English Botanist Stephen Andrew Renvoize in 1984.

== Description ==
Suddia sagittifolia grows perennial from elongated rhizomes, from which 140-300 cm long culms emerge. These are upright and its tissues has internal air-filled spaces. The stem sections can be distinguished by nodes and internodes with the later being circular when looked at in a cross-section view. The ligule is membranous and smooth-edged. Leaves are lanceolate and have a pseudo petiole. Leaf blade venation is extending outward diagonally from the midrib and shows distinct cross veins.

When flowering, Suddia develops an inflorescence in form of a panicle, with primary branches whorled at lower nodes. Spikelets are ovate, laterally compressed and comprises one fertile floret. Glumes are very reduced or absent. Lemma is ovate, membranous, without wings and has five veins, which are laterally prominent and ribbed. The lemma apex comes to a sharp point. The palea is also showing five veins. Contained within are the floral organs, unusual for Poaceae four anthers are present.

== Ecology & Distribution ==
The species has only been found in swamps in the Sudd (South Sudan) and around Lake Kyoga (Uganda). It grows along riversides and river channels in mosaic stands in seasonally flooded swamp areas. Along riversides only few individuals were seen in association with large stands of Cyperus papyrus. On the landward facing side of the swamp larger and more individuals were found in patches of Vossia cuspidata, Cypers papyrus and Typha domingensis. Due to the inaccessibility of the habitat exact distribution is not known.
