= Chasmopodium afzelii =

Scientific classification
- Kingdom: Plantae
- Clade: Tracheophytes
- Clade: Angiosperms
- Clade: Monocots
- Clade: Commelinids
- Order: Poales
- Family: Poaceae
- Subfamily: Panicoideae
- Genus: Chasmopodium
- Species: C. afzelii

Binomial name
- Chasmopodium afzelii (Hack.) Stapf

Synonyms
- Manisuris afzelii (Hack.) Kuntze; Rottboellia afzelii Hack.

Species of grass

Chasmopodium afzelii is a species of swamp grass native to Sierra Leone and Togo. It grows with 2–4 m (6 ft 7 in – 13 ft 1 in) tall stalks, and with 25–50 cm (9.8–19.7 in) long smooth leaves.
