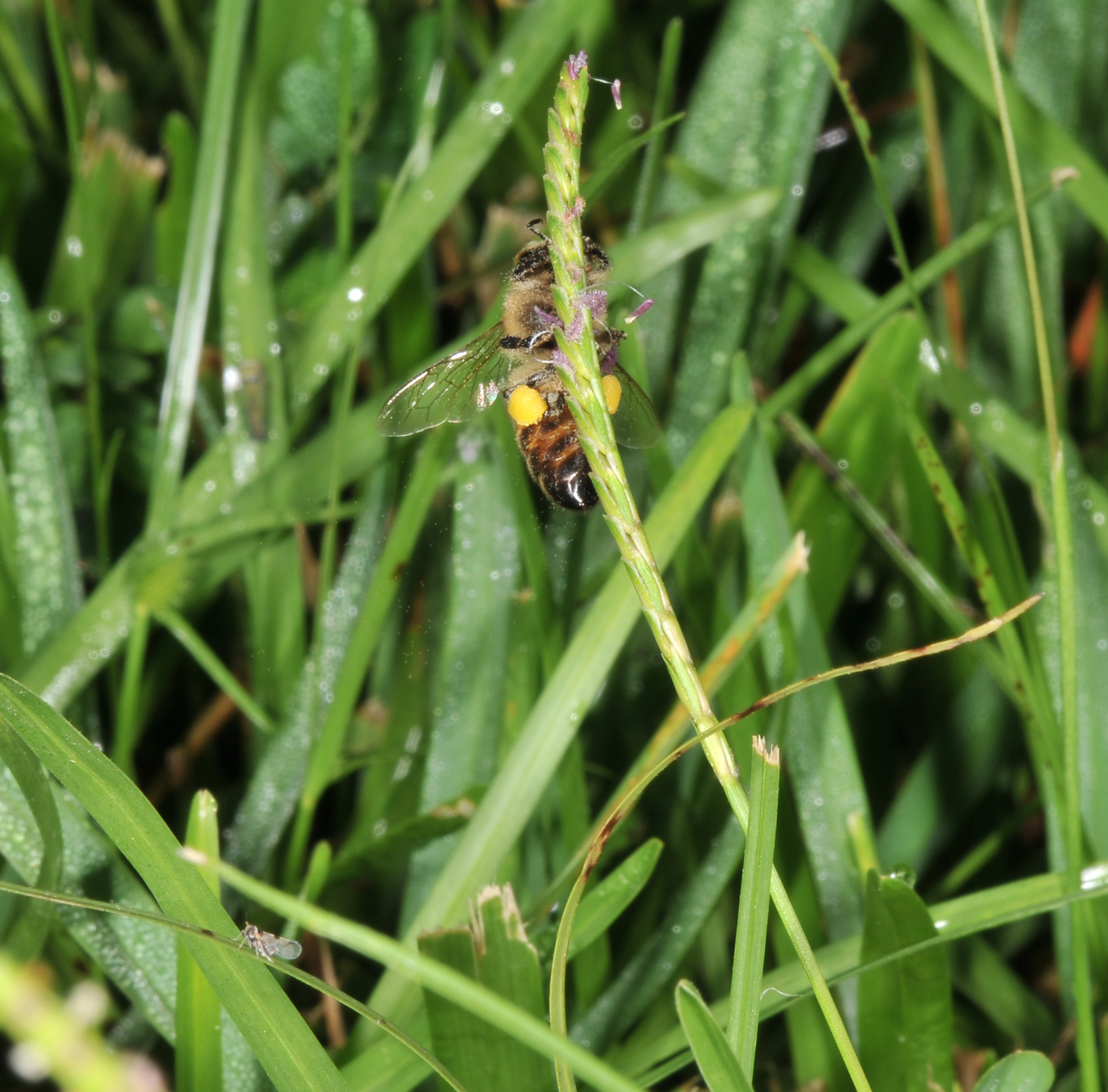

Scientific classification
- Kingdom: Plantae
- Clade: Tracheophytes
- Clade: Angiosperms
- Clade: Monocots
- Clade: Commelinids
- Order: Poales
- Family: Poaceae
- Subfamily: Panicoideae
- Genus: Eremochloa
- Species: E. ophiuroides

Binomial name
- Eremochloa ophiuroides (Munro) Hack.

= Eremochloa ophiuroides =

Species of plant

Eremochloa ophiuroides, or Centipedegrass, is a species of grass in the family Poaceae. Used as a warm season lawn grass, it forms thick sods and spreads by stolons.

== Overview ==
The grass is medium to light green in color and has a coarse texture with short upright seedhead stems that grow to about 3 to 5 inches (7.6 to 12.7 cm). Native to Southern China, it was introduced to the United States in 1916 and has since become one of the common grasses in the Southeastern United States and Hawaii. It can also be considered a weed in areas where other vegetation is desired.

== Cultivation ==
Centipedegrass is a low maintenance grass as it requires infrequent mowing and has low fertilization requirements. Centipedegrass has medium shade tolerance and limited traffic tolerance.

It is shallow rooted and has poor drought tolerance. Centipedegrass survives in mild climates without several hard freezes. With light freezes it will turn brown but recover and re-green as the temperature rises. It does well in sandy and acidic soils.
