= Elionurus elegans =

Scientific classification
- Kingdom: Plantae
- Clade: Tracheophytes
- Clade: Angiosperms
- Clade: Monocots
- Clade: Commelinids
- Order: Poales
- Family: Poaceae
- Subfamily: Panicoideae
- Genus: Elionurus
- Species: E. elegans

Binomial name
- Elionurus elegans Kunth, 1830

Synonyms
- Andropogon elegans (Kunth) Gay ex Steud.; Callichloea elegans (Kunth) Steud.

Species of grass

Elionurus elegans is a species of plants in the family Poaceae. It is found in Nigeria, Senegal and Burkina Faso. It is used as a fodder plant. Its essential oils from the aerial parts contain the terpenic compounds campherenone (43.0%), caryophyllene oxide (4.9%) and bisabolone (4.9%) whereas root essential oils contain campherenone (39.0%), epi-beta-santalene (12.0%) and caryophyllene oxide (4.6%).
