= Festuca renvoizei =

Scientific classification
- Kingdom: Plantae
- Clade: Tracheophytes
- Clade: Angiosperms
- Clade: Monocots
- Clade: Commelinids
- Order: Poales
- Family: Poaceae
- Subfamily: Pooideae
- Genus: Festuca
- Species: F. renvoizei

Binomial name
- Festuca renvoizei Stančík

Species of flowering plant

Festuca renvoizei is a species of flowering plant belonging to the grass family (Poaceae). It was first described by the Czech botanist Daniel Stančík in 2007. It was named in honor of the British botanist Stephen Andrew Renvoize for his work in taxonomy and systematics of grasses.

== Description ==
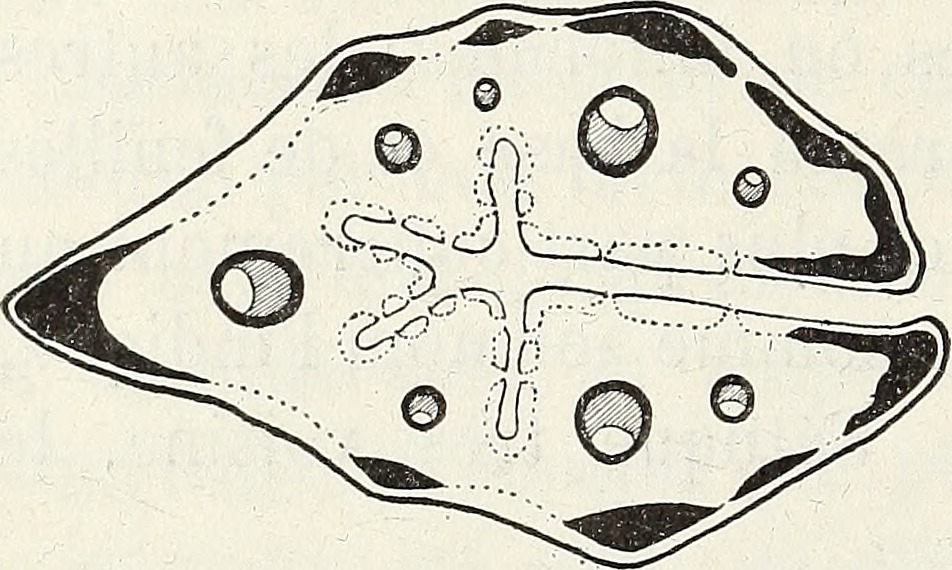
Schematic Festuca leaf section. Botanical Illustration.

Festuca renvoizei grows perennial and can be 50–60 cm (20–24 in) in height. Plants form small tussocks with erect culms. Leaf sheaths are membranous, not covered in hair and have a brownish grey color. Where the leaf blade meets the culm a papery dry (ciliate) ligule sits. The blades are green, linear and folded as typical for Festuca species. In cross-section view, 5-8 vascular bundles can be observed, which is often an important diagnostic character in many Festuca species.

When flowering, F. renvoizei develops an inflorescence in the form of a slender, contracted panicle. Each spikelet contains 2-3 perfect florets. Glumes are membranous, dark purple, where the lower ones are lanceolate and 1-nerved, while the upper ones are oblong-lanceolate and 3-nerved. Lemmas are 5-nerved, dark purple, acute, rough at the apex ending in a short awn.

== Ecology and distribution ==
Festuca renvoizei is a species endemic to the Andes in north Peru. where it was found in the páramo (jalca) zone. Only few localities are known, the type specimen was collected from a wet area near a lagoon at an altitude of 4,000 m (13,000 ft) above sea level.

== Systematics ==
Festuca renvoizei belongs to the fine-leafed clade of Loliinae and was placed in subgenus Festuca, section Festuca. Because of its dense, contracted panicles and lanceolate spikelets it was described as belonging to the Festuca glumosa group.
