= Eremochloa renvoizei =

Scientific classification
- Kingdom: Plantae
- Clade: Tracheophytes
- Clade: Angiosperms
- Clade: Monocots
- Clade: Commelinids
- Order: Poales
- Family: Poaceae
- Subfamily: Panicoideae
- Genus: Eremochloa
- Species: E. renvoizei

Binomial name
- Eremochloa renvoizei Traiperm & Boonkerd

Species of flowering plant

Eremochloa renvoizei is a species of flowering plant belonging to the grass family (Poaceae). It was first described by P. Traiperm and T. Boonkerd in 2012. The species epithet renvoizei was chosen to honor the British botanist Stephen Andrew Renvoize for his work on the taxonomy and systematics of grasses.

== Description ==
Eremochloa renvoizei grows perennial and builds small tufts from its slender cataphyll-covered rhizome. Plants are rather hairless (glabrous) and reach about 20–30 cm (7.9–11.8 in) in height, only the leaf sheaths of some individuals may be covered in trichomes (hirsute). Newly emerging leaves and branches are covered by the previous leaf sheaths. The ligule of each leaf is a short fringe of fine hairs. Leaf blades can be flat or slightly folded with entire margins, acute apex and 3–15 cm (1.2–5.9 in) in length.

When E. renvoizei starts to flower an inflorescence emerges in form form of a 3–6 cm (1.2–2.4 in) long, solitary and straight raceme. The spikelets are directly attached to the rachis, its lower glume is oblong in form and shows 4-6 ridges. To each side of the glume, so called setae are attached, which are stiff bristle-like projections. Dark-red wings sit at both sides of the glume tip. Within each flower are three anthers and two purplish stigmata. After anthesis an egg-shaped fruit (caryopsis) is developing.

== Ecology and distribution ==
Eremochloa renvoizei is only known from few localities in north Thailand, some of which are in Phu Kradung National Park. There it was found growing in moist soil in sandstone crevices close to a steam in a pine forest.
