= Stephen Andrew Renvoize =

English botanist and researcher

Stephen A. Renvoize (born 1944) is an English botanist and researcher. His work focusses on grasses of the world.

== Biography and education ==
Stephen A. Renvoize was born in 1944. He studied at the University of London and gained a BSc there in 1969. Continuing his academic carrier at the University of Reading he then was awarded an MPhil in 1977. He worked for 41 years at Royal Botanical Garden Kew before he retired.

== Works ==
In the International Plant Name Index his contribution is listed with 229 published names, which includes many taxa, varieties and other taxonomic treatments.

Herbarium material of Renvoizea trinii (Kunth) Zuloaga & Morrone

=== Select taxa descriptions ===
- Sporobolus aldabrensis Renvoize, 1971
- Suddia sagittifolia Renvoize, 1984
- Paspalum reticulinerve Renvoize, 1995
- Miscanthus paniculatus (B.S.Sun) S.L.Chen & Renvoize, 2006
- Brachiaria nodosa Renvoize & Bosser, 2018 (heterotypic synonym of Echinochloa hubbardii (A.Camus) Voronts. 2022)

=== Honorary taxa names ===
- Genus Renvoizea Zuloaga & Morrone, 2008
- Schwartzia renvoizei Gir.-Cañas, 2004
- Chusquea renvoizei L.G.Clark, 2003
- Trachypogon renvoizei Catasús, 1996
- Eremochloa renvoizei Traiperm & Boonkerd, 2012
- Festuca renvoizei Stančík, 2007
- Flacourtia ramontchi var. renvoizei Fosberg, 1974

== Gallery ==
Herbarium entry by S. A. Renvoize of Trisetum rigidum. 2004 in Georgia

Herbarium entry by S. A. Renvoize of Festuca potosiana. 1992 Bolivia.

Herbarium entry of Gynerium sagittatum var subandinum. 1987 Bolivia
