= Ophiuros exaltatus =

Scientific classification
- Kingdom: Plantae
- Clade: Tracheophytes
- Clade: Angiosperms
- Clade: Monocots
- Clade: Commelinids
- Order: Poales
- Family: Poaceae
- Subfamily: Panicoideae
- Genus: Ophiuros
- Species: O. exaltatus

Binomial name
- Ophiuros exaltatus (L.) Kuntze

Synonyms
- Aegilops exaltata L.; Mnesithea exaltata (L.) Skeels; Ophiuros corymbosus C.F.Gaertn.; Ophiuros tongcalingii (Elmer) Henrard; Rottboellia corymbosa L.f.; Rottboellia exaltata (L.) Naezén; Rottboellia punctata Retz.; Rottboellia tongcalingii Elmer

Species of plant

Ophiuros exaltatus is a species of flowering plant in the grass family Poaceae. It is native to the seasonally dry tropics of the Indian Subcontinent, southern China, Southeast Asia, some of the islands of Malesia, New Guinea, and northern Australia. A tufted perennial grass reaching 0.5 to 1.5 m (20 to 60 in), since Linnaeus it has been subject to taxonomic confusion with the much more widespread and invasive grass Rottboellia exaltata L.f. (now Rottboellia cochinchinensis).
