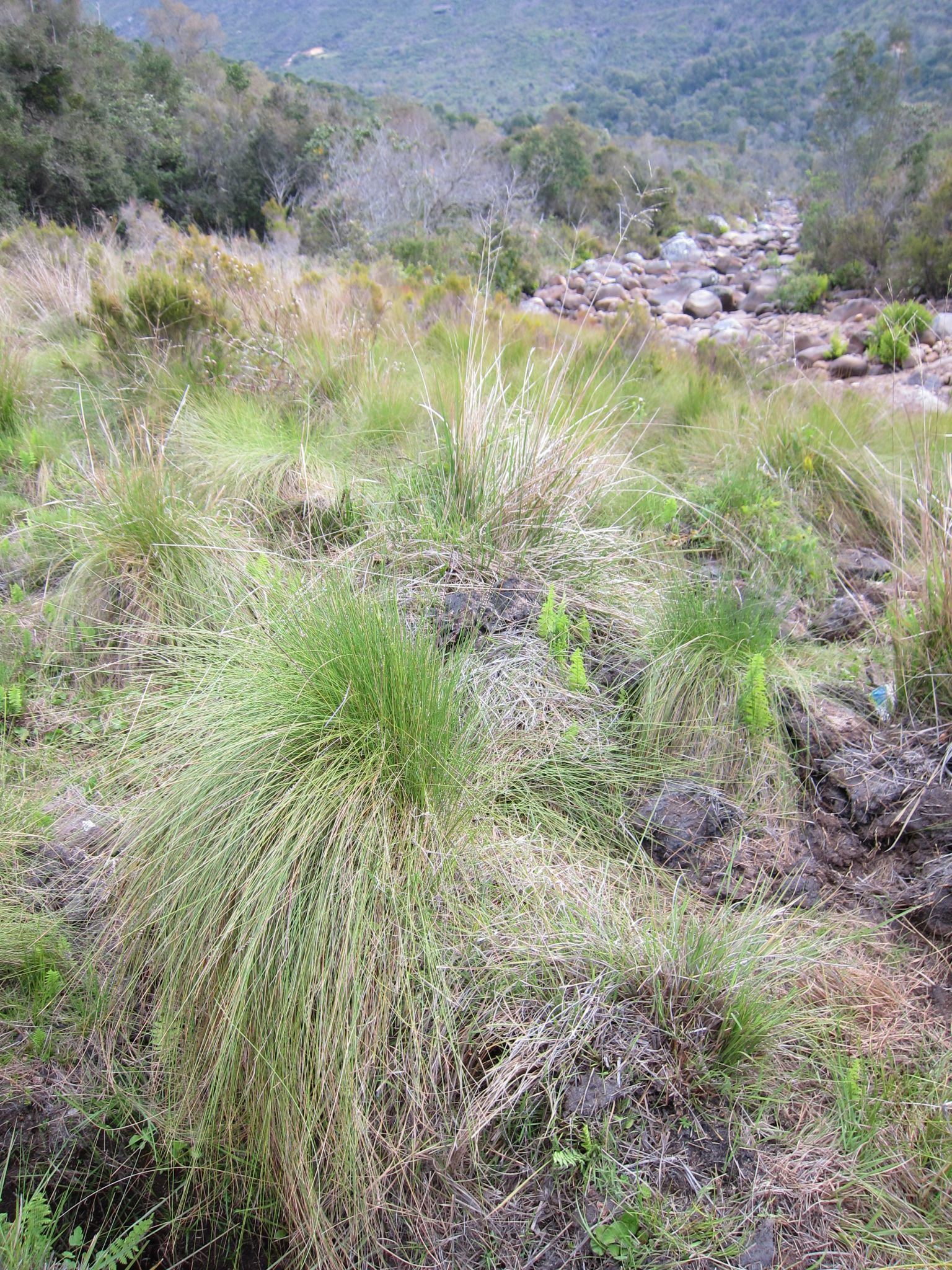
- Rhytachne rottboellioides in Madagascar

Scientific classification
- Kingdom: Plantae
- Clade: Tracheophytes
- Clade: Angiosperms
- Clade: Monocots
- Clade: Commelinids
- Order: Poales
- Family: Poaceae
- Subfamily: Panicoideae
- Supertribe: Andropogonodae
- Tribe: Andropogoneae
- Subtribe: Tripsacinae
- Genus: Rhytachne; Desv. ex Ham.

Type species
- Rhytachne rottboellioides Desv.

Synonyms
- Lepturopsis Steud.

= Rhytachne =

Genus of grasses

Rhytachne is a genus of plants in the grass family. They grow principally in wet savannahs in Africa and the Americas. More specifically, they tend to prefer transitional zones between marshes and drier upland savannahs. In the Americas, the genus can be found from southern Mexico and Cuba south to northern Argentina, while in Africa it is present in Sub-Saharan Africa, including in Madagascar. Twelve species are included, of which nine are African, two are American, and one, Rhytachne subgibbosa, is found on both continents. The genus is closely related to Coelorachis.

Species

- Rhytachne furtiva Clayton - Ghana, Burkina Faso
- Rhytachne glabra (Gledhill) Clayton - Guinea, Sierra Leone, Ivory Coast
- Rhytachne gonzalezii Davidse - Suriname, Venezuela (Guárico, Apure), Brazil (Pará)
- Rhytachne gracilis Stapf - West Africa from Senegal to Cameroon
- Rhytachne guianensis (Hitchc.) Clayton - Mexico (Tabasco), Venezuela (Guárico, Apure, Amazonas, Bolívar), Guyana, Suriname, Brazil (Amapá, Minas Gerais)
- Rhytachne latifolia Clayton - Tanzania, Zambia
- Rhytachne megastachya Jacq.-Fél. Ghana, Guinea, Liberia, Sierra Leone
- Rhytachne perfecta Jacq.-Fél. - Guinea
- Rhytachne robusta Stapf - Zambia, Angola, Namibia
- Rhytachne rottboellioides Desv. ex Ham. - Madagascar, tropical + southern Africa
- Rhytachne subgibbosa (Winkler ex Hack.) Clayton - Yucatán Peninsula in Mexico; Honduras, Brazil, Argentina, Paraguay, Zambia
- Rhytachne triaristata (Steud.) Stapf - tropical Africa

formerly included

see Loxodera Phacelurus Thelepogon Urelytrum

- Rhytachne anisonodis - Phacelurus trichophyllus
- Rhytachne bovonei - Loxodera bovonei
- Rhytachne congoensis - Phacelurus gabonensis
- Rhytachne gabonensis - Phacelurus gabonensis
- Rhytachne gigantea - Urelytrum giganteum
- Rhytachne lijiangensis - Phacelurus trichophyllus
- Rhytachne pilosa - Loxodera bovonei
- Rhytachne princeps - Thelepogon elegans
