= Chasmopodium =

Scientific classification
- Kingdom: Plantae
- Clade: Tracheophytes
- Clade: Angiosperms
- Clade: Monocots
- Clade: Commelinids
- Order: Poales
- Family: Poaceae
- Subfamily: Panicoideae
- Supertribe: Andropogonodae
- Tribe: Andropogoneae
- Subtribe: Rottboelliinae
- Genus: Chasmopodium; Stapf

Type species
- Chasmopodium caudatum (Hack.) Stapf

Genus of grasses

Chasmopodium is a genus of African plants in the grass family.

Species

- Chasmopodium afzelii (Hack.) Stapf – Sierra Leone, Togo
- Chasmopodium caudatum (Hack.) Stapf – Benin, Burkina Faso, Ghana, Guinea, Guinea-Bissau, Ivory Coast, Liberia, Mali, Niger, Nigeria, Senegal, Sierra Leone, Togo, Central African Republic, Republic of the Congo, Democratic Republic of the Congo, Chad, Sudan, Angola

Formerly included

- Chasmopodium purpurascens - synonym of Rottboellia purpurascens

== See also ==
- List of Poaceae genera
