= Rottboellia purpurascens =

Scientific classification
- Kingdom: Plantae
- Clade: Tracheophytes
- Clade: Angiosperms
- Clade: Monocots
- Clade: Commelinids
- Order: Poales
- Family: Poaceae
- Subfamily: Panicoideae
- Genus: Rottboellia
- Species: R. purpurascens

Binomial name
- Rottboellia purpurascens (Robyns) Jacq.-Fel. (1929)

Synonyms
- Chasmopodium purpurascens (Robyns) Clayton; Robynsiochloa purpurascens (Robyns) Jacq.-Fél.; Rottboellia compressa Vanderyst

Species of swamp grass

Rottboellia purpurascens is a species of swamp grass native to tropical Western Africa and the Congo Basin. It grows 1–1.6 metres (3 ft 3 in – 5 ft 3 in) tall stalks, with 25–55 centimetres (9.8 in – 1 ft 9.7 in) long leaves.
