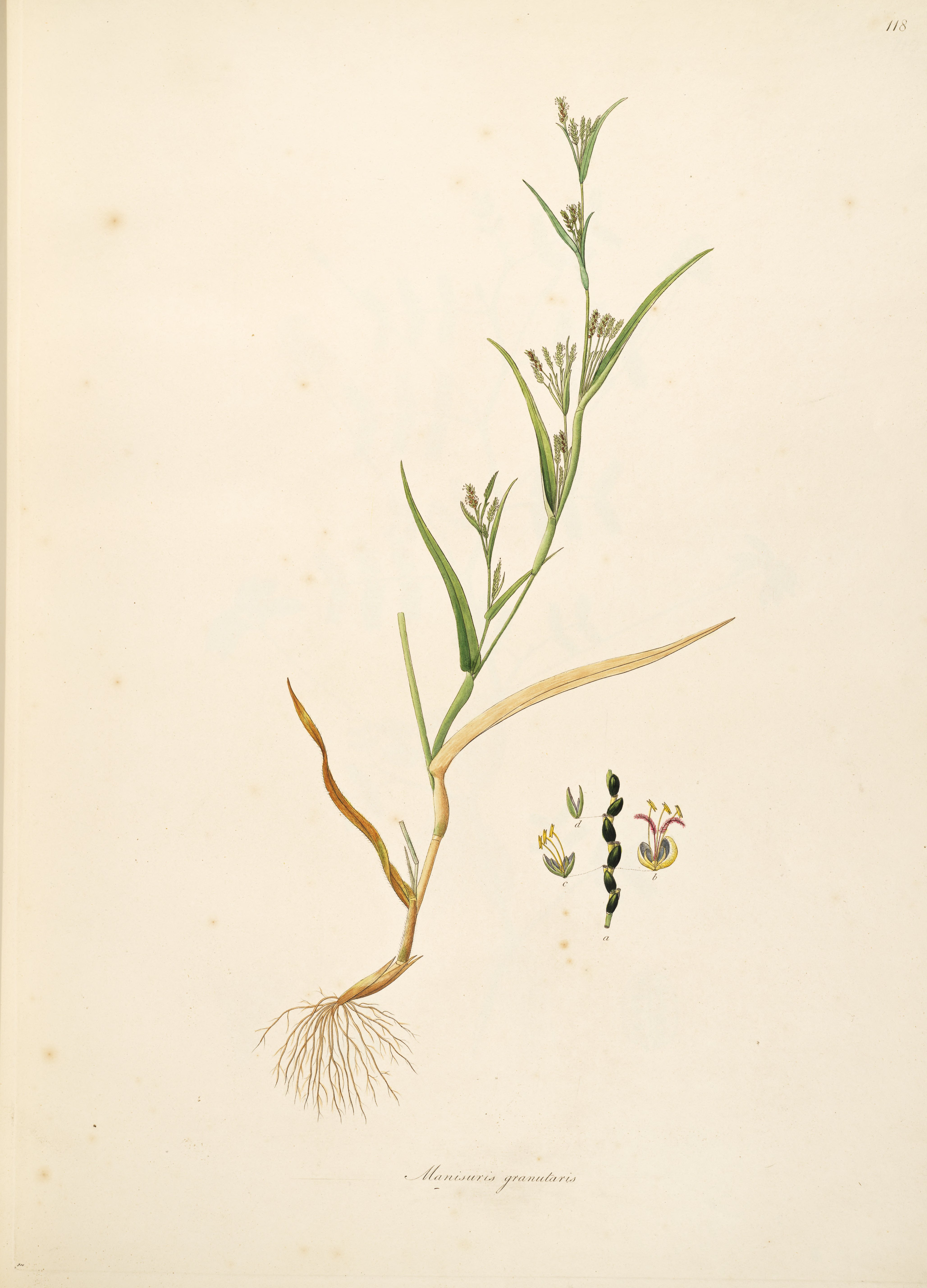
- pitscale grass, native to sub-Saharan Africa

Scientific classification
- Kingdom: Plantae
- Clade: Tracheophytes
- Clade: Angiosperms
- Clade: Monocots
- Clade: Commelinids
- Order: Poales
- Family: Poaceae
- Subfamily: Panicoideae
- Genus: Hackelochloa
- Species: H. granularis

Binomial name
- Hackelochloa granularis (L.) Kuntze

Synonyms
- List: Mnesithea granularis L. de Koning & Sosef, 1829; Cenchrus granularis L.; Rytilix granularis (L.) Skeels

= Hackelochloa granularis =

Species of plant

Hackelochloa granularis, the pitscale grass, is a species of grass native to sub-Saharan Africa and temperate and tropical regions of Asia. It is naturalised to the Southern United States, Mexico and South America.

== Characteristics ==
Hackelochloa granularis is an annual plant. The stems grow to 5–100 cm in length and have bearded nodes. The leaf sheaths are loose with hairs growing from tubercles. The leaves are 2–5 cm in length and 4–12 mm wide with hairs on the surface and ciliate around the edges. The leaves range from straight to lance shaped.
