= Heteropholis =

Scientific classification
- Kingdom: Plantae
- Clade: Tracheophytes
- Clade: Angiosperms
- Clade: Monocots
- Clade: Commelinids
- Order: Poales
- Family: Poaceae
- Subfamily: Panicoideae
- Supertribe: Andropogonodae
- Tribe: Andropogoneae
- Subtribe: Rottboelliinae
- Genus: Heteropholis; C.E.Hubb.

Type species
- Heteropholis sulcata (Stapf) C.E.Hubb.

Genus of grasses

Heteropholis is a genus of African and Sri Lankan plants in the grass family.

Species

- Heteropholis benoistii A.Camus - Madagascar
- Heteropholis nigrescens (Thwaites) C.E.Hubb. - Sri Lanka
- Heteropholis sulcata (Stapf) C.E.Hubb. - Zaḭre, Tanzania, Zambia, Angola, Malawi

Formerly included

see Mnesithea

- Heteropholis annua - Mnesithea annua
- Heteropholis cochinchinensis - Mnesithea laevis var. cochinchinensis
- Heteropholis cochinchinensis var. chenii - Mnesithea laevis var. chenii
