= Tripsacum lanceolatum =

Conservation status
- Least Concern (IUCN 3.1)

Scientific classification
- Kingdom: Plantae
- Clade: Tracheophytes
- Clade: Angiosperms
- Clade: Monocots
- Clade: Commelinids
- Order: Poales
- Family: Poaceae
- Subfamily: Panicoideae
- Genus: Tripsacum
- Species: T. lanceolatum

Binomial name
- Tripsacum lanceolatum E.Fourn.

Species of flowering plant

Tripsacum lanceolatum is a species of grass with the common name of Mexican gamagrass, though as with many common names it doesn't accurately describe it fully since it grows far outside Mexico as well. T. lanceolatum is a perennial bunchgrass as most species in its genus are, that grows in a Tropical Dry biome. Considered LC (least concern) by IUCN.

== Description ==
In photos its flower morphology is distinct from Tripsacum dactyloides whose stigma is a magenta color (though this can vary between plants and populations) compared to T. lanceolatum's stigmas which are far more yellow-green and muted. Though this is not the main descriptor of the plant it should be noted from photos comparing the two.

== Cytology ==
It has a chromosome amount of 2n = 72, usually and is thought to be 'either an allopolyploid or a very old autopolyploid with chromosomal divergence which has led to essentially bivalent meiotic association'.

== Distribution ==
The distribution of T. lanceolatum is widespread with a native distribution in New Mexico, Arizona, Dominican Republic, Haiti, Honduras, and Mexico. There is also an introduced distribution in Southeast Brazil, and Jawa.
