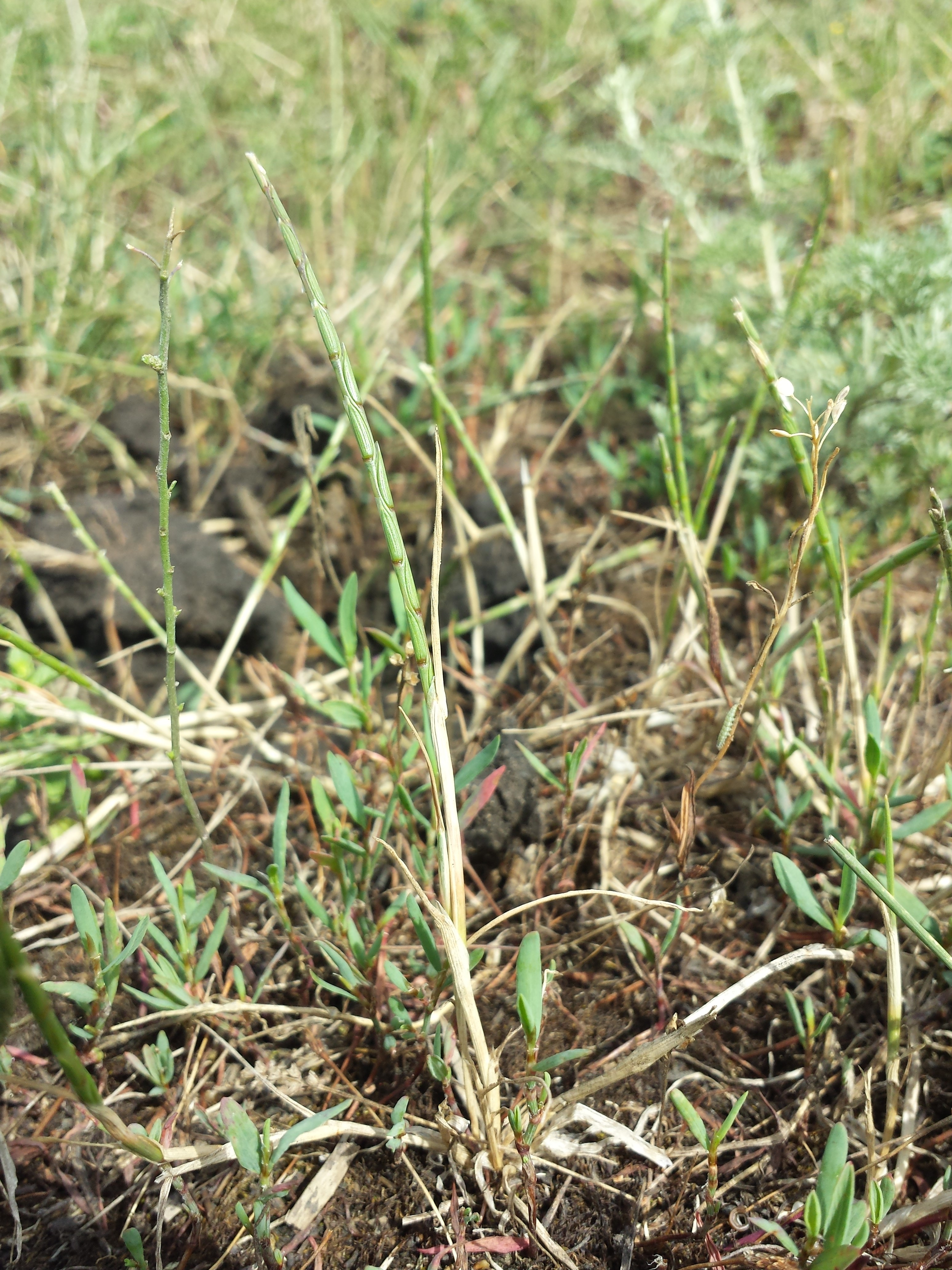
- Pholiurus pannonicus

Scientific classification
- Kingdom: Plantae
- Clade: Tracheophytes
- Clade: Angiosperms
- Clade: Monocots
- Clade: Commelinids
- Order: Poales
- Family: Poaceae
- Subfamily: Pooideae
- Supertribe: Poodae
- Tribe: Poeae
- Subtribe: Beckmanniinae
- Genus: Pholiurus; Host ex Trin.
- Species: P. pannonicus

Binomial name
- Pholiurus pannonicus (Host) Trin.

Synonyms
- Lepturus sect. Pholiurus (Host ex Trin.) Hack.; Rottboellia pannonica Host; Ophiuros pannonicus (Host) P.Beauv.; Lepturus pannonicus (Host) Kunth; Rottboellia salina Kit. ex Spreng.; Rottboellia biflora Roth; Rottboellia salsa Fisch. ex Roem. & Schult.; Lepturus incurvatus var. curvatissimus Asch. & Graebn.; Lepturus incurvatus subsp. curvatissimus (Asch. & Graebn.) Rouy

= Pholiurus =

Genus of grasses

Pholiurus is a genus of Eurasian plants in the grass family. The only known species is Pholiurus pannonicus, found in a region stretching from Austria to Kazakhstan.

formerly included

see Henrardia, Parapholis and Phacelurus.

- Pholiurus filiformis – Parapholis filiformis
- Pholiurus glabriglumis – Henrardia persica
- Pholiurus graecus – Phacelurus digitatus
- Pholiurus incurvatus – Parapholis incurva
- Pholiurus persicus – Henrardia persica
- Pholiurus pubescens – Henrardia pubescens
