= Tripsacum laxum =

Scientific classification
- Kingdom: Plantae
- Clade: Tracheophytes
- Clade: Angiosperms
- Clade: Monocots
- Clade: Commelinids
- Order: Poales
- Family: Poaceae
- Subfamily: Panicoideae
- Genus: Tripsacum
- Species: T. laxum

Binomial name
- Tripsacum laxum Nash

Species of grass

Tripsacum laxum, the Guatemalan gamagrass, is a species of grass in the family Poaceae. It is a larger perennial bunchgrass of the Caribbean, Central America, such as in Nicaragua and Guatemala, and North America in southern Mexico.
