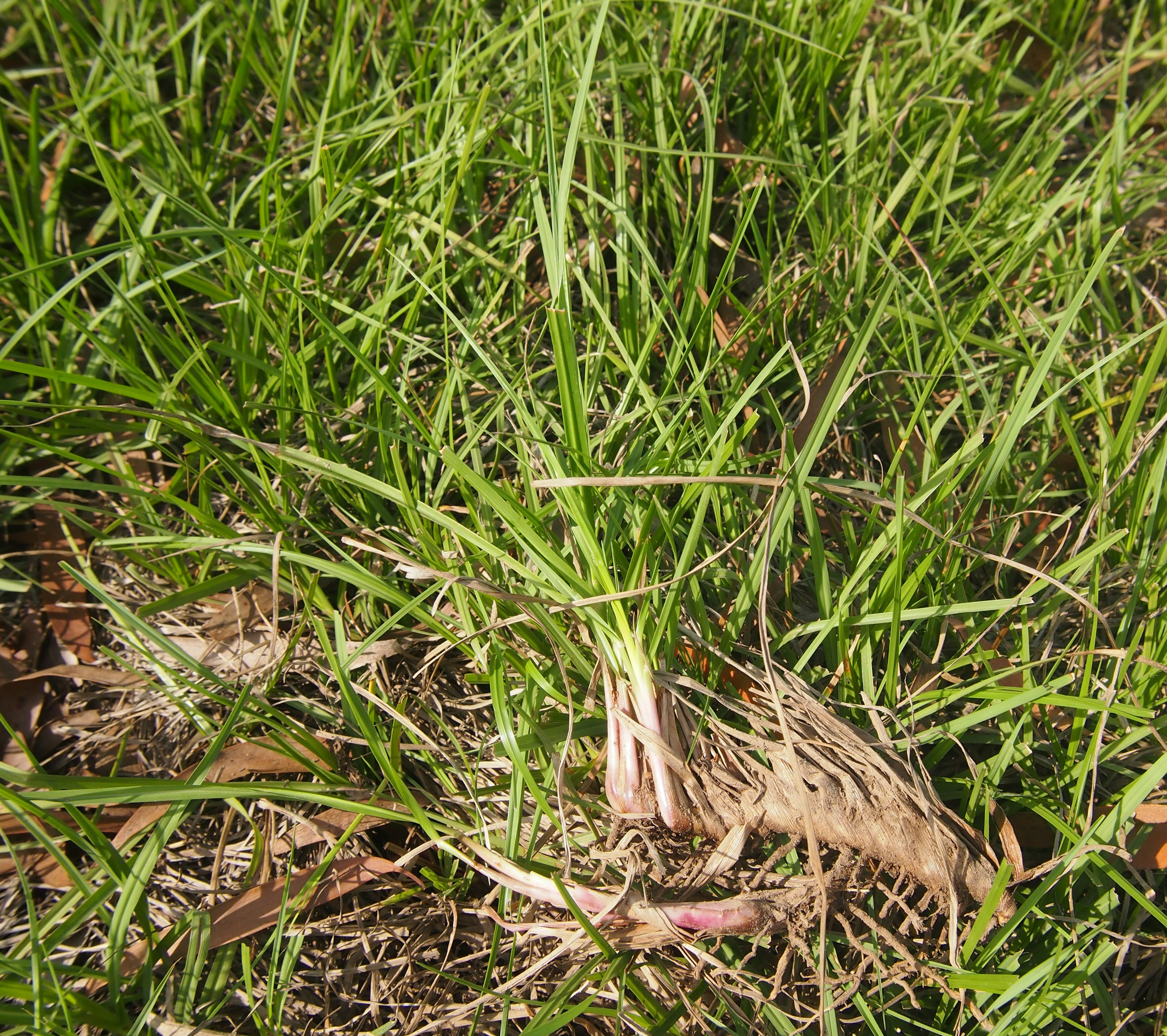
- Eremochloa bimaculata

Scientific classification
- Kingdom: Plantae
- Clade: Tracheophytes
- Clade: Angiosperms
- Clade: Monocots
- Clade: Commelinids
- Order: Poales
- Family: Poaceae
- Subfamily: Panicoideae
- Supertribe: Andropogonodae
- Tribe: Andropogoneae
- Subtribe: Rottboelliinae
- Genus: Eremochloa; Buse

Type species
- Eremochloa horneri (syn of E. ciliaris) Buse

Synonyms
- Pectinaria (Benth.) Hack. 1887, illegitimate homonym not Bernh. 1800 nor Haw. 1819 nor Cordem. 1899; Sehima sect. Eremochloa Roberty

= Eremochloa =

Genus of grasses

Eremochloa is a genus of Asian and Australian plants in the grass family.

Species

- Eremochloa attenuata Buit. - Thailand
- Eremochloa bimaculata Hack. - Guizhou, Hubei, Sichuan, Yunnan, Cambodia, Myanmar, New Guinea, Thailand, Vietnam, Queensland, New South Wales, Victoria
- Eremochloa ciliaris (L.) Merr. - Fujian, Guangdong, Guangxi, Guizhou, Hainan, Taiwan, Yunnan, Cambodia, Indonesia, Laos, Malaysia, Myanmar, New Guinea, Philippines, Thailand, Vietnam, Queensland
- Eremochloa ciliatifolia Hack. - Myanmar, Thailand, Vietnam
- Eremochloa eriopoda C.E.Hubb. - Indochina, Sulawesi
- Eremochloa lanceolata Buit. - Thailand
- Eremochloa maxwellii Veldkamp - Thailand
- Eremochloa muricata (Retz.) Hack. - Guangdong, Myanmar, Thailand, Vietnam, Sri Lanka, Tamil Nadu
- Eremochloa ophiuroides (Munro) Hack. - Anhui, Fujian, Guangdong, Guangxi, Guizhou, Hainan, Henan, Hubei, Hunan, Jiangsu, Jiangxi, Sichuan, Taiwan, Zhejiang, Vietnam
- Eremochloa pectinata Buit. - India, Sri Lanka
- Eremochloa petelotii Merr. - Thailand, Vietnam, Cambodia
- Eremochloa renvoizei Traiperm & Boonkerd - Thailand
- Eremochloa zeylanica (Trimen) Hack. - Yunnan, Guangxi, Sri Lanka, Andaman Islands
