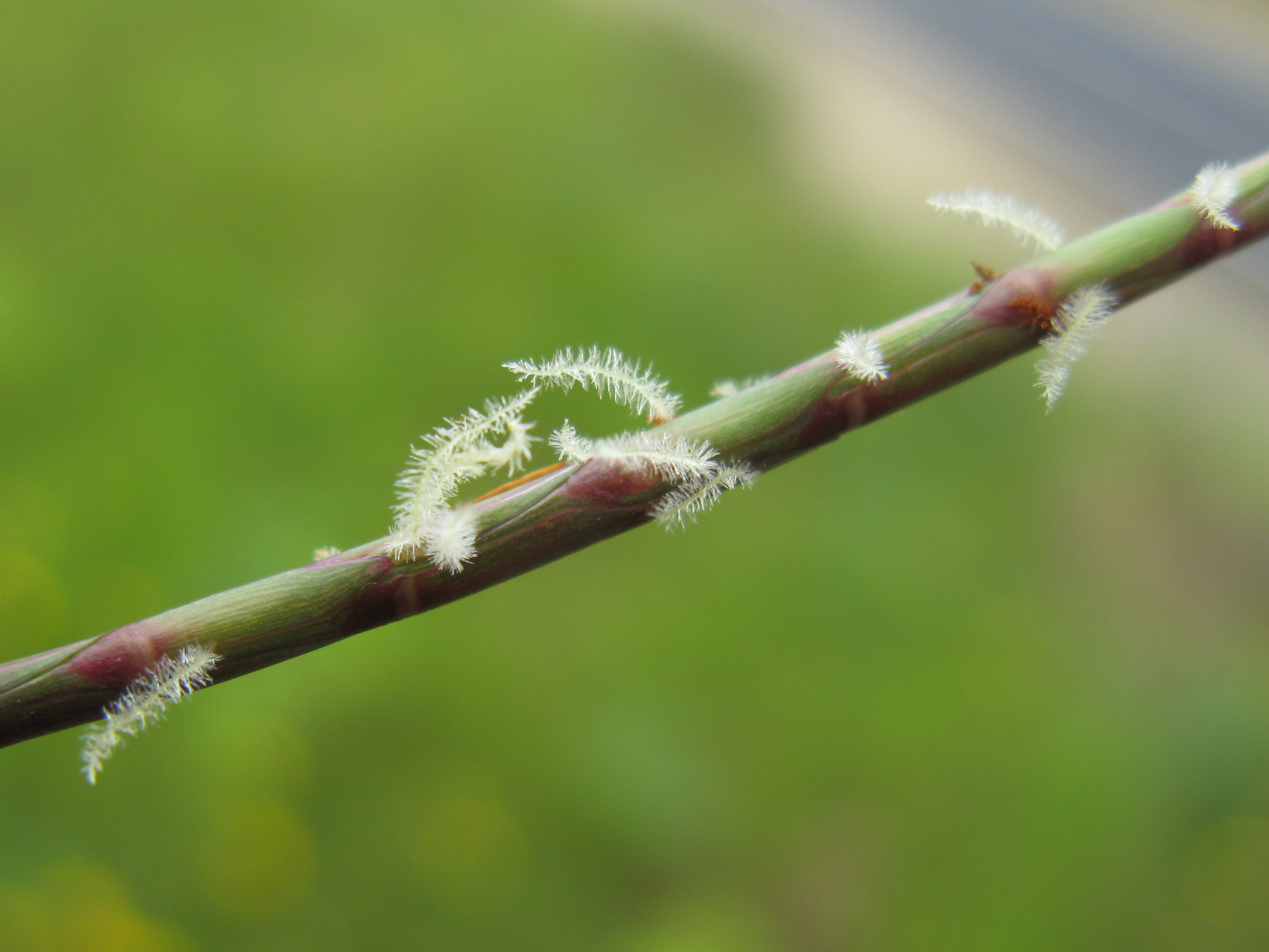
- Hemarthria uncinata

Scientific classification
- Kingdom: Plantae
- Clade: Tracheophytes
- Clade: Angiosperms
- Clade: Monocots
- Clade: Commelinids
- Order: Poales
- Family: Poaceae
- Subfamily: Panicoideae
- Supertribe: Andropogonodae
- Tribe: Andropogoneae
- Subtribe: Rottboelliinae
- Genus: Hemarthria; R.Br.

Type species
- Hemarthria compressa (L.f.) R.Br.

Synonyms
- Lodicularia P.Beauv.

= Hemarthria =

Jointgrasses

Genus of grasses

Hemarthria is a genus of herbaceous plants in the grass family. They occur in the tropical and subtropical Old World, especially in China and Southeast Asia, with some species in Africa, Australia, and Southern Europe. They may be known generally as jointgrasses.

Species

- Hemarthria altissima (Poir.) Stapf & C.E.Hubb. - limpograss, African jointgrass, Batavian quick grass, halt grass - China, India, Indochina, Borneo, Madagascar, Mauritius, Middle East, Caucasus, Africa, Canary Islands, Spain, Italy, Greece; naturalized in parts of North + South America
- Hemarthria compressa (L.f.) R.Br. - whip grass - China, Japan, Indian Subcontinent, Indochina, Borneo, Afghanistan, Iraq, Comoros
- Hemarthria debilis Bor - Thailand
- Hemarthria depressa Heuvel- Laos, Vietnam, Thailand, Malaysia
- Hemarthria hamiltoniana Steud. - India, Bangladesh
- Hemarthria longiflora (Hook.f.) A.Camus - China, Indian Subcontinent, Indochina, Borneo
- Hemarthria natans Stapf - eastern + south-central Africa
- Hemarthria pratensis (Balansa) Clayton - Thailand, Vietnam, New Guinea
- Hemarthria protensa Steud. - Guangdong, eastern Himalayas, southeast Asia, New Guinea
- Hemarthria sibirica (Gand.) Ohwi - China, Japan, Korea, Pakistan, Russia (Amur Oblast, Primorye, Khabarovsk)
- Hemarthria stolonifera Bor - Thailand
- Hemarthria uncinata R.Br. - matgrass - Western Australia

formerly included

see Coelorachis Mnesithea

- Hemarthria perforata - Mnesithea laevis
- Hemarthria rugosa - Coelorachis rugosa
