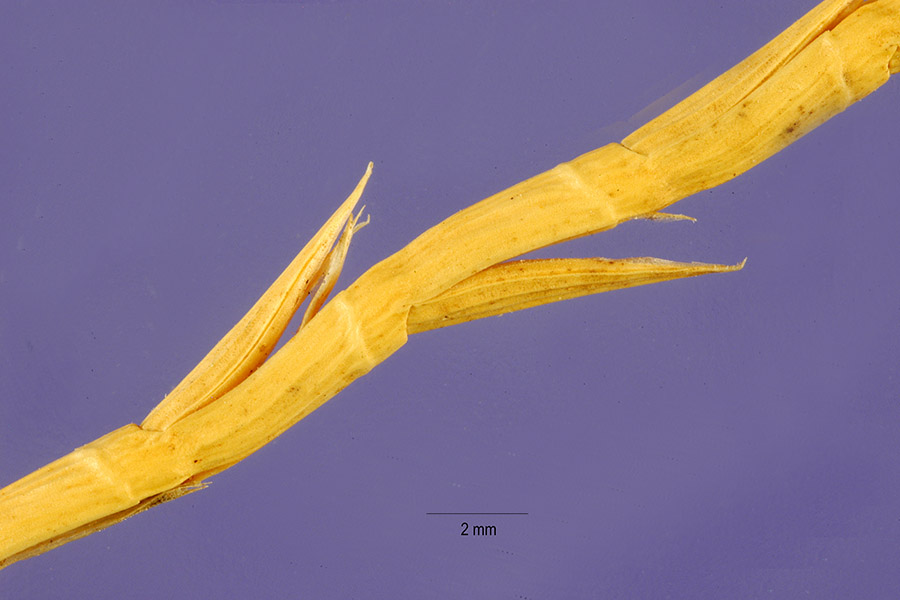

Scientific classification
- Kingdom: Plantae
- Clade: Tracheophytes
- Clade: Angiosperms
- Clade: Monocots
- Clade: Commelinids
- Order: Poales
- Family: Poaceae
- Subfamily: Pooideae
- Supertribe: Poodae
- Tribe: Poeae
- Subtribe: Parapholiinae
- Genus: Hainardia; Greuter
- Species: H. cylindrica

Binomial name
- Hainardia cylindrica (Willd.) Greuter

Synonyms
- Rottboellia cylindrica Willd.; Ophiuros cylindricus (Willd.) P.Beauv.; Lepturus cylindricus (Willd.) Trin.; Monerma cylindrica (Willd.) Coss. & Durieu; Lolium cylindricum (Willd.) Asch. & Graebn.; Rottboellia ramosa Cav.; Rottboellia adscendens Brot.; Rottboellia subulata Savi; Monerma monandra P.Beauv.; Monerma ramosa (Cav.) Schult.; Lepturus ramosus (Cav.) Kunth; Lepturus subulatus (Savi) Kunth; Monerma simplex Gaudich.; Ophiuros subulatus Link; Lepturus simplex (Gaudich.) Kunth; Lepturus cylindricus var. gracilis (Coss. & Durieu) Coss. & Durieu; Monerma cylindrica var. gracilis Coss. & Durieu; Monerma subulata (Savi) B.D.Jacks.; Lepturus cylindricus var. asperulus Maire

= Hainardia =

Genus of grasses

Hainardia is a genus of coastal plants in the grass family, native to the Mediterranean Basin.

The only known species is Hainardia cylindrica, known by several common names, including barbgrass, one-glumed hard-grass, and thintail. It is native to the Mediterranean and to nearby regions from Madeira and the Canary Islands east to Crimea and Iran. It is also reportedly naturalized in coastal regions in scattered locales in Australia, New Zealand, the United States (CA OR TX LA SC), Baja California, and temperate South America (Brazil, Uruguay, Argentina, Chile).

Hainardia cylindrica is an annual grass of salt marshes and estuaries, thriving in saline and alkaline soils in aquatic habitats. It has a branching stem reaching a maximum height near half a meter. The thready leaves are ribbed and rough to the touch on the upper surfaces. The top few centimeters of the stem is made up of a cylindrical inflorescence with each spikelet embedded into it and dividing it into segments which can break off.
