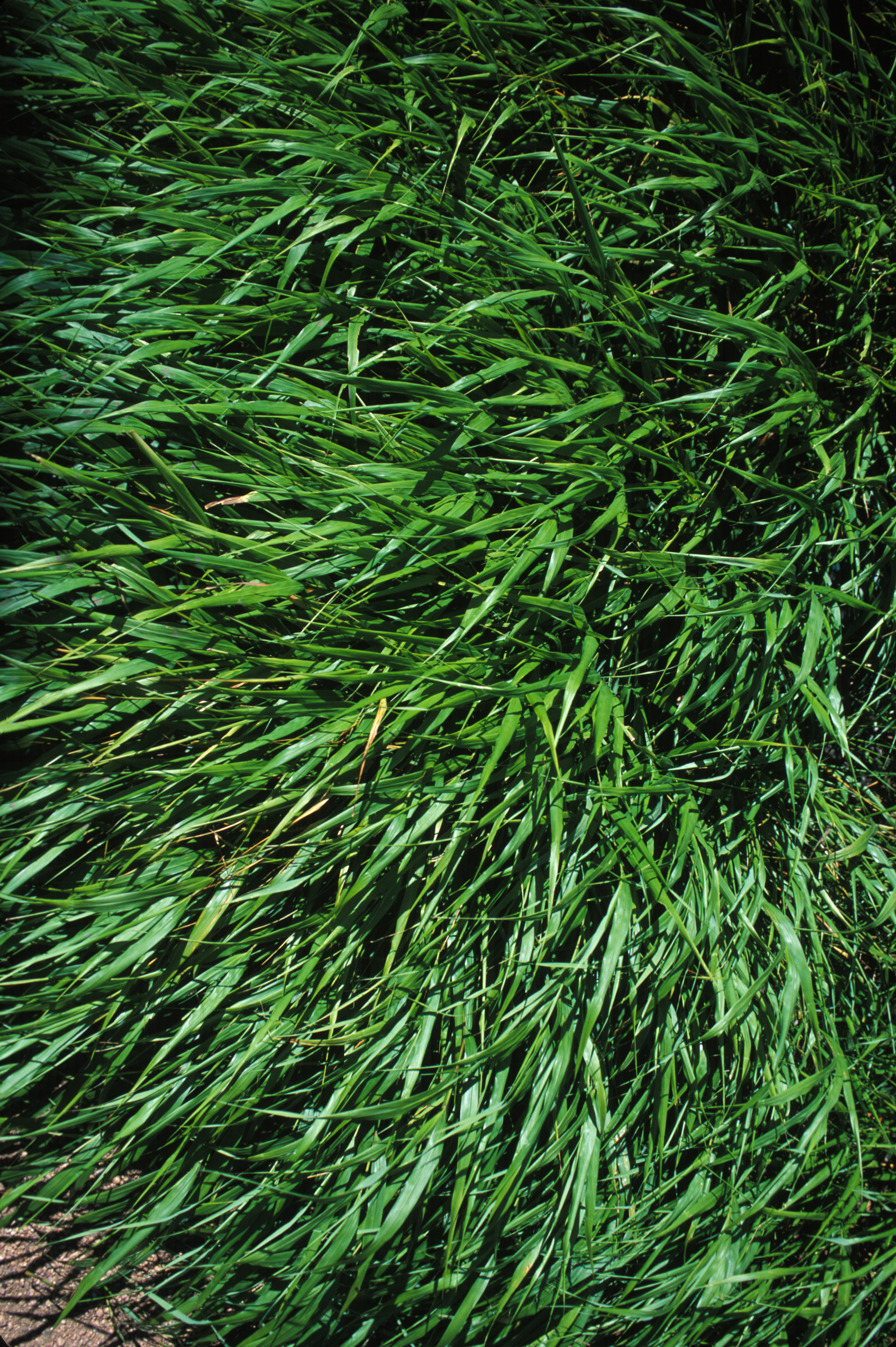
- Hackelochloa sp.

Scientific classification
- Kingdom: Plantae
- Clade: Tracheophytes
- Clade: Angiosperms
- Clade: Monocots
- Clade: Commelinids
- Order: Poales
- Family: Poaceae
- Subfamily: Panicoideae
- Supertribe: Andropogonodae
- Tribe: Andropogoneae
- Subtribe: Rottboelliinae
- Genus: Hackelochloa; Kuntze

Type species
- Hackelochloa granularis (L.) Kuntze

Synonyms
- Rytilix Raf. ex Hitchc.

= Hackelochloa =

Genus of grasses

Hackelochloa is a genus of Asian and African plants in the grass family.

The genus was named after Eduard Hackel, an Austrian botanist, by Otto Kuntze, in 1891.

== Species ==
- Hackelochloa granularis (L.) Kuntze - sub-Saharan Africa; southern Asia from Yemen to Japan to Indonesia; Papuasia, Micronesia; naturalized in Western Hemisphere from Maryland to Paraguay
- Hackelochloa porifera (Hack.) D. Rhind. - Yunnan, Bhutan, Assam, Arunachal Pradesh, Myanmar, Vietnam
