= Parapholis filiformis =

Scientific classification
- Kingdom: Plantae
- Clade: Tracheophytes
- Clade: Angiosperms
- Clade: Monocots
- Clade: Commelinids
- Order: Poales
- Family: Poaceae
- Subfamily: Pooideae
- Genus: Parapholis
- Species: P. filiformis

Binomial name
- Parapholis filiformis (Roth) C.E.Hubb.

Synonyms
- Rottboellia filiformis

Species of plant

Parapholis filiformis is a species of annual herb in the family Poaceae (true grasses). They have a self-supporting growth form and simple, broad leaves. Individuals can grow to 0.17 m.

== Sources ==
This article incorporates text from a free content work. Licensed under CC0 (license statement/permission). Text taken from Parapholis filiformis. Encyclopedia of Life.
