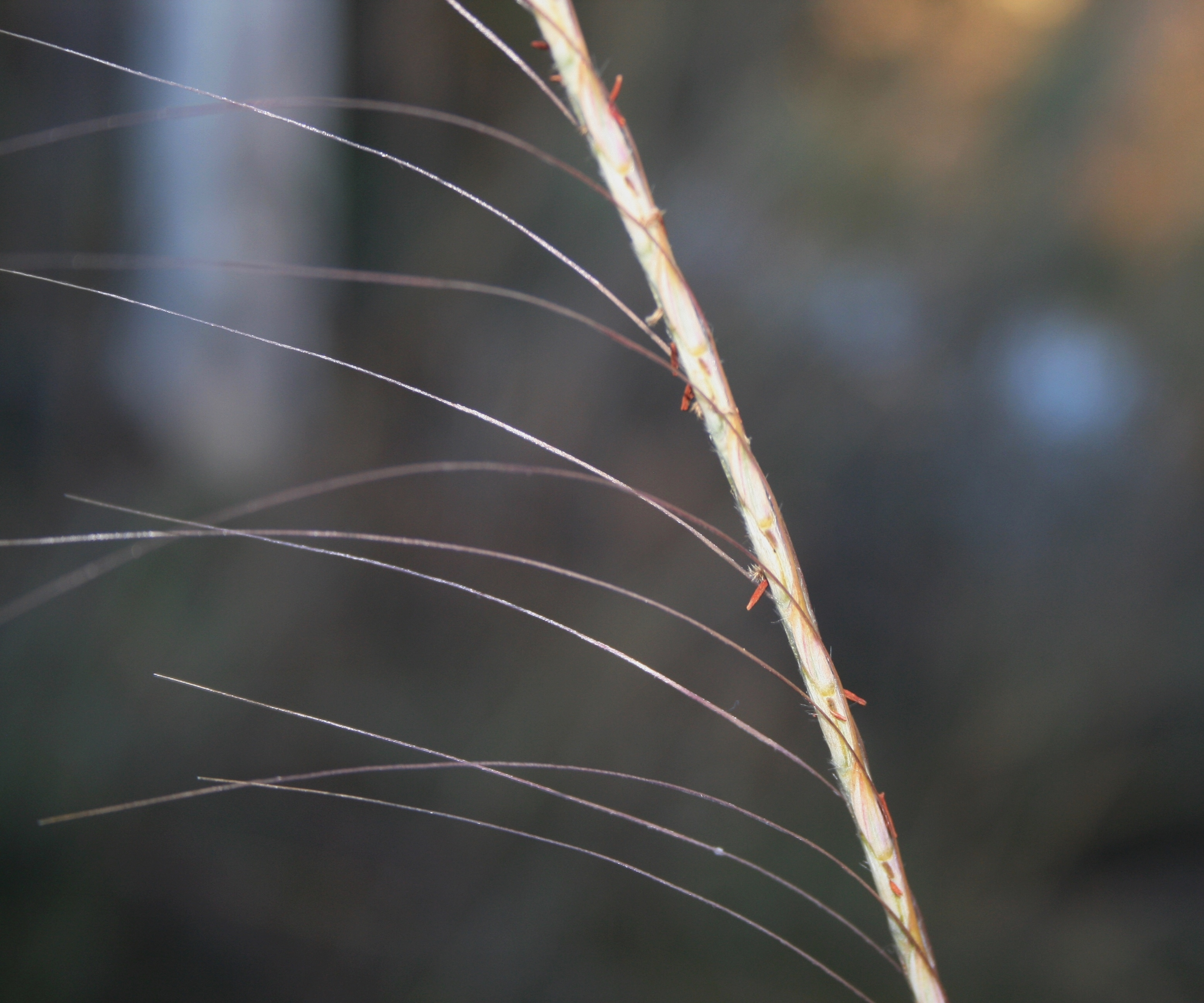
- Inflorescence of U. agropyroides

Scientific classification
- Kingdom: Plantae
- Clade: Tracheophytes
- Clade: Angiosperms
- Clade: Monocots
- Clade: Commelinids
- Order: Poales
- Family: Poaceae
- Subfamily: Panicoideae
- Supertribe: Andropogonodae
- Tribe: Andropogoneae
- Subtribe: Tripsacinae
- Genus: Urelytrum; Hack.

Type species
- Urelytrum agropyroides (Hack.) Hack.

= Urelytrum =

Genus of plants

Urelytrum is a genus of African plants in the grass family.

Species

- Urelytrum agropyroides (Hack.) Hack. — Madagascar, tropical + southern Africa
- Urelytrum annuum Stapf — West Africa
- Urelytrum auriculatum C.E.Hubb. — Nigeria
- Urelytrum digitatum K.Schum. — central Africa
- Urelytrum giganteum Pilg. — central Africa
- Urelytrum henrardii Chippind. — Zaïre, Zambia, Caprivi Strip
- Urelytrum isalense A.Camus — Madagascar
- Urelytrum muricatum C.E.Hubb. — West Africa

Formerly included

see Loxodera

- Urelytrum strigosum, now Loxodera strigosa
