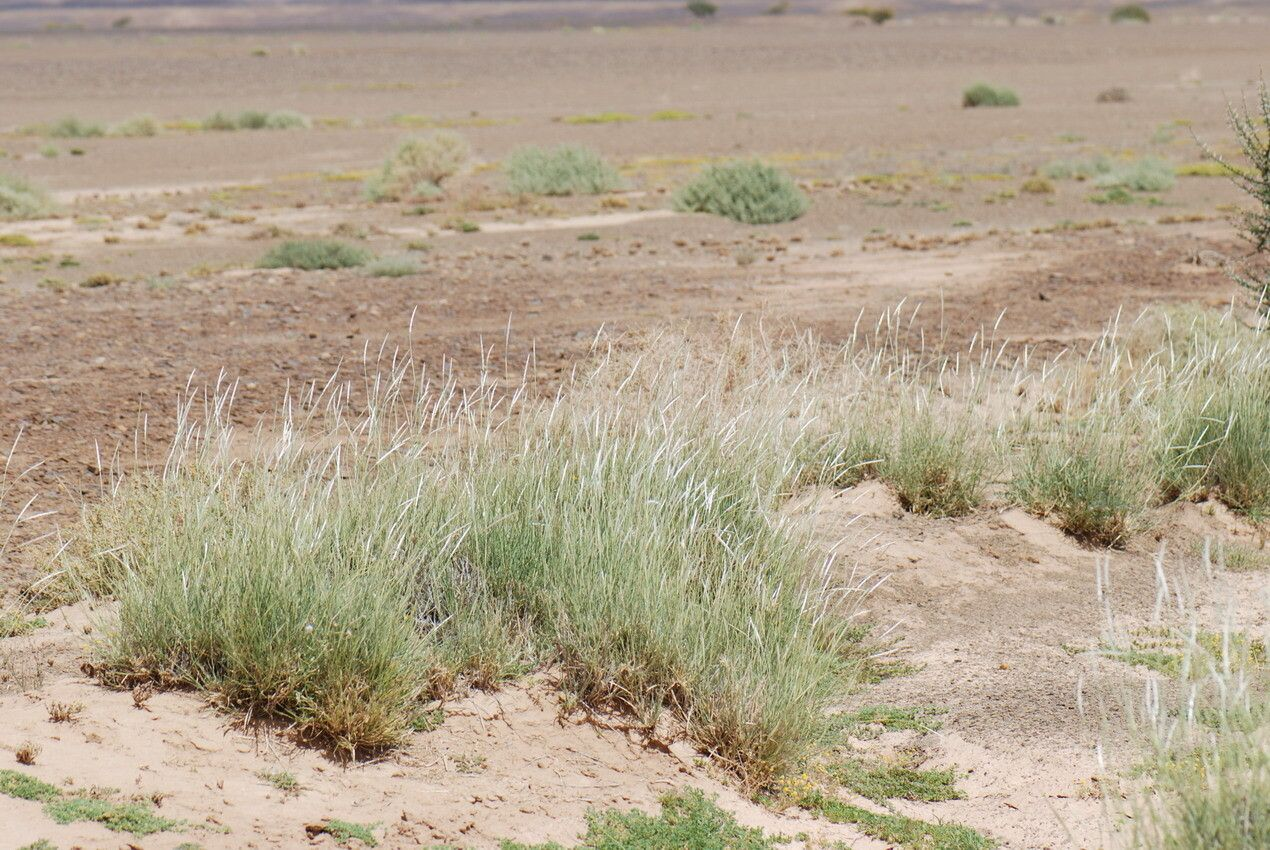

Scientific classification
- Kingdom: Plantae
- Clade: Embryophytes
- Clade: Tracheophytes
- Clade: Angiosperms
- Clade: Monocots
- Clade: Commelinids
- Order: Poales
- Family: Poaceae
- Subfamily: Panicoideae
- Supertribe: Andropogonodae
- Tribe: Andropogoneae
- Subtribe: Rottboelliinae
- Genus: Lasiurus; Boiss.
- Species: L. scindicus

Binomial name
- Lasiurus scindicus Henrard

Synonyms
- Saccharum hirsutum Forssk.; Triticum aegilopoides Forssk.; Rottboellia hirsuta Vahl; Tripsacum hirsutum (Vahl) Raspail; Coelorachis hirsuta Brongn.; Ischaemum mastrucatum Trin.; Tripsacum aegilopoides (Forssk.) Kunth; Ischaemum hirsutum Nees ex Steud.; Lasiurus hirsutus Boiss.; Elionurus hirsutus (Vahl) Munro ex Benth.; Manisuris hirsuta Kuntze; Lasiurus ecaudatus Satyanar. & Shank.; Lasiurus hirsutus subsp. arabicus Chrtek

= Lasiurus scindicus =

Species of plant

Lasiurus is a genus of Asian and African plants in the grass family, Poaceae, found primarily in arid regions. The only known species is Lasiurus scindicus, native to drier regions of northern Africa and southwestern Asia, from Mali, Morocco, and the Levant, all the way to India.

formerly included

see Loxodera

- Lasiurus epectinatus – Loxodera caespitosa
- Lasiurus maitlandii – Loxodera ledermannii
