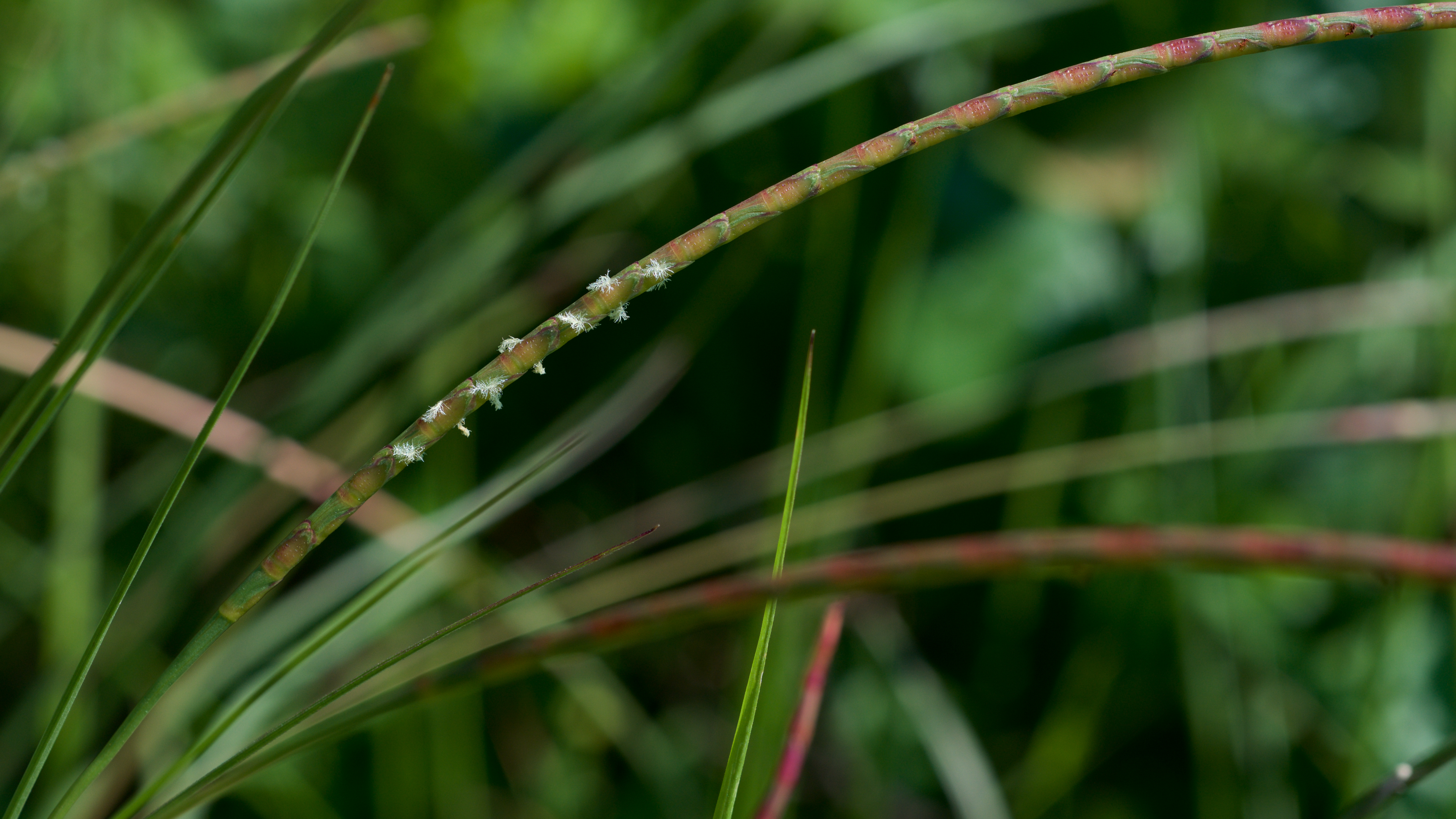

Conservation status
- Apparently Secure (NatureServe)

Scientific classification
- Kingdom: Plantae
- Clade: Embryophytes
- Clade: Tracheophytes
- Clade: Angiosperms
- Clade: Monocots
- Clade: Commelinids
- Order: Poales
- Family: Poaceae
- Subfamily: Panicoideae
- Tribe: Andropogoneae
- Subtribe: Rottboelliinae
- Genus: Rottboellia
- Species: R. campestris

Binomial name
- Rottboellia campestris Nutt.

Synonyms
- Coelorachis cylindrica (Michx.) Nash; Manisuris campestris (Nutt.) Hitchc.; Ischaemum scariosum Walter; Manisuris cylindrica (Michx.) Kuntze; Mnesithea cylindrica (Michx.) de Koning & Sosef; Rottboellia cylindrica (Michx.) Torr.; Tripsacum cylindricum Michx.

= Rottboellia campestris =

Species of flowering plant

Rottboellia campestris, synonyms including Coelorachis cylindrica and Mnesithea cylindrica, is a species of flowering plant in the grass family Poaceae. It is known by the common names cylinder jointtail grass, Carolina jointgrass, and pitted jointgrass. It is native to the southeastern United States.

== Description ==
This grass is a rhizomatous perennial with cylindrical stems growing up to 1.2 meters in height. They are clothed in the sheaths of the leaves. The inflorescence is cylindrical. The spikelets are pitted.

== Taxonomy ==
Synonyms include Tripsacum cylindricum, which was first described in 1803 by André Michaux. T. cylindricum was transferred to the genus Coelorachis in 1909 as C. cylindrica, and to the genus Mnesithea in 1986 as Mn. cylindrica.

The relationship between the genera Coelorachis, Mnesithea and Rottboellia varied as of November 2024. A 2015 classification of Poaceae treated Coelorachis as a synonym of Mnesithea, a view supported by a 2020 molecular phylogenetic study. This species is then accepted as Mnesithea cylindrica. Alternatively, Plants of the World Online, following Veldkamp et al. in 2013, treated the genus Coelorachis as a synonym of Rottboellia, with this species accepted as Rottboellia campestris.

== Habitat ==
This grass grows on tallgrass prairies, forest edges, and sometimes roadsides.
