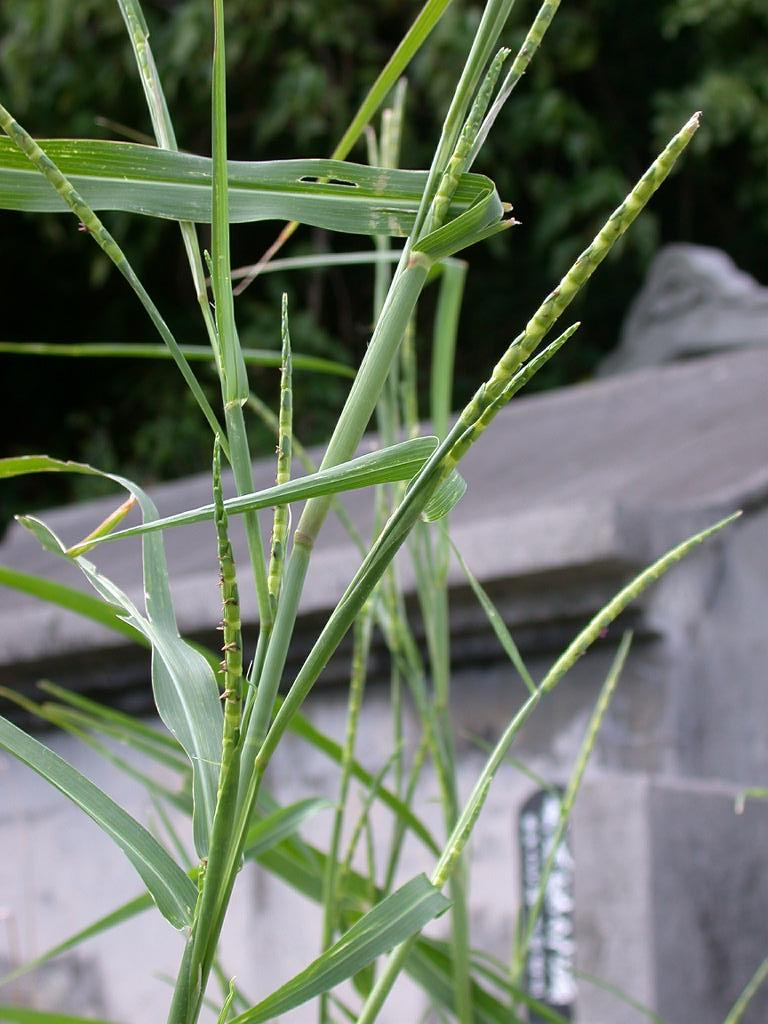

Scientific classification
- Kingdom: Plantae
- Clade: Tracheophytes
- Clade: Angiosperms
- Clade: Monocots
- Clade: Commelinids
- Order: Poales
- Family: Poaceae
- Subfamily: Panicoideae
- Genus: Rottboellia
- Species: R. cochinchinensis

Binomial name
- Rottboellia cochinchinensis (Lour.) Clayton

Synonyms
- Aegilops exaltata (L.); Aegilops fluviatilis Blanco; Manisuris exaltata (L.) Kuntze; Ophiuros exaltata (L.) Kuntze; Ophiuros appendiculatus Steud.; Rottboellia arundinacea Hochst. ex A.Rich.; Rottboellia corymbosa L.f.; Rottboellia denudata Steud.; Rottboellia exaltata (L.) L.f.; Rottboellia exaltata var. robusta Hook.f.; Rottboellia hispida Roxb. ex Hook.f.; Rottboellia setosa J.Presl; Stegosia cochinchinensis Lour.; Stegosia cochinchinensis var. robusta (Hook.f.) M.R.Almeida & S.Yadav; Stegosia exaltata (Kuntze) Nash

= Rottboellia cochinchinensis =

Species of grass

Rottboellia cochinchinensis is a species of flowering plant in the family Poaceae. This grass is known by the common names Itchgrass, Raoul grass, corngrass, Kokoma grass, Guinea-fowl grass, jointed grass, Shamwa grass and Kelly grass. It is a tall, tufted annual grass whose stems (culms) grow up to 3 metres (9 ft 10 in) in height with leaf-blades of up to 45 centimetres (1 ft 6 in) in length. The species flowers at the apex of culms in the form of spike-like racemes composed of paired spikelets. The common name Itchgrass comes from the bristly (hispid) leaf-sheath which can be irritating to the skin.

Rottboellia cochinchinensis is native to tropical Asia and Africa and has also been introduced to the Americas where it is often considered to be an invasive species. It is a major weed of a wide range of crops including maize, rice, sorghum and sugar cane.

== Description ==
Rottboellia cochinchinensis is an annual with prop roots supporting erect, laterally-branching culms which are usually between 30–300 cm in length, although up to 400 cm high culms have been described. Cauline leaves arise from hispid leaf-sheaths with irritating hairs, especially on the lower sheaths. The leaf-sheaths are as wide as the blade at the collar and have a truncated, membranous ligule of 1mm in length. The leaf blades are slightly rough (scabridulous) and are generally linear to linear-lanceolate, terminating in an acuminate apex. The leaves are usually between 15–45 cm long and 5-20mm wide, although larger dimensions of 80 cm long and 45mm wide have been suggested as upper limits.

The racemes of R. cochinensis are 3–15 cm long, cylindrical, hairless (glabrous), erect and are found on terminal and axillary culms. Each raceme is either embraced at the base by, or projects beyond, a leaf arising from an inflated leaf-sheath. The peduncle at the base of each raceme is rough and widens as it approaches its apex, where the raceme is divided by fragile nodes between each rachis. The rachides are strongly inflated at around 2–3.5mm wide and 5-7mm between each node and bear pairs of spikelets abaxially: one sterile and attached with a pedicel fused to the internode, the other fertile and attached directly (sessile). The raceme tapers off with a number of reduced, sterile spikelets at the apex, which form a false panicle as they appear to be much-branched.

The sterile, pedicelled spikelet in each pair is well developed at about 3-5mm long and is egg-shaped and dorsally flattened. The spikelet is enclosed by bracts called glumes which are hardened, smooth, obtuse, blunt, distinctly veined, glabrous and winged on the margins. The sterile spikelet is deciduous with the fertile spikelet, meaning they break off together with a central peg where the pair were attached transversely at each rachis node. The fertile, sessile spikelets are very similar to the sterile spikelets, being around 3.5-5mm long, ovate and dorsally flattened, although they are attached differently to the rachis. The glumes of these spikelets are dissimilar as the lower one is wider than the upper and is not winged, whereas the upper is V-shaped. The lower glume has 13 veins and is 2-keeled, unlike the upper which is 11-veined and singularly keeled. Both reach the apex of the florets but the lower glume apex is notched (emarginate) whereas the upper is acute.

As with most members of the Poaceae family, the fertile spikelets contain florets with two lodicules, fleshy scales which open the glumes during flowering. These lodicules are the same size as the 3 anthers present in the florets at 2mm long and within them are the female parts of the flower consisting of 2 stigmas. Also typically for the Poaceae, the fruit formed is a single seed fused to the pericarp called a caryopsis, although in R. cochinchinensis the pericarp becomes free with time. The caryopsis is 3.5mm in length with the embryo around half the total length. The hilum, the scar where the caryopsis attached to the placenta, is point-like (punctiform) and the endosperm is covered with a mealy powder (farinose). The caryopsis is then disseminated with the rachis internode and a structure called the eliastome (callus knob) still attached.

Rottboellia cochinchinensis has been found to vary in chromosome number, with diploid cells having either 20, 36, 40 or 60 chromosomes, so either x=10 or sometimes x=9 are common basic numbers.

== Etymology ==
The genus Rottboellia was named in honour of the Danish botanist Christen Friis Rottbøll (1727–1797) by Carl Linnaeus the Younger in 1781 in the publication Supplementum Plantarum. The species epithet cochinchinensis traces its etymology back to the basionym Stegosia cochinchinensis, which was used by João de Loureiro to denote the specimen he described being from Cochinchina, now part of Vietnam.

Clayton proposed the name Rottboellia cochinchinensis as a new combination for the species named Rottboellia exaltata, now as synonym of R. cochinchinensis. Due to a mistake by Linnaeus the Younger and the strict laws of nomenclature, the widely used R. exaltata combination had to be controversially discarded.

== Habitat and ecology ==
Rottboellia cochinchinensis uses C4 carbon fixation during photosynthesis and as such is mostly found in warm tropical climates with high sunlight, generally in the tropics and between the northern and southern 20 °C isotherms. Carbon fixation by this pathway allows plants to avoid the wasteful process of photorespiration and as such confers a competitive advantage to species such as R. cochinchinensis in high light intensity, high heat and low humidity conditions over C3 plants.

The species can be found in a diverse array of habitats including grassland and marginal land, as well as being a major weed of perennial and rotation crops across the tropics. Globally there are least 18 crop species where R. cochinchinensis is considered an important weed including sugarcane (Saccharum), maize (Zea), upland rice (Oryza), cotton (Gossypium), soy (Glycine), Sorghum and peanuts (Arachis). Asian countries such as India do not seem to suffer from R. cochinchinensis as such a serious weed, suggesting that certain biotypes of the species are more vigorously competitive with crops than others.

Rottboellia cochinchinensis is relatively shade tolerant, and also able to grow rapidly under high light exposure. The species is usually found at altitudes up to 2300m, with low temperatures often being the limiting factor above this, and favours acidic soils.

It flowers all year long in tropical climates, but during July and August in the US and is a prodigious seed producer, sometimes producing over 2000 seeds per plant (although not all would be viable) and over 650 kg per hectare. Seed germination patterns are unclear and vary across the pantropical distribution of R. cochinchinensis, and recent research is aiming to better understand seedling emergence patterns in order to inform control regimes. They are dispersed by floodwater, birds, small mammals and latterly by humans and vehicles. The eliastome (callus knob) which is disseminated with the caryopsis, contains oils which may attract ants and aid dispersal.

== Distribution ==
The natural distribution of R. cochinchinensis is somewhat unclear as the species seems to have been very successful at growing its range. Most sources assume the species is native to South-East Asia, as it was first described from specimens found in this area, although some sources cite India. It is now pantropical in distribution, being found across the Old World tropics from southern Asia, Sub-Saharan Africa, Madagascar and Indonesia to New Guinea and the Solomon Islands, and Australia as far as Queensland, with one georeferenced record from New South Wales. In addition, it has been widely introduced across the tropical Americas, possibly first to Cuba or Brazil but rapidly spreading across the Caribbean, southern United States and across tropical Central and South America. Introductions are speculated to have originated from the transportation of crop products and agricultural and forestry machinery, or even intentionally introduced for grazing in the Caribbean

== Taxonomy and systematics ==
The taxonomic classification of Rottboellia cochinchinensis is largely still based on the work of Clayton and Renvoize in 1986, who placed the genus within the Andropogoneae tribe of the Panicoideae, which is a subfamily within the Grasses (Family: Poaceae). The tribe was defined morphologically by many characters including fragile racemes, subtended by a leaf-sheath, which bear pairs spikelets, one fertile and sessile and the other pedicelled and barren. Like many members of the tribe, the pairs of spikelets in R. cochinchinensis fall together with the internode at maturity. From this classification, the genus Rottboellia was thought to have evolved from a common ancestor with the Phacelurus and Coelorachis genera, with Rottboellia forming a sister clade to Zea. Clayton and Renvoize also recognised a subtribe Rottboelliinae which included the genera Coelorachis, Hackelochloa, Hemarthria and Elionurus, amongst others

More recent evaluations of the Andropogoneae. have found evolutionary relationships between the constituent genera more difficult to tease out. Phylogenetic methodologies have experienced difficulties in resolving evolutionary relationships within the tribe, and have pointed to rapid basal radiation and/or frequent hybridisation within the clade as possible causes. However, the merger of the genera Rottboellia and Coelorachis has been well supported. Skendzic et al. (2007) also has Hackelochloa, Hemarthria and Elionurus as sister genera within Rottboelliinea sensu Clayton and Renvoize (1986)

== Additional information ==
Archaeological evidence of a Rottboellia cochinchinensis caryopsis from an Early Iron Age site on the Lulonga River in the Democratic Republic of Congo was found in the early 2010s, possibly suggesting the species native distribution covers the Old World Tropics. African communities have been known to use leaves and culms to produce mats.
