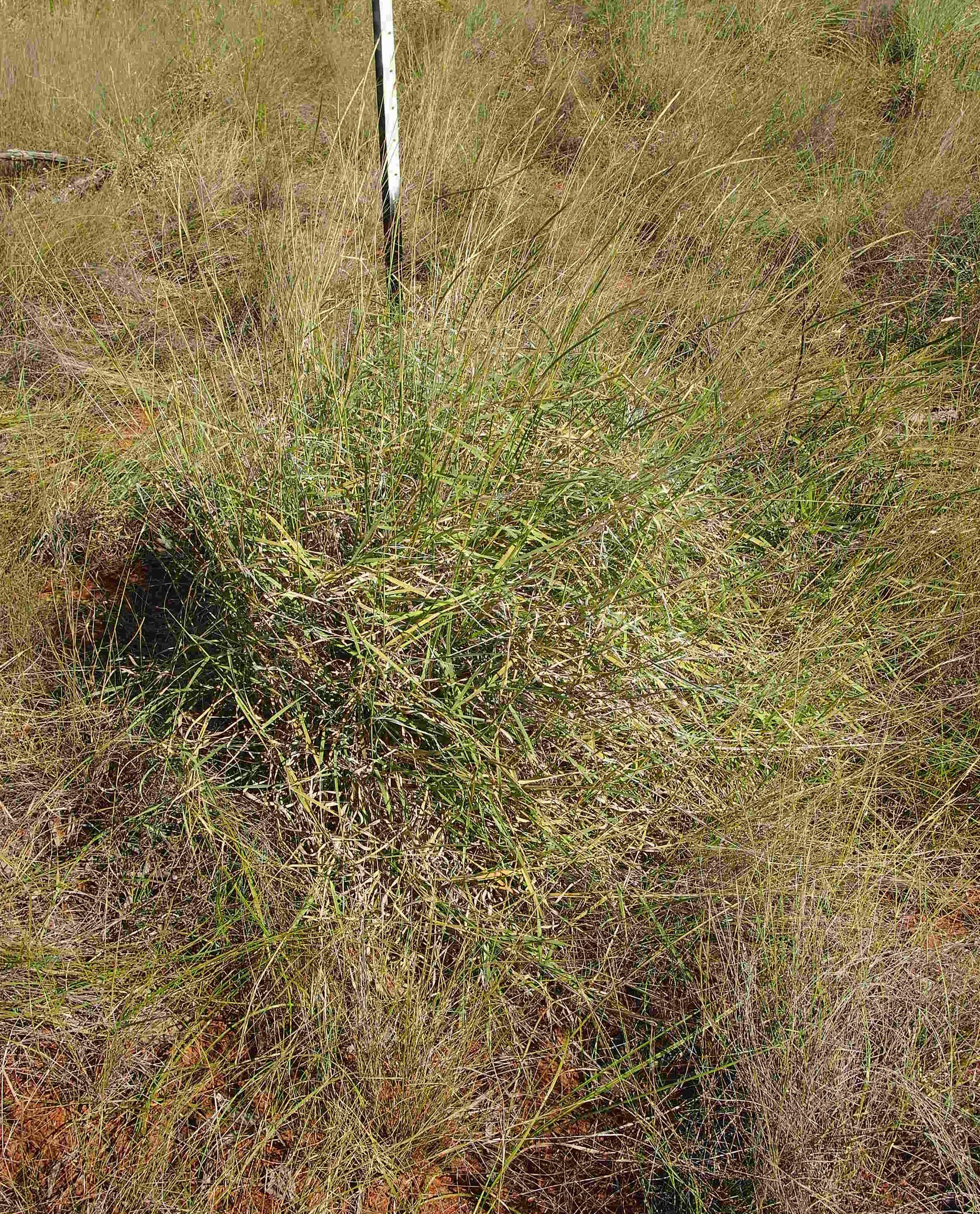
- Mnesithea formosa

Scientific classification
- Kingdom: Plantae
- Clade: Tracheophytes
- Clade: Angiosperms
- Clade: Monocots
- Clade: Commelinids
- Order: Poales
- Family: Poaceae
- Subfamily: Panicoideae
- Supertribe: Andropogonodae
- Tribe: Andropogoneae
- Subtribe: Rottboelliinae
- Genus: Mnesithea; Kunth

Type species
- Mnesithea laevis (Retz.) Kunth

Synonyms
- (For the broad circumscription): Coelorachis auct. non Brongn.; Hackelochloa Kuntze; Apogonia (Nutt.) E. Fourn.; Cycloteria Stapf; Diperium Desv.; Peltophorus Desv.; Rytilix Raf. ex Hitchc.; Thyridostachyum Nees

= Mnesithea =

Jointtail grass

Genus of grasses

Mnesithea, or jointtail grass, is a genus of Asian, Australian, and Pacific Island plants in the grass family. The number of species placed in the genus varied considerably as of November 2024 depending in large part on how the genus Coelorachis was treated. Sources that synonymized Coelorachis with Mnesithea accepted about 26 species. Those that synonymized Coelorachis with Rottboellia accepted about seven.

== Taxonomy ==
The genus Mnesithea was erected by Carl Sigismund Kunth in 1829. The circumscription of the genus varied as of November 2024. A 2015 classification of Poaceae treated Coelorachis as a synonym of Mnesithea. This treatment was supported by Welker et al. in 2020, based on a molecular phylogenetic study, and was used by the Germplasm Resources Information Network and the Integrated Taxonomic Information System. In this circumscription, the genus has about 26 species including those formerly placed in Coelorachis. Alternatively, Plants of the World Online, following Veldkamp et al. in 2013, treated Coelorachis as a synonym of Rottboellia, with only seven species in the genus Mnesithea.

=== Species ===
Seven species were accepted in the narrow circumscription as of November 2024:

- Mnesithea annua (Lazarides) de Koning & Sosef - Western Australia
- Mnesithea formosa (R.Br.) de Koning & Sosef - Lesser Sunda Islands, New Guinea, Western Australia, Northern Territory, Queensland
- Mnesithea laevis (Retz.) Kunth - Fujian, Guangdong, Guangxi, Hainan, Taiwan, Japan incl Nansei-shotō, India, Indonesia, Pakistan, Philippines, Sri Lanka, Thailand, Vietnam; Pacific Islands
- Mnesithea mollicoma (Hance) A.Camus - Guangdong, Guangxi, Thailand, Vietnam, Palawan, Java, Malaysia, Philippines, Sulawesi
- Mnesithea pilosa B.K.Simon - Queensland
- Mnesithea thailandica Traiperm & Boonkerd - Thailand
- Mnesithea veldkampii Potdar, S.P.Gaikwad, Salunkhe & S.R.Yadav - Maharashtra

Further species accepted when Coelorachis is synonymized with Mnesithea include the following, which other sources place in Rottboellia:

- Mnesithea afraurita (Stapf) de Koning & Sosef (= Coelorachis afraurita)
- Mnesithea aurita (Steud.) de Koning & Sosef (= Coelorachis aurita)
- Mnesithea balansae (Hack.) de Koning & Sosef (= Coelorachis balansae)
- Mnesithea cancellata (Ridl.) Ridl. (= Coelorachis cancellata)
- Mnesithea capensis (Stapf) de Koning & Sosef (= Coelorachis capensis)
- Mnesithea clarkei (Hack.) de Koning & Sosef (= Coelorachis clarkei)
- Mnesithea cylindrica (Michx.) de Koning & Sosef (= Coelorachis cylindrica)
- Mnesithea geminata (Hack.) Ridl. (= Coelorachis geminata)
- Mnesithea glandulosa (Trin.) de Koning & Sosef (= Coelorachis glandulosa)
- Mnesithea helferi (Hook.f.) de Koning & Sosef (= Coelorachis helferi)
- Mnesithea impressa (Griseb.) de Koning & Sosef (= Coelorachis impressa)
- Mnesithea khasiana (Hack.) de Koning & Sosef (= Coelorachis khasiana)
- Mnesithea laevispica (Keng) de Koning & Sosef (= Coelorachis laevispica)
- Mnesithea lepidura (Stapf) de Koning & Sosef (= Coelorachis lepidura)
- Mnesithea parodiana (Henrard) de Koning & Sosef (= Coelorachis parodiana)
- Mnesithea ramosa (E.Fourn.) de Koning & Sosef (= Coelorachis ramosa)
- Mnesithea rottboellioides (R.Br.) de Koning & Sosef (= Coelorachis rottboellioides)
- Mnesithea rugosa (Nutt.) de Koning & Sosef (= Coelorachis rugosa)
- Mnesithea selloana (Hack.) de Koning & Sosef (= Coelorachis selloana)
- Mnesithea striata (Nees ex Steud.) de Koning & Sosef (= Coelorachis striata)
- Mnesithea tessellata (Steud.) de Koning & Sosef (= Coelorachis tessellata)
- Mnesithea tuberculosa (Nash) de Koning & Sosef (= Coelorachis tuberculosa)
