= Loxodera =

Scientific classification
- Kingdom: Plantae
- Clade: Tracheophytes
- Clade: Angiosperms
- Clade: Monocots
- Clade: Commelinids
- Order: Poales
- Family: Poaceae
- Subfamily: Panicoideae
- Supertribe: Andropogonodae
- Tribe: Andropogoneae
- Subtribe: Rottboelliinae
- Genus: Loxodera; Launert

Type species
- Loxodera rigidiuscula (syn of L. bovonei) Launert

Synonyms
- Lepargochloa Launert

Genus of grasses

Loxodera is a genus of African plants in the grass family.

Species

- Loxodera bovonei (Chiov.) Launert - Zaïre, Zambia
- Loxodera caespitosa (C.E.Hubb.) B.K.Simon - Tanzania, Zambia, Zimbabwe
- Loxodera ledermannii (Pilg.) Launert - Benin, Niger, Nigeria, Cameroon, Uganda
- Loxodera rhytachnoides (Launert) Clayton - Angola
- Loxodera strigosa (Gledhill) Clayton - Sierra Leone
