= Weeping lovegrass =

Weeping lovegrass is a common name for two plants in the genus Eragrostis:

- Eragrostis parviflora, native to Australia and New Caledonia
- Eragrostis curvula, native to southern Africa
