= Mary A. E. Richards =

British botanist

- Born: Mary Alice Eleanor Stokes; 1885 near Dolgellau, Wales, UK
- Died: 1977 (aged 91–92); Wales, UK
- Known for: "A Contribution to the Flora of Merioneth." "Check List of the Flora of Mbala (Abercorn) and District"
- Spouse: Major Henry Richards (m. 1907; died 1942)
- Children: 3

Mary A. E. Richards (née Mary Alice Eleanor Stokes; 1885–1977) was a Welsh botanist.

== Biography ==
Born near Dolgellau, Wales, and mainly raised in Lichfield, Staffordshire, she took an early interest in natural history and studied botany part-time at Mason Science College (now University of Birmingham). She married Major Henry ("Harry") Richards in 1907 and traveled extensively, including visits to India, Malaysia, China, Japan, Canada, and the United States of America.

Richards had three children, was active in the local Brithdir Church (Church in Wales, Anglican Communion), turned her house into a Red Cross hospital during World War I, which earned her the Royal Red Cross medal, became Councillor on the Marioneth County Council, and botanized extensively, culminating in a co-authored publication entitled A Contribution to the Flora of Merioneth.

Widowed in 1942, she traveled in 1950, to Abercorn, Northern Rhodesia (now Mbala, Zambia), for a holiday with old friends who lived there. She requested equipment for collecting plants from Edgar Milne-Redhead at the Royal Botanic Gardens, Kew and vigorously began to collect herbarium specimens of African plants at the age of 65. She eventually settled in Zambia and collected about 27,000 herbarium specimens, including many new species and even new genera, including Richardsiella (Poaceae), which is named after her. She eventually published a "Check List of the Flora of Mbala (Abercorn) and District" with W. V. Morony in 1969 but was uncomfortable with the political changes in the newly independent Zambia and moved to Tanzania, spending much time with conservationist Desmond Vesey-Fitzgerald near Arusha National Park.

On the nomination of the first president of the independent Zambia, Dr. Kenneth Kaunda, Richards was appointed a Member of the Most Excellent Order of the British Empire. At age 89, she returned to Wales, where she died in 1977. She continued to botanize until one week after her ninetieth birthday.

On many of the labels of her plant specimens, she recorded herself as "Mrs. H. M. Richards" (for Mrs. Henry Meredyth Richards).
