= Eragrostis tremula =

Scientific classification
- Kingdom: Plantae
- Clade: Tracheophytes
- Clade: Angiosperms
- Clade: Monocots
- Clade: Commelinids
- Order: Poales
- Family: Poaceae
- Subfamily: Chloridoideae
- Genus: Eragrostis
- Species: E. tremula

Binomial name
- Eragrostis tremula Hochst. ex Steud.

Species of grass

Eragrostis tremula is an annual grass that is native to tropical Africa, India and Myanmar. It is found in sandy soils and abandoned cultivation.

== Description ==
Ascending culms can grow up to 75 centimeters.

== Uses ==
It is used as fodder for cattle and eaten in times of food scarcity.
