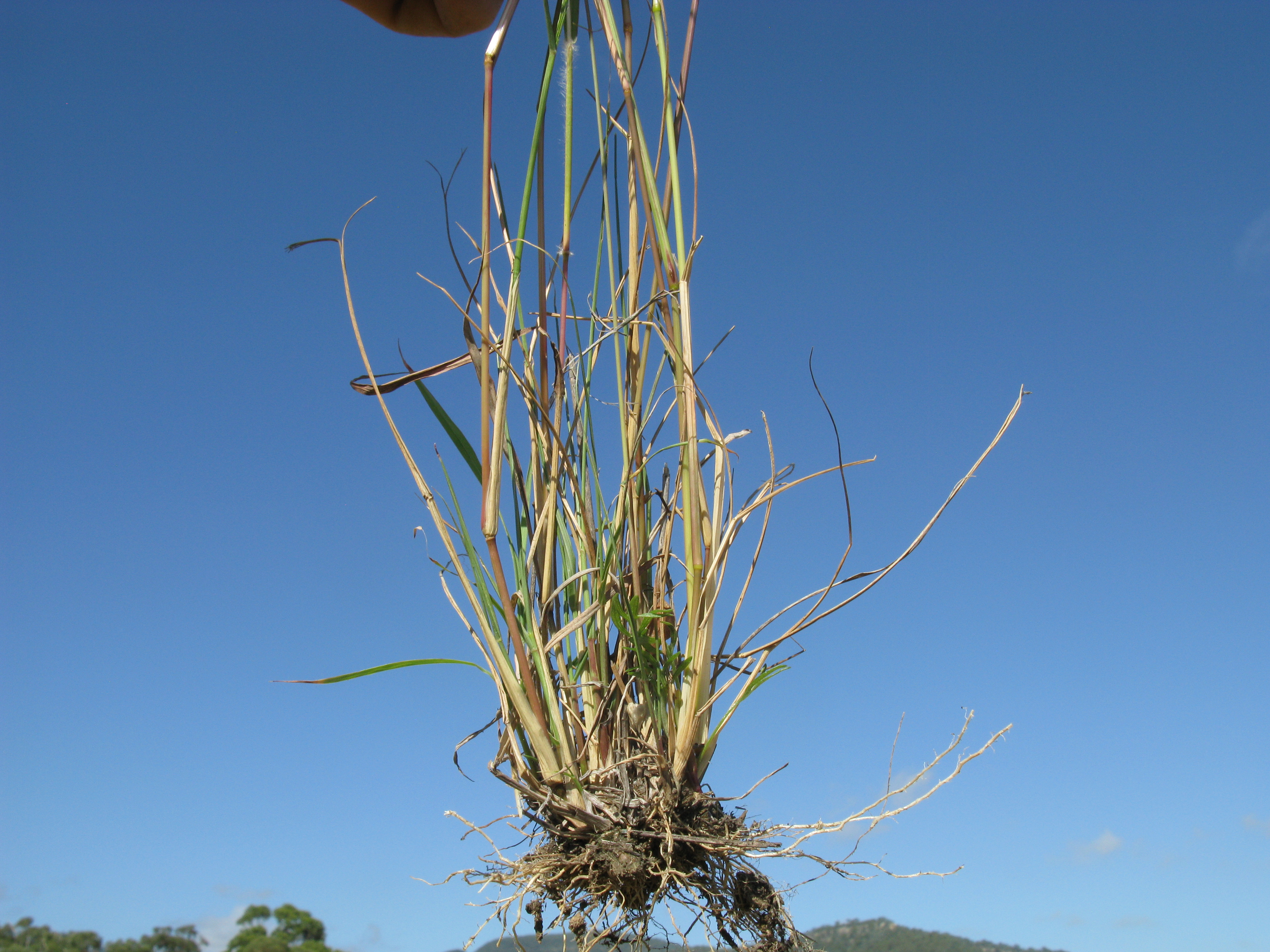

Scientific classification
- Kingdom: Plantae
- Clade: Tracheophytes
- Clade: Angiosperms
- Clade: Monocots
- Clade: Commelinids
- Order: Poales
- Family: Poaceae
- Subfamily: Chloridoideae
- Genus: Eragrostis
- Species: E. parviflora

Binomial name
- Eragrostis parviflora (R.Br.) Trin.

= Eragrostis parviflora =

Weeping lovegrass

Species of grass

Eragrostis parviflora is a widespread species of grass known as weeping lovegrass. Growing to 1.3 m (4 ft 3 in) metres tall, it may be found in many parts of Australia and New Caledonia. Leaves are strongly ribbed, hairless or with marginal hairs; the leaf blade may be flat or inrolled.
