= Tetrachaete =

Scientific classification
- Kingdom: Plantae
- Clade: Embryophytes
- Clade: Tracheophytes
- Clade: Spermatophytes
- Clade: Angiosperms
- Clade: Monocots
- Clade: Commelinids
- Order: Poales
- Family: Poaceae
- Subfamily: Chloridoideae
- Tribe: Eragrostideae
- Subtribe: Unioliinae
- Genus: Tetrachaete; Chiov. ex P.R.Pirotta
- Species: T. elionuroides

Binomial name
- Tetrachaete elionuroides Chiov.

Genus of grasses

Tetrachaete is a genus of plants in the grass family. The origin of the genus name is Greek, from tetra for "four" and chaite, for "bristle." There is only one known species, Tetrachaete elionuroides, native to Eritrea, Ethiopia, Somalia, Kenya, Tanzania, Yemen, and Oman.
