= Entoplocamia =

Scientific classification
- Kingdom: Plantae
- Clade: Tracheophytes
- Clade: Angiosperms
- Clade: Monocots
- Clade: Commelinids
- Order: Poales
- Family: Poaceae
- Subfamily: Chloridoideae
- Tribe: Eragrostideae
- Subtribe: Unioliinae
- Genus: Entoplocamia; Stapf
- Species: E. aristulata

Binomial name
- Entoplocamia aristulata (Hack. & Rendle ex Scott-Elliot) Stapf

Synonyms
- Tetrachne aristulata Hack. & Rendle ex Scott-Elliot; Entoplocamia benguellensis Rendle in W.P.Hiern; Entoplocamia procera Chiov.

Genus of grasses

Entoplocamia is a genus of African plants in the grass family. The only known species is Entoplocamia aristulata, native to Angola and Namibia.
