= Stiburus =

Scientific classification
- Kingdom: Plantae
- Clade: Embryophytes
- Clade: Tracheophytes
- Clade: Spermatophytes
- Clade: Angiosperms
- Clade: Monocots
- Clade: Commelinids
- Order: Poales
- Family: Poaceae
- Subfamily: Chloridoideae
- Tribe: Eragrostideae
- Subtribe: Eragrostidinae
- Genus: Stiburus; Stapf

Species
- Stiburus alopecuroides (Hack.) Stapf; Stiburus conrathii Hack.

Synonyms
- Triphlebia Stapf

Genus of grasses

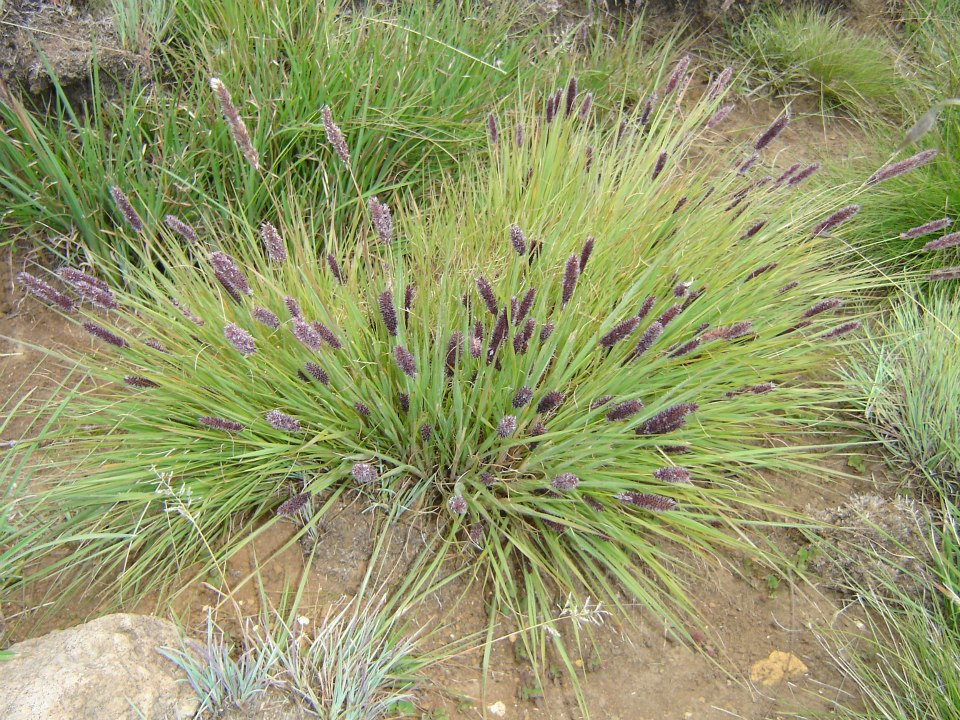
Stiburus alopecuroides in Natal Drakensberg, South Africa

Stiburus is a genus of plants in the family Poaceae. It is native to Zimbabwe and South Africa.

== Species ==
- Stiburus alopecuroides (Hack.) Stapf
- Stiburus conrathii Hack.
