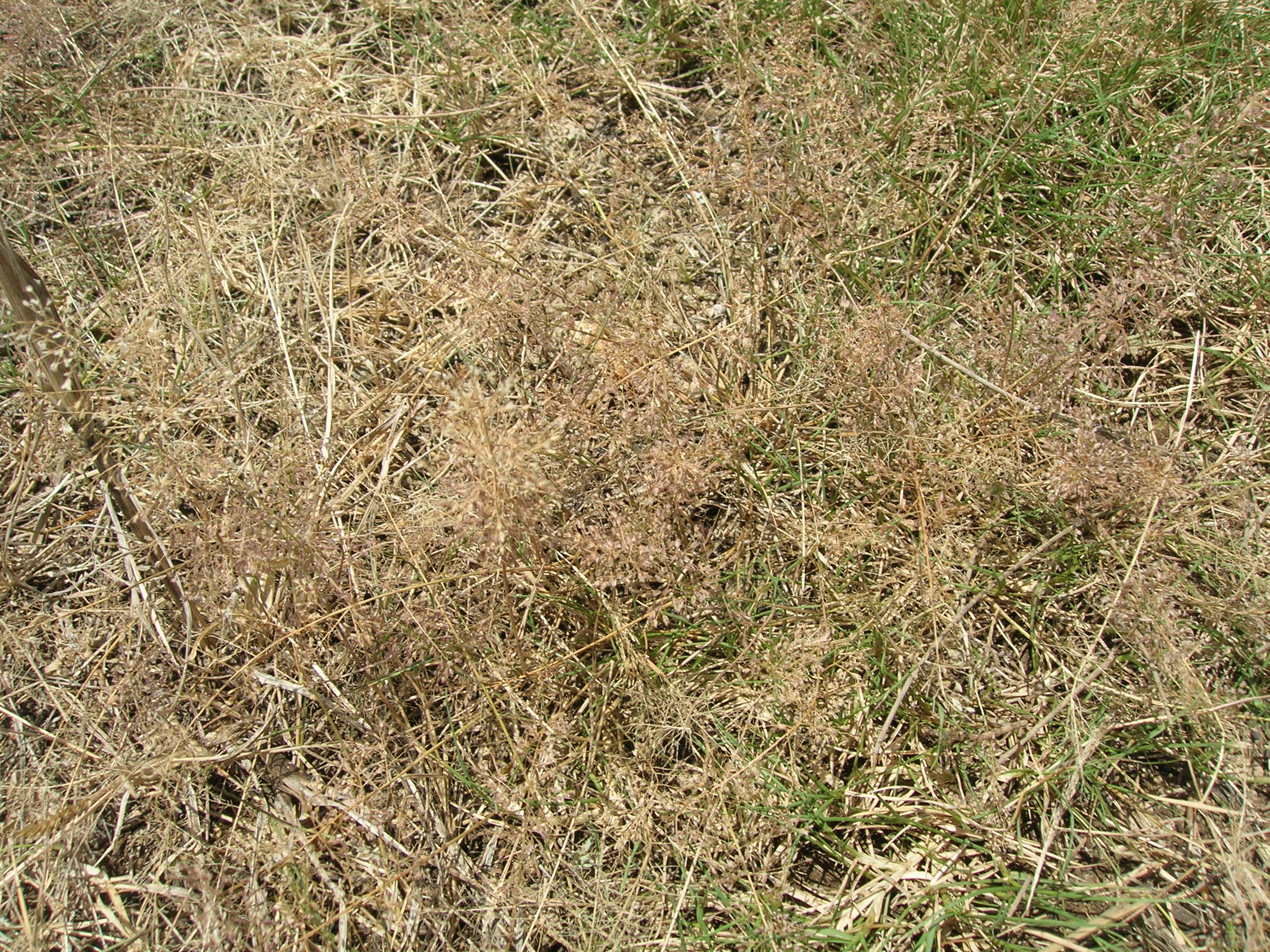

Scientific classification
- Kingdom: Plantae
- Clade: Tracheophytes
- Clade: Angiosperms
- Clade: Monocots
- Clade: Commelinids
- Order: Poales
- Family: Poaceae
- Subfamily: Chloridoideae
- Genus: Eragrostis
- Species: E. amabilis

Binomial name
- Eragrostis amabilis (L.) Wight & Arn. ex Nees

= Eragrostis amabilis =

Species of plant

Eragrostis amabilis is a bunchgrass, in the subfamily Chloridoideae of Poaceae, native to Africa and southern Asia. Synonymy includes: Eragrostis tenella Benth., Eragrostis elegans Nees, and Eragrostis interrupta Lam. Döll.

== Uses ==
Eragrostis amabilis is grown as a drought tolerant ornamental grass in gardens.
