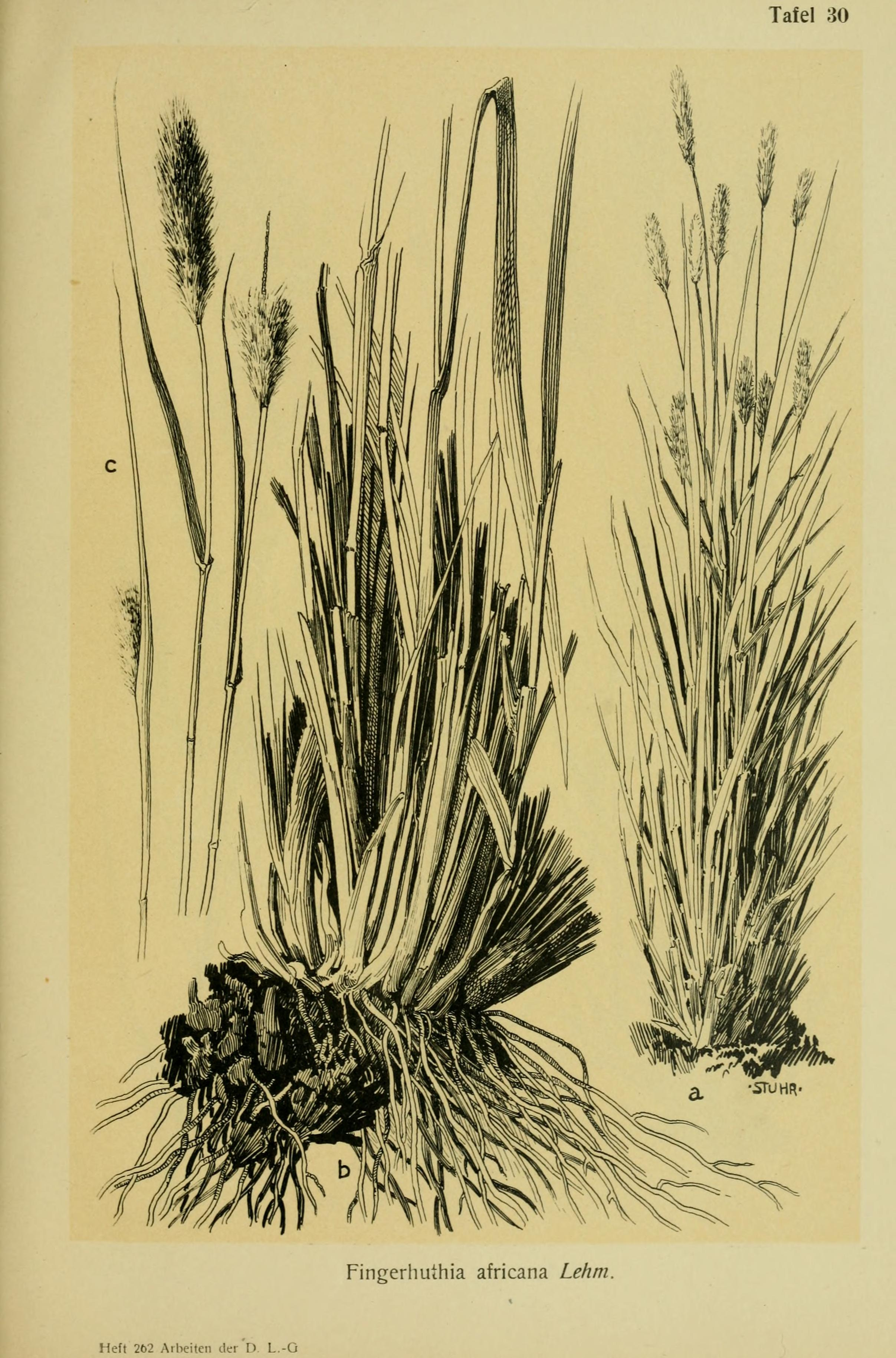
- Fingerhuthia africana

Scientific classification
- Kingdom: Plantae
- Clade: Tracheophytes
- Clade: Angiosperms
- Clade: Monocots
- Clade: Commelinids
- Order: Poales
- Family: Poaceae
- Subfamily: Chloridoideae
- Tribe: Eragrostideae
- Subtribe: Unioliinae
- Genus: Fingerhuthia; Nees ex Lehm.

Type species
- Fingerhuthia africana Nees ex Lehm.

= Fingerhuthia =

Genus of grasses

Fingerhuthia is a genus of Asian and African plants in the grass family. Common names are thimble grass and Zulu fescue.

Species

- Fingerhuthia africana Nees ex Lehm. - South Africa, Eswatini, Namibia, Angola, Zimbabwe, Mozambique, Saudi Arabia, Yemen, Oman, Pakistan, Afghanistan; naturalized in Pima County in Arizona in United States
- Fingerhuthia sesleriiformis Nees - South Africa, Lesotho, Namibia
