= Heterachne =

Scientific classification
- Kingdom: Plantae
- Clade: Tracheophytes
- Clade: Angiosperms
- Clade: Monocots
- Clade: Commelinids
- Order: Poales
- Family: Poaceae
- Subfamily: Chloridoideae
- Tribe: Eragrostideae
- Subtribe: Eragrostidinae
- Genus: Heterachne; Benth.

Type species
- Heterachne gulliveri Benth.

Genus of grass plants

Heterachne is a genus of Australian plants in the grass family.

Species

- Heterachne abortiva (R.Br.) Druce - Northern Territory, Queensland, Western Australia
- Heterachne baileyi C.E.Hubb. - Queensland
- Heterachne gulliveri Benth. - Northern Territory, Queensland, Western Australia
