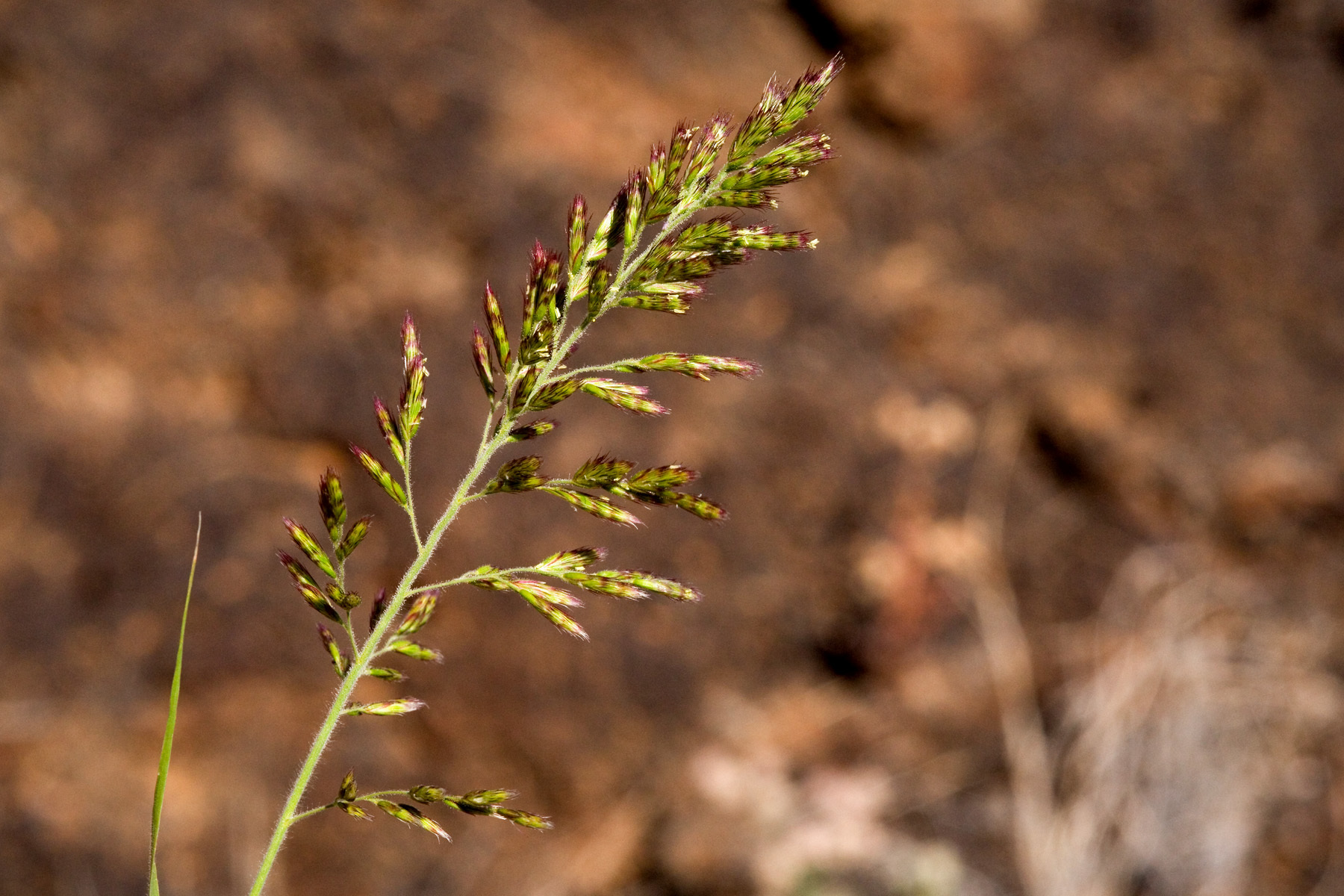

Scientific classification
- Kingdom: Plantae
- Clade: Tracheophytes
- Clade: Angiosperms
- Clade: Monocots
- Clade: Commelinids
- Order: Poales
- Family: Poaceae
- Subfamily: Chloridoideae
- Tribe: Eragrostideae
- Subtribe: Cotteinae
- Genus: Cottea; Kunth
- Species: C. pappophoroides

Binomial name
- Cottea pappophoroides Kunth

= Cottea =

Genus of grasses

Cottea is a genus of plants in the grass family native to North and South America. There is only one known species, Cottea pappophoroides, native to the southwestern United States (southern Arizona, southern New Mexico, western Texas), Mexico, Ecuador, Peru, Bolivia, and Argentina. (The name Cottea sarmentosa was coined in 1854 for a species now known as Enneapogon desvauxii.)
