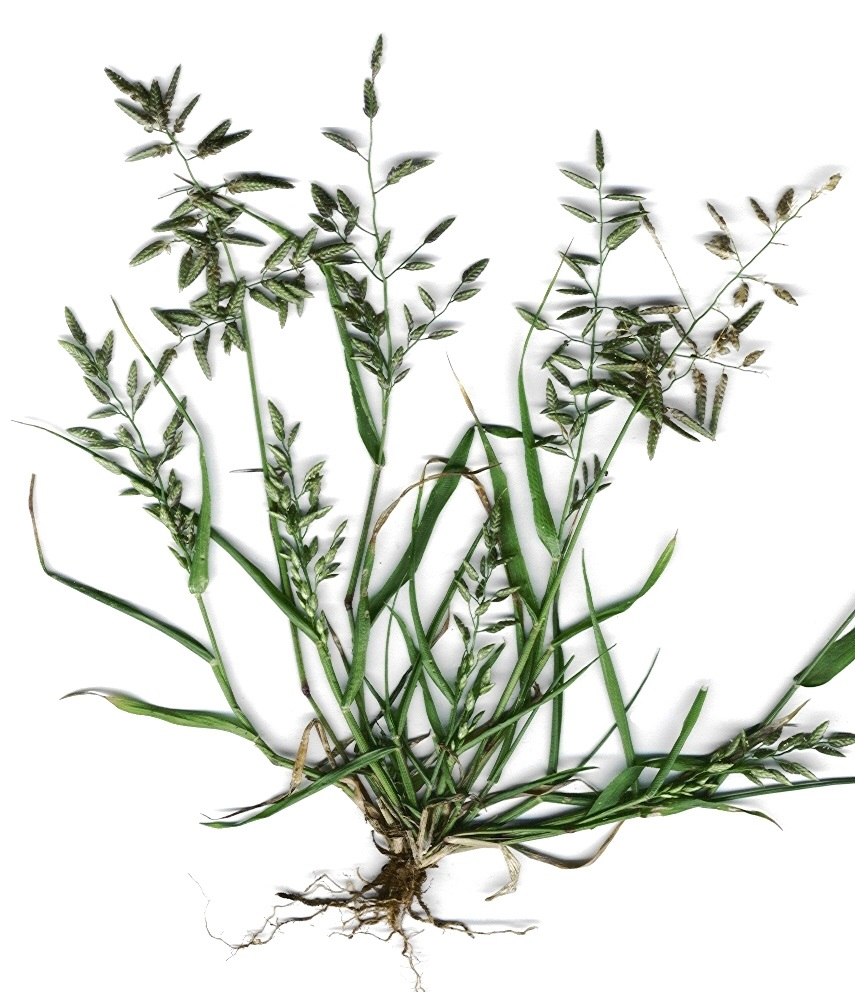
- Eragrostis cilianensis Maui, Hawai'i

Scientific classification
- Kingdom: Plantae
- Clade: Tracheophytes
- Clade: Angiosperms
- Clade: Monocots
- Clade: Commelinids
- Order: Poales
- Family: Poaceae
- Subfamily: Chloridoideae
- Tribe: Eragrostideae
- Subtribe: Eragrostidinae
- Genus: Eragrostis; Wolf

Type species
- Eragrostis eragrostis (syn of E. cilianensis) (L.) Wolf

Synonyms
- Acamptoclados Nash; Boriskellera Terechov; Diandrochloa De Winter; Erochloe Raf.; Erosion Lunell; Macroblepharus Phil.; Neeragrostis Bush; Psilantha (K.Koch) Tzvelev; Roshevitzia Tzvelev

= Eragrostis =

Genus of grasses

Eragrostis is a large and widespread genus of plants in the grass family, found in many countries on all inhabited continents and many islands.

Eragrostis is commonly known as lovegrass or canegrass. The name of the genus is derived from the Greek words ἔρως (érōs), meaning 'love', and ἄγρωστις (ágrōstis), meaning 'grass'.

Lovegrass is commonly used as livestock fodder. The seeds appear to be of high nutritional value for some animals, but they are also very tiny and collecting them for human food is cumbersome and hence uncommon. A notable exception is teff (E. tef), which is used to make traditional breads on the Horn of Africa, such as Ethiopian injera and Somalian laxoox. It is a crop of commercial importance. E. clelandii and E. tremula are recorded as famine foods in Australia and Chad, respectively.

Other species, such as E. amabilis, are used as ornamental plants. E. cynosuroides is used in the pūjā rites in the Hindu temple at Karighatta. Bahia lovegrass (E. bahiensis) is known as a hyperaccumulator of caesium-137 and can be grown to remove the highly toxic radioactive atoms from the environment. Weeping lovegrass (E. curvula) has been planted extensively to prevent soil erosion.

Seed dispersal is often done by passing animals; the grains' hooks latch on to fur or hair, or to clothes. Others are wind or gravity dispersed. Several herbivores feed on lovegrass, including invertebrates such as the caterpillars of the Zabulon skipper (Lon zabulon) and vertebrates. The extinct bluebuck (Hippotragus leucophaeus) was known to graze these grasses. The dense bunches also provide cover for small animals such as the rare Botteri's sparrow (Aimophila botterii). Lovegrasses may be important groundcover on oceanic islands like Laysan, where other plants are rare.

== Taxonomy ==
Eragrostis is the type genus of the tribe Eragrostideae.

Formerly included

Many species now considered better suited to other genera, including Cladoraphis Coelachyrum Desmazeria Diplachne Ectrosia Festuca Harpachne Poa etc.

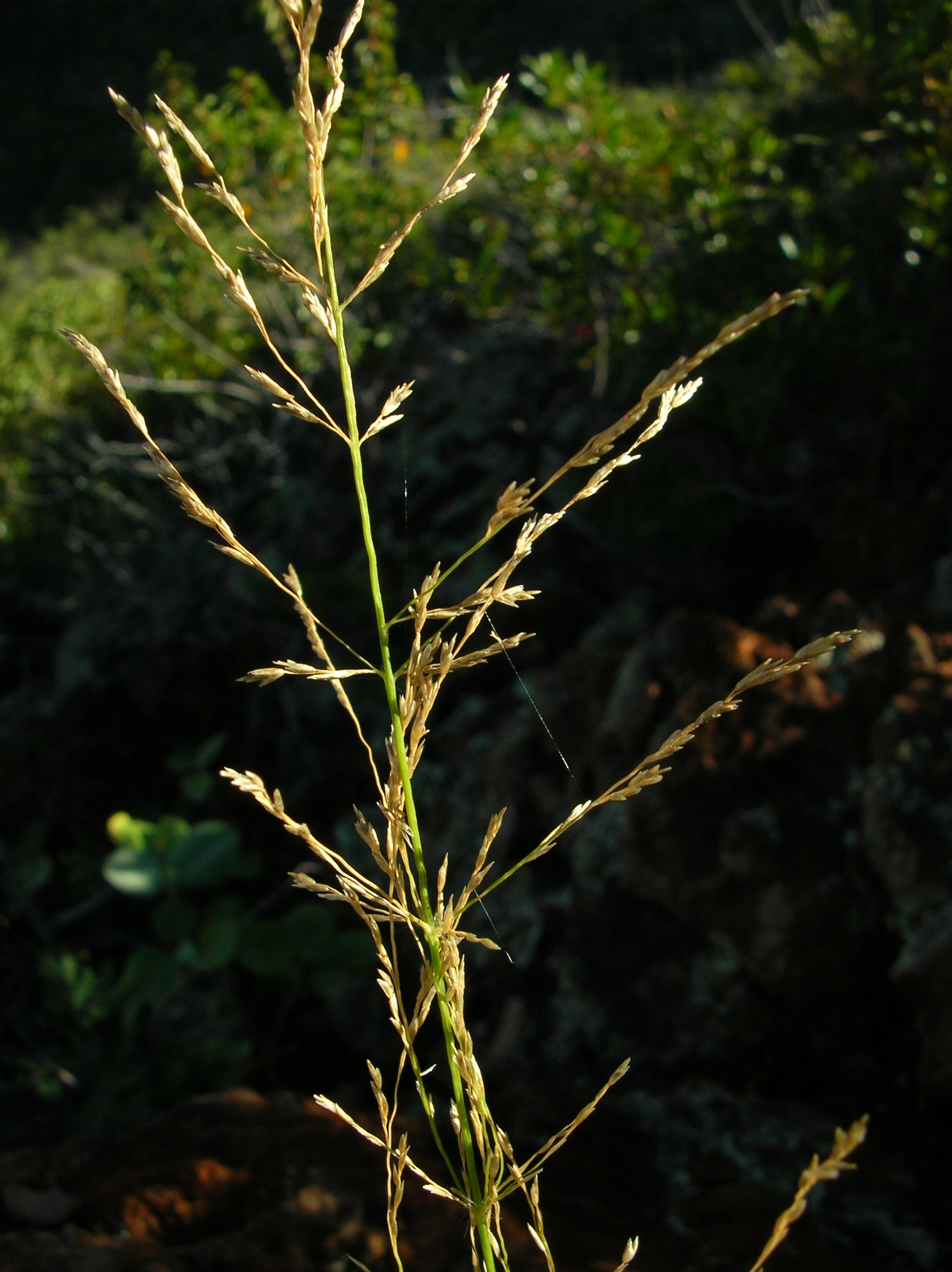
Eragrostis atropioides flowers

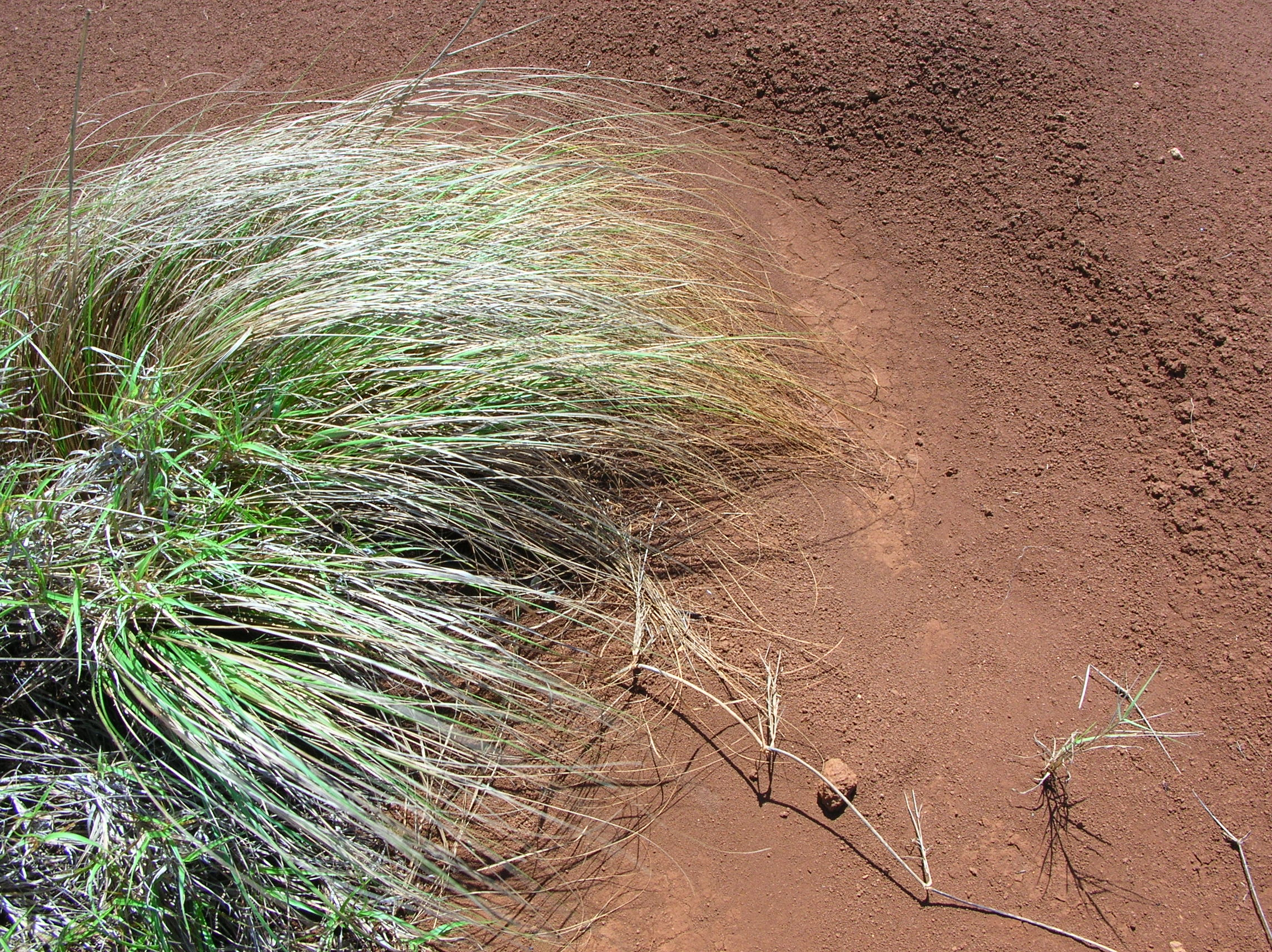
Weeping lovegrass (Eragrostis curvula)

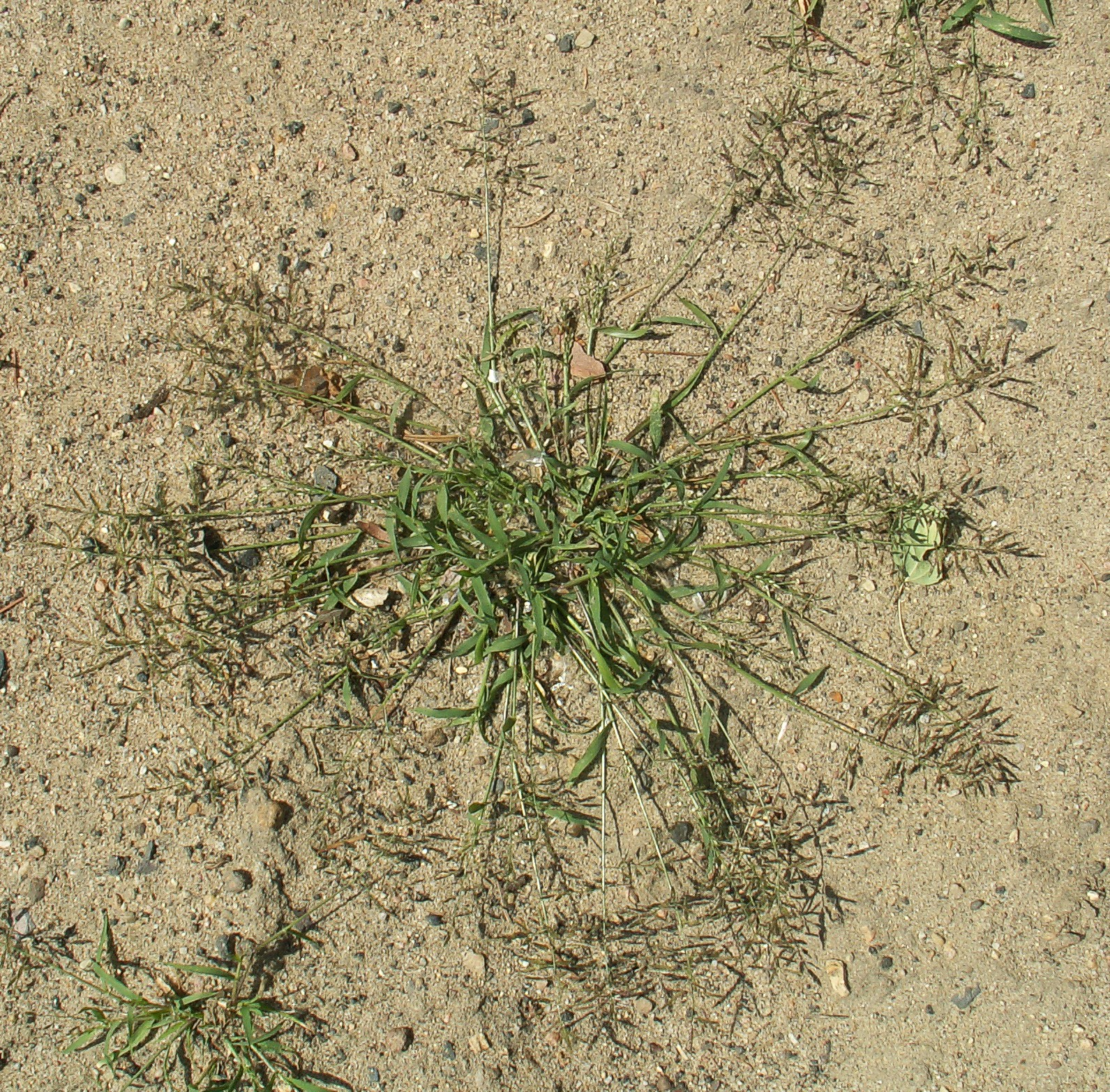
Little lovegrass (Eragrostis minor)

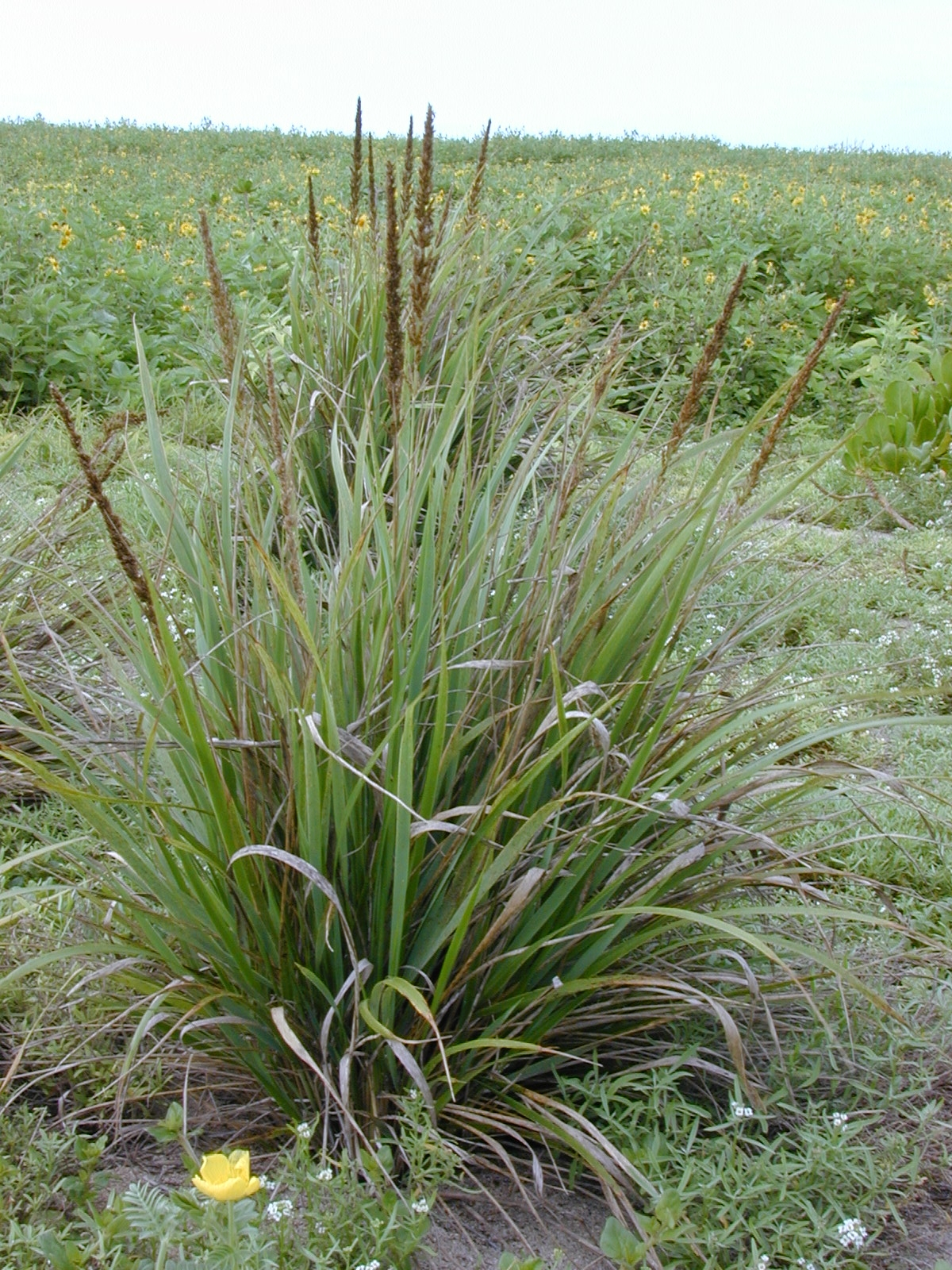
Eragrostis variabilis

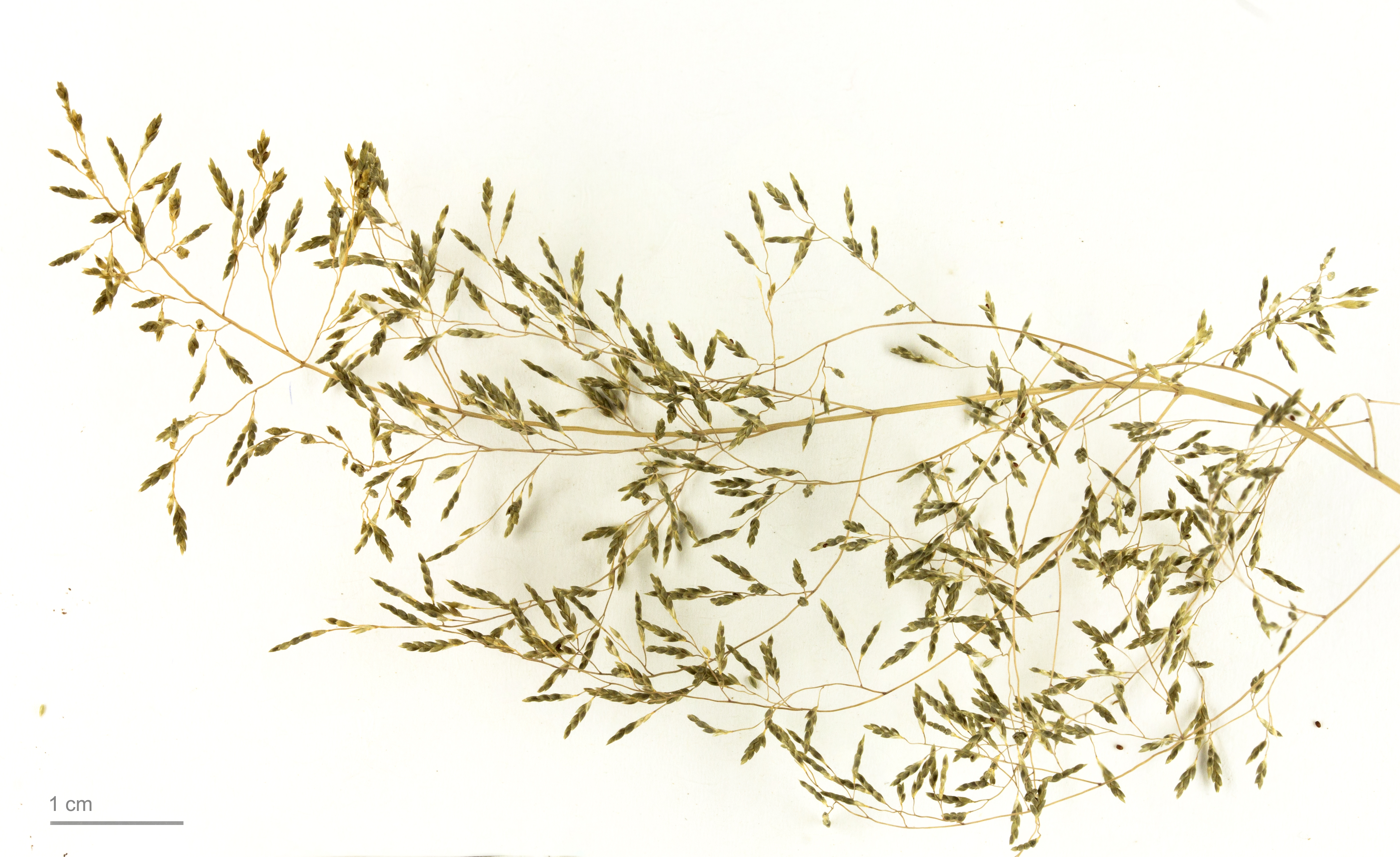
Eragrostis virescens - MHNT
