= Viguierella =

Scientific classification
- Kingdom: Plantae
- Clade: Tracheophytes
- Clade: Angiosperms
- Clade: Monocots
- Clade: Commelinids
- Order: Poales
- Family: Poaceae
- Subfamily: Chloridoideae
- Tribe: Eragrostideae
- Subtribe: Eragrostidinae
- Genus: Viguierella; A.Camus
- Species: V. madagascariensis

Binomial name
- Viguierella madagascariensis A.Camus

Genus of grasses

Viguierella is a genus of Madagascan plants in the grass family. The only known species is Viguierella madagascariensis.
