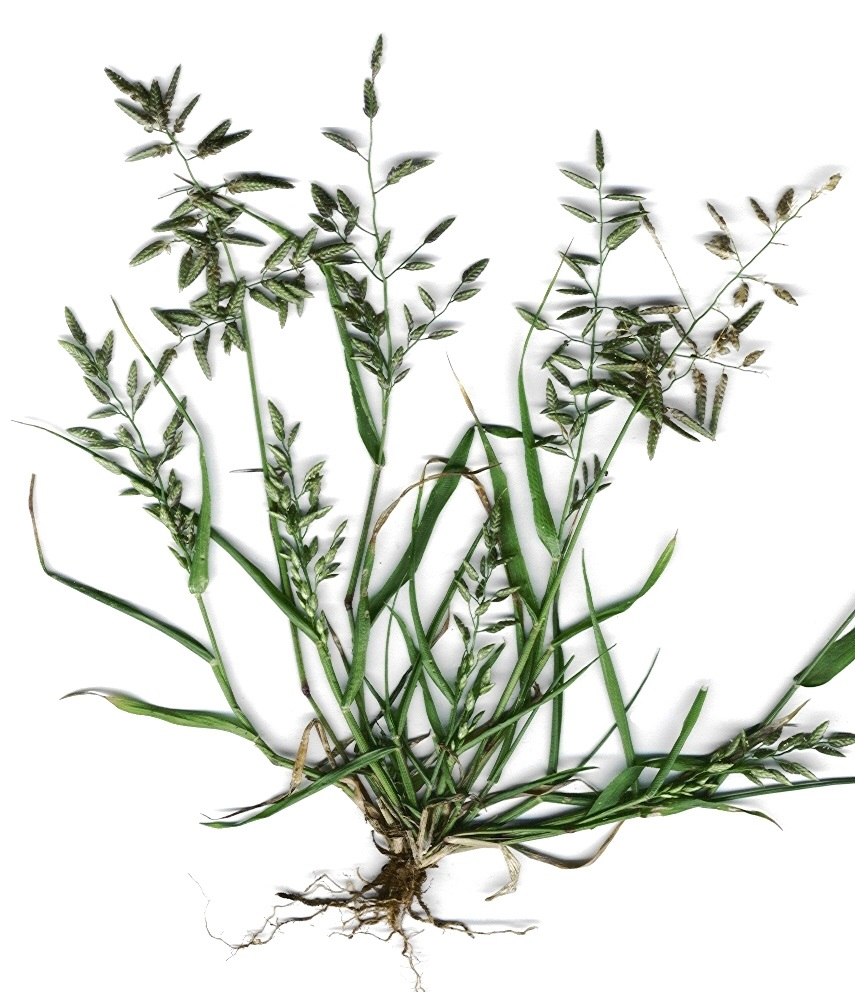
- Eragrostis cilianensis

Scientific classification
- Kingdom: Plantae
- Clade: Tracheophytes
- Clade: Angiosperms
- Clade: Monocots
- Clade: Commelinids
- Order: Poales
- Family: Poaceae
- Subfamily: Chloridoideae
- Tribe: Eragrostideae; Stapf (1898)

Genera
- 14 genera, see text

Synonyms
- supertribe Eragrostodae L. Liu (1980); Unioleae Roshev. ex C.S. Campb. (1985)

= Eragrostideae =

Tribe of grasses

Eragrostideae is a tribe of grasses in subfamily Chloridoideae. It contains roughly 500 species, which all use the C_{4} photosynthetic pathway.

The 14 genera are classified in three subtribes:

Cotteinae Reeder (1965)
- Cottea
- Enneapogon
- Kaokochloa
- Schmidtia
Unioliinae Clayton (1982)
- Entoplocamia
- Fingerhuthia
- Tetrachaete
- Tetrachne
- Uniola (syn. Leptochloopsis)
Eragrostidinae J. Presl (1830)
- Cladoraphis
- Eragrostis (syn. Acamptoclados, Catalepis, Diandrochloa, Ectrosia, Ectrosiopsis, Harpachne, Heterachne, Neeragrostis, Planichloa, Pogonarthria, Psammagrostis, Viguierella)
- Richardsiella
- Steirachne
- Stiburus (syn. Triphlebia)
