= Steirachne =

Scientific classification
- Kingdom: Plantae
- Clade: Tracheophytes
- Clade: Angiosperms
- Clade: Monocots
- Clade: Commelinids
- Order: Poales
- Family: Poaceae
- Subfamily: Chloridoideae
- Tribe: Eragrostideae
- Subtribe: Eragrostidinae
- Genus: Steirachne; Ekman

Type species
- Steirachne diandra Ekman

Genus of grasses

Steirachne is a genus of South American plants in the grass family.

Species

- Steirachne barbata (Trin.) Renvoize - Brazil (Bahia, Goiás, Mato Grosso, Pará, Minas Gerais), Guyana (Rupununi), Venezuela (Guárico, Apure, Bolívar)
- Steirachne diandra Ekman - Brazil (Pará, Ceará, Rio Grande do Norte, Maranhão), Venezuela (Guárico, Apure, Bolívar)
