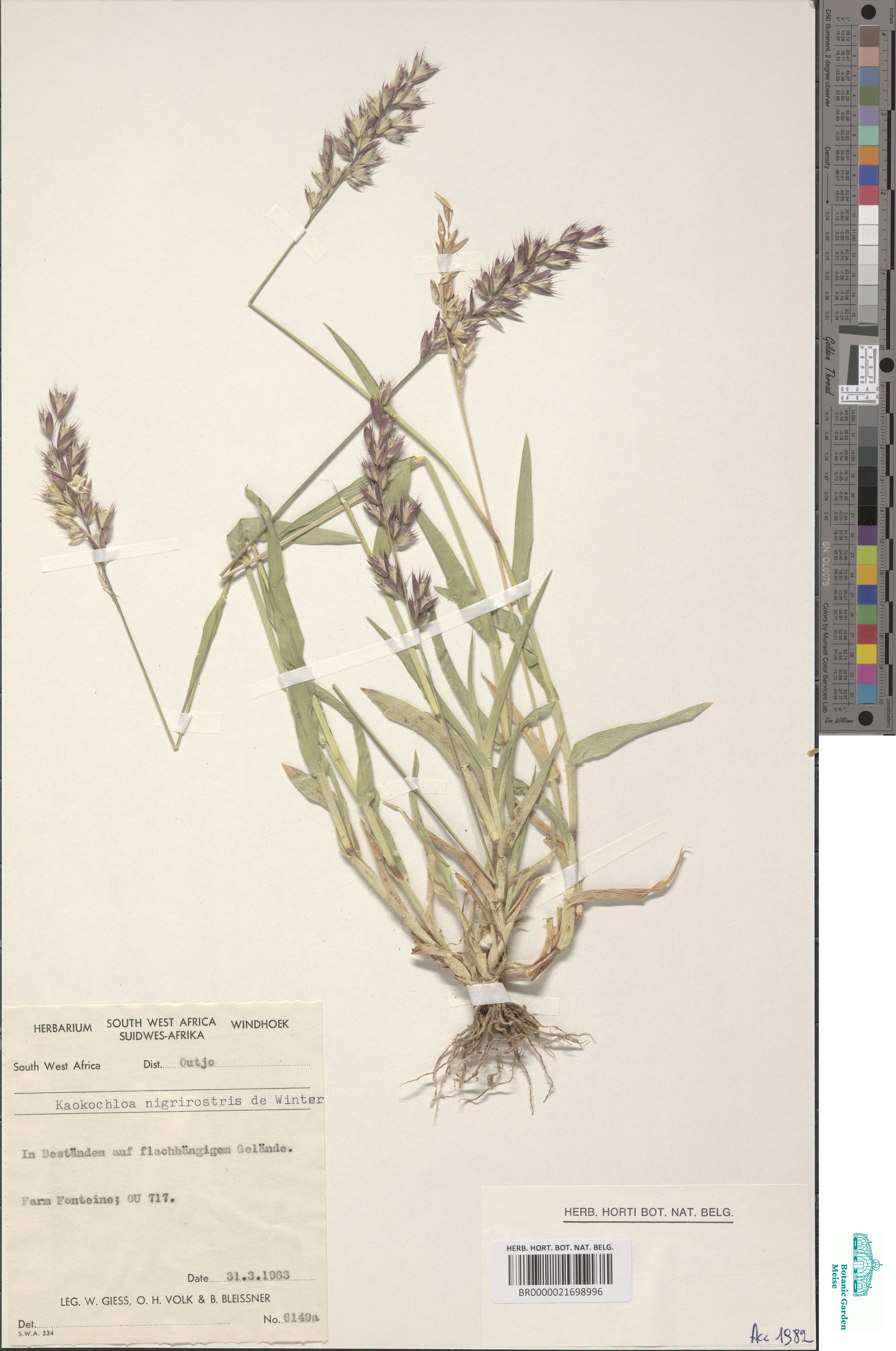

Scientific classification
- Kingdom: Plantae
- Clade: Tracheophytes
- Clade: Angiosperms
- Clade: Monocots
- Clade: Commelinids
- Order: Poales
- Family: Poaceae
- Subfamily: Chloridoideae
- Tribe: Eragrostideae
- Subtribe: Cotteinae
- Genus: Kaokochloa; De Winter
- Species: K. nigrirostris

Binomial name
- Kaokochloa nigrirostris De Winter

= Kaokochloa =

Genus of grasses

Kaokochloa is a genus of African plants in the grass family.

Species

The only known species is Kaokochloa nigrirostris, native to Namibia.
