= Psammagrostis =

Scientific classification
- Kingdom: Plantae
- Clade: Tracheophytes
- Clade: Angiosperms
- Clade: Monocots
- Clade: Commelinids
- Order: Poales
- Family: Poaceae
- Subfamily: Chloridoideae
- Tribe: Eragrostideae
- Subtribe: Eragrostidinae
- Genus: Psammagrostis; C.A.Gardner & C.E.Hubb.
- Species: P. wiseana

Binomial name
- Psammagrostis wiseana C.A.Gardner & C.E.Hubb.

Genus of grasses

Psammagrostis is a genus of plants in the grass family. The only known species is Psammagrostis wiseana, native to Western Australia.
