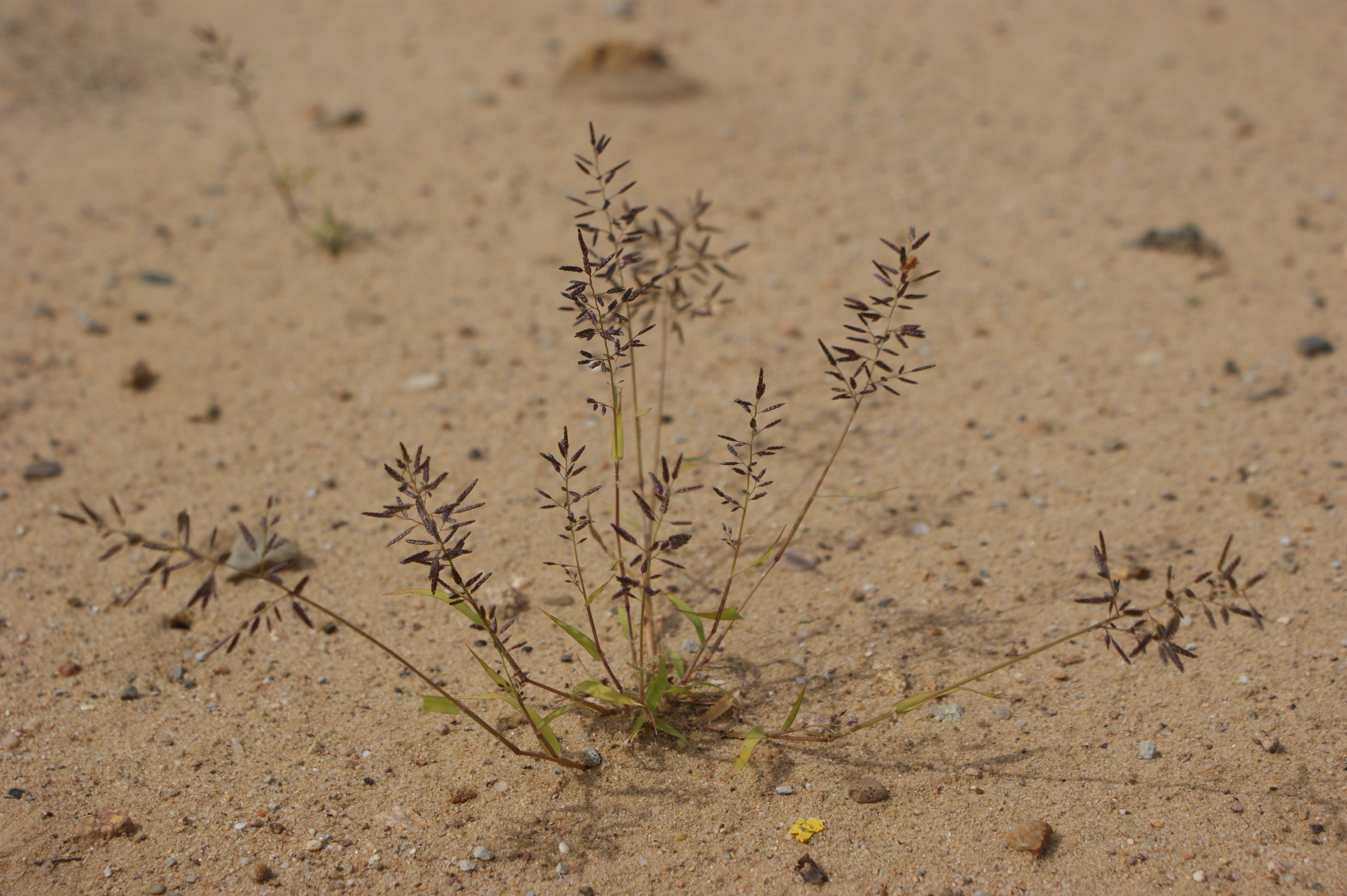
- Habit
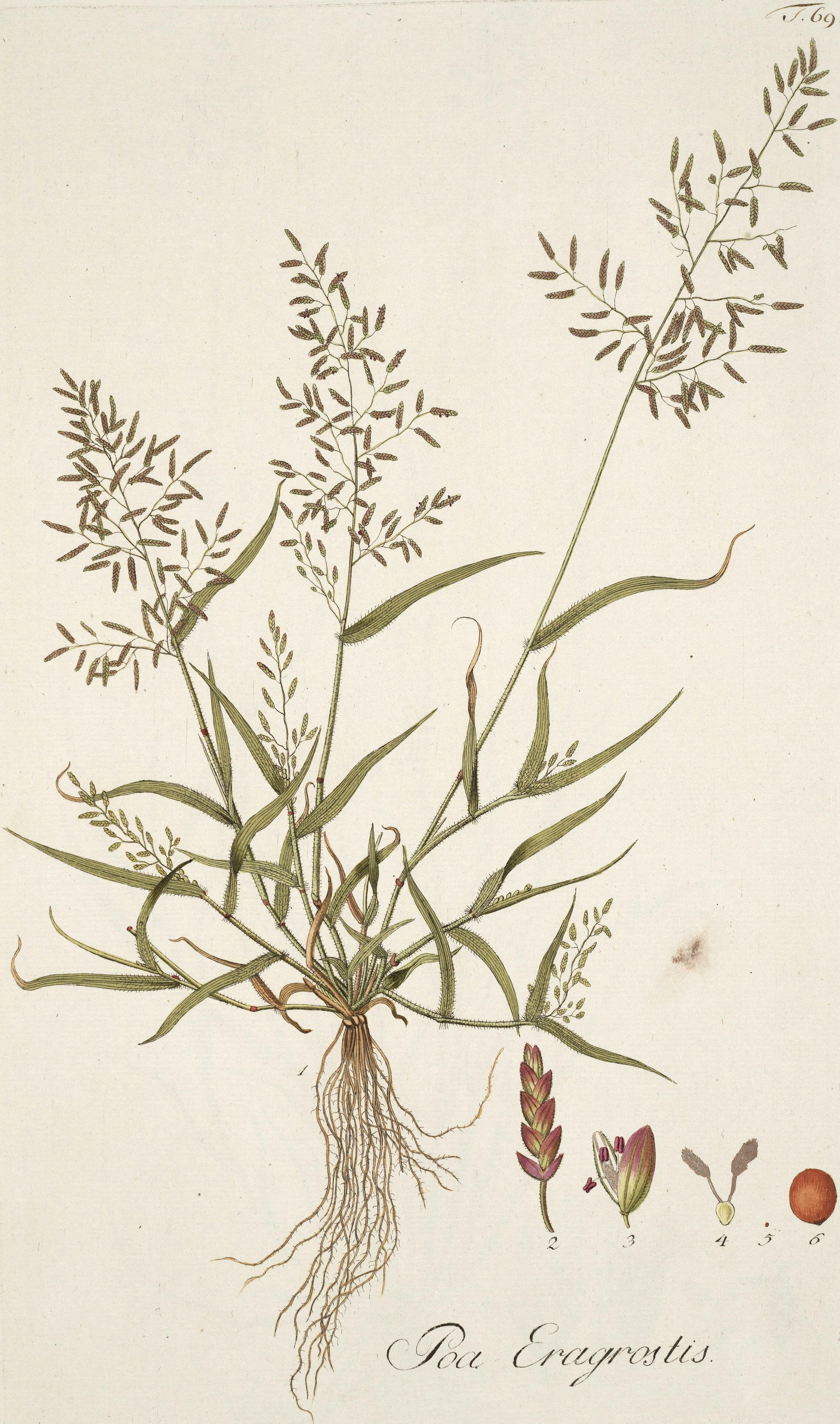

Scientific classification
- Kingdom: Plantae
- Clade: Tracheophytes
- Clade: Angiosperms
- Clade: Monocots
- Clade: Commelinids
- Order: Poales
- Family: Poaceae
- Subfamily: Chloridoideae
- Genus: Eragrostis
- Species: E. minor

Binomial name
- Eragrostis minor Host

Synonyms
- List: Eragrostis beguinotii Belosersky; Eragrostis borysthenica (Schmalh.) Klokov; Eragrostis brizoides Costa; Eragrostis cilianensis f. minor (Host) Maire & Weiller; Eragrostis cilianensis f. nana Maire & Weiller; Eragrostis cilianensis subsp. pooides (Husn.) Maire; Eragrostis eragrostis var. microstachya Coss. & Germ.; Eragrostis eragrostis var. microstachya Farw.; Eragrostis megastachya var. nana Trab.; Eragrostis megastachya subsp. pooides Husn.; Eragrostis minor subsp. angusta H.Scholz & Raus; Eragrostis minor f. arenosa A.F.Schwarz; Eragrostis minor subsp. mimica H.Scholz; Eragrostis minor var. minima B.S.Sun & S.Wang; Eragrostis minor var. rajasthanensis Vivek, G.V.S.Murthy & V.J.Nair; Eragrostis minor var. roborovskii Tzvelev; Eragrostis minor subsp. roborovskii (Tzvelev) H.Scholz; Eragrostis minor var. suaveolens (A.K.Becker ex Claus) Schmalh.; Eragrostis minor f. umbrosa A.F.Schwarz; Eragrostis multiflora var. pappiana Chiov.; Eragrostis multiflora var. pooides (Husn.) Trab.; Eragrostis pappiana (Chiov.) Chiov.; Eragrostis pilosa var. minor (Host) Kuntze; Eragrostis poaeoides P.Beauv. ex Roem. & Schult.; Eragrostis poiformis Link; Eragrostis pooides P.Beauv.; Eragrostis pooides f. arenosa (A.F.Schwarz) Soó; Eragrostis pooides subsp. brizoides K.Richt.; Eragrostis pooides var. laxiflora Döll; Eragrostis pooides var. spiciformis Trautv. ex Regel; Eragrostis pooides var. suaveolens (A.K.Becker ex Claus) Schmalh.; Eragrostis pooides f. umbrosa (A.F.Schwarz) Soó; Eragrostis suaveolens A.K.Becker ex Claus; Eragrostis suaveolens subsp. borysthenica (Schmalh.) Tzvelev; Eragrostis suaveolens var. borysthenica Schmalh.; Eragrostis vulgaris Coss. & Germ.; Eragrostis vulgaris var. microstachya Coss. & Germ.; Eragrostis vulgaris var. minor (Host) Rouy; Eragrostis vulgaris subsp. minor (Host) Rouy; Eragrostis vulgaris subsp. pooides (Husn.) Douin; Eragrostis willdenoviana Nees ex Hook. & Arn.; Poa canariensis Willd. ex Spreng.; Poa eragrostis L.

= Eragrostis minor =

Ornamental grass

Eragrostis minor, the little lovegrass or smaller stinkgrass, is a widespread species of flowering plant in the family Poaceae, native to most of the subtropical and warm temperate Old World, and introduced to North America, South America, and Australia. Preferring disturbed open places with little competition, and sandy or gravelly soils, it is often found growing on rail embankments, road verges, cracks in sidewalks, and waste areas. Its seeds are edible, but quite small and difficult to harvest and handle, so it is usually regarded as a famine food.

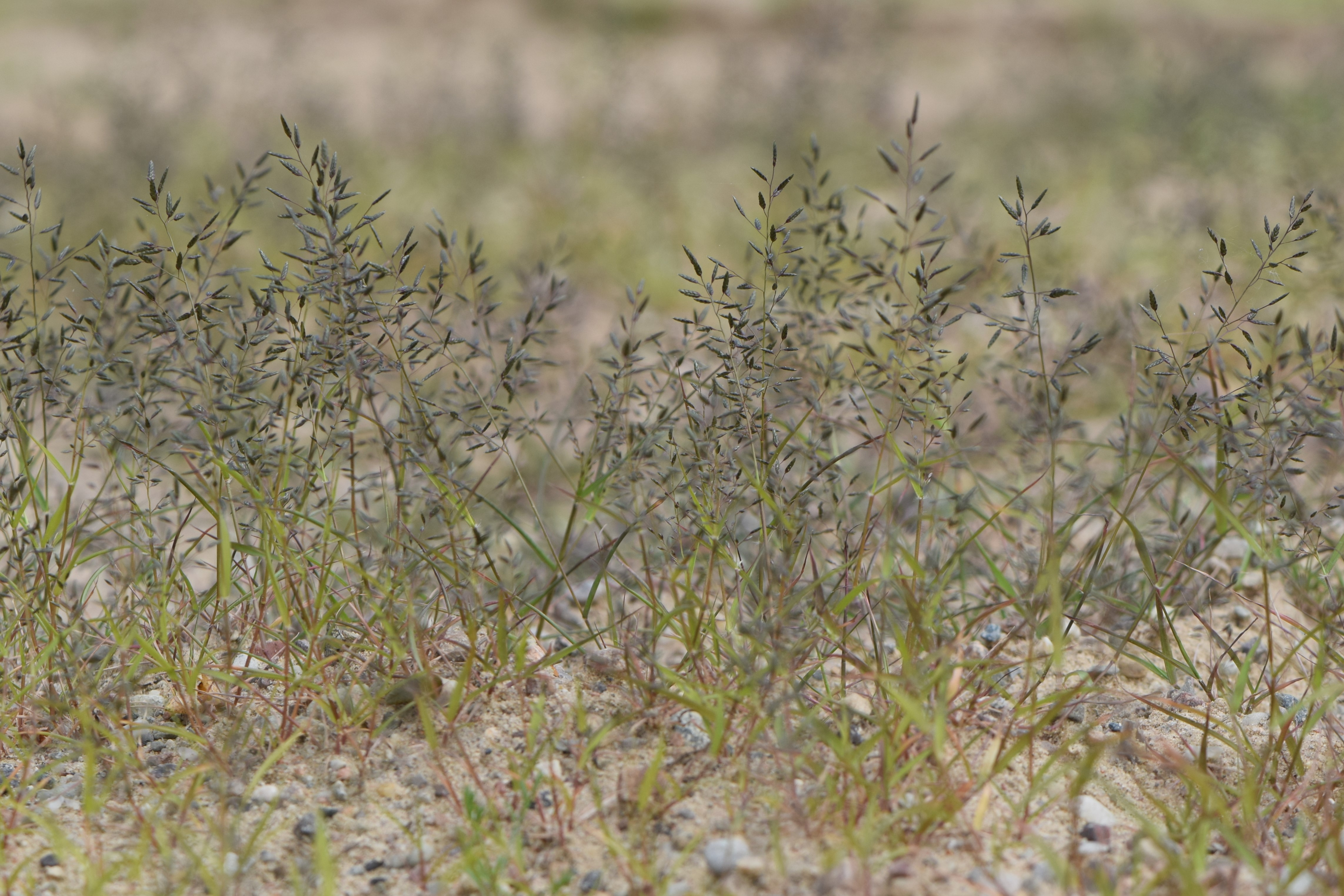
Mass effect

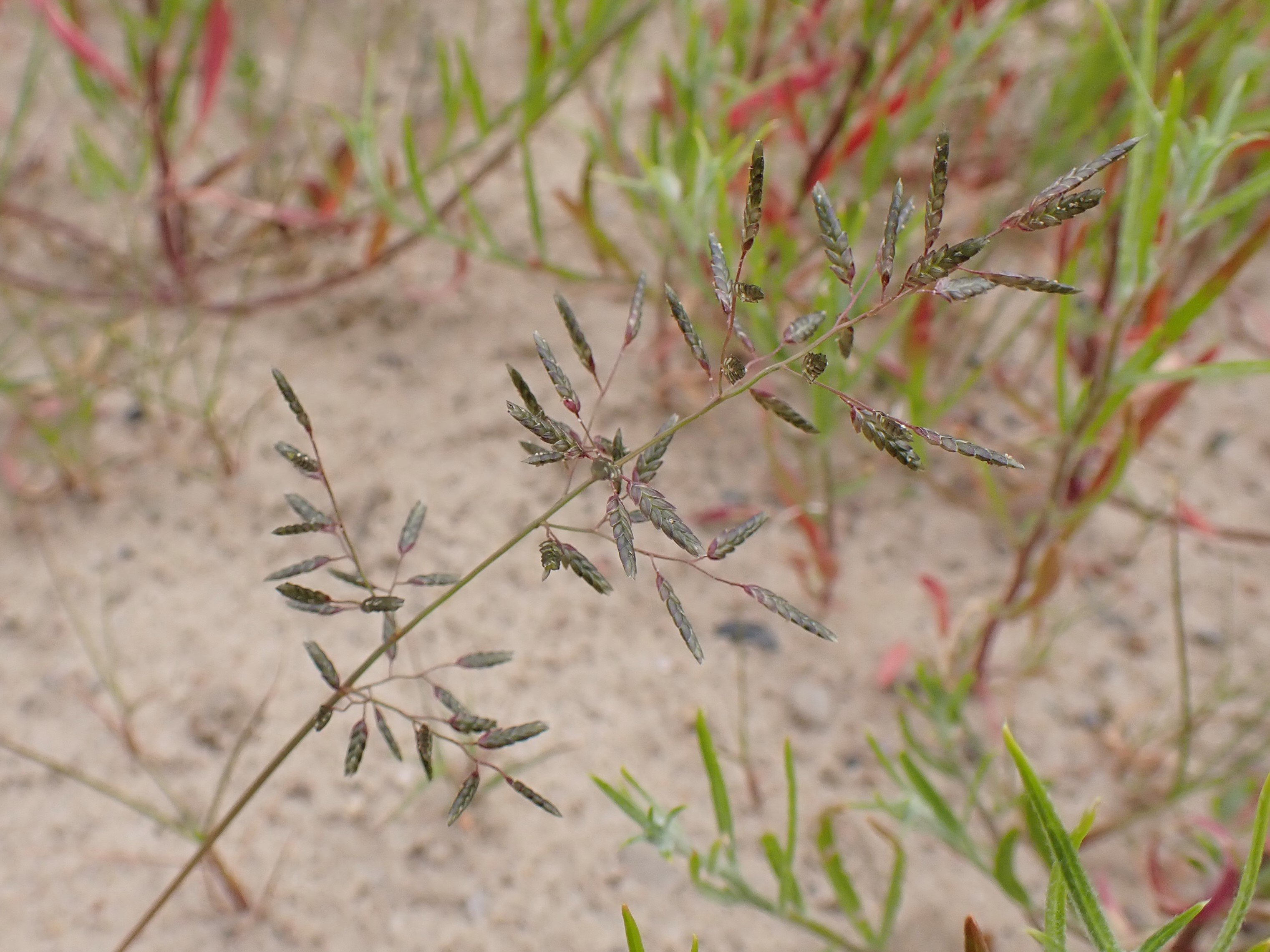
Flowers

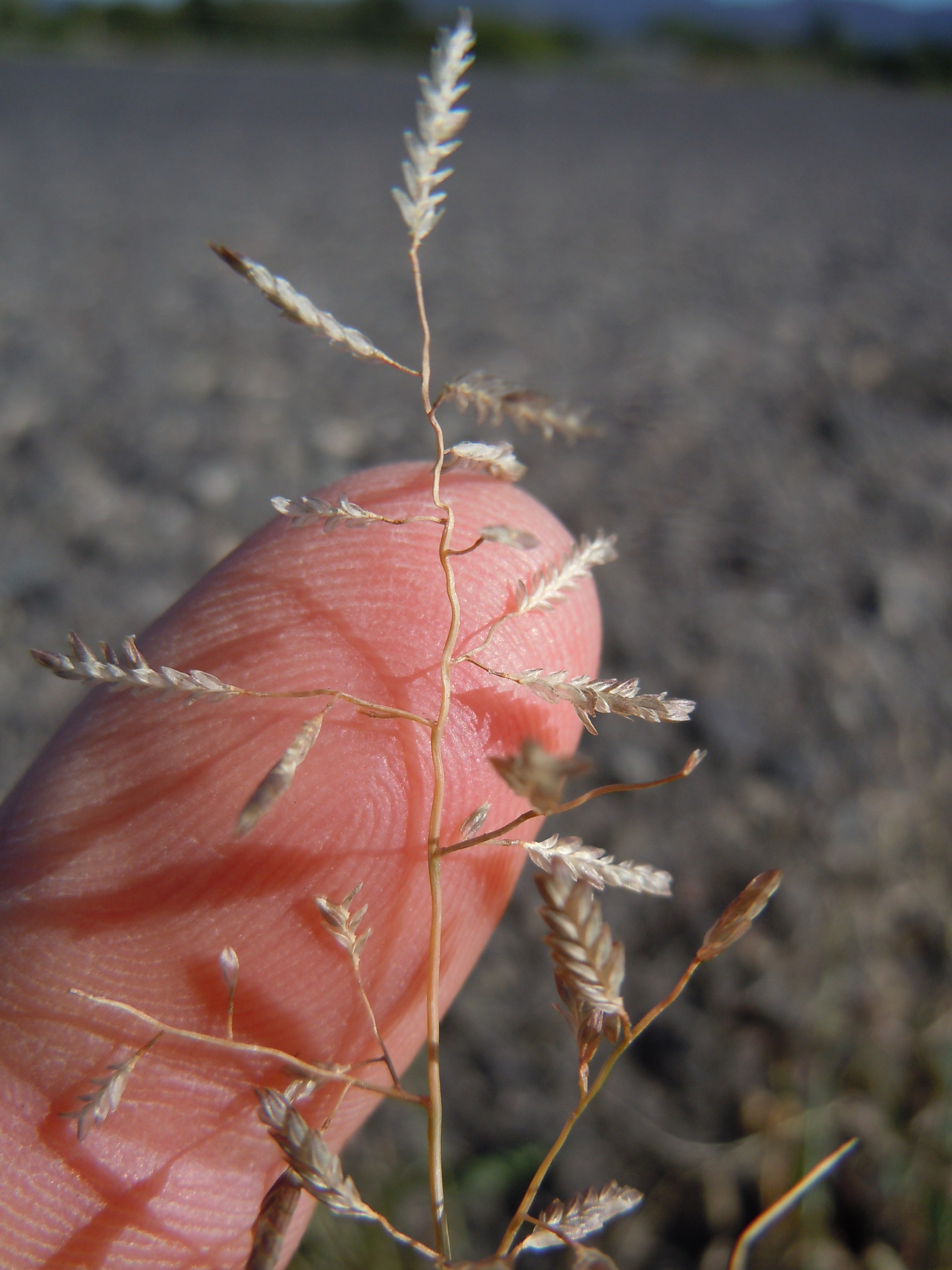
Seedheads with human finger for scale

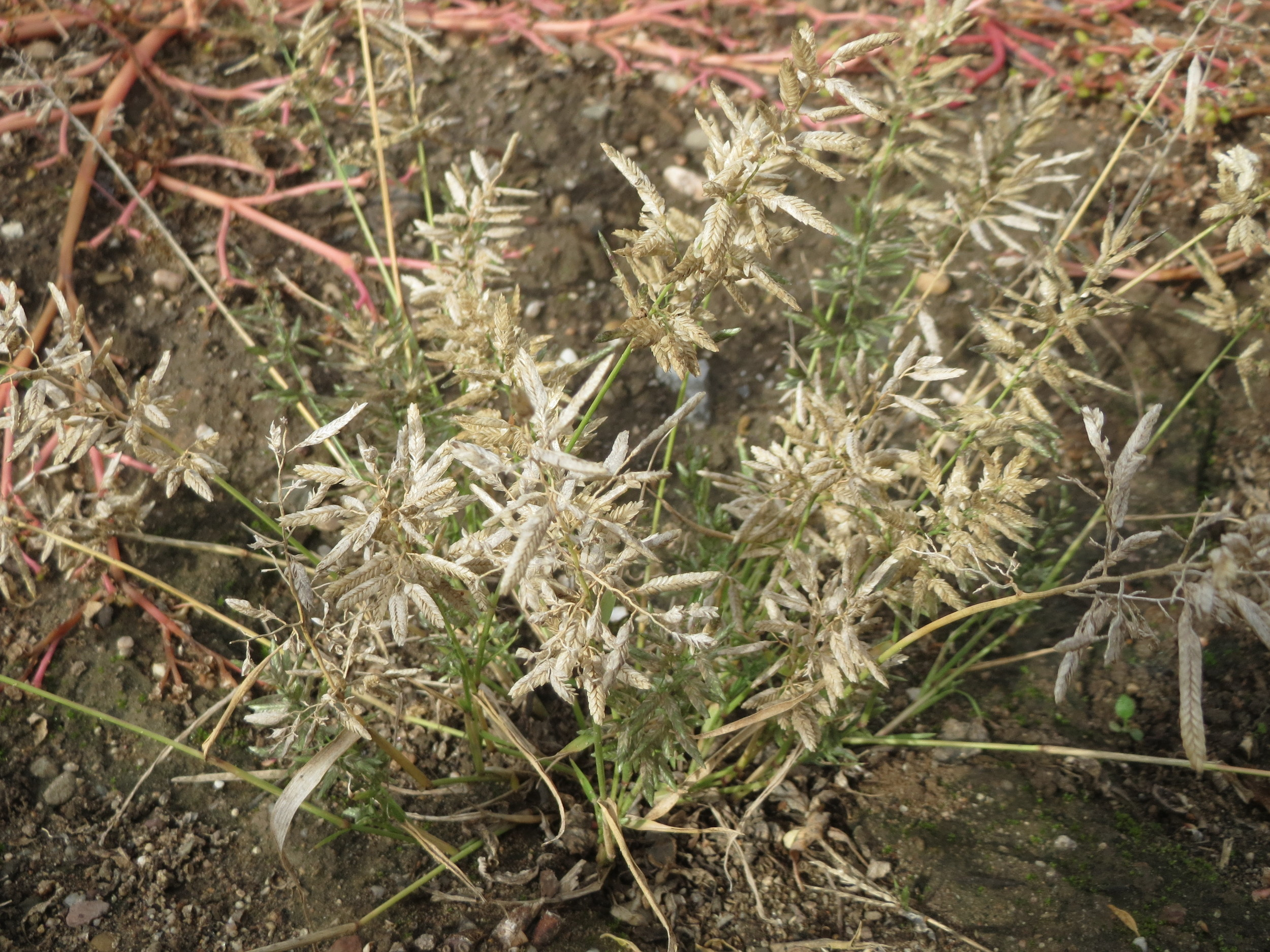
Ripe seedheads

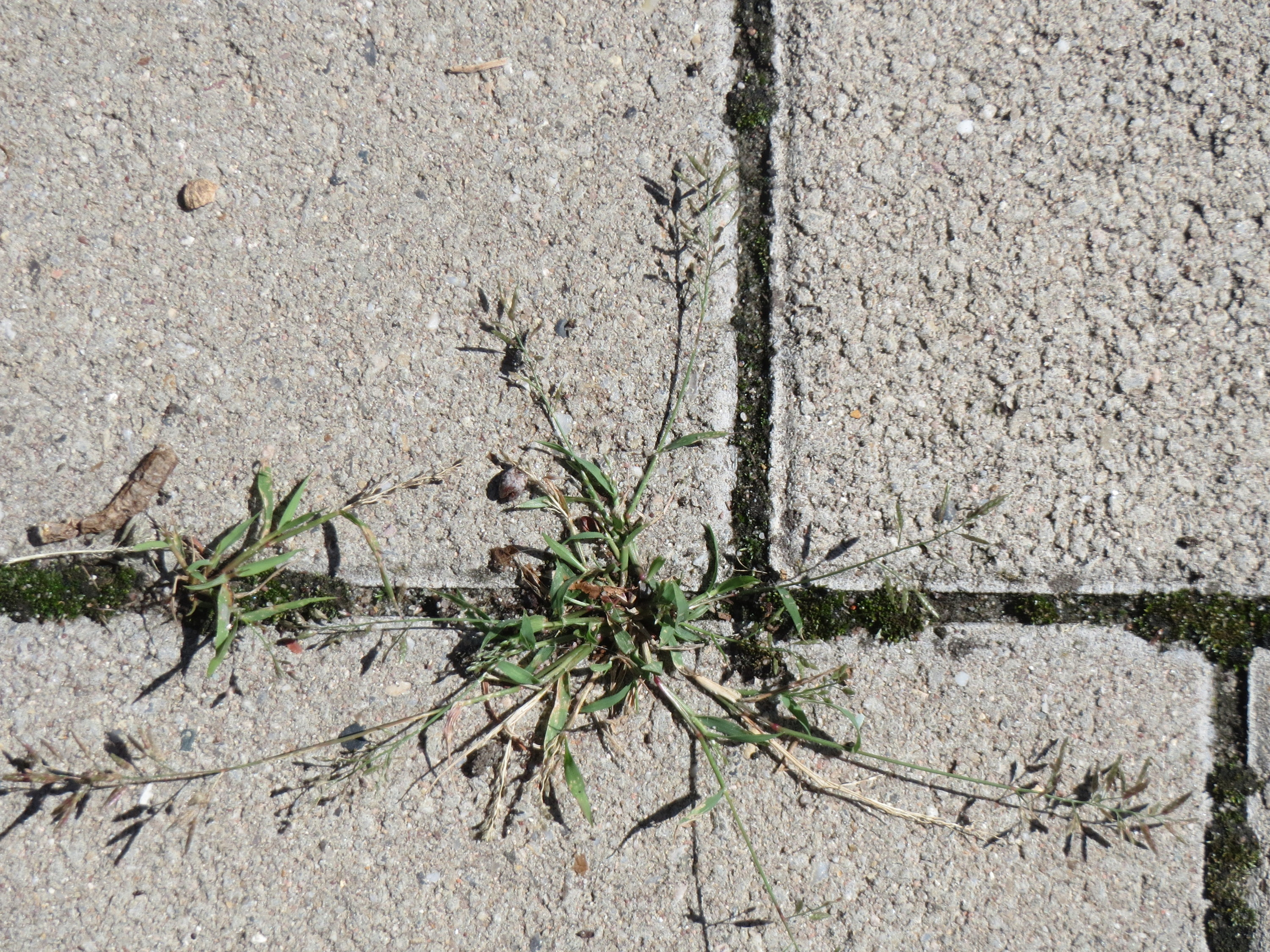
Eragrostis minor is often found growing in pavement cracks

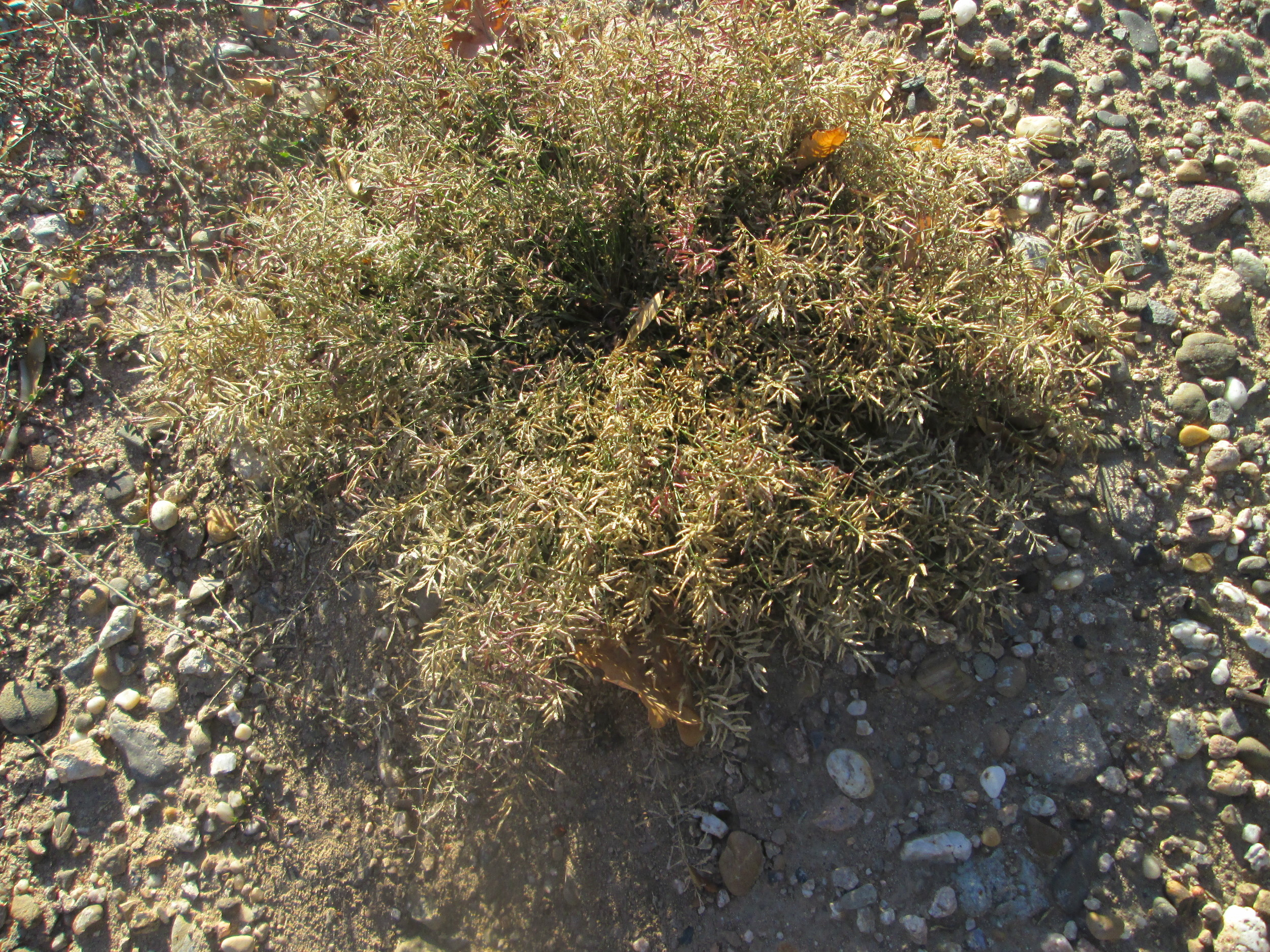
A particularly large individual

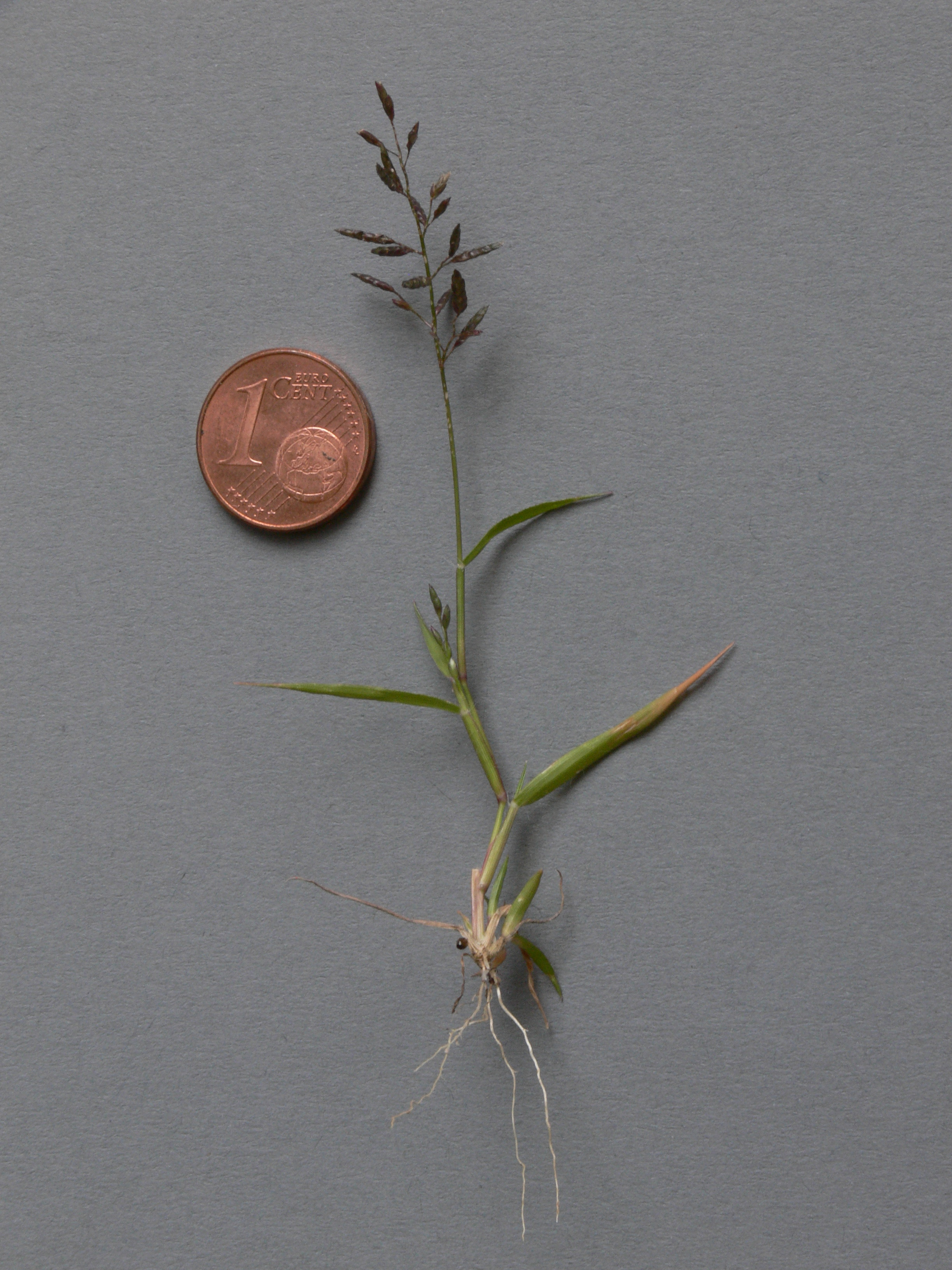
Uprooted specimen with coin for scale

== Pests & Diseases ==
E. minor is the only known host as of 2023 of the Eragrostis minor streak virus.

E. minor is host to Calamomyia agrostis, a gall-forming fly of the family Cecidomyiidae, and Phenacoccus solenopsis, a species of mealybug.
