= Richardsiella =

Scientific classification
- Kingdom: Plantae
- Clade: Tracheophytes
- Clade: Angiosperms
- Clade: Monocots
- Clade: Commelinids
- Order: Poales
- Family: Poaceae
- Subfamily: Chloridoideae
- Tribe: Eragrostideae
- Subtribe: Eragrostidinae
- Genus: Richardsiella; Elffers & Kenn.-O'Byrne
- Species: R. eruciformis

Binomial name
- Richardsiella eruciformis Elffers & Kenn.-O'Byrne

Genus of grasses

Richardsiella is a genus of plants in the grass family. The only known species in this genus is Richardsiella eruciformis, native to the Democratic Republic of the Congo and Zambia.
