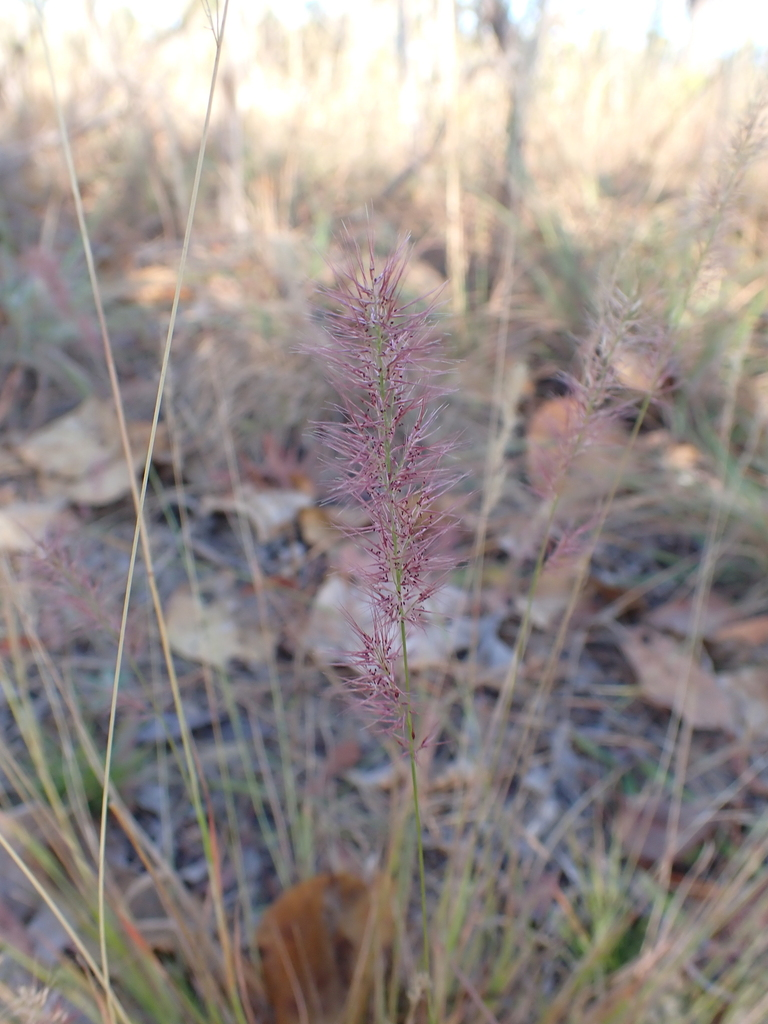

Scientific classification
- Kingdom: Plantae
- Clade: Tracheophytes
- Clade: Angiosperms
- Clade: Monocots
- Clade: Commelinids
- Order: Poales
- Family: Poaceae
- Subfamily: Chloridoideae
- Tribe: Eragrostideae
- Subtribe: Eragrostidinae
- Genus: Ectrosia; R.Br.

Type species
- Ectrosia leporina R.Br.

Synonyms
- Eragrostis sect. Ectrosiopsis Ohwi; Ectrosiopsis (Ohwi) Jansen; Planichloa B.K.Simon

= Ectrosia =

Genus of grasses

Ectrosia is a genus of Asian, Australian, and Pacific Island plants in the grass family.

Species

- Ectrosia agrostoides Benth. - Maluku, Aru Islands, Western Australia, Northern Territory, Queensland
- Ectrosia anomala C.E.Hubb. - Queensland
- Ectrosia appressa S.T.Blake - Queensland
- Ectrosia blakei C.E.Hubb. - Queensland, Northern Territory
- Ectrosia confusa C.E.Hubb. - Queensland, Northern Territory
- Ectrosia danesii Domin - Western Australia, Northern Territory, Queensland
- Ectrosia gulliveri F.Muell. - Queensland
- Ectrosia lasioclada (Merr.) S.T.Blake - Western Australia, Northern Territory, Queensland, New Guinea, Caroline Islands, Maluku, Philippines, Sulawesi, Lesser Sunda Islands
- Ectrosia laxa S.T.Blake - Western Australia, Northern Territory, Queensland
- Ectrosia leporina R.Br. - Western Australia, Northern Territory, Queensland, New Guinea, Sulawesi
- Ectrosia nervilemma (B.K.Simon) Night. - Queensland
- Ectrosia ovata Night. - Queensland
- Ectrosia scabrida C.E.Hubb. - Western Australia, Northern Territory, Queensland
- Ectrosia schultzii Benth. - Western Australia, Northern Territory, Queensland
