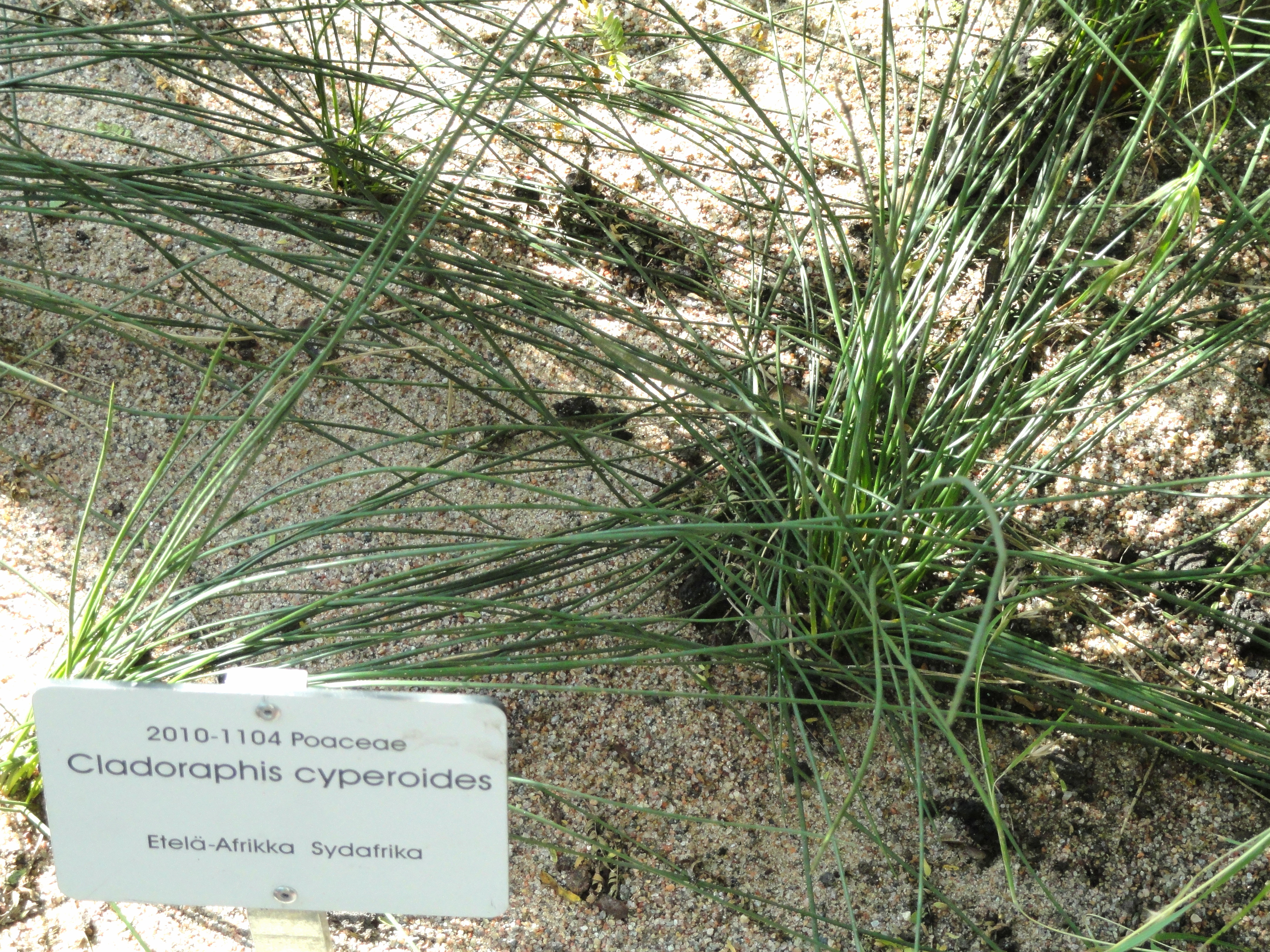
- Cladoraphis cyperoides Botanical Garden in Kaisaniemi; Helsinki, Finland

Scientific classification
- Kingdom: Plantae
- Clade: Tracheophytes
- Clade: Angiosperms
- Clade: Monocots
- Clade: Commelinids
- Order: Poales
- Family: Poaceae
- Subfamily: Chloridoideae
- Tribe: Eragrostideae
- Subtribe: Eragrostidinae
- Genus: Cladoraphis; Franch.

Synonyms
- Eragrostis sect. Cladoraphis (Franch.) Pilg.

= Cladoraphis =

Bristly lovegrass

Genus of grasses

Cladoraphis (common name bristly lovegrass) is a genus of African plants in the grass family, native to southern Africa. Its phylogenetic position within the subfamily has not yet been resolved.

Species

- Cladoraphis cyperoides (Thunb.) S.M.Phillips - Angola, Cape Province, Namibia; naturalized in the Columbia River Gorge in the US State of Oregon
- Cladoraphis spinosa (L.f.) S.M.Phillips - Western Cape and Northern Cape provinces of South Africa, Namibia; common name spiny love grass, volstruisgras or volstruisdoring (Afrikaans for ostrich grass).

Both species occur along the coast of south western Africa. C. cyperoides occurs on coastal dunes from Angola all the way to the Cape peninsula. C. spinosa occurs on sandy flats from Namibia to Cape Agulhas and the Little Karoo.

Cladoraphis spinosa is a spiny, bushy perennial up to 60 cm in height. Its leaves are lanceolate, rolled, rigid and pungent. Spikelets occur in rigid panicles, and primary branches are persistent, spiny, less than their own length apart, 6–18 mm long, and perpendicular to branchlets. It flowers in the austral summer months (August–May).
