= Pentameris =

Scientific classification
- Kingdom: Plantae
- Clade: Tracheophytes
- Clade: Angiosperms
- Clade: Monocots
- Clade: Commelinids
- Order: Poales
- Family: Poaceae
- Subfamily: Danthonioideae
- Tribe: Danthonieae
- Genus: Pentameris; P.Beauv.

Type species
- Pentameris thuarii P.Beauv.

Synonyms
- Danthonia sect. Pentameris (P. Beauv.) Trin.; Danthonia subg. Pentameris (P. Beauv.) Nees; Prionanthium Desv.; Prionachne Nees; Chondrolaena Nees; Achneria Munro 1868, illegitimate homonym not P. Beauv. 1812; Pentaschistis Stapf; Poagrostis Stapf; Afrachneria Sprague

Genus of plants

Pentameris is a genus of plants in the grass family, native primarily to Africa, with a few species in Yemen and on certain islands in the Indian Ocean.

A significant number of species are endemic to South Africa.

== Species ==
As of April 2023, Plants of the World Online accepted the following species:

- Pentameris acinosa (Stapf) Galley & H.P.Linder – South Africa
- Pentameris airoides (Nees) Steud. – South Africa, Lesotho, Namibia
- Pentameris alticola (H.P.Linder) Galley & H.P.Linder – South Africa
- Pentameris ampla (Nees) Galley & H.P.Linder – South Africa
- Pentameris andringitrensis (A.Camus) Galley & H.P.Linder – Madagascar
- Pentameris argentea (Stapf) Galley & H.P.Linder – South Africa
- Pentameris aristidoides (Thunb.) Galley & H.P.Linder – South Africa
- Pentameris aristifolia (Schweick.) Galley & H.P.Linder – South Africa
- Pentameris aspera (Thunb.) Galley & H.P.Linder – South Africa
- Pentameris aurea (Steud.) Galley & H.P.Linder – South Africa, Lesotho
- Pentameris barbata (Nees) Steud. – South Africa
- Pentameris basutorum (Stapf) Galley & H.P.Linder – South Africa, Lesotho
- Pentameris borussica (K.Schum.) Galley & H.P.Linder – Ethiopia, Kenya, Uganda, Tanzania
- Pentameris calcicola (H.P.Linder) Galley & H.P.Linder – South Africa
- Pentameris capensis (Nees) Galley & H.P.Linder – South Africa
- Pentameris capillaris (Thunb.) Galley & H.P.Linder – South Africa
- Pentameris caulescens (H.P.Linder) Galley & H.P.Linder – South Africa
- Pentameris chippindalliae (H.P.Linder) Galley & H.P.Linder – Tanzania
- Pentameris chrysurus (K.Schum.) Galley & H.P.Linder – Tanzania
- Pentameris cirrhulosa (Nees) Steud. – South Africa
- Pentameris clavata (Galley) Galley & H.P.Linder – South Africa
- Pentameris colorata (Steud.) Galley & H.P.Linder – South Africa
- Pentameris curvifolia (Schrad.) Nees – South Africa
- Pentameris densifolia (Nees) Steud. – South Africa
- Pentameris dentata (L.f.) Galley & H.P.Linder – South Africa
- Pentameris dolichochaeta (S.M.Phillips) Galley & H.P.Linder – Ethiopia
- Pentameris dregeana Stapf – South Africa
- Pentameris ecklonii (Nees) Galley & H.P.Linder – South Africa
- Pentameris elegans (Nees) Steud. – South Africa
- Pentameris ellisii H.P.Linder – South Africa
- Pentameris eriostoma (Nees) Steud. – South Africa
- Pentameris exserta (H.P.Linder) Galley & H.P.Linder – South Africa, Lesotho
- Pentameris galpinii (Stapf) Galley & H.P.Linder – South Africa, Lesotho
- Pentameris glacialis N.P.Barker – South Africa
- Pentameris glandulosa (Schrad.) Nees – South Africa
- Pentameris heptamera (Nees) Steud. – South Africa
- Pentameris hirtiglumis N.P.Barker – South Africa
- Pentameris holciformis (Nees) Galley & H.P.Linder – South Africa
- Pentameris horrida (Galley) Galley & H.P.Linder – South Africa
- Pentameris humbertii (A.Camus) Galley & H.P.Linder – Madagascar
- Pentameris insularis (Hemsl.) Galley & H.P.Linder – Amsterdam I + St. Paul I (both in Indian Ocean)
- Pentameris lima (Nees) Steud. – South Africa
- Pentameris longiglumis (Nees) Steud. – South Africa
- Pentameris longipes (Stapf) Galley & H.P.Linder – South Africa
- Pentameris macrocalycina (Steud.) Schweick. – South Africa
- Pentameris malouinensis (Steud.) Galley & H.P.Linder – South Africa
- Pentameris microphylla (Nees) Galley & H.P.Linder – South Africa
- Pentameris minor (F.Ballard & C.E.Hubb.) Galley & H.P.Linder – Ethiopia, Kenya, Uganda, Tanzania
- Pentameris montana (H.P.Linder) Galley & H.P.Linder – South Africa
- Pentameris natalensis (Stapf) Galley & H.P.Linder – South Africa, Madagascar, Tanzania, Malawi, Zimbabwe, Eswatini
- Pentameris oreodoxa (Schweick.) Galley & H.P.Linder – South Africa, Lesotho
- Pentameris oreophila N.P.Barker – South Africa
- Pentameris pallescens (Schrad.) Nees – South Africa
- Pentameris pallida (Thunb.) Galley & H.P.Linder – South Africa
- Pentameris patula (Nees) Steud. – South Africa
- Pentameris pholiuroides (Stapf) Galley & H.P.Linder – South Africa
- Pentameris pictigluma (Steud.) Galley & H.P.Linder – Yemen, Sudan, Rwanda, Cameroon, Ethiopia, Kenya, Uganda, Tanzania
- Pentameris praecox (H.P.Linder) Galley & H.P.Linder – Lesotho
- Pentameris pseudopallescens (H.P.Linder) Galley & H.P.Linder – South Africa
- Pentameris pungens (H.P.Linder) Galley & H.P.Linder – South Africa
- Pentameris pusilla (Nees) Galley & H.P.Linder – South Africa
- Pentameris pyrophila (H.P.Linder) Galley & H.P.Linder – South Africa
- Pentameris reflexa (H.P.Linder) Galley & H.P.Linder – South Africa
- Pentameris rigidissima (Pilg. ex H.P.Linder) Galley & H.P.Linder – South Africa
- Pentameris rosea (H.P.Linder) Galley & H.P.Linder – South Africa
- Pentameris rupestris (Nees) Steud. – South Africa
- Pentameris scabra (Nees) Steud. – South Africa
- Pentameris scandens (H.P.Linder) Galley & H.P.Linder – South Africa
- Pentameris setifolia (Thunb.) Galley & H.P.Linder – South Africa, Lesotho
- Pentameris swartbergensis N.P.Barker – South Africa
- Pentameris thuarii P.Beauv. – South Africa
- Pentameris tomentella (Stapf) Galley & H.P.Linder – South Africa
- Pentameris tortuosa (Trin.) Nees – South Africa
- Pentameris trifida (Galley) Galley & H.P.Linder – South Africa
- Pentameris triseta (Thunb.) Galley & H.P.Linder – South Africa
- Pentameris trisetoides (Hochst. ex Steud.) Galley & H.P.Linder – Ethiopia
- Pentameris tysonii (Stapf) Galley & H.P.Linder – South Africa
- Pentameris uniflora N.P.Barker – South Africa
- Pentameris velutina (H.P.Linder) Galley & H.P.Linder – South Africa
- Pentameris veneta (H.P.Linder) Galley & H.P.Linder – South Africa
- Pentameris viscidula (Nees) Steud. – South Africa

=== Formerly included ===
See Chaetobromus, Danthonia, Merxmuellera, Pseudopentameris, Tenaxia. Some formerly included species are:

- Pentameris americana - Danthonia californica
- Pentameris californica - Danthonia californica
- Pentameris compressa - Danthonia compressa
- Pentameris epilis - Danthonia sericea
- Pentameris grandiflora - Merxmuellera grandiflora
- Pentameris intermedia - Danthonia intermedia
- Pentameris involucrata - Chaetobromus involucratus
- Pentameris macrantha - Pseudopentameris macrantha
- Pentameris obtusifolia - Pseudopentameris obtusifolia
- Pentameris provincialis - Danthonia alpina
- Pentameris sericea - Danthonia sericea
- Pentameris spicata - Danthonia spicata
- Pentameris squarrosa - Pseudopentameris obtusifolia
- Pentameris stricta - Tenaxia stricta
- Pentameris thermalis - Danthonia spicata
- Pentameris unispicata - Danthonia unispicata
