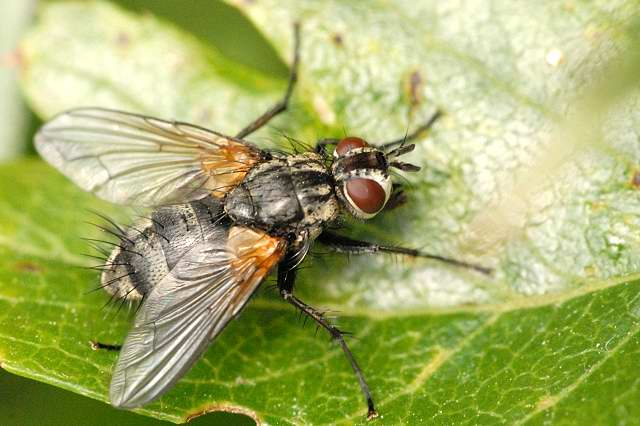
- Dinera ferina

Scientific classification
- Kingdom: Animalia
- Phylum: Arthropoda
- Class: Insecta
- Order: Diptera
- Family: Tachinidae
- Subfamily: Dexiinae
- Tribe: Dexiini
- Genus: Dinera
- Species: D. ferina

Binomial name
- Dinera ferina (Fallén, 1817)

Synonyms
- Billaea sibirica Kolomiets, 1966; Musca ferina Fallén, 1817; Myocera apicalis Robineau-Desvoidy, 1863; Myocera longipes Robineau-Desvoidy, 1830; Omalogaster subrotundata Macquart, 1835; Phorostoma offae Kolomiets, 1966; Phorostoma subrotunda Robineau-Desvoidy, 1830

= Dinera ferina =

Species of fly

Dinera ferina (Fallen) is a species of fly in the family Tachinidae. In June 2018, the Bulletin of Insectology wrote that Dinera ferina was "confirmed to be a parasitoid of larvae of the two Italian Platycerus species, Platycerus caprea (De Geer) and Platycerus caraboides (L.) (Coleoptera Lucanidae)."

== Distribution ==
Czech Republic, Estonia, Hungary, Latvia, Lithuania, Moldova, Poland, Romania, Slovakia, Ukraine, Denmark, Finland, Norway, Sweden, Albania, Bosnia and Herzegovina, Bulgaria, Croatia, Greece, Italy, Portugal, Serbia, Slovenia, Spain, Turkey, Austria, Belgium, France, Germany, Netherlands, Switzerland, Kazakhstan, Russia, Transcaucasia, China.
