= D. intermedia =

D. intermedia may refer to:

- Dactylopteryx intermedia, a praying mantis species
- Danthonia intermedia, the timber oatgrass or intermediate oatgrass, a grass species native to North America
- Dicranomyia intermedia, a crane fly species in the genus Dicranomyia
- Drosera intermedia, the oblong-leaved sundew or spoonleaf sundew, an insectivorous plant species found in Europe, southeastern Canada, the eastern half of the United States, Cuba and northern South America
- Dryopteris intermedia, the intermediate wood fern, an evergreen fern species found in eastern North American
- Dypsis intermedia, a flowering plant species found only in Madagascar

== See also ==
- Intermedia (disambiguation)
