= D. orientalis =

D. orientalis may refer to:

- Dactyloptena orientalis, the Oriental flying gurnard, a fish species found in the Indo-Pacific Oceans
- Dactylopteryx orientalis, a praying mantis species
- Dalbergia orientalis, a legume species found only in Madagascar
- Dinera orientalis, a tachinid fly species in the genus Dinera
- Dinocephalosaurus orientalis, a long necked, aquatic protorosaur species that inhabited the Triassic seas of China

== Synonyms ==
- Dactylorchis orientalis, a synonym for Dactylorhiza foliosa, the richly-leaved dactylorhiza, an orchid species

== See also ==
- Orientalis (disambiguation)
