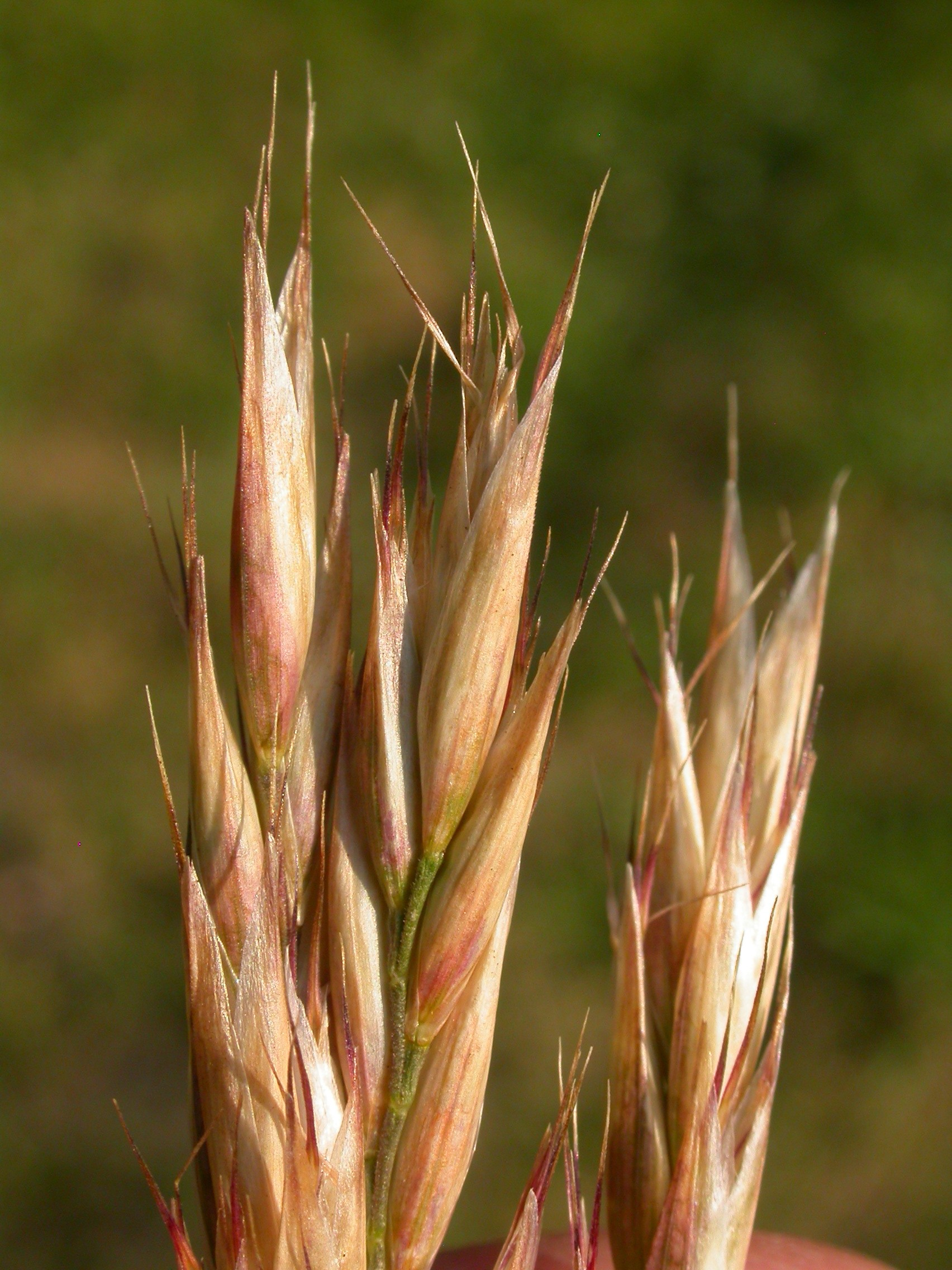
- Danthonia intermedia

Scientific classification
- Kingdom: Plantae
- Clade: Tracheophytes
- Clade: Angiosperms
- Clade: Monocots
- Clade: Commelinids
- Order: Poales
- Family: Poaceae
- Subfamily: Danthonioideae
- Tribe: Danthonieae
- Genus: Danthonia; DC.

Type species
- Danthonia spicata (L.) P. Beauv. ex Roem. & Schult.

Synonyms
- Sieglingia Bernh.; Merathrepta Raf.; Brachatera Desv.; Triodon Baumg.; Danthosieglingia Domin

= Danthonia =

Genus of grasses

Danthonia is a genus of Eurasian, North African, and American plants in the grass family. Members of this genus are sometimes referred to as oatgrass, but that common name is not restricted to this genus. Other common names include heathgrass and wallaby grass. Australian species have since been reclassified into the genus Rytidosperma.

Species

- Danthonia alpina Vest – central + southern Europe; Ukraine, Turkey, Caucasus
- Danthonia annableae P.M.Peterson & Rúgolo – Bolivia, Argentina
- Danthonia araucana Phil. – Chile
- Danthonia boliviensis Renvoize – Bolivia
- Danthonia × breviaristata (Beck) Vierh – France, Italy, Austria, Czech Rep, Romania
- Danthonia breviseta Hack. – Rio de Janeiro
- Danthonia californica Bol. – BC ALB SAS WA OR CA NV ID UT MT WY SD CO AZ NM; Chile
- Danthonia cernua Döll – Brazil
- Danthonia chaseana Conert – Minas Gerais
- Danthonia chiapasensis Davidse – Chiapas
- Danthonia chilensis É.Desv. – Argentina, Chile incl Juan Fernández Is
- Danthonia cirrata Hack. & Arechav. – Bolivia, Brazil, Argentina, Uruguay
- Danthonia compressa Austin – mountain oatgrass, flattened oatgrass, slender oatgrass – eastern North America from Georgia to Nova Scotia + Ontario
- Danthonia decumbens (L.) DC. – common heath grass – Europe, North Africa, Turkey, Caucasus
- Danthonia domingensis Hack. & Pilg. – Hispaniola, Jamaica
- Danthonia holm-nielsenii Laegaard – Ecuador
- Danthonia intermedia Vasey – timber oatgrass, intermediate oatgrass – western United States, Canada, Russian Far East
- Danthonia malacantha (Steud.) Pilg. – Chile incl Juan Fernández Is
- Danthonia melanathera (Hack.) Bernardello – Argentina
- Danthonia montevidensis Hack. & Arechav. – Brazil, Argentina, Uruguay
- Danthonia parryi Scribn. – ALB SAS CO MT WY NM
- Danthonia rhizomata Swallen – Brazil, Uruguay
- Danthonia rugoloana Sulekic – Salta
- Danthonia secundiflora J.Presl – from Mexico to Uruguay
- Danthonia sericea Nutt. – eastern + central United States
- Danthonia spicata (L.) Roem. & Schult. – poverty oatgrass, poverty grass – from Alaska + Greenland to Veracruz
- Danthonia unispicata (Thurb.) Munro ex Macoun – onespike oatgrass – ALB BC SAS WA ID MT OR WY SD UT NV CA

Formerly included

A number of species which were formerly classified under Danthonia are now included in Amphibromus, Astrebla, Chionochloa, Joycea, Karroochloa, Monachather, Merxmuellera, Notodanthonia, Plinthanthesis, Rytidosperma or Schismus.
