= Tribolium =

Tribolium is the scientific name of two genera of organisms and may refer to:

- Tribolium (beetle), a genus of beetles in the family Tenebrionidae
- Tribolium (plant), a genus of plants in the family Poaceae
