= Platycerus piceus =

Scientific classification
- Kingdom: Animalia
- Phylum: Arthropoda
- Class: Insecta
- Order: Coleoptera
- Suborder: Polyphaga
- Infraorder: Scarabaeiformia
- Family: Lucanidae
- Genus: Platycerus
- Species: P. piceus

Binomial name
- Platycerus piceus Kirby in Richardson, 1837

Species of beetle

Platycerus piceus is a species of stag beetle, from the Lucinidae family and Lucaninae subfamily. It was discovered by William Kirby in 1837.

== Geographical distribution ==
It can be found in North America.
