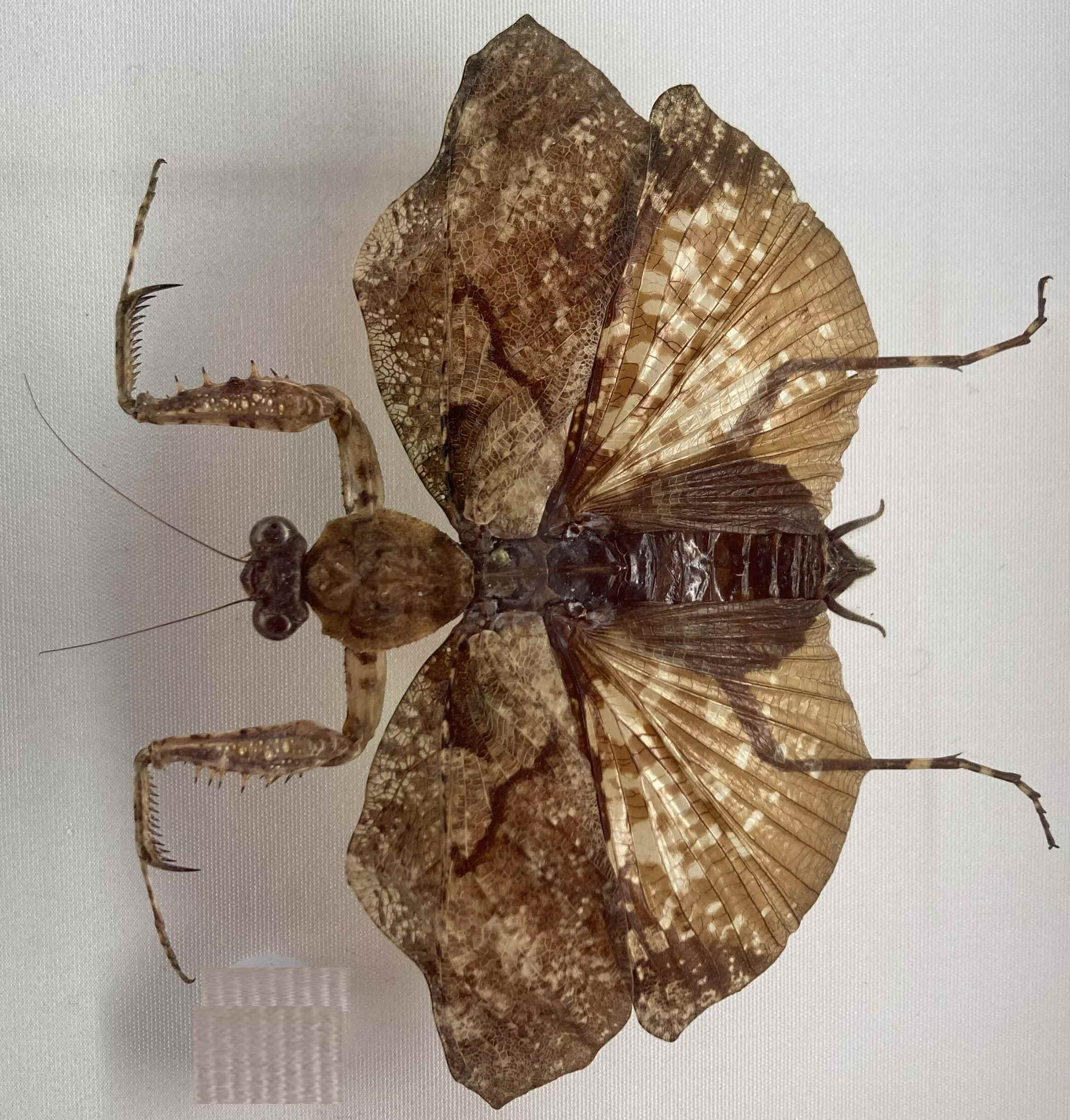
- Theopompella fusca as displayed at the Cleveland Museum of Natural History

Scientific classification
- Kingdom: Animalia
- Phylum: Arthropoda
- Clade: Pancrustacea
- Class: Insecta
- Order: Mantodea
- Family: Dactylopterygidae
- Genus: Theopompella
- Species: T. fusca

Binomial name
- Theopompella fusca Giglio-Tos, 1917

= Theopompella fusca =

Species of mantis

Theopompella fusca is a species of praying mantis in the family Dactylopterygidae. It was first described by Italian entomologist Ermanno Giglio-Tos in 1917.

== Taxonomy ==
- Theopompella fusca belongs to the order Mantodea, class Insecta, and phylum Arthropoda.
