= Pentameris insularis =

Scientific classification
- Kingdom: Plantae
- Clade: Tracheophytes
- Clade: Angiosperms
- Clade: Monocots
- Clade: Commelinids
- Order: Poales
- Family: Poaceae
- Genus: Pentameris
- Species: P. insularis

Binomial name
- Pentameris insularis (Hemsl.) Galley & H.P.Linder

Synonyms
- Pentaschistis insularis (Hemsl.) H.P.Linder; Trisetum insulare Hemsl.

Species of grass

Pentameris insularis is a species of flowering plant in the family Poaceae. It is native to the Amsterdam and Saint Paul islands. It was first described by William Hemsley in 1884 as Trisetum insulare and transferred to Pentameris in 2010.
