= Platycerus caucasicus =

Scientific classification
- Domain: Eukaryota
- Kingdom: Animalia
- Phylum: Arthropoda
- Class: Insecta
- Order: Coleoptera
- Suborder: Polyphaga
- Infraorder: Scarabaeiformia
- Family: Lucanidae
- Genus: Platycerus
- Species: P. caucasicus

Binomial name
- Platycerus caucasicus Parry, 1864

Species of beetle

Platycerus caucasicus is a species of stag beetle from the subfamily Lucaninae of family Lucanidae. It was discovered by Frederic Parry in 1864.

== Geographical distribution ==
It can be found in Turkey.
