= Dactylopteryx orientalis =

Scientific classification
- Domain: Eukaryota
- Kingdom: Animalia
- Phylum: Arthropoda
- Class: Insecta
- Order: Mantodea
- Family: Dactylopterygidae
- Genus: Dactylopteryx
- Species: D. orientalis

Binomial name
- Dactylopteryx orientalis Werner, 1906

Species of praying mantis

Dactylopteryx orientalis is a species of praying mantis in the family Dactylopterygidae.

== See also ==
- List of mantis genera and species
