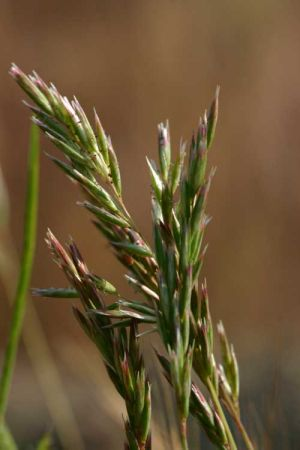
- Schismus barbatus

Scientific classification
- Kingdom: Plantae
- Clade: Tracheophytes
- Clade: Angiosperms
- Clade: Monocots
- Clade: Commelinids
- Order: Poales
- Family: Poaceae
- Subfamily: Danthonioideae
- Tribe: Danthonieae
- Genus: Schismus; P.Beauv.

Type species
- Schismus marginatus (syn of S. barbatus) P.Beauv.

Synonyms
- Electra Panz. 1813, illegitimate homonym not Noronha 1790 (Sapindaceae) nor DC. 1836 (Asteraceae); Hemisacris Steud.

= Schismus =

Genus of grasses

Schismus is a genus of African and Eurasian plants in the grass family. Two species are naturalized in North America, where they are known as Mediterranean grass.

Species

- Schismus arabicus - Greece, North Africa, East Africa, Asia (from Saudi Arabia to Xinjiang); naturalized in scattered locations in Australia, United States, Mexico, Chile, Argentina
- Schismus barbatus - Mediterranean and neighboring regions (from Canary Islands to Tibet); South Africa; naturalized in scattered locations in Australia, United States, Mexico, Chile, Argentina
- Schismus inermis - South Africa
- Schismus scaberrimus - South Africa
- Schismus schismoides - South Africa, Namibia

Formerly included

see Deschampsia Disakisperma Tribolium

- Schismus gouanii - Deschampsia media
- Schismus patens - Disakisperma dubium
- Schismus pleuropogon - Tribolium pleuropogon
- Schismus villarsii - Deschampsia media
