= Capeochloa =

Scientific classification
- Kingdom: Plantae
- Clade: Tracheophytes
- Clade: Angiosperms
- Clade: Monocots
- Clade: Commelinids
- Order: Poales
- Family: Poaceae
- Subfamily: Danthonioideae
- Tribe: Danthonieae
- Genus: Capeochloa; H.P.Linder & N.P.Barker

Type species
- Capeochloa cincta (Nees) N.P. Barker & H.P.Linder

Genus of grasses

Capeochloa is a genus of South African plants in the grass family. It contains three species of perennial grasses endemic to the Cape Provinces.

Species

- Capeochloa arundinacea (P.J.Bergius) N.P.Barker & H.P.Linder
- Capeochloa cincta (Nees) N.P.Barker & H.P.Linder
- Capeochloa setacea (N.P.Barker) N.P.Barker & H.P.Linder

== See also ==
- List of Poaceae genera
