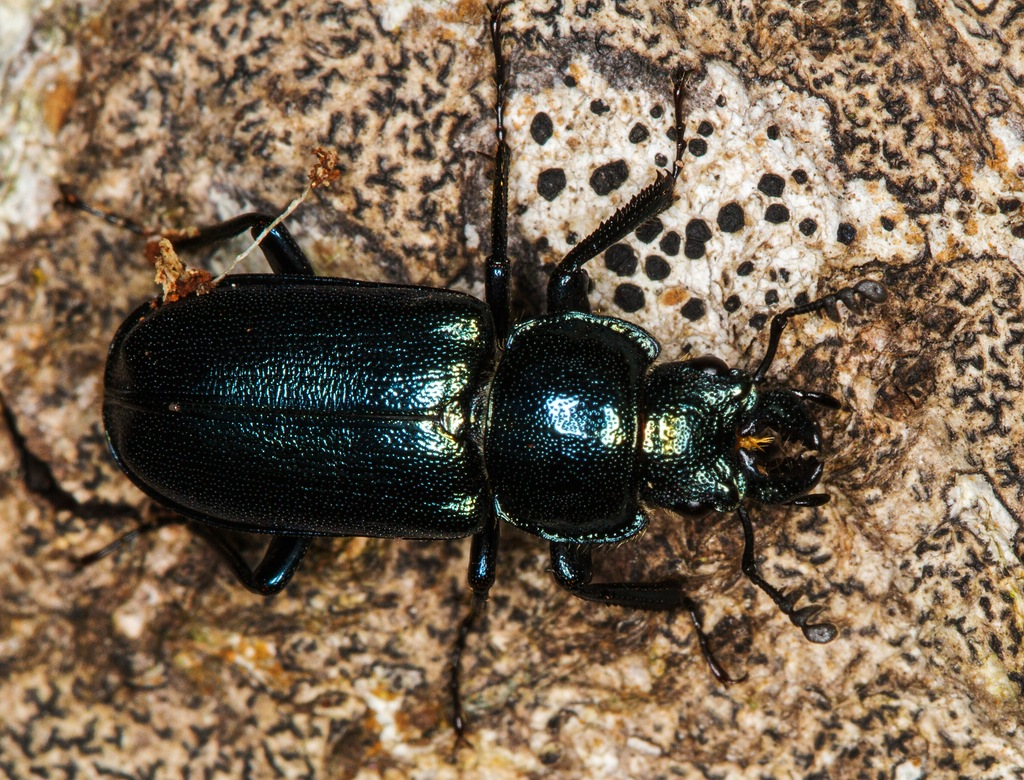

Scientific classification
- Kingdom: Animalia
- Phylum: Arthropoda
- Class: Insecta
- Order: Coleoptera
- Suborder: Polyphaga
- Infraorder: Scarabaeiformia
- Family: Lucanidae
- Genus: Platycerus
- Species: P. hongwonpyoi

Binomial name
- Platycerus hongwonpyoi Imura & Choe, 1989

= Platycerus hongwonpyoi =

Species of beetle

Platycerus hongwonpyoi is a species of stag beetle, from the Lucinidae family and Lucaninae subfamily. It was discovered in Korea by Imura and Choe in 1989.

The species has numerous sub-species, including:

- Platycerus hongwonpyoi dabashanensis (Okuda, 1997)
- Platycerus hongwonpyoi funiuensis (Imura, 2005)
- Platycerus hongwonpyoi merkli (Imura & Choe, 1989)
- Platycerus hongwonpyoi mongolicus (Imura & Bartolozzi, 2006)
- Platycerus hongwonpyoi quanbaoshanus (Imura, 2011)
- Platycerus hongwonpyoi quinlingensis (Imura, 1993)
- Platycerus hongwonpyoi shennongjianus (Imura, 2008)
