= Danthonia holm-nielsenii =

Conservation status
- Vulnerable (IUCN 3.1)

Scientific classification
- Kingdom: Plantae
- Clade: Tracheophytes
- Clade: Angiosperms
- Clade: Monocots
- Clade: Commelinids
- Order: Poales
- Family: Poaceae
- Genus: Danthonia
- Species: D. holm-nielsenii

Binomial name
- Danthonia holm-nielsenii Lægaard

Species of grass

Danthonia holm-nielsenii is a species of grass in the family Poaceae. It is found only in Ecuador.
