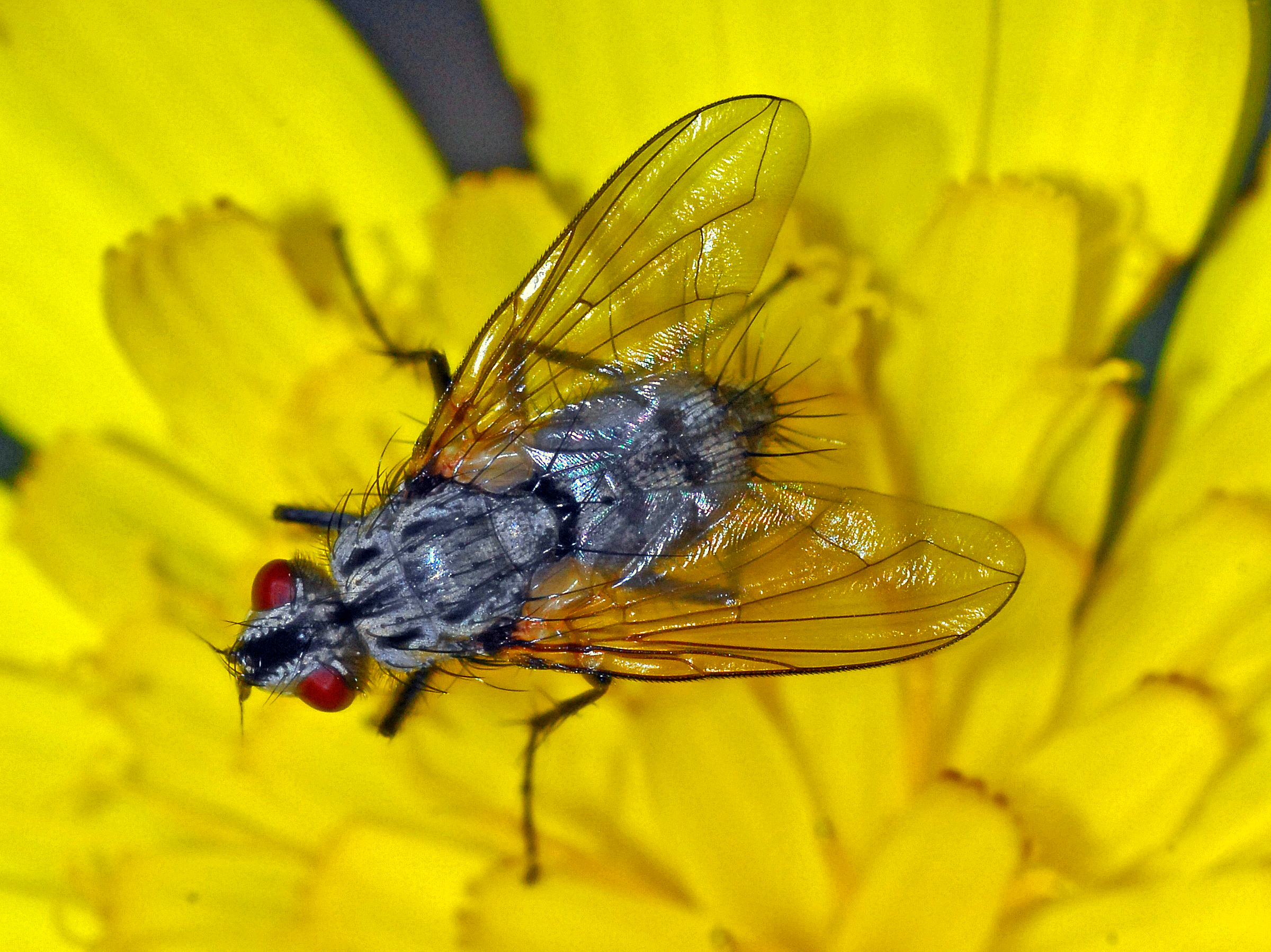
- In Italy

Scientific classification
- Kingdom: Animalia
- Phylum: Arthropoda
- Class: Insecta
- Order: Diptera
- Family: Tachinidae
- Subfamily: Dexiinae
- Tribe: Dexiini
- Genus: Dinera
- Species: D. carinifrons

Binomial name
- Dinera carinifrons (Fallén, 1817)

Synonyms
- Amyclaea serva Robineau-Desvoidy, 1863; Dinera cinerea Robineau-Desvoidy, 1863; Dinera grisea Robineau-Desvoidy, 1830; Musca carinifrons Fallén, 1817; Myocera anthophila Robineau-Desvoidy, 1830; Myocera grisescens Robineau-Desvoidy, 1830

= Dinera carinifrons =

Species of fly

Dinera carinifrons is a species of fly in the family Tachinidae. It is found in Europe and Asia.

== Distribution and habitat ==
This species has a transpalaearctic distribution and it is present in most of Europe (northwards to Scotland) and in Asia (Mongolia). It especially occurs in high altitudes of the Alps.

== Description ==
Dinera carinifrons can reach a body length of about 6.5–10.8 mm (0.26–0.43 in). In these rather large flies, the thorax, abdomen, and legs are black with a dense microtrichosity and relatively broader frons and parafacial. Abdomen shows a light tessellate appearance, with syntergite 1+2 excavated, 3+3 dorsocentral setae present and undeveloped costal seta. This species is very similar to Dinera fuscata.
