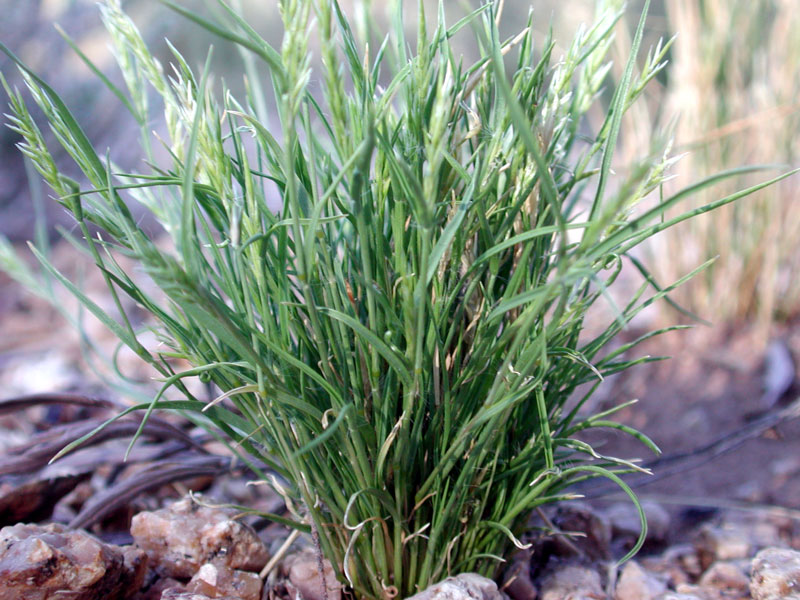

Scientific classification
- Kingdom: Plantae
- Clade: Tracheophytes
- Clade: Angiosperms
- Clade: Monocots
- Clade: Commelinids
- Order: Poales
- Family: Poaceae
- Genus: Schismus
- Species: S. barbatus

Binomial name
- Schismus barbatus (Loefl. ex L.) Thell.

= Schismus barbatus =

Species of grass

Schismus barbatus is a species of grass known as common Mediterranean grass and kelch-grass. It is native to Eurasia, and it is also known as an introduced species in the southwestern United States. It grows in many habitats, including disturbed areas. It is an annual grass growing in small clumps. The stems grow up to 27 centimeters long and are lined with threadlike leaves. The short inflorescence bears spikelets under a centimeter long.
