= Chimaerochloa =

Scientific classification
- Kingdom: Plantae
- Clade: Tracheophytes
- Clade: Angiosperms
- Clade: Monocots
- Clade: Commelinids
- Order: Poales
- Family: Poaceae
- Subfamily: Danthonioideae
- Tribe: Danthonieae
- Genus: Chimaerochloa; H.P.Linder
- Species: C. archboldii

Binomial name
- Chimaerochloa archboldii (Hitchc.) Pirie & H.P. Linder

Synonyms
- Danthonia archboldii Hitchc.

Genus of grasses

Chimaerochloa is a genus of New Guinean plants in the grass family.

The genus name of Chimaerochloa is named after Chimera (mythology) as Linder noted; "the grass takes an the appearance of different genera, depending on which character set is investigated. Thus, it can be regarded as a grass that changes its appearance, a chimaera".

The genus was circumscribed by Hans Peter Linder in Ann. Missouri Bot. Gard. Vol.97 (Issue 3) on page 346 in 2010.

== Species ==
The only known species is Chimaerochloa archboldii.
