= Phaenanthoecium =

Scientific classification
- Kingdom: Plantae
- Clade: Tracheophytes
- Clade: Angiosperms
- Clade: Monocots
- Clade: Commelinids
- Order: Poales
- Family: Poaceae
- Subfamily: Danthonioideae
- Tribe: Danthonieae
- Genus: Phaenanthoecium; C.E.Hubb.
- Species: P. koestlinii

Binomial name
- Phaenanthoecium koestlinii (Hochst. ex A.Rich.) C.E.Hubb.

Synonyms
- Danthonia koestlinii Hochst. ex A.Rich.; Streblochaete schimperi Hochst. ex Steud.; Streblochaete koestlinii T.Durand & Schinz

Genus of grasses

Phaenanthoecium is a genus of plants in the grass family. The only known species is Phaenanthoecium koestlinii, native to Northeast Tropical Africa (Sudan, Ethiopia and Eritrea) and Yemen.
