= Notochloe =

Scientific classification
- Kingdom: Plantae
- Clade: Tracheophytes
- Clade: Angiosperms
- Clade: Monocots
- Clade: Commelinids
- Order: Poales
- Family: Poaceae
- Subfamily: Danthonioideae
- Tribe: Danthonieae
- Genus: Notochloe; Domin
- Species: N. microdon

Binomial name
- Notochloe microdon (Benth.) Domin

Synonyms
- Triraphis microdon Benth.; Triodia microdon (Benth.) F.Muell.; Sieglingia microdon (Benth.) Kuntze

Genus of grasses

Notochloe is a genus of Australian plants in the grass family. The only known species is Notochloe microdon, found only in New South Wales.
