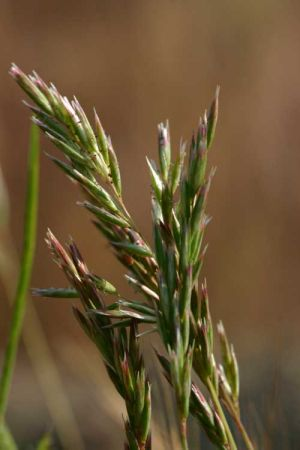

Scientific classification
- Kingdom: Plantae
- Clade: Tracheophytes
- Clade: Angiosperms
- Clade: Monocots
- Clade: Commelinids
- Order: Poales
- Family: Poaceae
- Genus: Schismus
- Species: S. arabicus

Binomial name
- Schismus arabicus Nees

= Schismus arabicus =

Species of plant

Schismus arabicus is a species of grass known by the common name Arabian schismus. It is native to northern Africa, temperate Asia, and it is also known as an introduced species in the southwestern United States. It grows in many types of habitat, including disturbed areas. It is an annual grass with stems growing up to 16 centimeters long and lined with threadlike leaves. The short inflorescence bears spikelets under a centimeter long.
