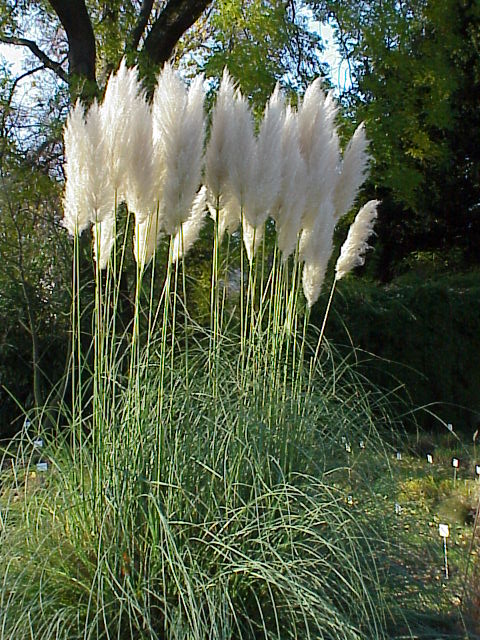
- Pampas grass (Cortaderia selloana)

Scientific classification
- Kingdom: Plantae
- Clade: Tracheophytes
- Clade: Angiosperms
- Clade: Monocots
- Clade: Commelinids
- Order: Poales
- Family: Poaceae
- Clade: PACMAD clade
- Subfamily: Danthonioideae; Barker & H.P.Linder
- Tribe: Danthonieae; Zotov

= Danthonioideae =

Subfamily of plants

Danthonioideae is a mainly Southern Hemisphere subfamily of grasses, containing the single tribe Danthonieae and one unplaced genus, with altogether roughly 300 species. It includes herbaceous to partially woody perennial or annual (less common) grasses that grow in open grasslands, shrublands, and woodlands. It belongs to the PACMAD clade of grasses, but unlike some other lineages in that clade, grasses in the Danthonioideae exclusively use the C_{3} photosynthetic pathway. Its sister group is the subfamily Chloridoideae.

There are 19 genera, 18 of which are placed in tribe Danthonieae, while one is as yet unplaced (incertae sedis). The relationships within the group are complicated; conflicting phylogenetic evidence from nuclear and chloroplast DNA suggests that hybridisation events played an important role in the Danthonioideae.

- incertae sedis:
  Danthonidium
- tribe Danthonieae:
  Austroderia, Capeochloa, Chaetobromus, Chimaerochloa, Chionochloa, Cortaderia (syn. Lamprothyrsus), Danthonia, Geochloa, Merxmuellera, Notochloe, Pentameris (syn. Pentaschistis, Poagrostis, Prionanthium), Phaenanthoecium, Plinthanthesis, Pseudopentameris, Rytidosperma (syn. Austrodanthonia, Monostachya, Notodanthonia, Pyrrhantherea), Schismus (syn. Karroochloa), Tenaxia, Tribolium
