= Platycerus oregonensis =

- A male
- A female

Conservation status
- Unranked (NatureServe)

Scientific classification
- Kingdom: Animalia
- Phylum: Arthropoda
- Clade: Pancrustacea
- Class: Insecta
- Order: Coleoptera
- Suborder: Polyphaga
- Infraorder: Scarabaeiformia
- Family: Lucanidae
- Genus: Platycerus
- Species: P. oregonensis

Binomial name
- Platycerus oregonensis Westwood, 1844

Synonyms
- Platycerus coerulescens LeConte, 1869; Platycerus chalybaeus Casey, 1897

Species of beetle

Platycerus oregonensis, or the Oregon stag beetle, is a small species of stag beetle from the subfamily Lucaninae. It was discovered by John O. Westwood in 1844.

== Taxonomy ==
The Oregon stag beetle was discovered and described in 1844 in the U.S. state of Oregon by entomologist John O. Westwood. In 1946, two other Platycerus species; P. coerulescens and P. chalybaeus, were found to be synonymous with this species (i.e., the same species). There are 16 specimens known across 6 museums and laboratories.

== Description ==
=== Larva ===
The larvae of the Oregon stag beetle are similar to other scarabaeoid beetles, with nine light gray body segments and two anal plates. These anal plates each have a black spot in the middle. The sides of the body are slightly compressed. The round head is wider than it is long, and are capped with three-segmented antennae. The segments of the antennae decrease in size, with the first being the largest. In this stage, the mouthparts, called mandibles, are short and wide, possessing two teeth. The mandibles have black markings on the sides and tips.

=== Adult ===
Males of this species measure between 11.2 and 15.4 mm (0.44 and 0.61 in) in length, while females measure 9.6 to 13.9 mm (0.38 to 0.55 in). The mandibles of this species are relatively consistent between individuals, which is unique among the genus Platycerus. The cylindrical mandibles are longer than the head, do not have denticles (bumps) on the inside, curve gently, and are bent slightly upwards. Males of differing sizes may have differently shaped teeth. The head is somewhat rectangular, with its widest portion being just behind the eyes. The pronotum (segment behind the head) is roughly square in shape. The head and pronotum are both black in color, with a few small holes. The elytra (wing covers) are blue, except in a population in coastal Oregon, which is black and green.

This species may be distinguished from others in the genus by its lack of denticles on the mandibles in addition to its relatively long mandibles and the blue or green elytra.

== Distribution ==
The Oregon stag beetle is found across western North America, from British Columbia in the north to California in the south.

== Ecology ==
As larvae, the Oregon stag beetle feeds on soft decaying wood, and is not known to harm live plants. It has specifically been observed to eat wood from maple, California holly, madrone, live oak, blue gum, and red alder.
