= Danthonidium =

Scientific classification
- Kingdom: Plantae
- Clade: Tracheophytes
- Clade: Angiosperms
- Clade: Monocots
- Clade: Commelinids
- Order: Poales
- Family: Poaceae
- Subfamily: Danthonioideae
- Genus: Danthonidium; C.E.Hubb.
- Species: D. gammiei

Binomial name
- Danthonidium gammiei (Bhide) C.E.Hubb.

Synonyms
- Danthonia gammiei Bhide

Genus of grasses

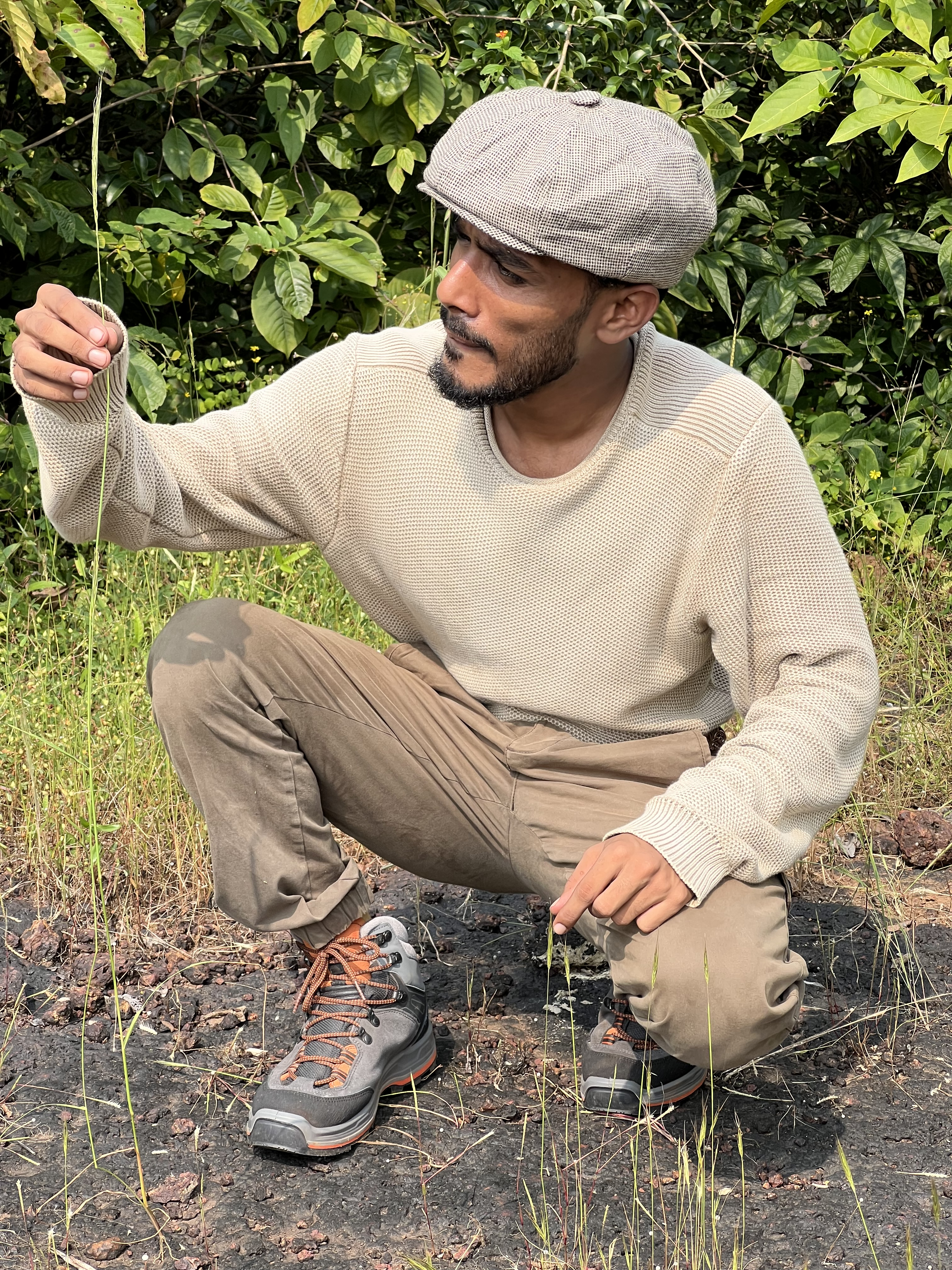
Mr. Shahid Nawaz Landge collecting Danthonidium gammiei in its natural habitat in the Western Ghats of India.

Danthonidium is a genus of Indian plants in the grass family. The only known species is Danthonidium gammiei, native to the State of Maharashtra in India.
