= Geochloa =

Scientific classification
- Kingdom: Plantae
- Clade: Tracheophytes
- Clade: Angiosperms
- Clade: Monocots
- Clade: Commelinids
- Order: Poales
- Family: Poaceae
- Subfamily: Danthonioideae
- Tribe: Danthonieae
- Genus: Geochloa; N.P.Barker & H.P.Linder

Type species
- Geochloa lupulina (L.f.) N.P.Barker & H.P.Linder

Genus of grasses

Geochloa is a genus of South African plants in the grass family.

Species

- Geochloa decora (Nees) N.P.Barker & H.P.Linder - Cape Province
- Geochloa lupulina (L.f.) N.P.Barker & H.P.Linder - Cape Province
- Geochloa rufa (Nees) N.P.Barker & H.P.Linder - Cape Province

== See also ==
- List of Poaceae genera
