= Platycerus delagrangei =

Scientific classification
- Kingdom: Animalia
- Phylum: Arthropoda
- Class: Insecta
- Order: Coleoptera
- Suborder: Polyphaga
- Infraorder: Scarabaeiformia
- Family: Lucanidae
- Genus: Platycerus
- Species: P. delagrangei

Binomial name
- Platycerus delagrangei Fairmaire, 1892

Species of beetle

Platycerus delagrangei is a species of stag beetle, from the Lucinidae family and Lucaninae subfamily. It was discovered by Léon Fairmaire in 1892.

== Geographical distribution ==
It can be found in Syria and Turkey.
