= Platycerus cribripennis =

Scientific classification
- Domain: Eukaryota
- Kingdom: Animalia
- Phylum: Arthropoda
- Class: Insecta
- Order: Coleoptera
- Suborder: Polyphaga
- Infraorder: Scarabaeiformia
- Family: Lucanidae
- Genus: Platycerus
- Species: P. cribripennis

Binomial name
- Platycerus cribripennis Van Dyke, 1928

Species of beetle

Platycerus cribripennis is a species of stag beetle, from the Lucinidae family and Lucaninae subfamily. It was discovered by Van Dyke in 1928.

== Geographical distribution ==
It can be found in North America.
