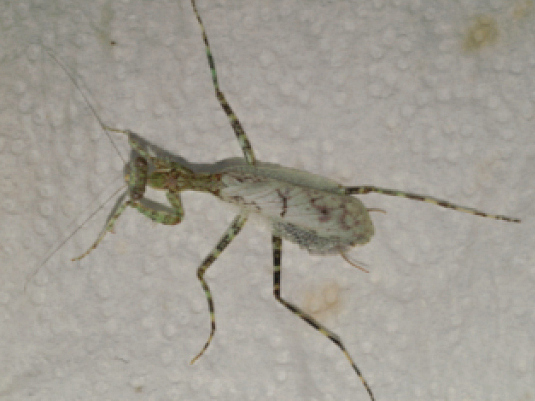
- Dactylopteryx flexuosa

Scientific classification
- Kingdom: Animalia
- Phylum: Arthropoda
- Clade: Pancrustacea
- Class: Insecta
- Order: Mantodea
- Family: Dactylopterygidae
- Genus: Dactylopteryx; Karsch, 1892

Synonyms
- Phloeomantis Giglio-Tos, 1915

= Dactylopteryx =

Genus of praying mantises

Dactylopteryx is the type genus of praying mantids in the revived family Dactylopterygidae. The oldest documented instance of the species appeared in "Annual issues of the Association for Patriotic Natural History in Württemberg", by Werner Karl Frederick Hall.

== Species ==
The Mantodea Species File lists:

- Dactylopteryx flexuosa Karsch, 1892
- Dactylopteryx intermedia Beier, 1963
- Dactylopteryx orientalis Werner, 1906
