= Platycerus depressus =

Scientific classification
- Domain: Eukaryota
- Kingdom: Animalia
- Phylum: Arthropoda
- Class: Insecta
- Order: Coleoptera
- Suborder: Polyphaga
- Infraorder: Scarabaeiformia
- Family: Lucanidae
- Genus: Platycerus
- Species: P. depressus

Binomial name
- Platycerus depressus LeConte, 1850

Species of beetle

Platycerus depressus is a species of stag beetle, from the Lucinidae family and Lucaninae subfamily. It was discovered by Joseph LeConte in 1850.

== Geographical distribution ==
It can be found in North America.
