= Pentameris pictigluma =

Scientific classification
- Kingdom: Plantae
- Clade: Tracheophytes
- Clade: Angiosperms
- Clade: Monocots
- Clade: Commelinids
- Order: Poales
- Family: Poaceae
- Genus: Pentameris
- Species: P. pictigluma

Binomial name
- Pentameris pictigluma (Steud.) Galley & H.P.Linder

Varieties
- See text.

Synonyms
- Of the species: Aira pictigluma Steud.; Danthonia anthoxanthiformis Hochst., nom. superfl.; Pentaschistis pictigluma (Steud.) Pilg.; Of var. gracilis: Pentaschistis gracilis S.M.Phillips; Pentaschistis pictigluma var. gracilis (S.M.Phillips) S.M.Phillips; Of var. mannii: Pentaschistis mannii Stapf ex C.E.Hubb.; Pentaschistis pictigluma var. mannii (Stapf ex C.E.Hubb.) S.M.Phillips; Of var. pictigluma: Danthonia depressa Hochst.; Danthonia nana Engl.; Danthonia trisetoides var. hackelii Engl.; Danthonia trisetoides var. schimperi Engl.; Danthonia uberior Hochst.; Pentaschistis imatongensis C.E.Hubb.; Pentaschistis trisetoides var. schimperi (Engl.) Pilg.

Species of plant

Pentameris pictigluma is a species of flowering plant in the family Poaceae, native to Cameroon in West Africa, Ethiopia to Tanzania in East Africa, and Yemen. It was first described by Ernst Gottlieb von Steudel in 1854 as Aira pictigluma.

== Varieties ==
As of February 2023, Plants of the World Online accepted the following varieties:

- Pentameris pictigluma var. gracilis (S.M.Phillips) Galley & H.P.Linder – Ethiopia and Kenya
- Pentameris pictigluma var. mannii (Stapf ex C.E.Hubb.) Galley & H.P.Linder – Cameroon
- Pentameris pictigluma var. pictigluma – Ethiopia, Kenya, Rwanda, Sudan, Tanzania, Uganda and Yemen

== Conservation ==
Under the synonym Pentaschistis mannii, Pentameris pictigluma var. mannii, endemic to Cameroon, was assessed as "near threatened" in the 2000 IUCN Red List.
