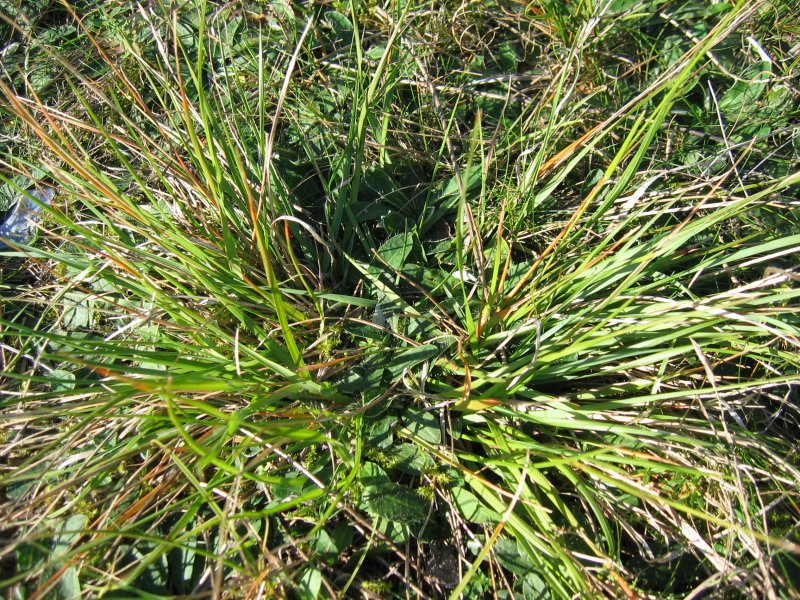
- Habitus
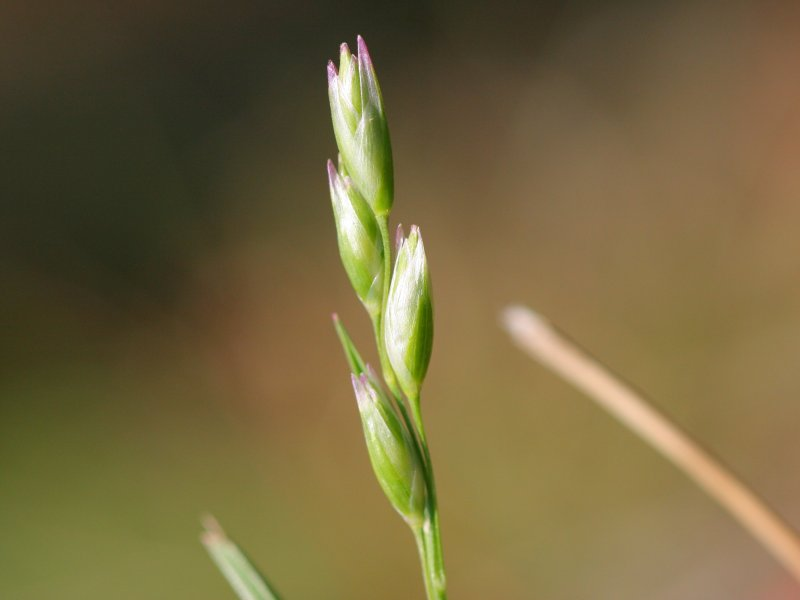
- Spikelets

Scientific classification
- Kingdom: Plantae
- Clade: Tracheophytes
- Clade: Angiosperms
- Clade: Monocots
- Clade: Commelinids
- Order: Poales
- Family: Poaceae
- Genus: Danthonia
- Species: D. decumbens

Binomial name
- Danthonia decumbens (L.) DC.

Synonyms
- Avena spicata All. ex Kunth [Invalid]; Brachatera decumbens (L.) Desv.; Bromus decumbens Koeler; Danthonia decipiens (O.Schwarz & Bassler) Á.Löve & D.Löve; Danthonia glaberrima (Post) Valdés & H.Scholz; Festuca decumbens L.; Melica decumbens (L.) Weber; Melica rigida Wibel [Illegitimate]; Poa decumbens (L.) Scop.; Sieglingia decumbens (L.) Bernh.; Triodia decumbens (L.) P.Beauv.; Triodia glaberrima Post; Triodon decumbens (L.) Baumg. [Invalid]

= Danthonia decumbens =

Species of grass

Danthonia decumbens (formerly Sieglingia decumbens) is a species of grass commonly known as the heath grass, heath-grass, or staggers grass It is a tussock grass native to Europe and adjacent parts of Asia and North Africa. It may also be native to Newfoundland and Nova Scotia.

== Description ==
Danthonia decumbens is a perennial plant with a decumbent habit; it lies on the ground with the tips turned upward.

It has narrow, bright green leaves taper to a sharp point and are rather hairy. A long upper leaf sheath clasps the delicate stem. The stem is 15–30 centimetres (5.9–11.8 in) high and slightly bent at the base, smooth with 1 to 3 nodes.

The ligule consists of a ring of hairs, as in the purple moor grass, Molinia caerulea, except that in this plant each end has a tuft of longer hairs.

The panicle consists of 4 or 5 large erect glaucous silvery green or purplish awnless spikelets. These are arranged alternately on the upper part of the stem. The bunchgrass flowers in the summer months.

== Ecology ==
The plant is found on acid pastures and heathland, on sandy or peat soils, which are also often damp.

The grass, having no domestic forage value, is not grown agriculturally.
