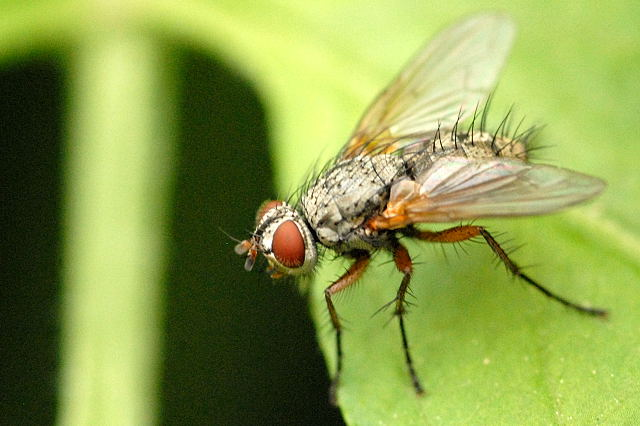

Scientific classification
- Kingdom: Animalia
- Phylum: Arthropoda
- Class: Insecta
- Order: Diptera
- Family: Tachinidae
- Subfamily: Dexiinae
- Tribe: Dexiini
- Genus: Dinera
- Species: D. grisescens

Binomial name
- Dinera grisescens (Fallén, 1817)

Synonyms
- Dinera arida Robineau-Desvoidy, 1863; Dinera futilis West, 1924; Dinera punctata Robineau-Desvoidy, 1830; Dinera pygmaea Robineau-Desvoidy, 1830; Dinera rufifrons Rondani, 1862; Dinera zetterstedtii Robineau-Desvoidy, 1863; Musca grisescens Fallén, 1817; Tachina denotans Walker, 1853

= Dinera grisescens =

Species of fly

Dinera grisescens is a species of fly in the family Tachinidae.

== Distribution ==
Canada, Kyrgyzstan, Tajikistan, Uzbekistan, China, British Isles, Czech Republic, Hungary, Moldova, Poland, Romania, Slovakia, Ukraine, Denmark, Finland, Norway, Sweden, Bosnia and Herzegovina, Bulgaria, Italy, Portugal, Serbia, Spain, Austria, Belgium, France, Germany, Netherlands, Switzerland, Mongolia, Russia, Transcaucasia.
