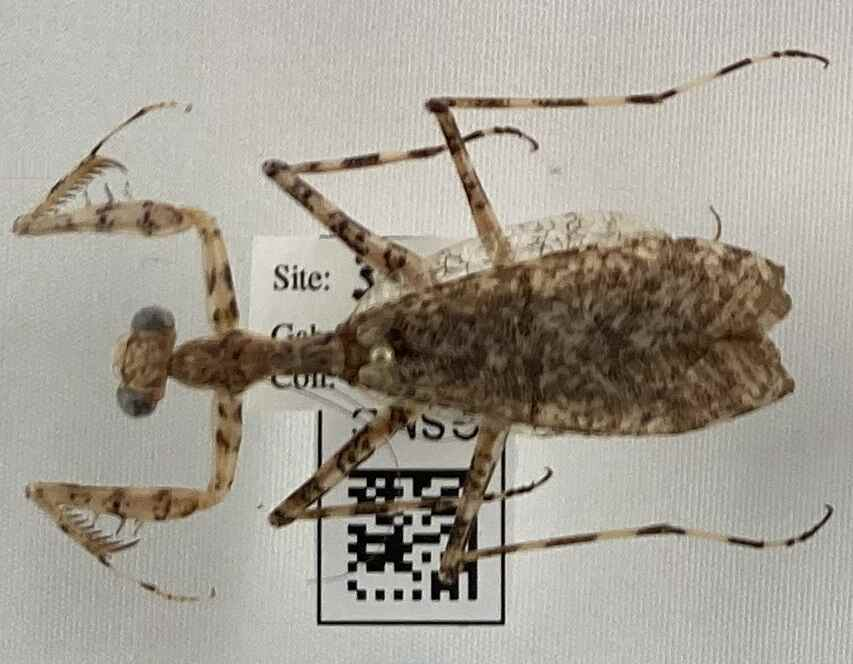

Scientific classification
- Kingdom: Animalia
- Phylum: Arthropoda
- Class: Insecta
- Order: Mantodea
- Family: Dactylopterygidae
- Genus: Dactylopteryx
- Species: D. flexuosa

Binomial name
- Dactylopteryx flexuosa Karsch, 1892

Synonyms
- Dactylopteryx angusticollis Sjostedt, 1900

= Dactylopteryx flexuosa =

Species of praying mantis

Dactylopteryx flexuosa is a species of praying mantis in the family Dactylopterygidae.

== See also ==
- List of mantis genera and species
