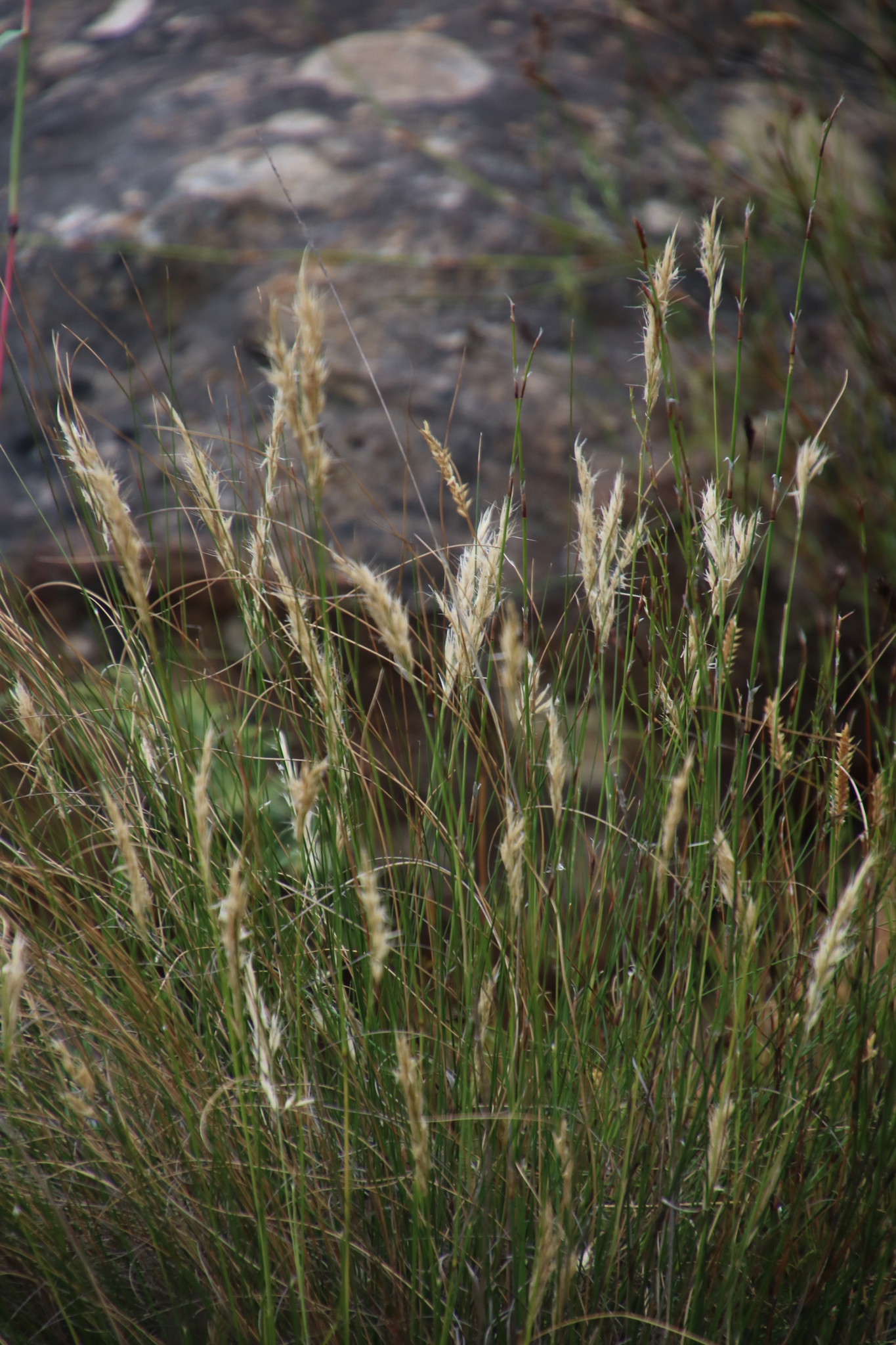
- Tenaxia stricta in South Africa

Scientific classification
- Kingdom: Plantae
- Clade: Tracheophytes
- Clade: Angiosperms
- Clade: Monocots
- Clade: Commelinids
- Order: Poales
- Family: Poaceae
- Subfamily: Danthonioideae
- Tribe: Danthonieae
- Genus: Tenaxia; N.P.Barker & H.P.Linder

Type species
- Tenaxia stricta (Schrad.) N.P.Barker & H.P.Linder

= Tenaxia =

Genus of grasses

Tenaxia is a genus of Asian and African plants in the grass family.

Species

- Tenaxia aureocephala (J.G.Anderson) N.P.Barker & H.P.Linder - KwaZulu-Natal
- Tenaxia cachemyriana (Jaub. & Spach) N.P.Barker & H.P.Linder - Afghanistan, Tibet, Tajikistan, Jammu and Kashmir, Nepal, Uttarakhand, Himachal Pradesh
- Tenaxia cumminsii (Hook.f.) N.P.Barker & H.P.Linder - Pakistan, Jammu and Kashmir, Nepal, Uttarakhand, Himachal Pradesh
- Tenaxia disticha (Nees) N.P.Barker & H.P.Linder - Zimbabwe, Cape Province, Lesotho, KwaZulu-Natal, Free State
- Tenaxia dura (Stapf) N.P.Barker & H.P.Linder - Cape Province
- Tenaxia guillarmodiae (Conert) N.P.Barker & H.P.Linder - Lesotho, KwaZulu-Natal, Free State
- Tenaxia stricta (Schrad.) N.P.Barker & H.P.Linder - KwaZulu-Natal, Lesotho, Namibia, Cape Province
- Tenaxia subulata (A.Rich.) N.P.Barker & H.P.Linder - Ethiopia, Yemen

== See also ==
- List of Poaceae genera
