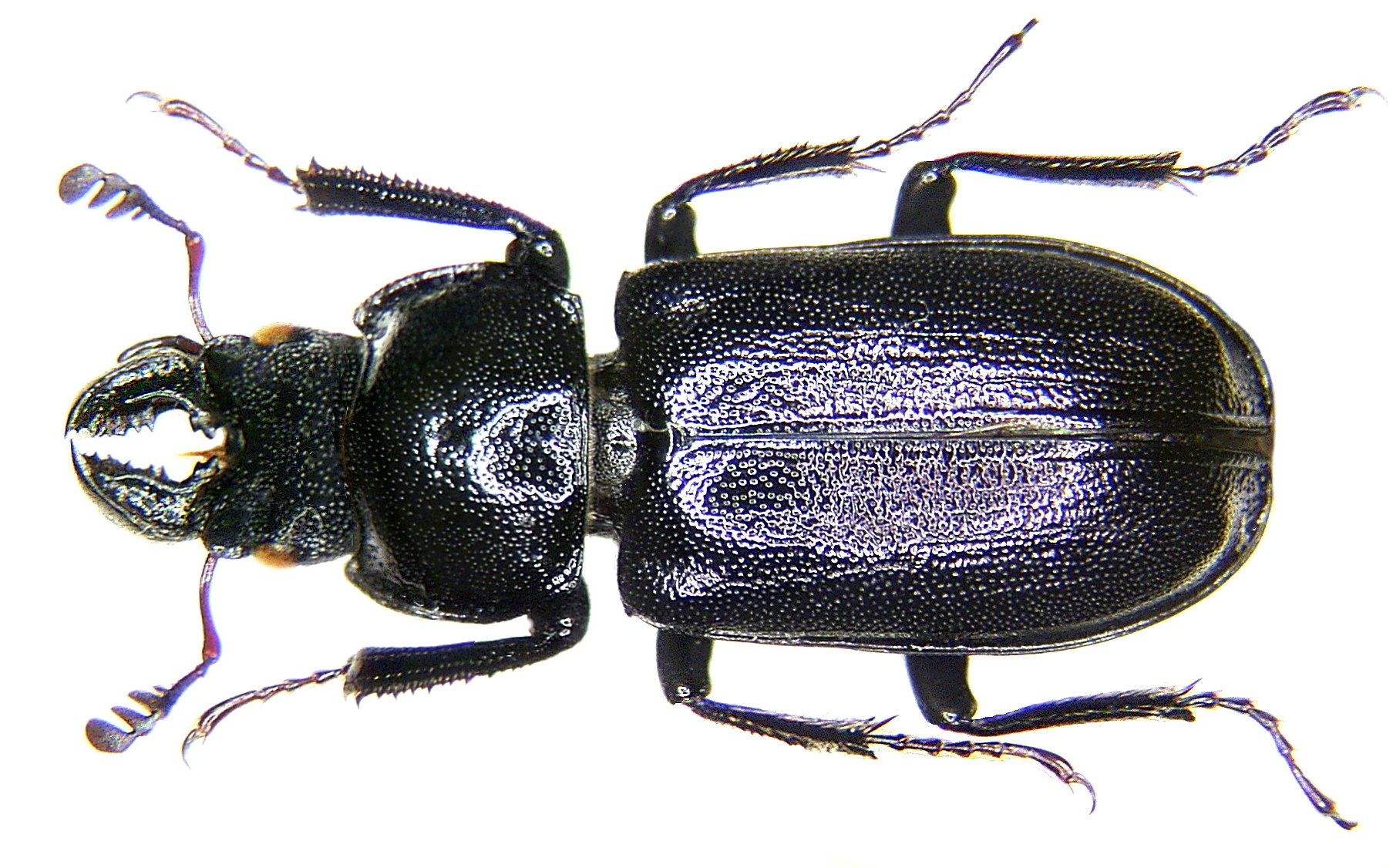

Scientific classification
- Domain: Eukaryota
- Kingdom: Animalia
- Phylum: Arthropoda
- Class: Insecta
- Order: Coleoptera
- Suborder: Polyphaga
- Infraorder: Scarabaeiformia
- Family: Lucanidae
- Genus: Platycerus
- Species: P. caprea

Binomial name
- Platycerus caprea (DeGeer, 1774)

= Platycerus caprea =

Species of beetle

Platycerus caprea is a species of beetle, from the subfamily Lucaninae of family Lucanidae. It was discovered by Charles De Geer in 1774, and was thus the first known member of its genus.

== Appearance ==
It has a dark blue body 10–13 mm in length, which is smaller than that of Platycerus caraboides, with which they are easy to confuse.

== Geographical distribution ==
It is Eurasian, and can be found in the Ural Mountains as well as in Turkey.
