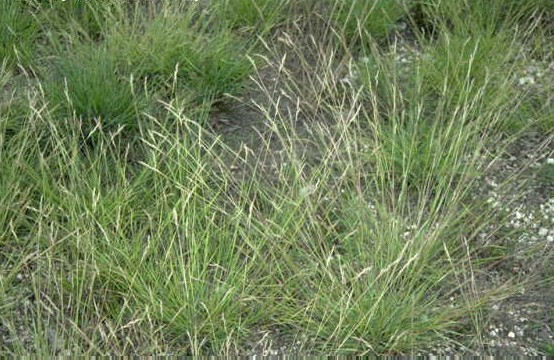

Conservation status
- Secure (NatureServe)

Scientific classification
- Kingdom: Plantae
- Clade: Tracheophytes
- Clade: Angiosperms
- Clade: Monocots
- Clade: Commelinids
- Order: Poales
- Family: Poaceae
- Genus: Danthonia
- Species: D. spicata

Binomial name
- Danthonia spicata (L.) P.Beauv. ex Roem. & Schult.

Synonyms
- Danthonia thermalis Avena spicata (L.) B. Fedtsch.

= Danthonia spicata =

Species of grass

Danthonia spicata is a species of grass known by the common name poverty oatgrass, or simply poverty grass. It is native to North America, where it is widespread and common in many areas. The species is distributed across much of Canada and the United States, and its distribution extends into northern Mexico.

This perennial bunchgrass is variable in appearance. It has no rhizomes or stolons. It grows anywhere from 7 to 100 cm (2.8 to 39 in) tall. The grass takes the form of a crowded tuft of leaves at ground level. The leaves often become curly and persist as they dry out. Plants in shady and moist areas may not have curly leaves. The inflorescence is a narrow panicle of up to 18 spikelets. The spikelets have twisted, hairy awns. There are also some unopening, cleistogamous florets next to the leaves, and in the panicles. There is a long-lasting soil seed bank, with the seeds persisting for decades before being stimulated to germinate.

This grass grows in many types of habitat, and it occurs in a variety of forest and grassland ecosystems. It grows easily on poor, dry, rocky soils, for which it owes its common name. When a habitat is disturbed, after a wildfire, for example, the seeds long-buried in the soil are stimulated and germinate, making the plant a pioneer species that colonizes recently cleared land. It then becomes less common as other plant species begin to move in. It is a common member of the plant community in some ecosystems that are maintained by a regime of frequent fires, such as jack pine (Pinus banksiana) barrens.
