= Bulletin of Insectology =

- Discipline: Entomology
- Language: English
- Edited by: Stefano Maini

Publication details
- Former names: Bollettino del Laboratorio di Entomologia del R. Istituto Superiore Agrario di Bologna, Bollettino dell'Istituto di Entomologia della R. Università degli Studi di Bologna, Bollettino dell'Istituto di Entomologia della Università degli Studi di Bologna, Bollettino dell'Istituto di Entomologia "Guido Grandi" della Università degli Studi di Bologna
- History: 1928–present
- Publisher: Dipartimento di Scienze e Tecnologie Agro-Alimentari, University of Bologna (Italy)
- Frequency: Biannually
- Open access: Yes
- License: CC BY-NC
- Impact factor: 1.711 (2020)

Standard abbreviations
- ISO 4: Bull. Insectology

Indexing
- ISSN: 1721-8861 (print); 2283-0332 (web)
- LCCN: 94650405
- OCLC no.: 936472698
- Bollettino del Laboratorio di Entomologia del R. Istituto Superiore Agrario di Bologna
- ISSN: 1120-0952
- Bollettino dell'Istituto di Entomologia della R. Università degli Studi di Bologna
- ISSN: 0373-5176
- Bollettino dell'Istituto di Entomologia della Università degli Studi di Bologna
- ISSN: 1120-0960
- Bollettino dell'Istituto di Entomologia "Guido Grandi" della Università degli Studi di Bologna
- ISSN: 1120-0979

Links
- Journal homepage; Online archive

The Bulletin of Insectology is a biannual peer-reviewed open access scientific journal of entomology covering morphology, biology, behaviour and physiology of insects and other arthropods; control of insects, mites, and other arthropod pests with particular reference to biocontrol and integrated pest management.

== History ==
The journal was established in 1928. It was subsequently known under different titles, before obtaining its current title in 2002:

- Bollettino del Laboratorio di Entomologia del R. Istituto Superiore Agrario di Bologna – from vol. 1 (1928) to vol. 7 (1934–1935)
- Bollettino dell'Istituto di Entomologia della R. Università degli Studi di Bologna – from vol. 8 (1935–1936) to vol. 14 (1942–1943)
- Bollettino dell'Istituto di Entomologia della Università degli Studi di Bologna – from vol. 15 (1944–1946) to vol. 37 (1983)
- Bollettino dell'Istituto di Entomologia "Guido Grandi" della Università degli Studi di Bologna – from vol. 38 (1984) to vol. 54 (2000)

== Abstracting and indexing ==
The journal is abstracted and indexed in:

- Aquatic Sciences and Fisheries Abstracts
- Biological Abstracts
- BIOSIS Previews
- CAB Abstracts
- Science Citation Index Expanded
- Scopus
- The Zoological Record

According to the Journal Citation Reports, the journal has a 2020 impact factor of 1.711.
