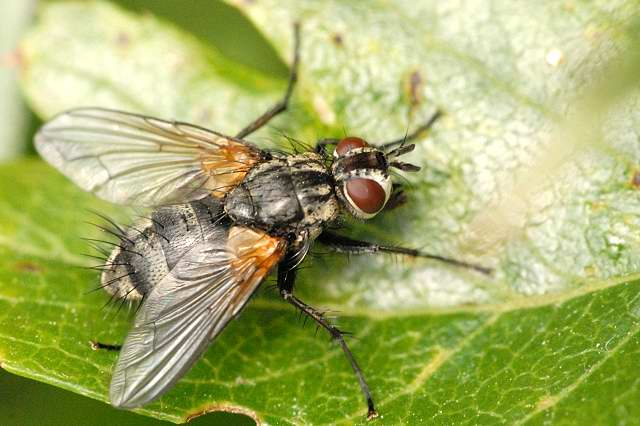
- Dinera ferina

Scientific classification
- Kingdom: Animalia
- Phylum: Arthropoda
- Class: Insecta
- Order: Diptera
- Family: Tachinidae
- Subfamily: Dexiinae
- Tribe: Dexiini
- Genus: Dinera; Robineau-Desvoidy, 1830

Type species
- Dinera grisea Robineau-Desvoidy, 1830

Synonyms
- Africodexia Townsend, 1933; Amyclaea Robineau-Desvoidy, 1863; Dynera Rondani, 1861; Myiocera Bezzi, 1906; Myiocera Rondani, 1868; Myocena Lioy, 1864; Myocera Robineau-Desvoidy, 1830; Myocerops Townsend, 1916; Phorostoma Robineau-Desvoidy, 1830

= Dinera =

Genus of flies

Dinera is a genus of flies in the family Tachinidae. Most larvae are parasitoids of Coleoptera (Scarabaeidae).

== Species ==
- Dinera alticola Zhang & Shima, 2006
- Dinera angustifrons Zhang & Shima, 2006
- Dinera brevipalpis Zhang & Shima, 2006
- Dinera carinifrons (Fallén, 1817)
- Dinera chaoi Zhang & Shima, 2006
- Dinera femoralis (Emden, 1947)
- Dinera ferina (Fallén, 1817)
- Dinera fulvotestacea (Villeneuve, 1943)
- Dinera fuscata Zhang & Shima, 2006
- Dinera grisescens (Fallén, 1817)
- Dinera latigena (Emden, 1947)
- Dinera longirostris Villeneuve, 1936
- Dinera lugens (Wiedemann, 1830)
- Dinera maculosa Zhang & Shima, 2006
- Dinera meridionalis Zhang & Shima, 2006
- Dinera miranda (Mesnil, 1963)
- Dinera orientalis Zhang & Shima, 2006
- Dinera palliventris (Emden, 1947)
- Dinera setifacies Zhang & Shima, 2006
- Dinera sichuanensis Zhang & Shima, 2006
- Dinera similis Zhang & Shima, 2006
- Dinera spinosa (Walker, 1858)
- Dinera suffulva (Villeneuve, 1943)
- Dinera takanoi (Mesnil, 1957)
- Dinera xuei Zhang & Shima, 2006
