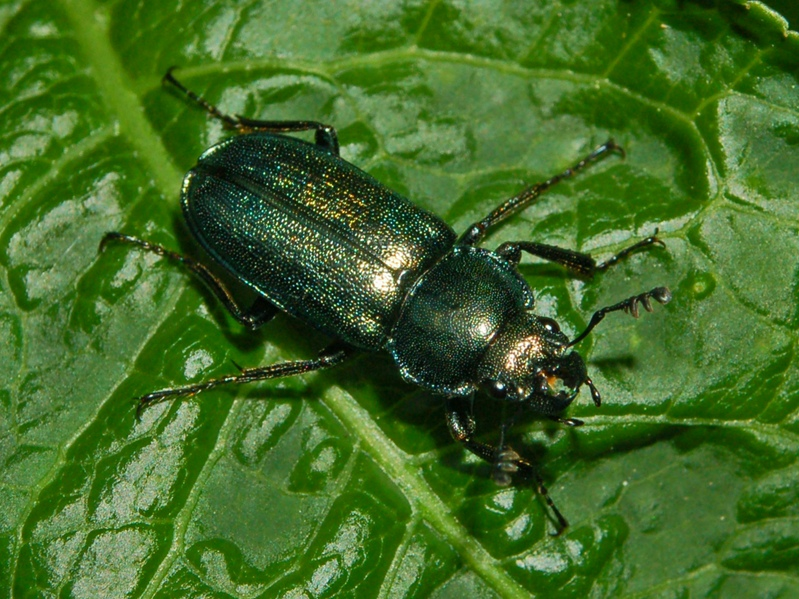
- Platycerus caraboides. Male

Scientific classification
- Kingdom: Animalia
- Phylum: Arthropoda
- Class: Insecta
- Order: Coleoptera
- Suborder: Polyphaga
- Infraorder: Scarabaeiformia
- Family: Lucanidae
- Genus: Platycerus
- Species: P. caraboides

Binomial name
- Platycerus caraboides (Linnaeus, 1758)

Synonyms
- Platycerus cribratus Mulsant & Rey, 1863; Systenocerus cribratus (Mulsant & Rey, 1863); Platycerus primigenius E. Weise, 1960

= Platycerus caraboides =

Species of beetle

Platycerus caraboides is a species of stag beetle belonging to the family Lucanidae, subfamily Lucaninae.

== Subspecies ==
Subspecies include:

- Platycerus caraboides caerulosus Didier & Ségui, 1953
- Platycerus caraboides caraboides (Linnaeus, 1758)

== Distribution ==
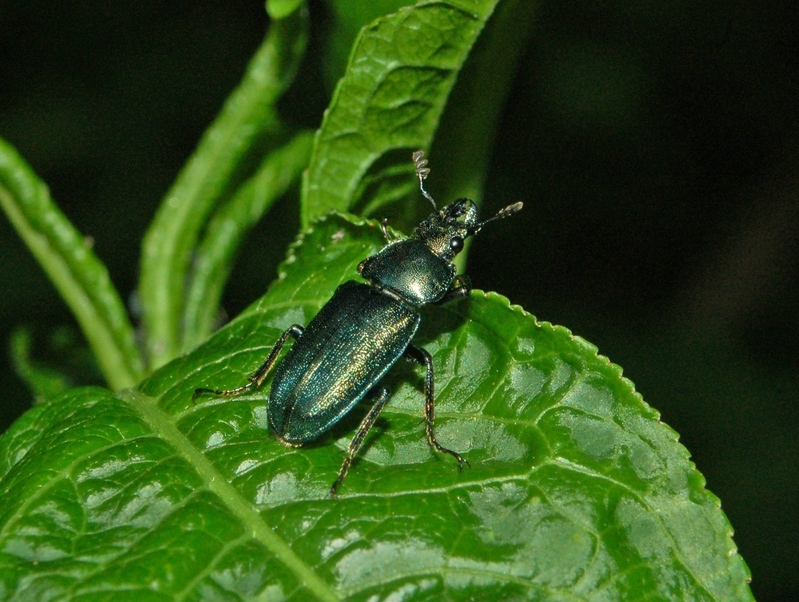
Platycerus caraboides

These beetles are present in most of Europe (Albania, Austria, Belgium, Bosnia and Herzegovina, Bulgaria, Croatia, Czech Republic, Denmark, Finland, France, Germany, Hungary, Italy, Luxembourg, the Republic of North Macedonia, Montenegro, Netherlands, Norway, Poland, Romania, Russia, Serbia, Slovakia, Slovenia, Spain, Sweden, Switzerland, Ukraine and United Kingdom), in Asia (China, Iran, Kazakhstan, Syria, Turkey) and in North Africa (Algeria, Morocco, Tunisia)

== Description ==
Platycerus caraboides can reach a body length of about 9–13 mm (0.35–0.51 in). These beetles have flat body, metallic black, steel blue or greenish. Antennae are geniculate, with a club of 3 items, Jaws are denticulate at the inner edge and also in the male they are shorter than the head. This species can be easily distinguished as a stag beetle by its geniculate (elbowed) antennae.

This species is very similar to Platycerus caprea (De Geer, 1774).

Video clip of P. caraboides on beech

== Biology ==
Adults can mostly be encountered from May through July, flying around during the day in deciduous forests or staying on the ground on rotten branches. The predominantly host-plants are broadleaf plants, but also conifers (mainly Pinus species). The larvae usually live on decayed wood of oak and beech.
