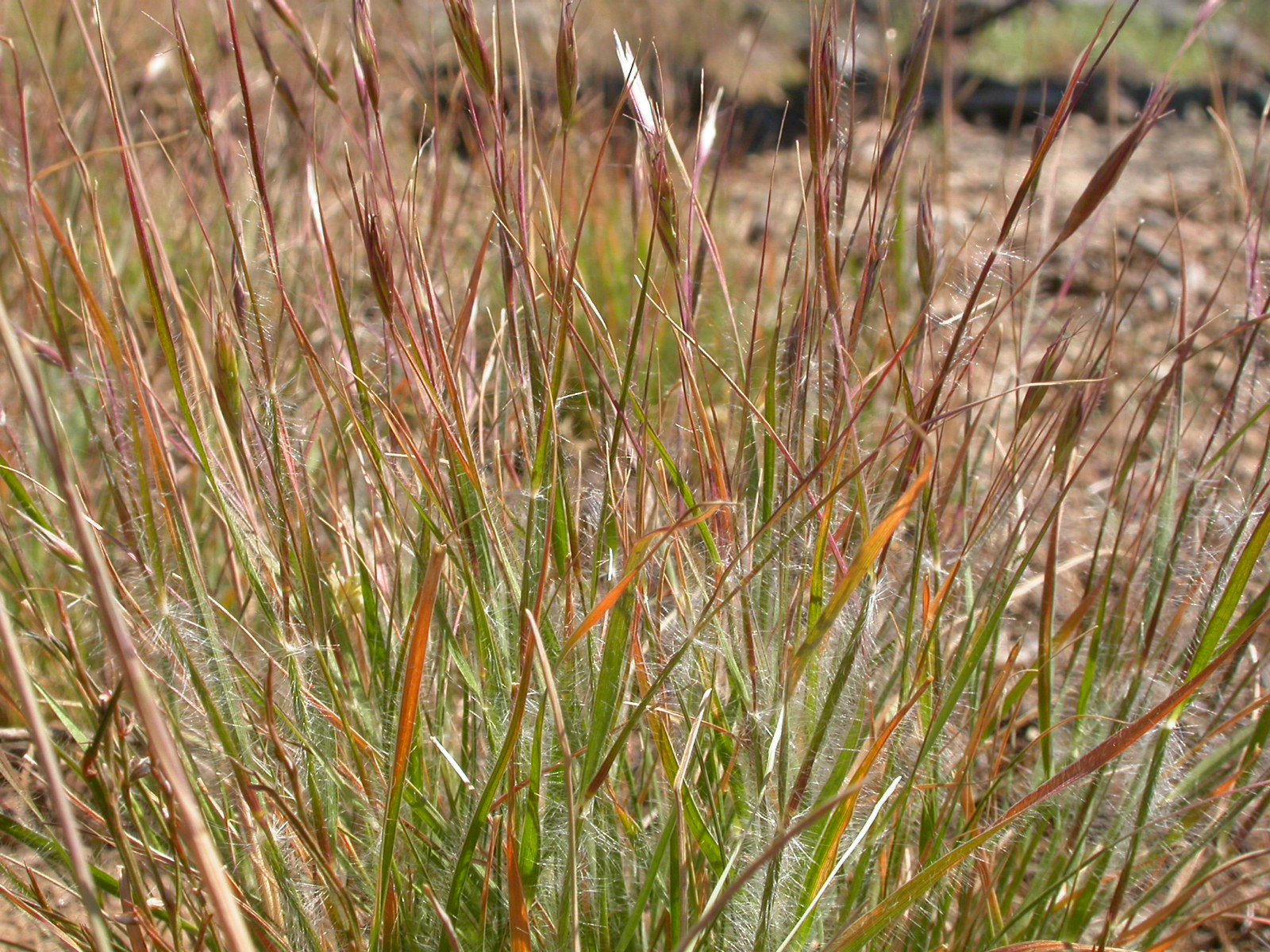
- The short stature of this bunchgrass, usually less than 15 cm tall, and the very hairy leaf sheaths (technically hirsute because the straight hairs diverge perpendicular to the surface of the leaf sheath) are diagnostic of this species.

Conservation status
- Secure (NatureServe)

Scientific classification
- Kingdom: Plantae
- Clade: Tracheophytes
- Clade: Angiosperms
- Clade: Monocots
- Clade: Commelinids
- Order: Poales
- Family: Poaceae
- Genus: Danthonia
- Species: D. unispicata

Binomial name
- Danthonia unispicata (Thurb.) Munro ex Macoun

= Danthonia unispicata =

Species of grass

Danthonia unispicata is a species of grass known by the common name onespike oatgrass, or onespike danthonia.

It is sometimes treated as a variety of Danthonia californica, to which it is similar. It is native to western North America, where it grows in several types of habitat, including grassland and open areas in mountain forests.

It is a perennial bunchgrass growing in clumps 10 to 30 centimeters tall, with very hairy, rolled leaves. The inflorescence bears a single spikelet, or sometimes up to four spikelets.
