= Pseudopentameris =

Scientific classification
- Kingdom: Plantae
- Clade: Tracheophytes
- Clade: Angiosperms
- Clade: Monocots
- Clade: Commelinids
- Order: Poales
- Family: Poaceae
- Subfamily: Danthonioideae
- Tribe: Danthonieae
- Genus: Pseudopentameris; Conert

Type species
- Pseudopentameris macrantha (Schrad.) Conert

Genus of grasses

Pseudopentameris is a genus of South African plants in the grass family, found only in Western Cape Province.

Species

- Pseudopentameris brachyphylla (Stapf) Conert
- Pseudopentameris caespitosa N.P. Barker
- Pseudopentameris macrantha (Schrad.) Conert
- Pseudopentameris obtusifolia (Hochst.) N.P. Barker
