= Plinthanthesis =

Wallaby grasses

Scientific classification
- Kingdom: Plantae
- Clade: Tracheophytes
- Clade: Angiosperms
- Clade: Monocots
- Clade: Commelinids
- Order: Poales
- Family: Poaceae
- Subfamily: Danthonioideae
- Tribe: Danthonieae
- Genus: Plinthanthesis; Steud.

Type species
- Plinthanthesis urvillei Steud.

Synonyms
- Blakeochloa Veldkamp

Genus of grasses

Plinthanthesis is a genus of Australian plants in the grass family.

Species

- Plinthanthesis paradoxa (R.Br.) S.T.Blake - New South Wales, Victoria
- Plinthanthesis rodwayi (C.E.Hubb.) S.T.Blake - New South Wales
- Plinthanthesis urvillei Steud. - New South Wales

formerly included

see Rytidosperma

- Plinthanthesis tenuior - Rytidosperma tenuius
