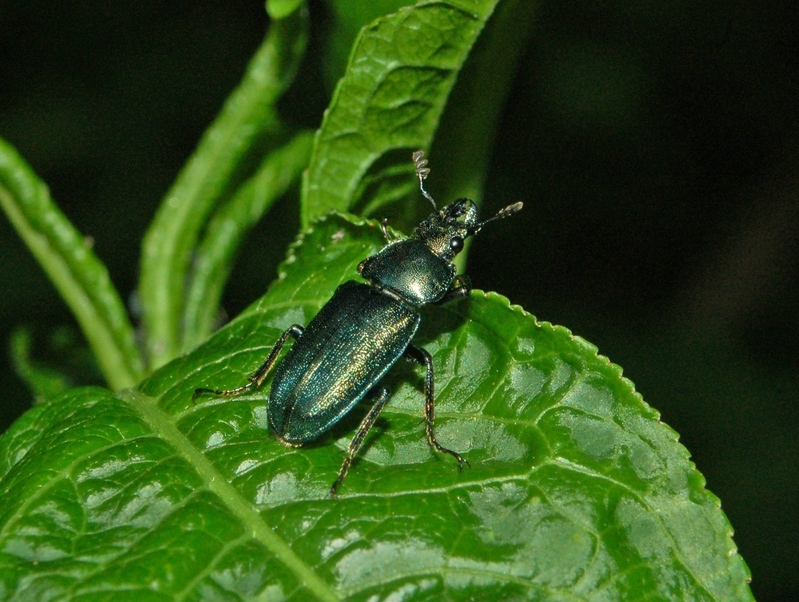
- Platycerus caraboides

Scientific classification
- Kingdom: Animalia
- Phylum: Arthropoda
- Class: Insecta
- Order: Coleoptera
- Suborder: Polyphaga
- Infraorder: Scarabaeiformia
- Family: Lucanidae
- Subfamily: Lucaninae
- Genus: Platycerus; Geoffroy, 1762

Synonyms
- Systenocerus Weise, 1883; Systenus Sharp & Muir, 1912 nec Loew, 1857

= Platycerus =

Genus of beetles

Platycerus is a genus of stag beetles (Lucanidae), belonging to the subfamily Lucaninae.

== Species ==
- Platycerus caprea (De Geer, 1774)
- Platycerus caraboides (Linnaeus, 1758)
- Platycerus caucasicus Parry, 1864
- Platycerus cribripennis Van Dyke, 1928
- Platycerus delagrangei Fairmaire, 1892
- Platycerus depressus LeConte, 1850
- Platycerus hongwonpyoi Imura & Choe, 1989
- Platycerus marginalis Casey, 1897
- Platycerus oregonensis Westwood, 1844
- Platycerus primigenius E. Weise, 1960
- Platycerus pseudocaprea Paulus, 1970
- Platycerus spinifer Schaufuss, 1862
- Platycerus quercus (Weber)
