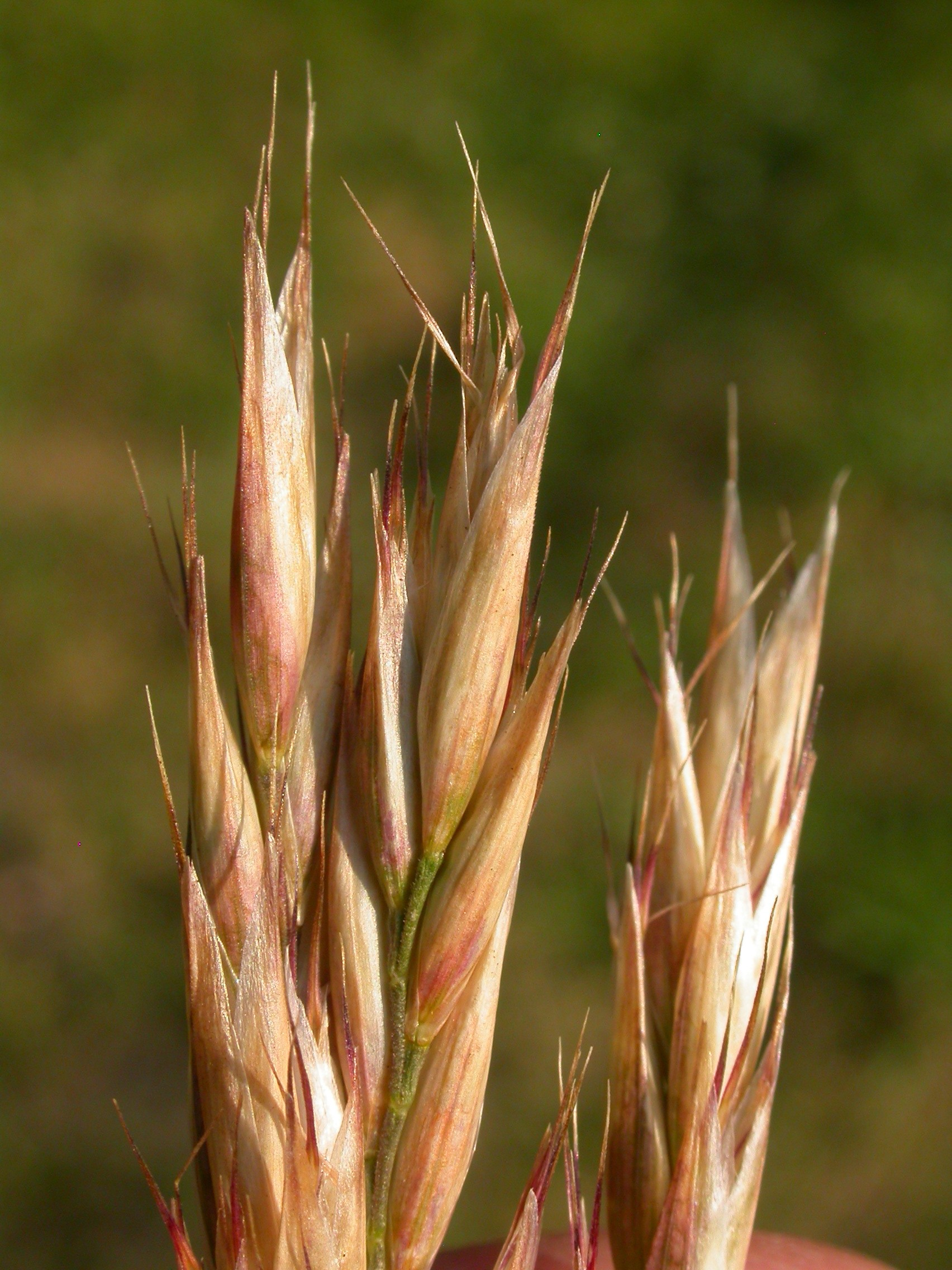

Scientific classification
- Kingdom: Plantae
- Clade: Tracheophytes
- Clade: Angiosperms
- Clade: Monocots
- Clade: Commelinids
- Order: Poales
- Family: Poaceae
- Genus: Danthonia
- Species: D. intermedia

Binomial name
- Danthonia intermedia Vasey

Synonyms
- Danthonia canadensis

= Danthonia intermedia =

Species of grass

Danthonia intermedia is a species of grass known by the common names timber oatgrass, intermediate oatgrass, and mountain wild-oat grass. This clumping erect perennial grass is native to North America, where it is widespread across most of Canada and along the western United States into California. It is a plant of the plains as well as forested, mountainous, alpine environments.

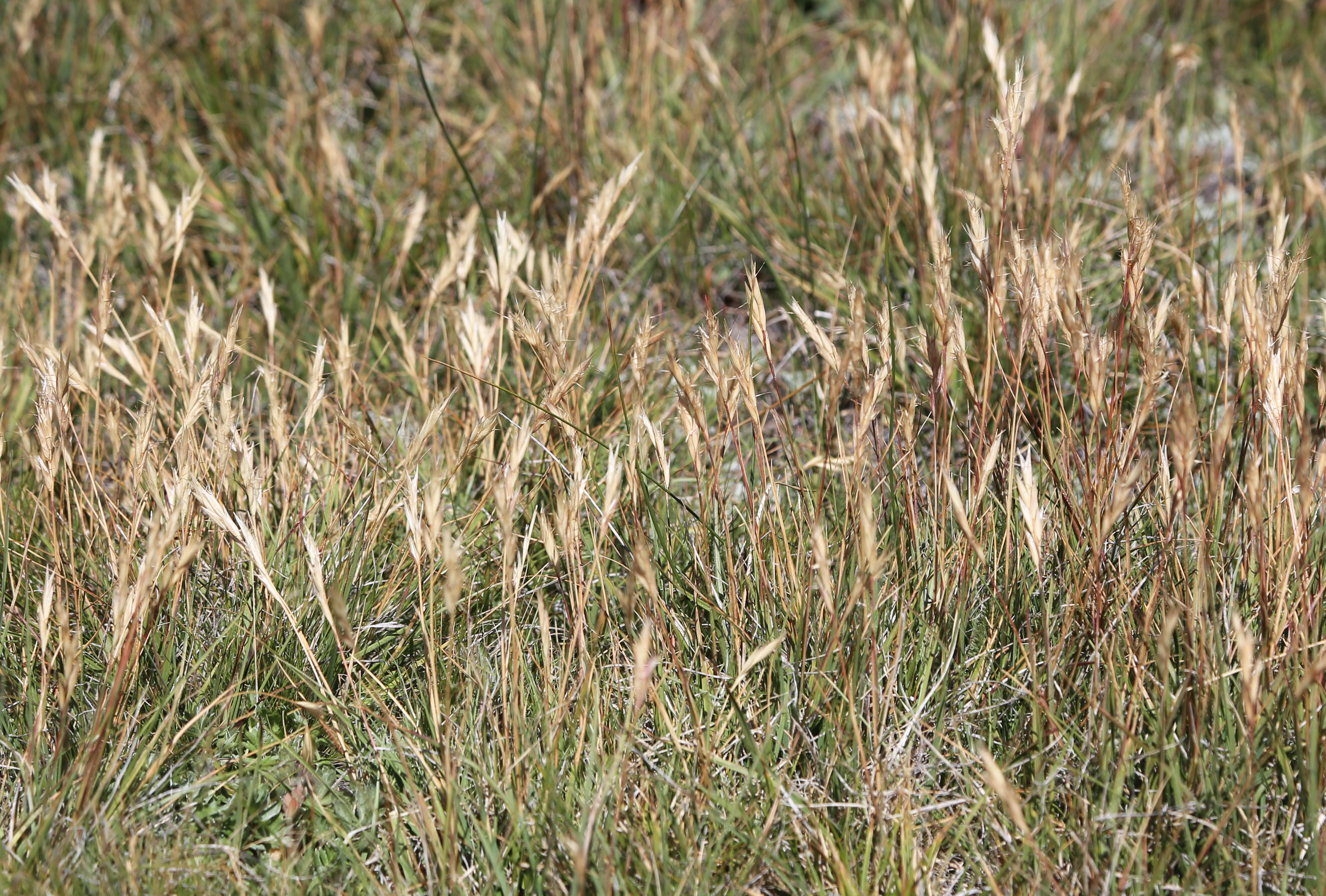
Danthonia intermedia in mountain meadow at 10,000 ft (3,000 m)

The bunchgrass reaches about half a meter in height at maximum. Its leaves are short and mostly basal. Each inflorescence is a narrow cluster of up to about ten spikelets, each spikelet holding 3 to 6 florets. The flowers are cleistogamous, meaning they remain closed and pollinate themselves. This grass also sometimes undergoes apomixis, reproduction without fertilization. This independence of the need for pollination between individuals is one reason why this grass is so widespread and able to tolerate a variety of climates.

This is a desirable grass for grazing land because it begins growing earlier in the spring than most other grasses, and it tolerates heavy grazing better than some other grasses because of its basal meristem, that is, new growth occurs low on the grass instead of on the tip where it can be chewed off. This grass is an indicator of ecological climax in many ecosystems.
