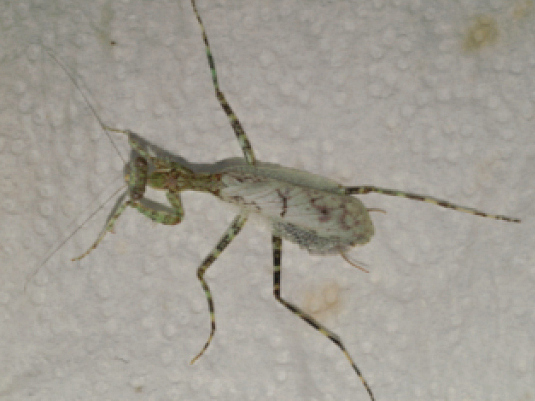
- Dactylopteryx flexuosa

Scientific classification
- Kingdom: Animalia
- Phylum: Arthropoda
- Clade: Pancrustacea
- Class: Insecta
- Order: Mantodea
- Clade: Mantidea
- Superfamily: Mantoidea
- Family: Dactylopterygidae; Giglio-Tos, 1915

= Dactylopterygidae =

Family of praying mantises

Dactylopterygidae is a family of praying mantises, based on the type genus Dactylopteryx. The first use of "Dactylopterygidae" was by Giglio-Tos and it has recently (2019) been revived as part of a major revision of mantis taxonomy; three genera have been separated from others in the subfamily Liturgusinae (mostly from Asia) and moved here from the family Liturgusidae.

The new placement is in the superfamily Mantoidea (of group Cernomantodea) and infraorder Schizomantodea. Species in this family have been recorded from Tropical Africa.

== Genera ==
The Mantodea Species File lists:

- Dactylopteryx Karsch, 1892
- Theopompella Giglio-Tos, 1917
- Zouza Rehn, 1911
