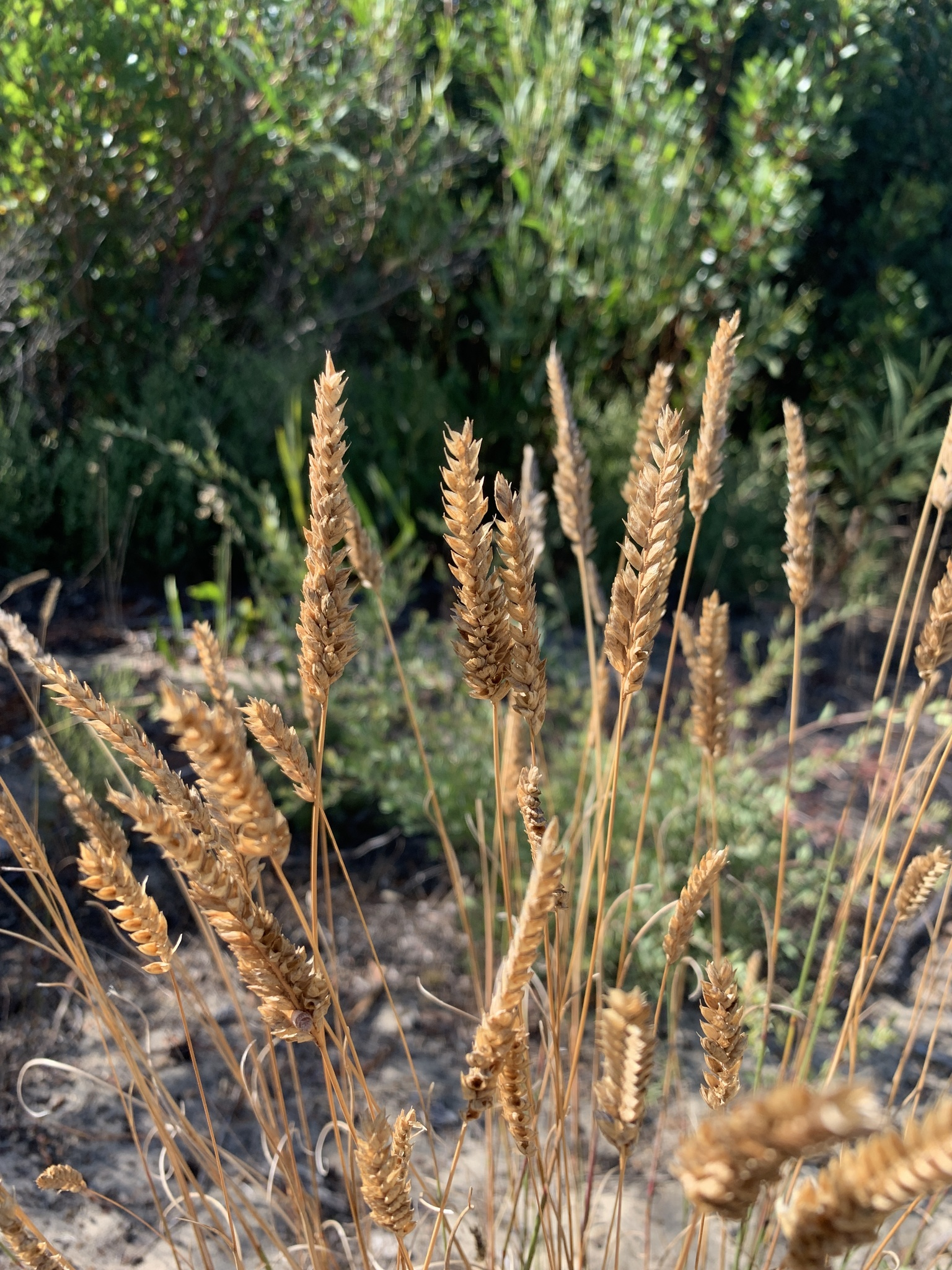
- Tribolium uniolae

Scientific classification
- Kingdom: Plantae
- Clade: Tracheophytes
- Clade: Angiosperms
- Clade: Monocots
- Clade: Commelinids
- Order: Poales
- Family: Poaceae
- Subfamily: Danthonioideae
- Tribe: Danthonieae
- Genus: Tribolium; Desv.

Type species
- Tribolium hispidum (Thunb.) Desv.

Synonyms
- Lasiochloa Kunth; Allagostachyum Nees; Urochlaena Nees; Plagiochloa Adamson & Sprague; Karroochloa Conert & Türpe

= Tribolium (plant) =

Genus of grasses

Tribolium is a genus of African plants in the grass family, native to South Africa and neighboring countries.

Species

- Tribolium acutiflorum
- Tribolium alternans
- Tribolium amplexum
- Tribolium angustifolium
- Tribolium brachystachyum
- Tribolium capensis
- Tribolium ciliare
- Tribolium curvum
- Tribolium echinatum
- Tribolium hispidum
- Tribolium obliterum
- Tribolium obtusifolium
- Tribolium pleuropogon
- Tribolium purpureum
- Tribolium pusillum
- Tribolium tenellum
- Tribolium uniolae
- Tribolium utriculosum
