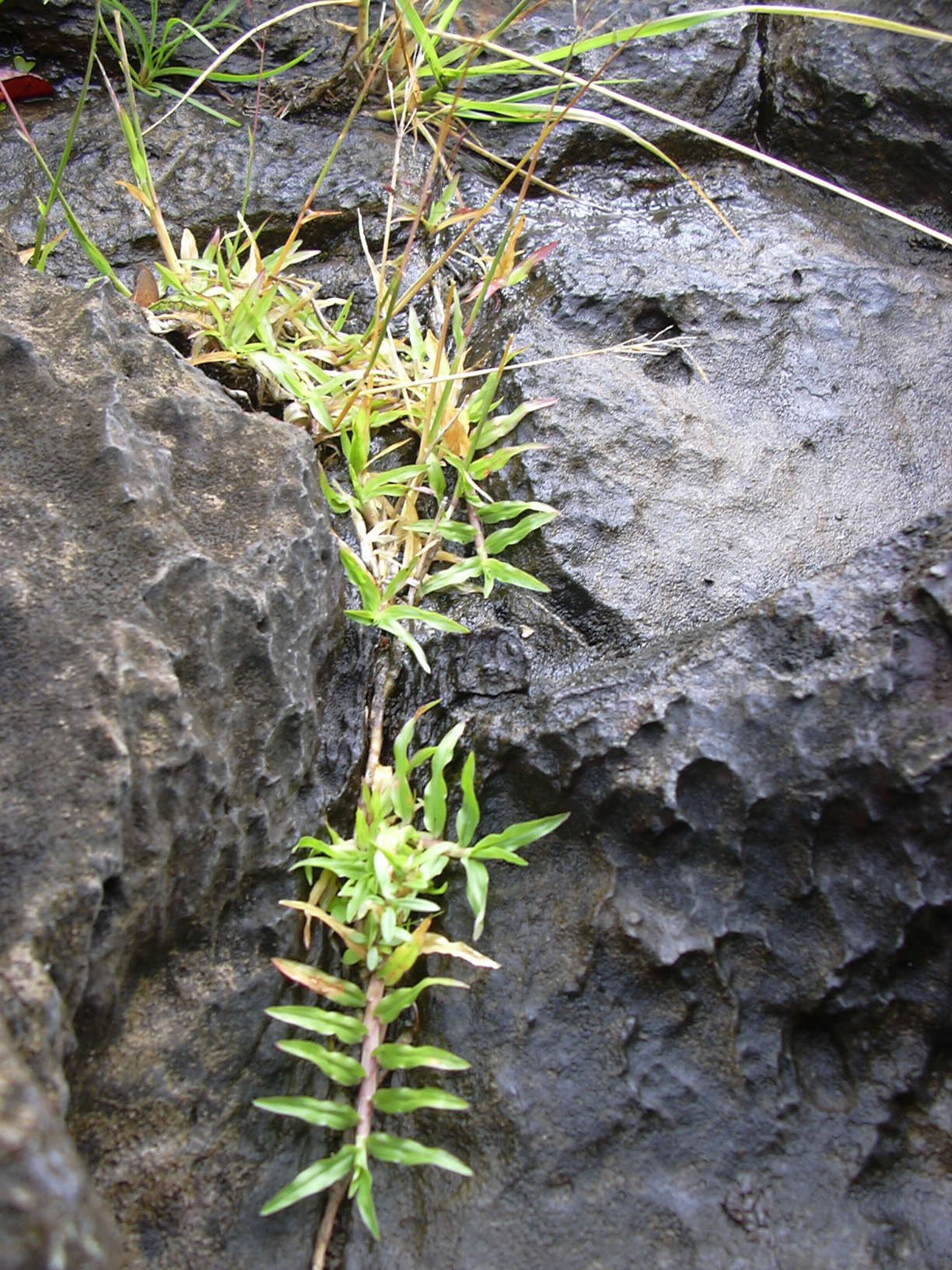
- Chrysopogon aciculatus

Scientific classification
- Kingdom: Plantae
- Clade: Tracheophytes
- Clade: Angiosperms
- Clade: Monocots
- Clade: Commelinids
- Order: Poales
- Family: Poaceae
- Subfamily: Panicoideae
- Subtribe: Saccharainae
- Tribe: Andropogoneae
- Genus: Chrysopogon; Trin.

Synonyms
- Phoenix Haller 1768, illegitimate homonym not L. 1753 (Arecaceae); Rhaphis Lour. 1790, rejected name not Walp. 1852. (Arecaceae); Pollinia Spreng., rejected name; Centrophorum Trin.; Vetiveria Bory ex Lem.; Mandelorna Steud.

= Chrysopogon =

Genus of grasses

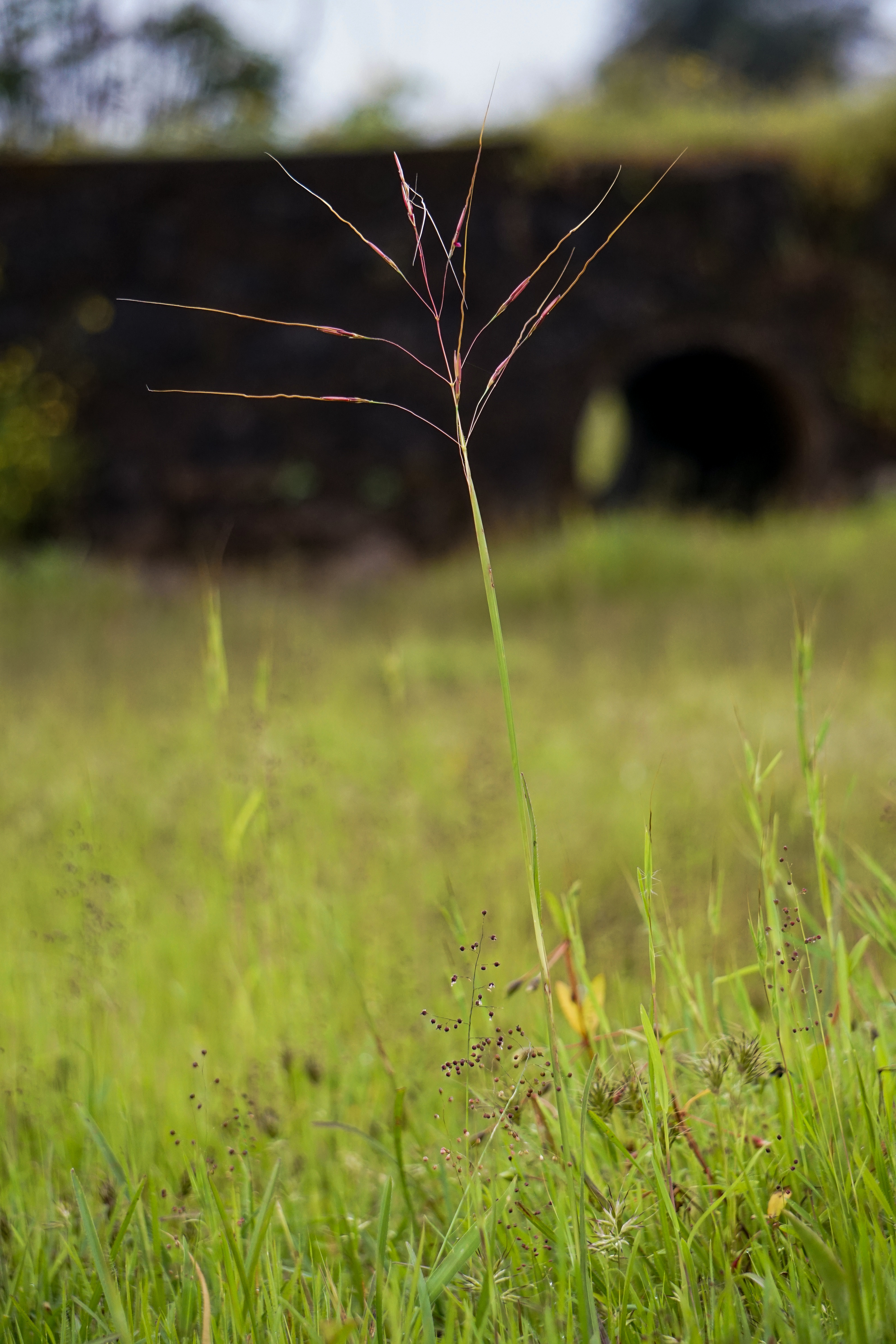
Chrysopogon castaneus Veldkamp & C. B. Salunkhe

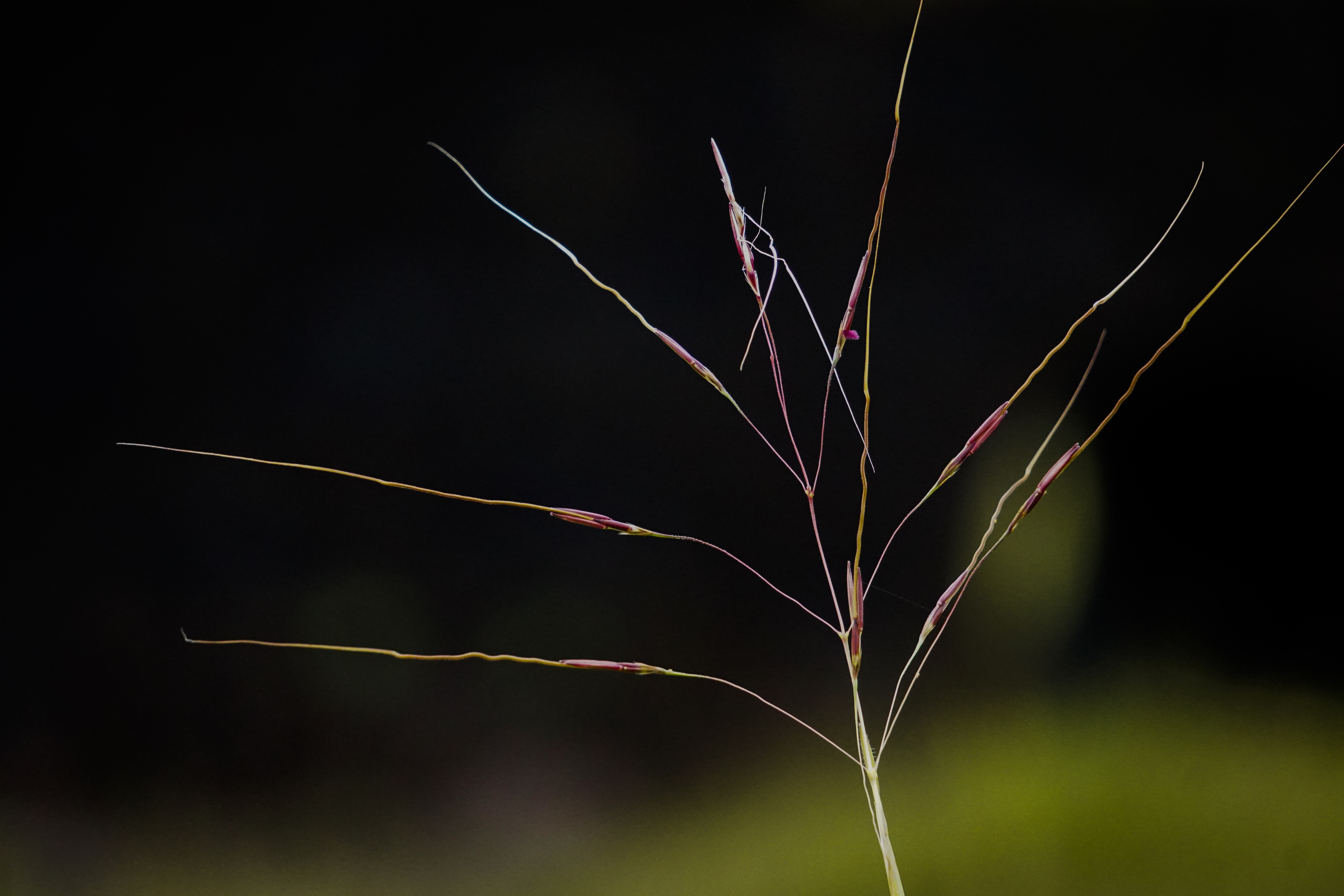
Chrysopogon castaneus Veldkamp & C. B. Salunkhe, inflorescence.

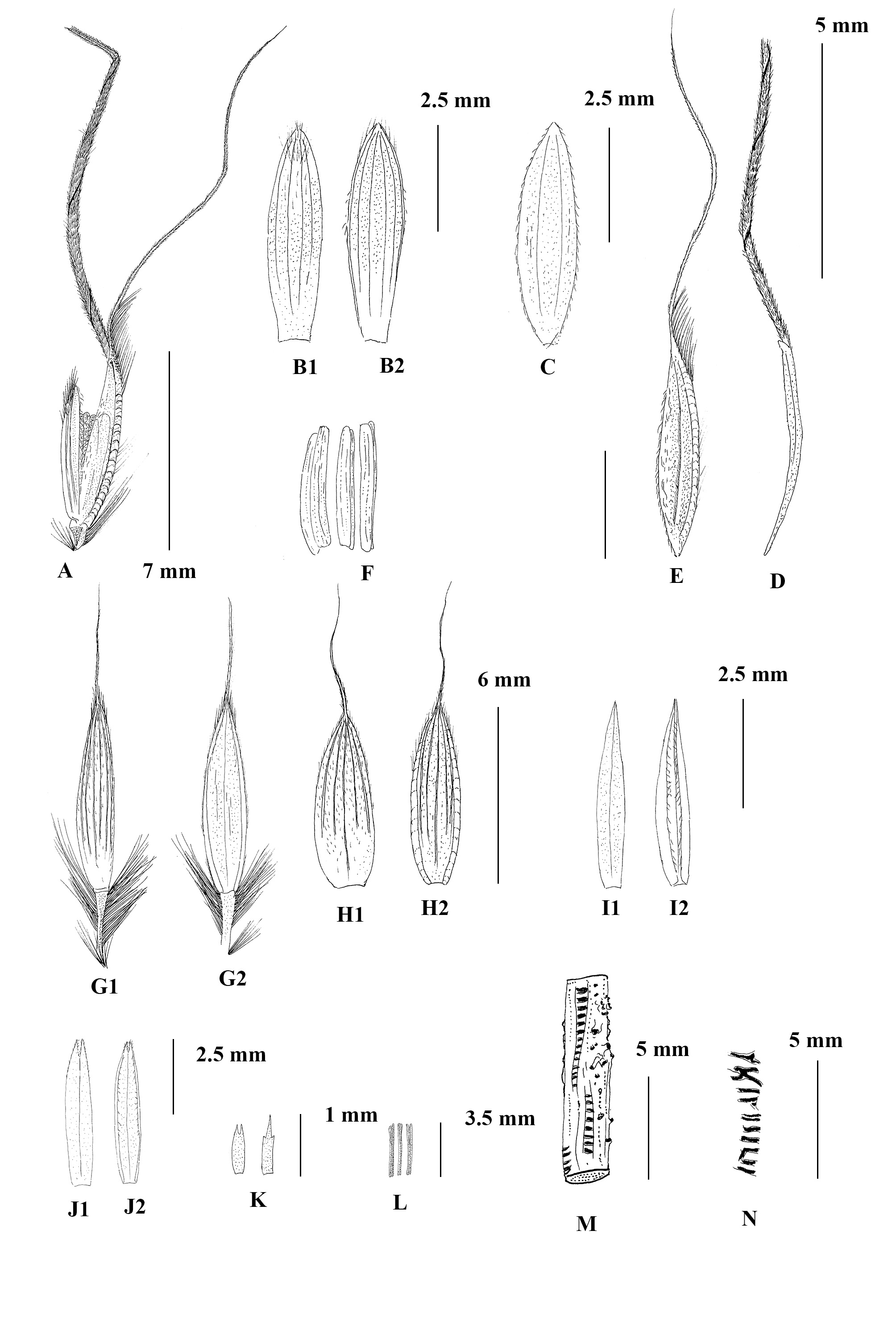
Chrysopogon densipaniculatus Landge & A. P. Tiwari, illustration.

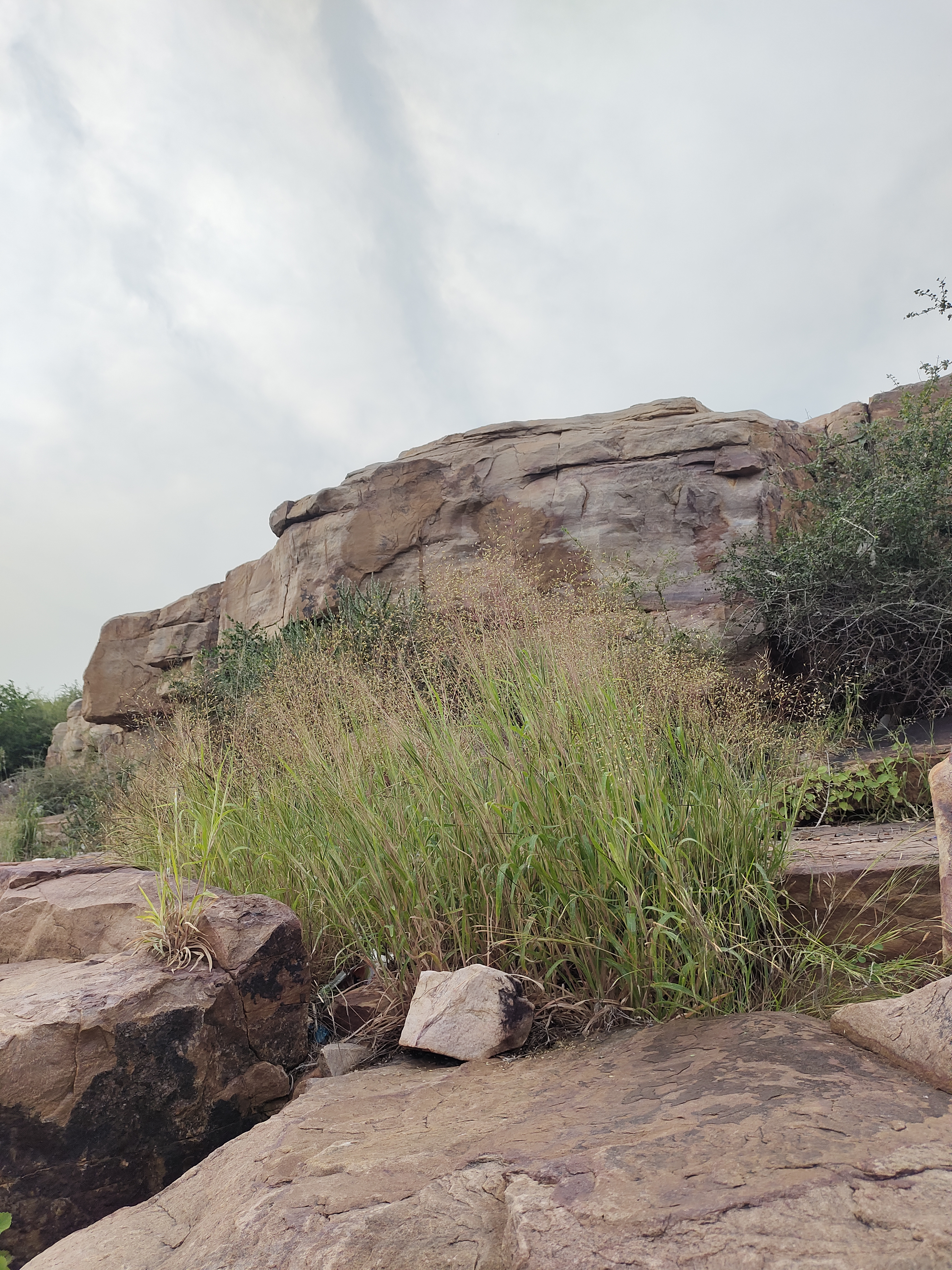
Chrysopogon velutinus (Hook.f.) Bor

Chrysopogon is a genus of tropical and subtropical plants in the grass family. They are widespread across Eurasia, Africa, Australia, southeastern North America, and various islands.

== Species ==
- Chrysopogon aciculatus - east + south + southeast Asia, Queensland, various islands in Pacific + Indian Oceans
- Chrysopogon argutus - Madagascar, Mauritius, Rodrigues I
- Chrysopogon asper - Tamil Nadu
- Chrysopogon aucheri - Algeria, Morocco, Ethiopia, Socotra, Somalia; Asia from Yemen to Kashmir
- Chrysopogon borneensis - Kalimantan Timur
- Chrysopogon castaneus - Maharashtra
- Chrysopogon celebicus - Sulawesi
- Chrysopogon copei - Tamil Nadu
- Chrysopogon crevostii - Cambodia, Vietnam
- Chrysopogon densipaniculatus - Chhattisgarh, India
- Chrysopogon elongatus - New Guinea, Queensland, Northern Territory
- Chrysopogon fallax - Australia
- Chrysopogon festucoides - India, southeast Asia
- Chrysopogon filipes - New Guinea, Australia
- Chrysopogon fulvibarbis - West Africa
- Chrysopogon fulvus - Indian Subcon, Indochina, Pen Malaysia
- Chrysopogon gryllus - Eurasia from France to Thailand
- Chrysopogon hackelii - Tamil Nadu
- Chrysopogon hamiltonii - Bihar
- Chrysopogon humbertianus - Madagascar
- Chrysopogon intercedens - Papua New Guinea
- Chrysopogon lancearius - Bangladesh, Sikkim, Bhutan
- Chrysopogon latifolius - Northern Territory, Western Australia
- Chrysopogon lawsonii - India, Nepal, Thailand, Vietnam
- Chrysopogon macleishii - Oman
- Chrysopogon micrantherus - Papua New Guinea
- Chrysopogon nemoralis - Panay, Vietnam, Pen Malaysia
- Chrysopogon nigritanus - Africa
- Chrysopogon nodulibarbis - Indian Subcon, Indochina
- Chrysopogon oliganthus - Australia
- Chrysopogon orientalis - Indian Subcon, S China, SE Asia
- Chrysopogon pallidus - Australia
- Chrysopogon pauciflorus - Texas, North Carolina, Florida, Cuba
- Chrysopogon perlaxus - Thailand
- Chrysopogon plumulosus - Africa, Arabia
- Chrysopogon polyphyllus - India, Myanmar
- Chrysopogon pseudozeylanicus - India
- Chrysopogon purushothamanii - Kerala
- Chrysopogon rigidus - Queensland
- Chrysopogon schmidianus - Laos, Vietnam
- Chrysopogon serrulatus - Africa, Madagascar, S + SE Asia
- Chrysopogon setifolius - Australia
- Chrysopogon subtilis - Philippines, Java, Bali
- Chrysopogon sylvaticus - Australia
- Chrysopogon tadulingamii - India
- Chrysopogon tenuiculmis - Lesser Sunda Is
- Chrysopogon velutinus - Karnataka
- Chrysopogon verticillatus - India
- Chrysopogon zizanioides - Southeast Asia

== Formerly included ==
- Chrysopogon alternans - Capillipedium parviflorum
- Chrysopogon avenaceus - Sorghastrum nutans
- Chrysopogon distachyos - Andropogon distachyos
- Chrysopogon elliottii - Sorghastrum elliottii
- Chrysopogon filiformis - Dimeria ornithopoda
- Chrysopogon francavilleanus - Sorghastrum setosum
- Chrysopogon glaucopsis - Capillipedium assimile
- Chrysopogon leucotrichus - Capillipedium leucotrichum
- Chrysopogon minarum - Sorghastrum minarum
- Chrysopogon minor - Sorghastrum nutans
- Chrysopogon muricatus - Garnotia elata
- Chrysopogon nutans - Sorghastrum nutans
- Chrysopogon parviflorus - Capillipedium parviflorum
- Chrysopogon parvispicus - Capillipedium parviflorum
- Chrysopogon pictus - Capillipedium assimile
- Chrysopogon secundus - Sorghastrum secundum
- Chrysopogon stipoides Trin. 1836 - Sorghastrum minarum
- Chrysopogon stipoides (Kunth) Benth. 1881 - Sorghastrum stipoides
- Chrysopogon stipoideus - Sorghum stipoideum
- Chrysopogon strictus - Bothriochloa bladhii
- Chrysopogon subrepens - Capillipedium assimile
- Chrysopogon tener - Asthenochloa tenera
- Chrysopogon villosulis - Capillipedium parviflorum
- Chrysopogon villosulus - Capillipedium parviflorum
- Chrysopogon violascens - Capillipedium parviflorum

== Research ==
In 2022, a new species Chrysopogon densipaniculatus was added to the genus. It is peculiar in that it bears glands on the peduncle, and palea in the pedicelled spikelets are reduced tridentate scale. This species is so far only known from Chhattisgarh, India.
