= Fitchiella robertsonii =

Scientific classification
- Kingdom: Animalia
- Phylum: Arthropoda
- Class: Insecta
- Order: Hemiptera
- Suborder: Auchenorrhyncha
- Infraorder: Fulgoromorpha
- Family: Caliscelidae
- Genus: Fitchiella
- Species: F. robertsonii

Binomial name
- Fitchiella robertsonii (Fitch 1856)

Synonyms
- Naso robertsonii

Species of plant-hopper

Fitchiella robertsonii is a species of planthopper found in Canada and the United States. It feeds on Sorghastrum nutans as its primary host plant, although the species can also survive on Andropogon gerardi.
