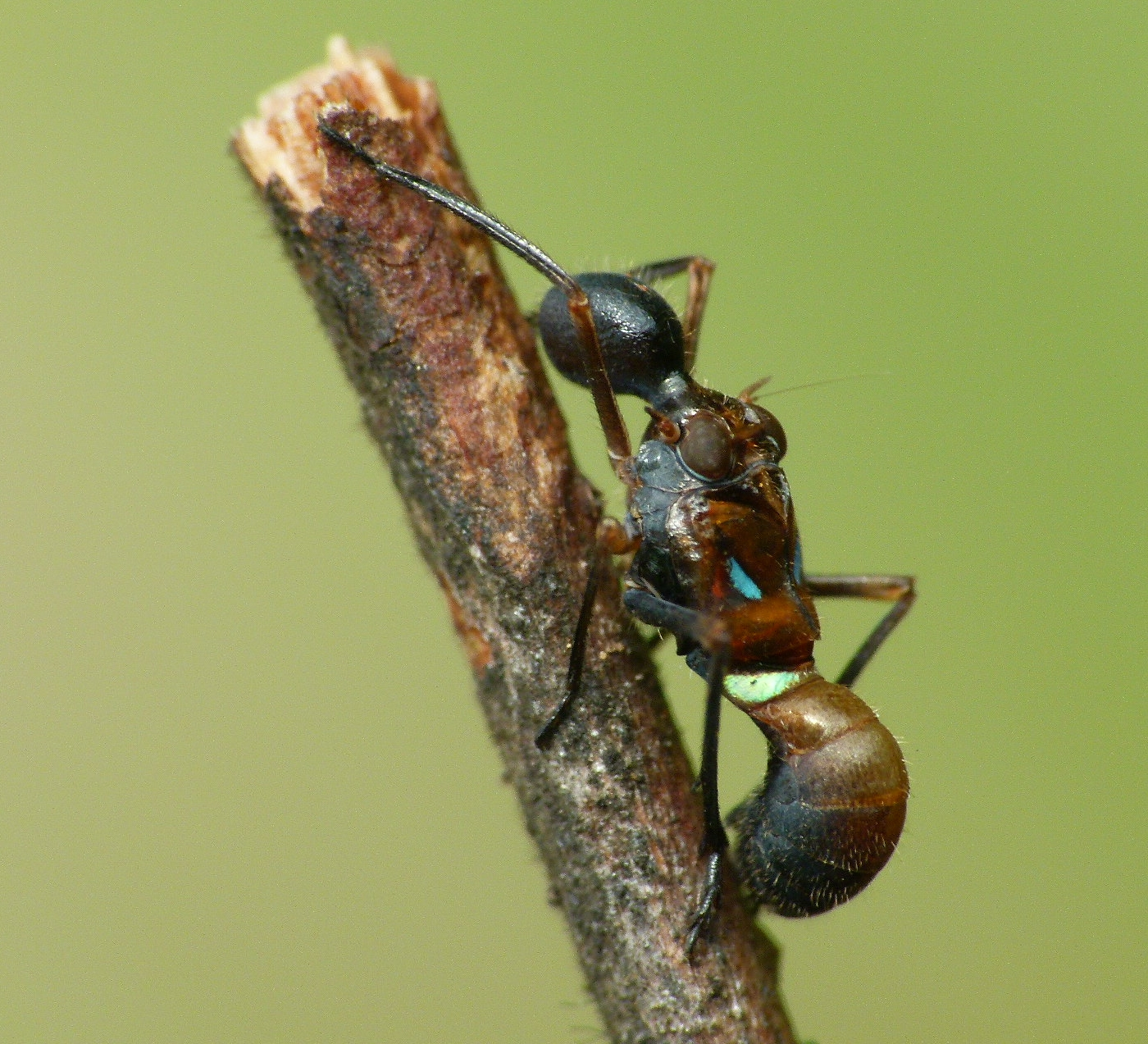
- Male climbing a twig

Scientific classification
- Kingdom: Animalia
- Phylum: Arthropoda
- Class: Insecta
- Order: Hemiptera
- Suborder: Auchenorrhyncha
- Infraorder: Fulgoromorpha
- Family: Caliscelidae
- Genus: Formiscurra
- Species: F. indicus

Binomial name
- Formiscurra indicus Gnezdilov & Viraktamath, 2011

= Formiscurra indicus =

Species of true bug

Formiscurra indicus is a species of planthopper in the family Caliscelidae found in southern India. A related species, Formiscurra atlas occurs in southwestern Ethiopia. Like others of its family they have short wings, suck plant sap and escape by leaping. The species shows great sexual dimorphism. The male of this half centimeter-long insect has an enlarged lobe in front of its head, the frons or metope, giving it an ant-like appearance. Females do not have such an enlarged structure but have a slightly long snout and differ slightly in body shape. The species is found mainly on low vegetation in open scrub and grass habitats.

== Discovery ==
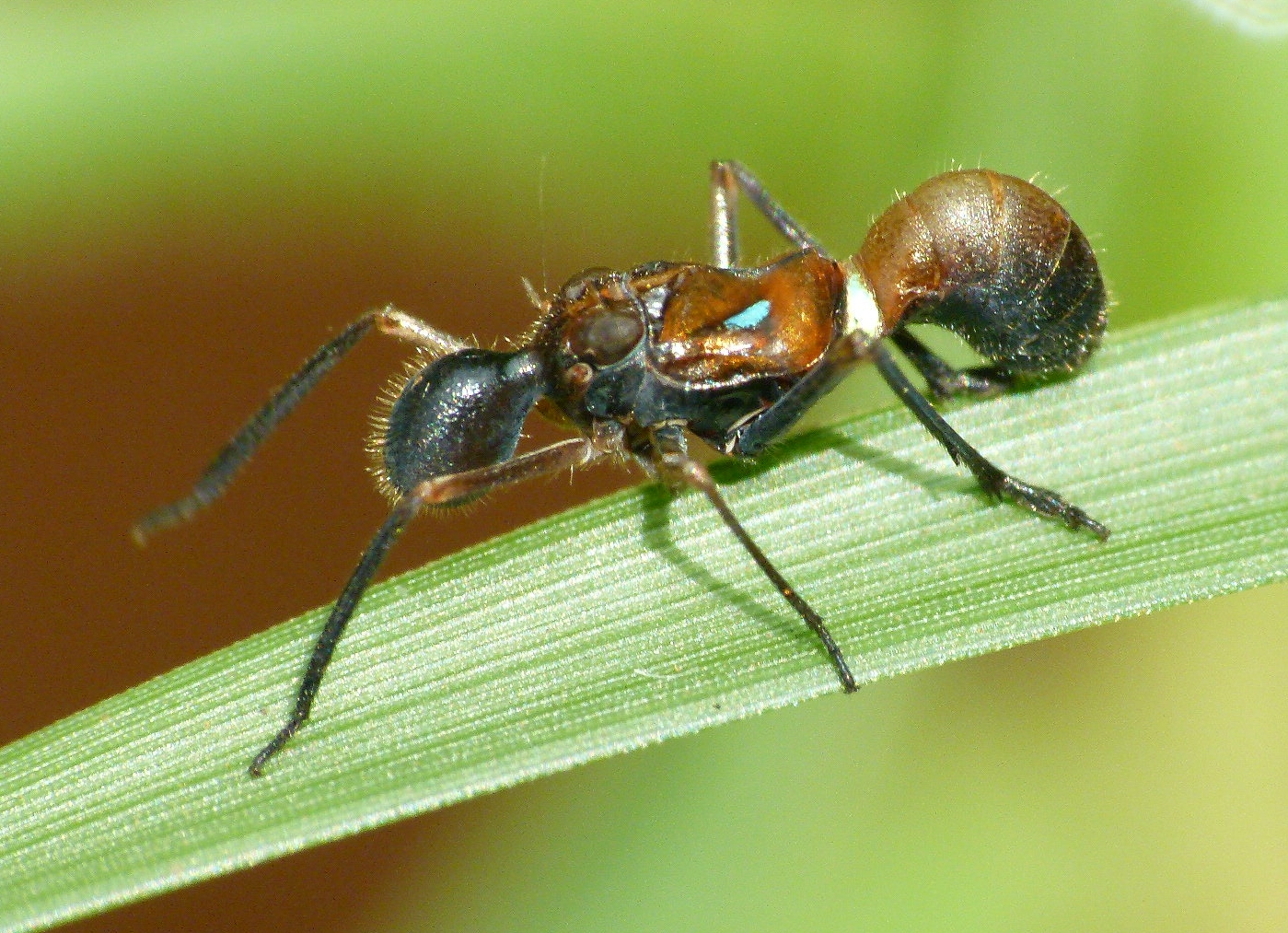
Male on a blade of grass, Bangalore, India

This species was described in 2011 on the basis of specimens collected from around southern India from as far back as 1978. The holotype was collected in the campus of the University of Agricultural Sciences at Bangalore in the state of Karnataka in India. Other specimens have been collected from a widely separated locations in southern India including Nagerhole, Dindigul, Mettupalayam and in Andhra Pradesh. The genus name is derived from the Latin word formica for ant and scurra for clown. Although no molecular phylogenetic studies have been conducted, the species is thought to be closely related to African forms like Afronaso and Populonia. Not much is known about the life history of the species and although the males are myrmecomorphic, the benefit of this ant-mimicry being limited to the male is not clearly understood. Male-limited Batesian mimicry is extremely rare. and in general, male-limited mimicry is rare (the other examples being a spider Coleosoma floridanum with an ant-like male and a jewel beetle Chrysobothris with males being mimetic).

== Description ==
The male of Formiscurra indicus is about 5 mm long. The legs are long and the forelegs are sometimes raised when walking. The body is somewhat saddle shaped and the abdomen is slightly narrow at the base. The male has the frons (lower part of metope and upper part of post-clypeus) elongated and bulbous. The antenna has a long filament arising upward from the pedicel. The compound eyes are large and there are no ocelli. The short beak or rostrum is held underneath the body and the tip reaches the base of the hindleg. The female has a short tubular snout without the bulbous shape. The female lacks the narrowed waist and has the abdomen shaped as in more typical caliscelids.
