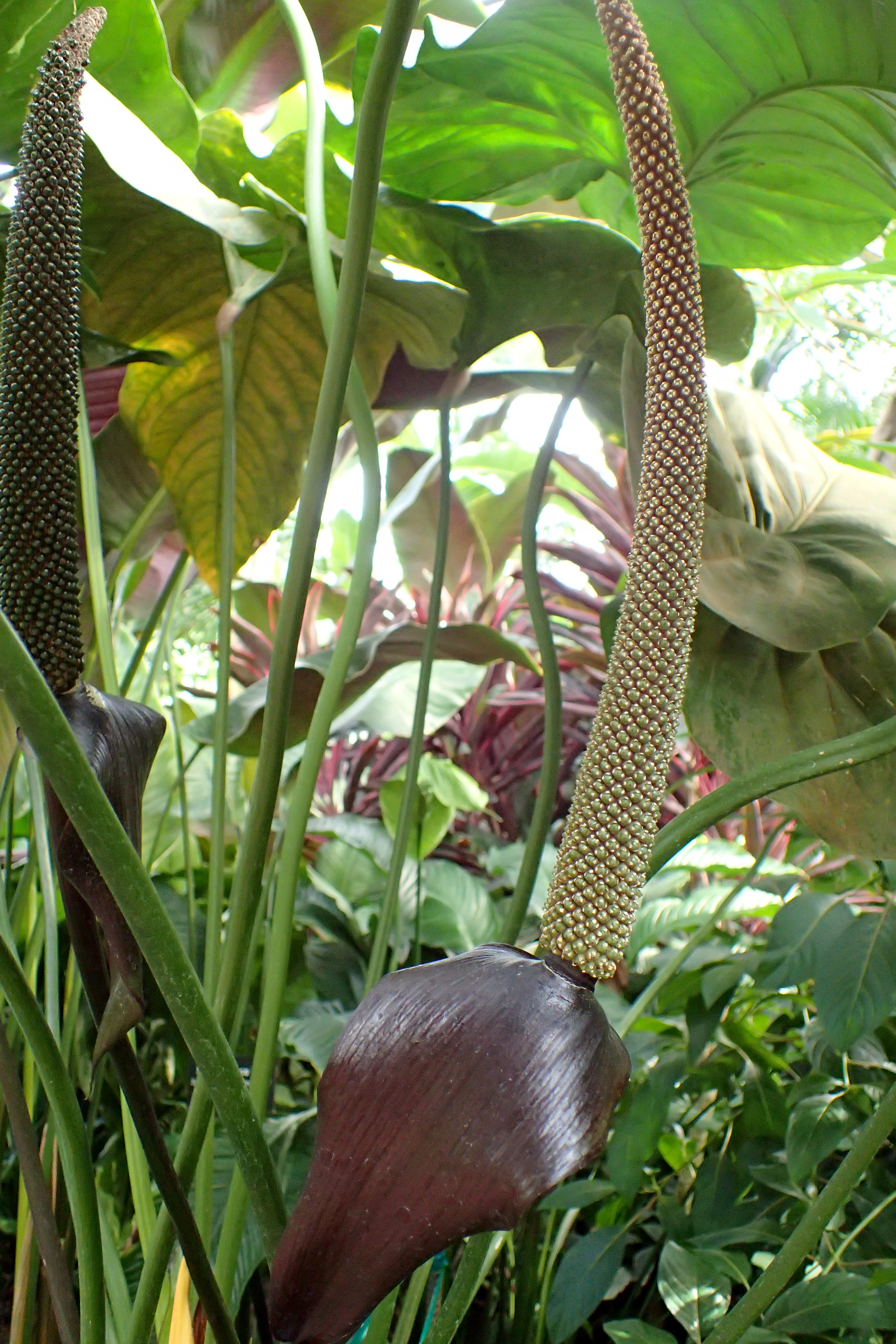
- Inflorescences
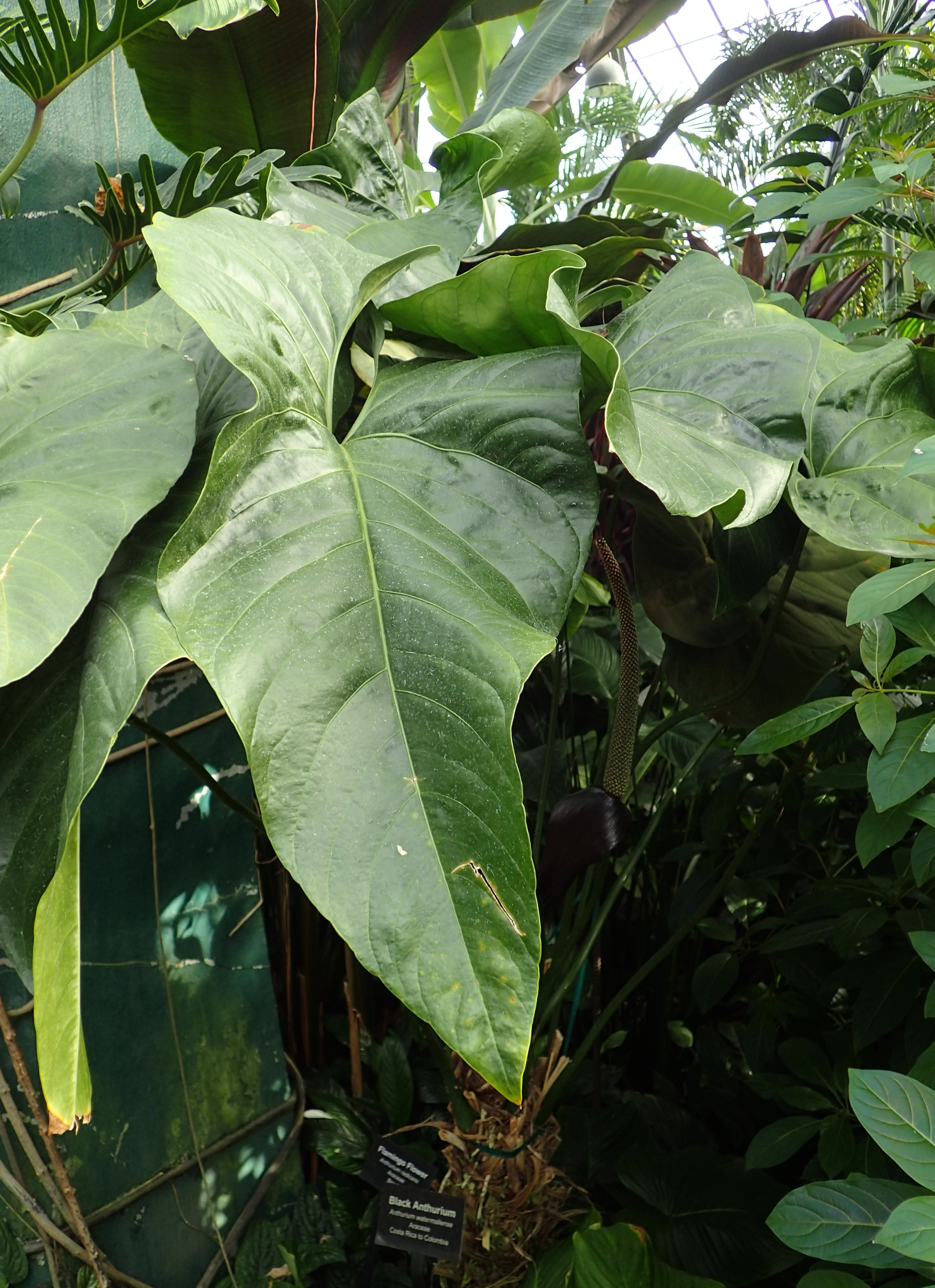
- Leaves are typically 60 cm (24 in) long and 40 cm (16 in) wide.

Scientific classification
- Kingdom: Plantae
- Clade: Embryophytes
- Clade: Tracheophytes
- Clade: Angiosperms
- Clade: Monocots
- Order: Alismatales
- Family: Araceae
- Genus: Anthurium
- Species: A. watermaliense

Binomial name
- Anthurium watermaliense L.H.Bailey & Nash

= Anthurium watermaliense =

Species of flowering plant

Anthurium watermaliense, the black anthurium or black prince, is a species of flowering plant in the family Araceae, native to Costa Rica, Panama, and Colombia. Its dark purple spathes make it popular as a houseplant.
