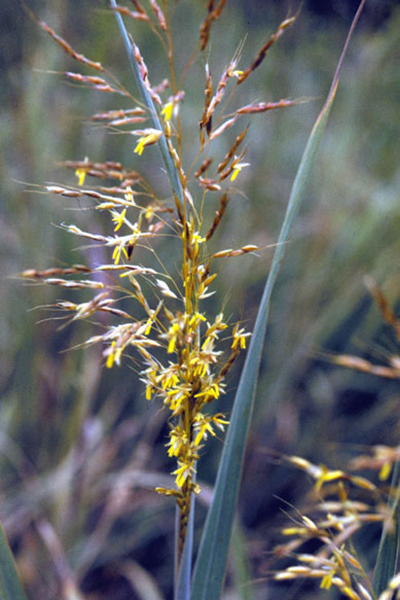
- Sorghastrum nutans

Scientific classification
- Kingdom: Plantae
- Clade: Tracheophytes
- Clade: Angiosperms
- Clade: Monocots
- Clade: Commelinids
- Order: Poales
- Family: Poaceae
- Subfamily: Panicoideae
- Supertribe: Andropogonodae
- Tribe: Andropogoneae
- Subtribe: Saccharinae
- Genus: Sorghastrum; Nash

Type species
- Sorghastrum avenaceum (Michx.) Nash.

Synonyms
- Chalcoelytrum Lunell; Dipogon Steud. 1840, rejected name not Liebm. 1854; Poranthera Raf. 1830, illegitimate homonym not Rudge 1811 (Phyllanthaceae); Sorghum sect. Sorghastrum (Nash) Stapf; Sorghum subg. Sorghastrum (Nash) E.D. Garber

= Sorghastrum =

Indiangrass

Genus of grasses

Sorghastrum is a genus of grasses, native to Africa and the Americas.

Members of the genus are commonly known as Indiangrass.

Selected

- Sorghastrum balansae (Hack.) Dávila - Paraguay
- Sorghastrum brunneum Swallen - Mexico, Guatemala, Honduras
- Sorghastrum chaseae Swallen - Mato Grosso, Paraíba
- Sorghastrum contractum (Hack.) M.Kuhlm. & Kuhn - Brazil
- Sorghastrum crassum Renvoize - Bolivia
- Sorghastrum elliottii (C.Mohr) Nash – Slender Indiangrass - southeastern + south-central USA (Texas to Virginia)
- Sorghastrum fuscescens (Pilg.) Clayton - Tanzania, Zambia, Malawi
- Sorghastrum incompletum (J.Presl) Nash - Latin America from Mexico to Bolivia; Africa from Senegal to Zimbabwe
- Sorghastrum minarum (Nees) Hitchc. - Bolivia, Brazil, Paraguay, Argentina
- Sorghastrum nudipes Nash - Chihuahua, Durango, Sonora, Limpopo, Botswana, Namibia, Zimbabwe, Zambia, Mozambique, Malawi, Angola
- Sorghastrum nutans (L.) Nash – Yellow Indiangrass - Canada, USA, Mexico, Honduras
- Sorghastrum pellitum (Hack.) Parodi - Paraguay, Brazil, Argentina, Uruguay
- Sorghastrum pogonostachyum (Stapf) Clayton - Tanzania, Angola, Zambia, Malawi
- Sorghastrum pohlianum Dávila, L.I.Cabrera & R.Lira - Socorro Island in Colima
- Sorghastrum scaberrimum (Nees) Herter - Brazil
- Sorghastrum secundum (Elliott) Nash – Lopsided Indiangrass - southeastern USA; Bahamas
- Sorghastrum setosum (Griseb.) Hitchc. – Sandysoil Indiangrass - Latin America + West Indies from Veracruz to Uruguay
- Sorghastrum stipoides (Kunth) Nash – Needle Indiangrass - tropical + southern Africa; naturalized in Latin America
- Sorghastrum tisserantii Clayton - Central African Rep
- Sorghastrum viride Swallen - Paraguay, Brazil, Argentina, Uruguay
