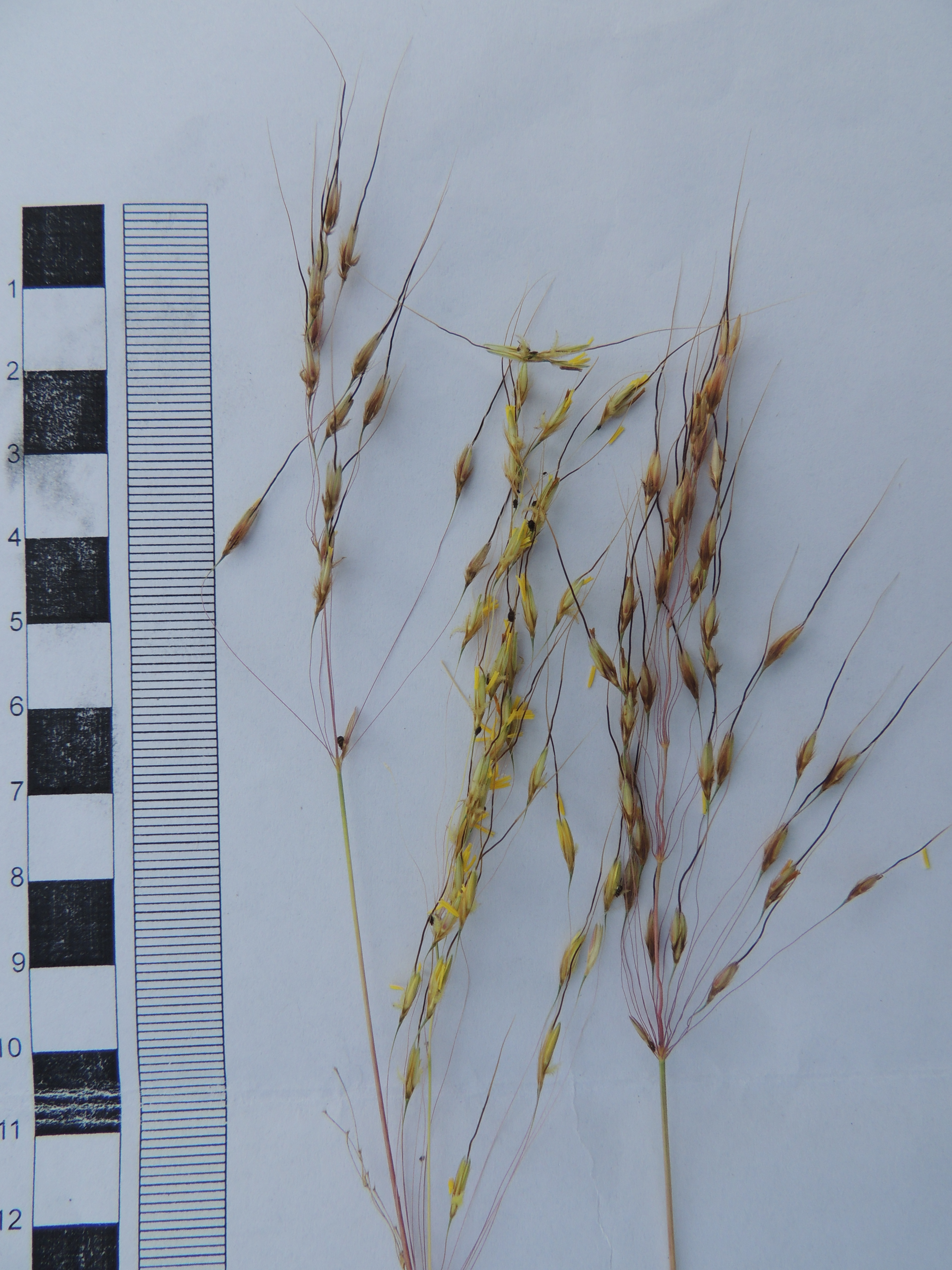
- Botanical specimen

Scientific classification
- Kingdom: Plantae
- Clade: Embryophytes
- Clade: Tracheophytes
- Clade: Angiosperms
- Clade: Monocots
- Clade: Commelinids
- Order: Poales
- Family: Poaceae
- Subfamily: Panicoideae
- Genus: Chrysopogon
- Species: C. fulvus

Binomial name
- Chrysopogon fulvus (Spreng.) Chiov.

Synonyms
- List: Andropogon montanus J.Koenig ex Trin.; Andropogon monticola Schult. & Schult.f.; Andropogon sprengelii Kunth; Chrysopogon montanus Trin.; Chrysopogon monticola (Schult. & Schult.f.) Haines; Pollinia fulva Spreng.; Sorghum monticola (Schult. & Schult.f.) Kuntze

= Chrysopogon fulvus =

Species of grass

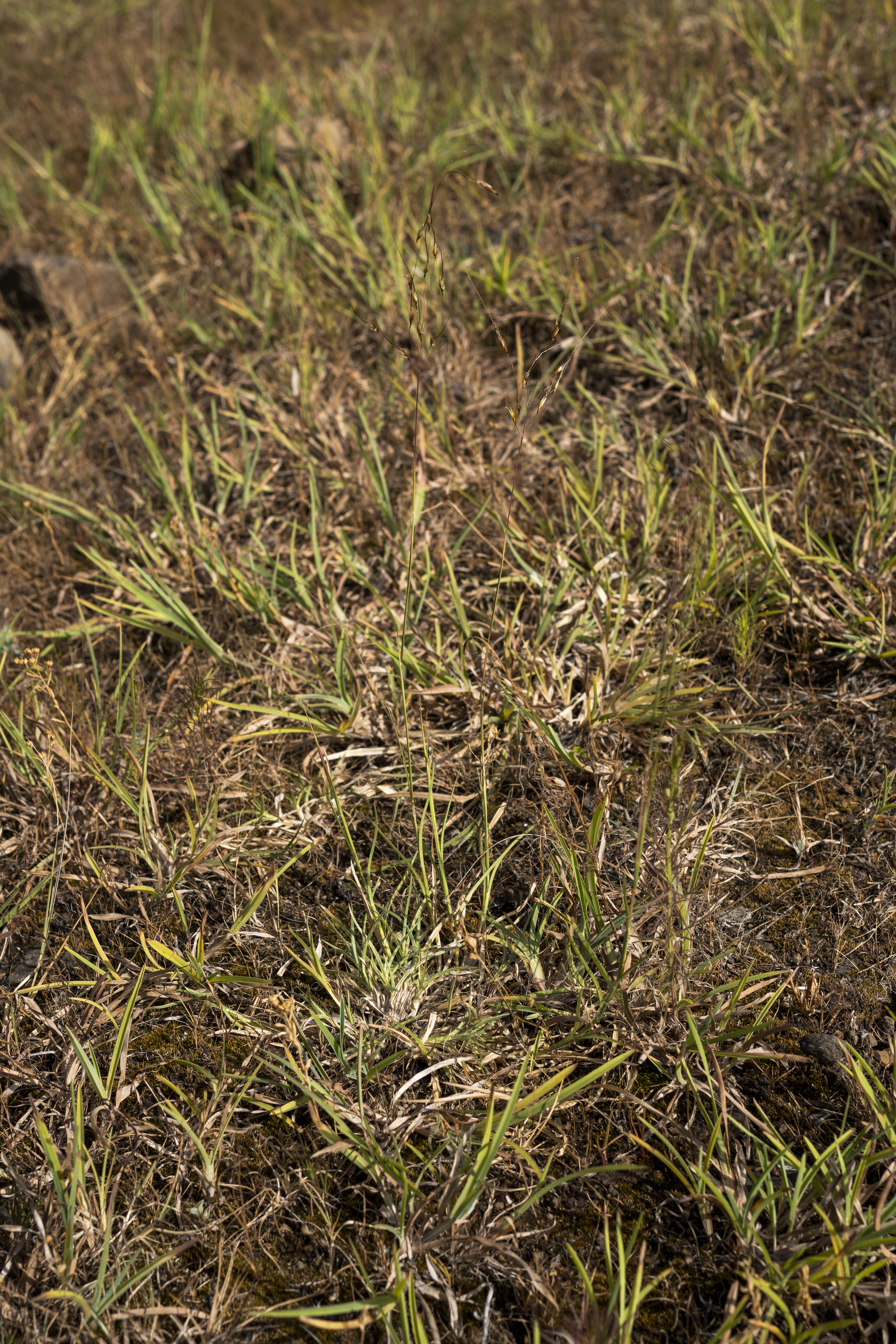
Chrysopogon fulvus (Spreng.) Chiov., habit

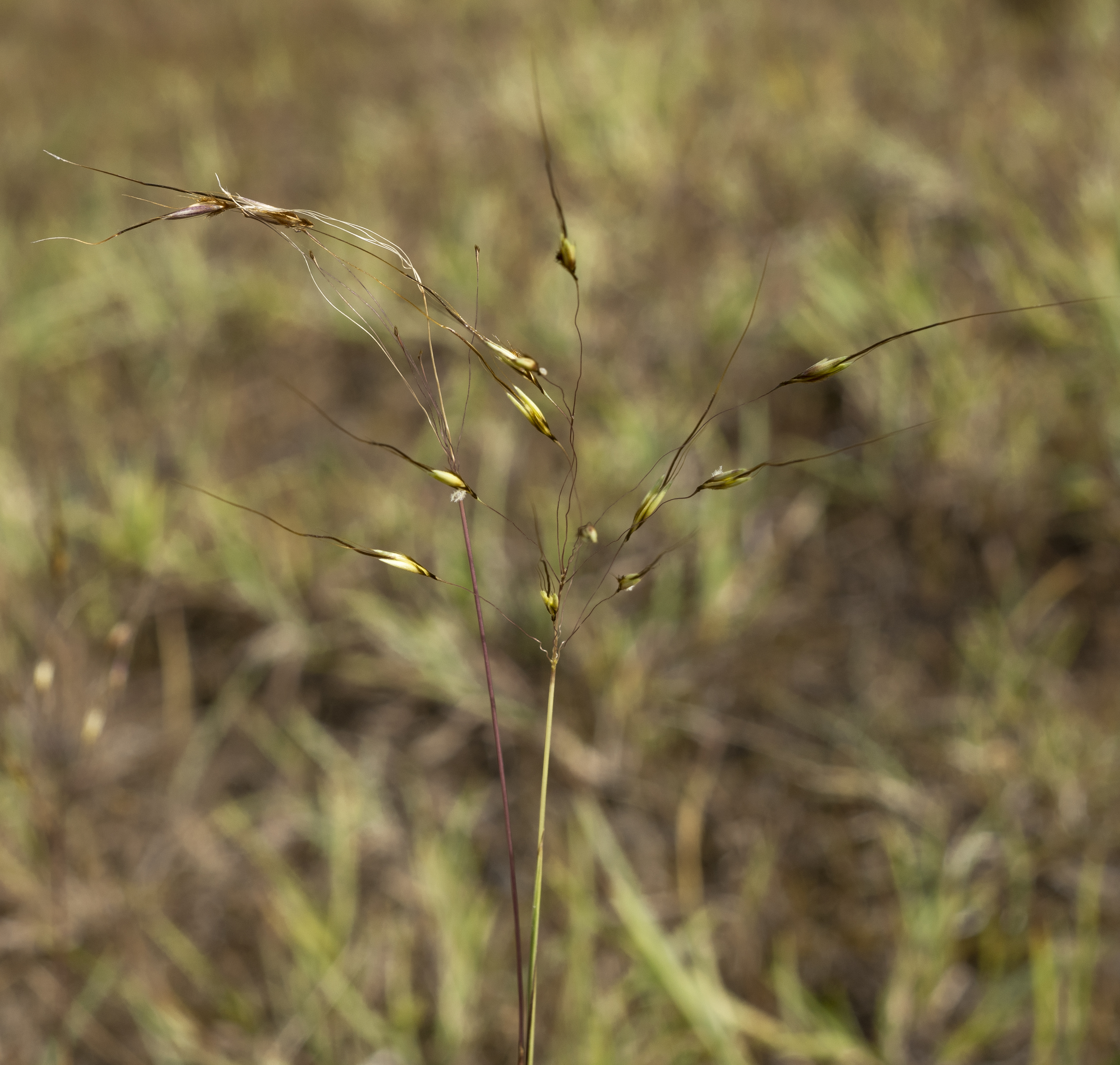
Chrysopogon fulvus (Spreng.) Chiov., a close-up of inflorescence

Chrysopogon fulvus, called Guria grass, red false beard grass, and reddish-yellow beardgrass, is a species of grass (family Poaceae), subfamily Panicoideae. It is native to the Indian subcontinent and Southeast Asia, and has been introduced to Florida. It is a palatable pasture grass, relished by oxen. It does well in semi-arid conditions.
