= Chrysopogon nigritanus =

Scientific classification
- Kingdom: Plantae
- Clade: Tracheophytes
- Clade: Angiosperms
- Clade: Monocots
- Clade: Commelinids
- Order: Poales
- Family: Poaceae
- Subfamily: Panicoideae
- Genus: Chrysopogon
- Species: C. nigritanus

Binomial name
- Chrysopogon nigritanus (Benth.) Veldkamp

Synonyms
- Andropogon nigritanus Benth.; Vetiveria nigritana (Benth.) Stapf

Species of grass

Chrysopogon nigritanus, more widely known by the taxonomic synonym Vetiveria nigritana, or the common name black vetivergrass, is a perennial grass species of the family Poaceae and therefore is also a monocotyledon. More specifically, Vetiveria nigritana is a very thick and tall type of grass that is deeply rooted within the ground and is usually used to protect crops and deter soil erosion. Vetiveria nigritana is also a native species to Africa and is most commonly seen in Nigeria, Northern Africa, Eastern Africa and tropical parts of Southern Africa. In addition, the plant, like other vetiver grasses, has been used in these regions due to its extreme drought tolerance, ability to grow in infertile soil and the fact that it can live under complete submergence. In fact, Vetiveria nigritana can thrive in a very diverse range of environmental and climatic conditions.

Vetiveria nigritana is a very beneficial plant within subsistence agriculture, especially in Africa, due to its ability to preserve soils and reduce water runoff, which ultimately is correlated with higher crop yields. In addition, the plant is also beneficial in protecting a farmers stored crop harvests and plants while in the field because the plant can be used as a repellent or a means of destroying pest larvae before they have the ability to affect a farmer’s cash crop. Vetiveria nigritana also has various cost-effective medical applications for subsistence farmers and can be used as feed to maintain livestock in the absence of other more common feeds.

== Related species ==
Chrysopogon zizanioides is a directly related species of the perennial type grass that has been more widely adopted by farmers, especially in India. However, the two forms of vetiver grass are very similar in their benefits and growing conditions; the largest difference is that Chrysopogon zizaniodes has been more widely studied and used, especially to create fragrances.

== Soil erosion and runoff prevention ==
One of the main benefits of using Vetiveria nigritana, especially in subsistence agriculture, is that it reduces soil erosion and nutrient loss associated with water runoff and wind displacement. Essentially, when Vetiveria nigritana is planted in hedgerows surrounding a crop or in multiple spaced rows, it creates a barrier that prevents soil run-off. This is because the plant’s thick grass structure is able to accumulate soil and nutrients, such as nitrogen, phosphorus and carbon that would otherwise have been lost due to runoff. In fact, studies have shown that planting Vetiveria nigritana hedgerows reduces soil loss by around 70%, which allows farmers to retain the nutrients within their soil. Secondly, the use of Vetiveria nigritana also reduces water runoff, in some cases by 130%, which is beneficial because in areas where irrigation is not present, conserving natural rainfall is essential for the survival of a farmer’s crop. In addition, the use of the type of vetiver grass is ideal in places like the African subtropics to prevent soil erosion and runoff because Vetiveria nigritana has been shown to be highly effective on a variety of different slopes in preventing the degradation of soil. Therefore, Vetiveria nigritana would benefit subsistence farmers because the increased nutrients, retention of soil and the accumulation of water that it causes would help to improve crop yields.

== Pest control ==
Another benefit of Vetiveria nigritana is its ability to deter pests from damaging crops while in the field during the growing season and from ruining the quality of plants while in storage. In Africa it was discovered that by planting Vetiveria nigritana in hedgerows around maize, that maize stem borers would attach to the plant more frequently than to maize and when the larvae hatched the potential borers died. In addition, Vetiveria nigritana is also beneficial in protecting certain crops after harvest, such as rice crops, because when the leaves of the plant are boiled in sea salt and then placed below and above the crop in a storage environment they act as a repellent for insects, while also preventing mold. Therefore, the use of Vetiveria nigritana would be beneficial to subsistence farmers because it would protect their crops and help ensure their survival.

== Livestock protection ==
Additionally, Vetiveria nigritana, like other forms of vetiver grasses, is beneficial in protecting the livestock of subsistence farmers. Even though vetiver grasses usually have a low protein ratio of about 8% they can be continuously harvested and fed to livestock if there is a shortage of other feeds for the animals due to poor harvests, diseased crops or contaminated storages. This is valuable to subsistence farmers because a lack of feed usually leads to animals being slaughtered. Therefore, as a result of the use of vetiver grasses, the fertilizer production and grazing benefits of livestock are not lost, which is another reason why they are ideal for subsistence farmers.

== Medical uses ==
There are many medical uses that have been derived from Vetiveria nigritana because the plant contains very high levels of essential oils that can be distilled and used for traditional medical applications. Firstly, Vetiveria nigritana can and has been used to increase the quality of the taste of drinking water in less developed nations such as Africa. In addition, the plant has also traditionally been used to eliminate pathogenic bacteria that are present. Lastly, Vetiveria nigritana is also beneficial at reducing diarrhea and has been used historically to treat children with a great deal of success. Therefore, Vetiveria nigritana is beneficial to poor farmers because it provides traditional cost effective ways to fight infections and disease.

== Increased crop yields ==
The use of Vetiveria nigritana is also valuable to farmers because it has directly been correlated with increased crops yields. Under certain forms of consistent cultivation, it was discovered that Vetiveria nigratana was beneficial in increasing maize yields by 49.1% and cassava yields by 3.2% when compared to fields that were not currently using the agricultural practice in Nigeria. This increase in crop yield associated with the use of Vetiveria nigritana would be ideal for poor and subsistence farmers because it could potentially increase the profits and food available to them for survival. In addition, the heightened crop yields that are caused by Vetiveria nigritana are largely facilitated due to its ability to reduce soil erosion and runoff.

== Additional practical information ==
There are two main ways that Vetiveria nigritana is commonly used in agriculture. Firstly, Vetiver Grass Strips (VGS) is a common form of Vetiveria nigritana use, which consists of hedge rowing vetiver grasses around a crop to reduce erosion, while still allowing for the cultivation benefits of spatial rowing. In addition, another common way to use Vetiveria nigritana that is beneficial to farmers is Vetiver Grass Mulch (VGM), which is a process of creating mulch out of the plant and then dispersing the residue over an area of farmland to decrease soil erosion and increase infiltration. As for advice for the growth of Vetiveria nigritana and other vetiver grasses, they should be planted quickly in wet areas if the farm is accustomed to severe runoff or the plant should propagated in containers and then transplanted to these areas, to ensure initial survival. In addition, the plants should be spaced six inches apart within hedgerows, and intervals of 5 meters between the rows have been shown to be the most effective in soil retention.
