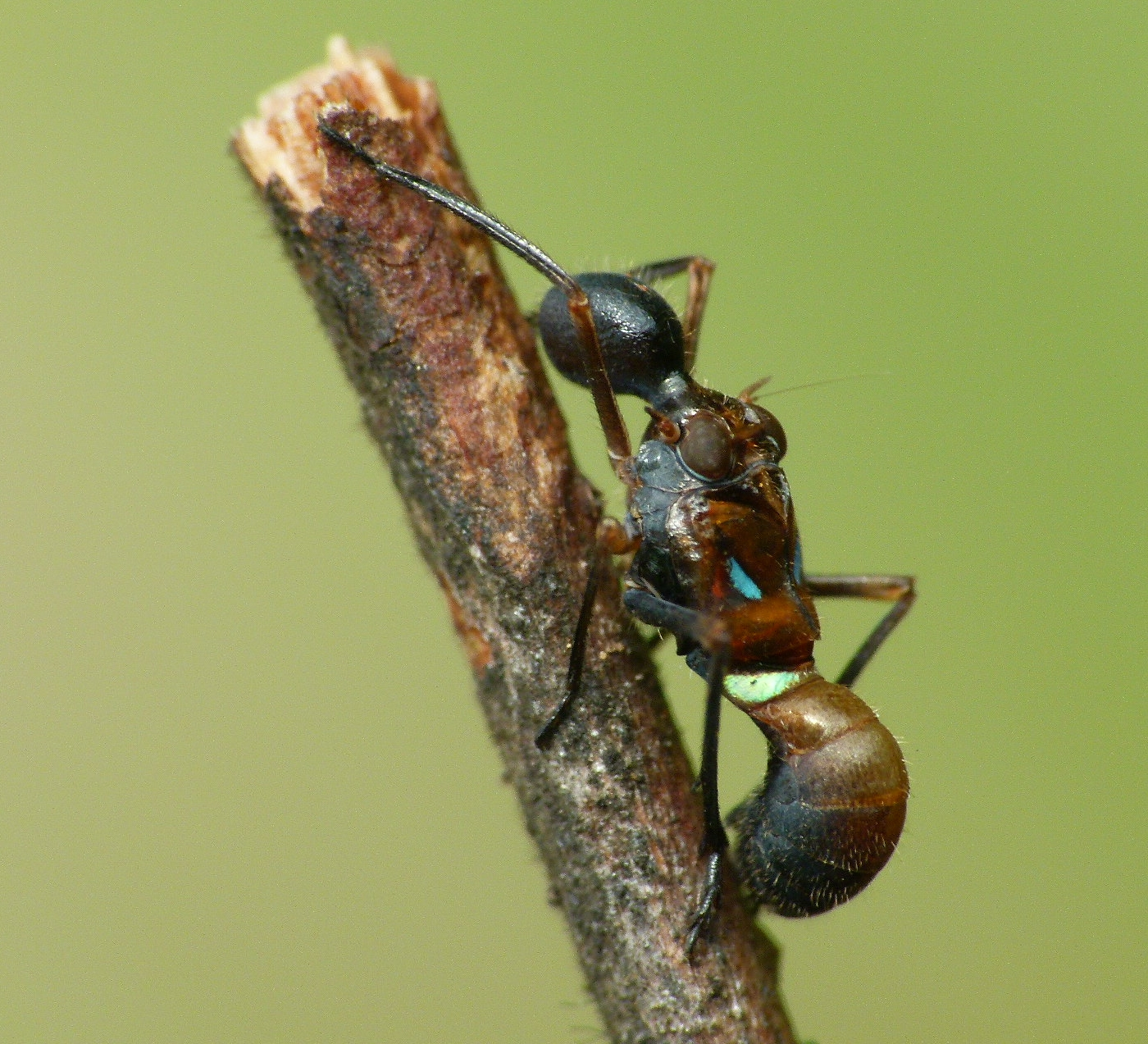
- Male F. indicus climbing a twig

Scientific classification
- Domain: Eukaryota
- Kingdom: Animalia
- Phylum: Arthropoda
- Class: Insecta
- Order: Hemiptera
- Suborder: Auchenorrhyncha
- Infraorder: Fulgoromorpha
- Family: Caliscelidae
- Tribe: Caliscelini
- Genus: Formiscurra; Gnezdilov & Viraktamath, 2011

Type species
- Formiscurra indicus Gnezdilov & Viraktamath, 2011

= Formiscurra =

Genus of true bugs

Formiscurra is a genus of planthopper in the family Caliscelidae with two species: Formiscurra indicus of southern India and Formiscurra atlas from southwestern Ethiopia. Like others of its family they have short wings, suck plant sap and escape by leaping. The species shows great sexual dimorphism. The males of this half centimeter-long insect have an enlarged lobe in front of its head, the frons or metope, giving it an ant-like appearance. Females do not have such an enlarged structure but have a slightly long snout and differ slightly in body shape. The species is found mainly on low vegetation in open scrub and grass habitats. It has been suggested, based on the Afro-Indian distribution, that the ancestral species of this and other genera, Chirodisca and Rhinogaster, evolved in Eurasia and spread to Africa 5-7 million years ago when the Tethys sea closed and thus their ancestors would have been part of the late Miocene Hipparion fauna.
