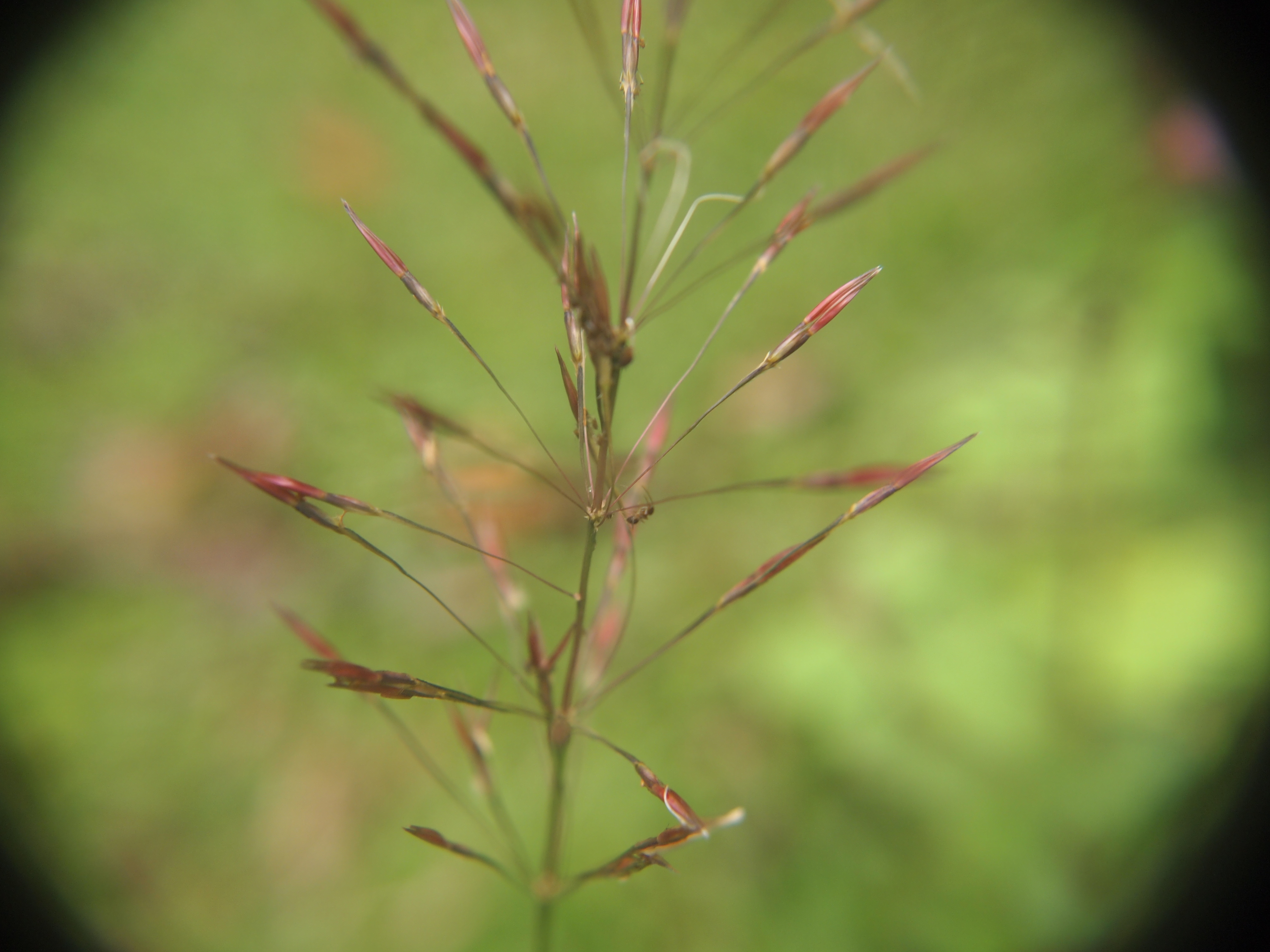

Scientific classification
- Kingdom: Plantae
- Clade: Tracheophytes
- Clade: Angiosperms
- Clade: Monocots
- Clade: Commelinids
- Order: Poales
- Family: Poaceae
- Subfamily: Panicoideae
- Genus: Chrysopogon
- Species: C. aciculatus

Binomial name
- Chrysopogon aciculatus (Retz.) Trin.

Synonyms
- Andropogon aciculatus Raphis acicularis

= Chrysopogon aciculatus =

Species of grass

Chrysopogon aciculatus (syn. Andropogon aciculatus) is a species of grass native to the tropics of Asia, Polynesia, and Australia at low elevations. Common names include amorseco (Spanish, "dry love"; not to be confused with the amor seco tree, Alchornea glandulosa), lesser spear grass, Mackie's pest, pilipiliʻula (or pilipiliula), and grama-amorosa (Brazilian Portuguese). It is native to Tahiti as accounted in James Cook's records of his first voyage; but may have been an accidental introduction to Samoan and Hawaiian islands by Polynesian settlers there.

The grass is widely considered an invasive species, but some cultures use it for medicinal purposes.

Its flowering stems are about 20 to 60 centimeters high and its leaves are linear-lanceolate and about 3 to 10 centimeters long by 4 to 6 centimeters wide. The panicles are purplish, open and with few whorled branches and can reach about 5 centimeters long, bearing few-flowered spikes. The sessile spikelet is very narrow, about 3 millimeters long. The callus is elongated and barbed and the fourth glume is linear, acuminate, and awned.

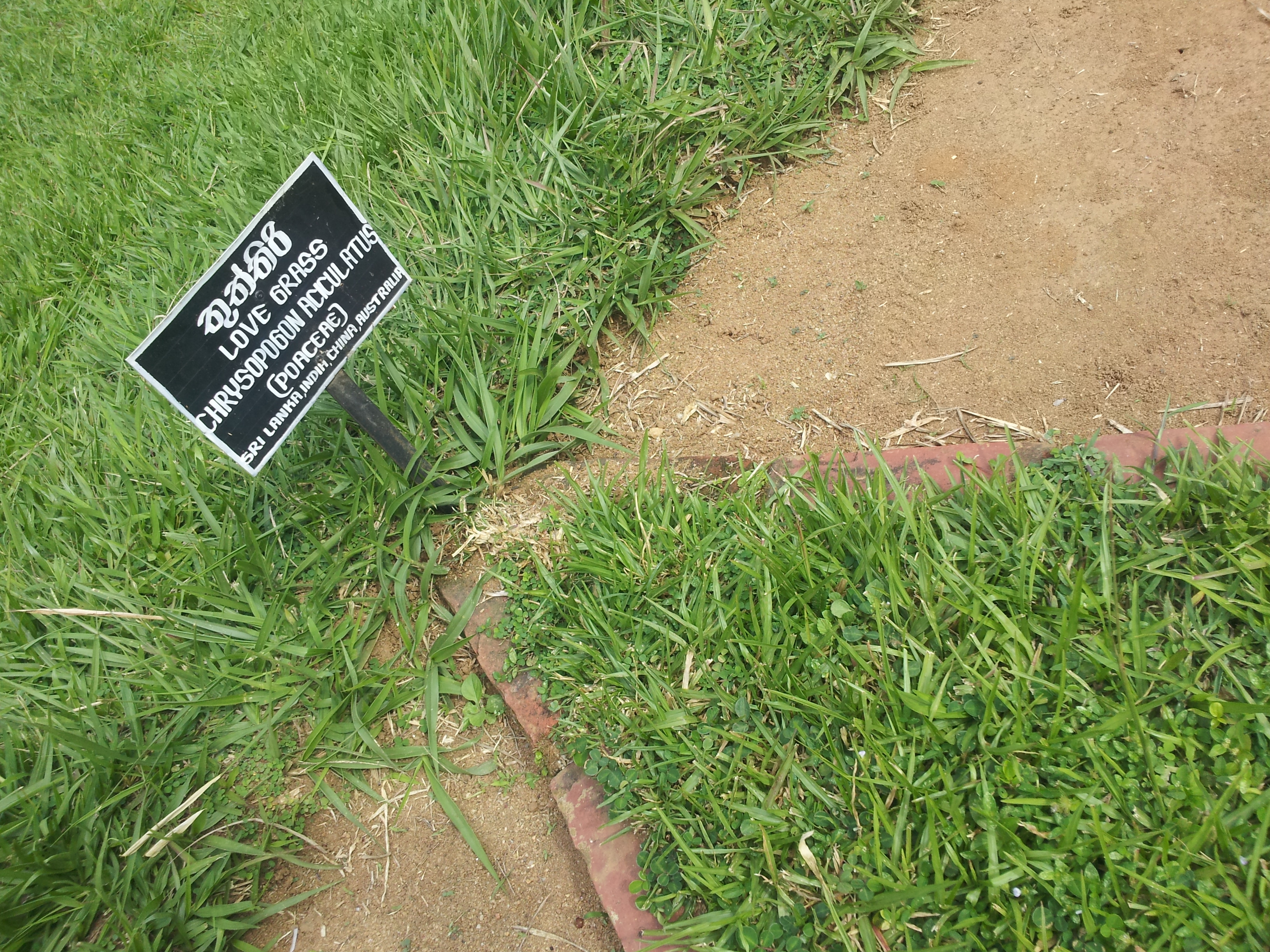
at Peradeniya Royal Botanical Garden
