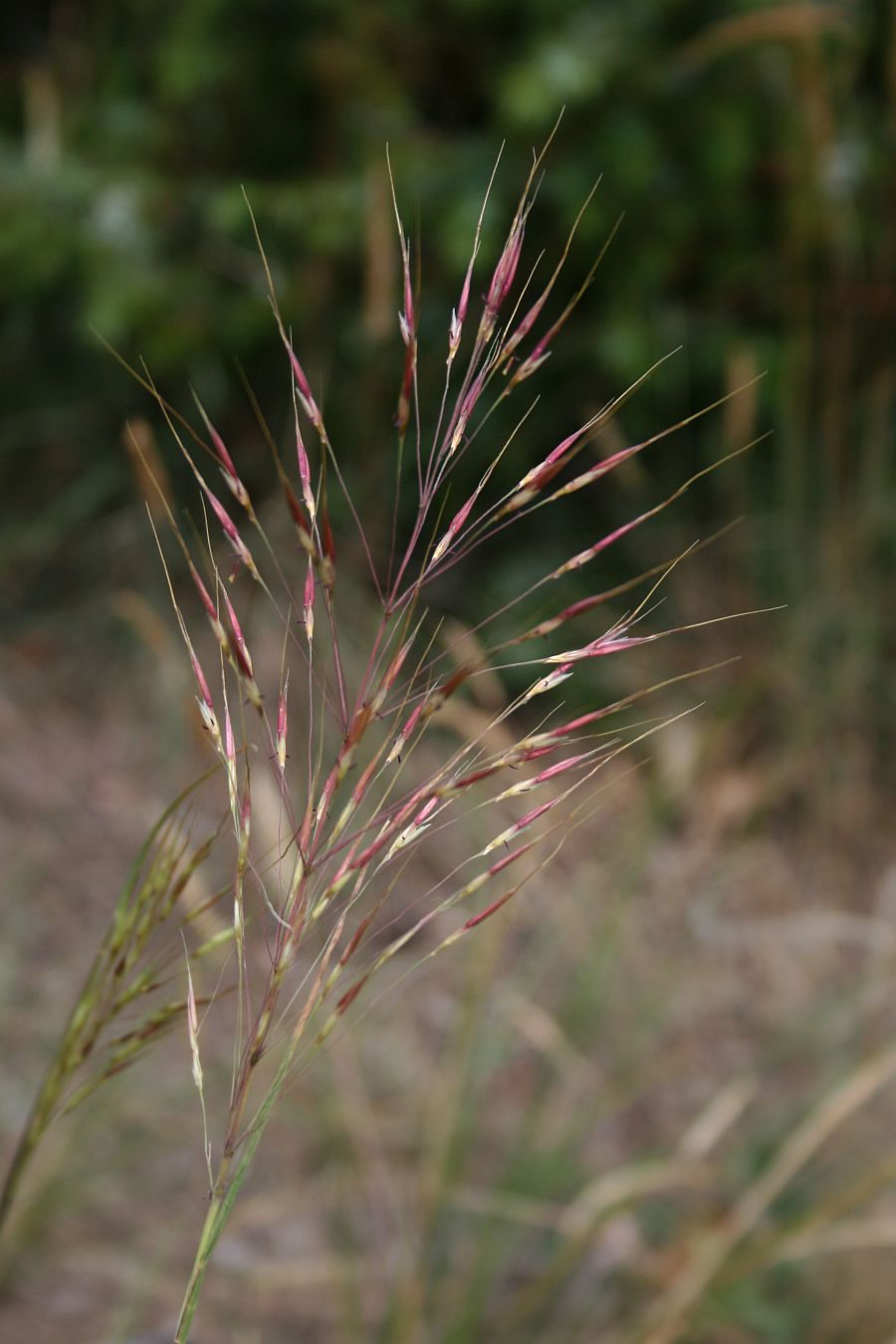

Scientific classification
- Kingdom: Plantae
- Clade: Tracheophytes
- Clade: Angiosperms
- Clade: Monocots
- Clade: Commelinids
- Order: Poales
- Family: Poaceae
- Subfamily: Panicoideae
- Genus: Chrysopogon
- Species: C. gryllus

Binomial name
- Chrysopogon gryllus (L.) Trin., 1820

= Chrysopogon gryllus =

Species of grass

Chrysopogon gryllus is a perennial bunchgrass of the family Poaceae, native to Europe and tropical and temperate Asia.

The grass grows to 50–150 cm (20–59 in) in height. Spikelets are associated in threes, of which the fertile one is unisexual with the other two staminal or not completely developed. The fruit is corn seed.
