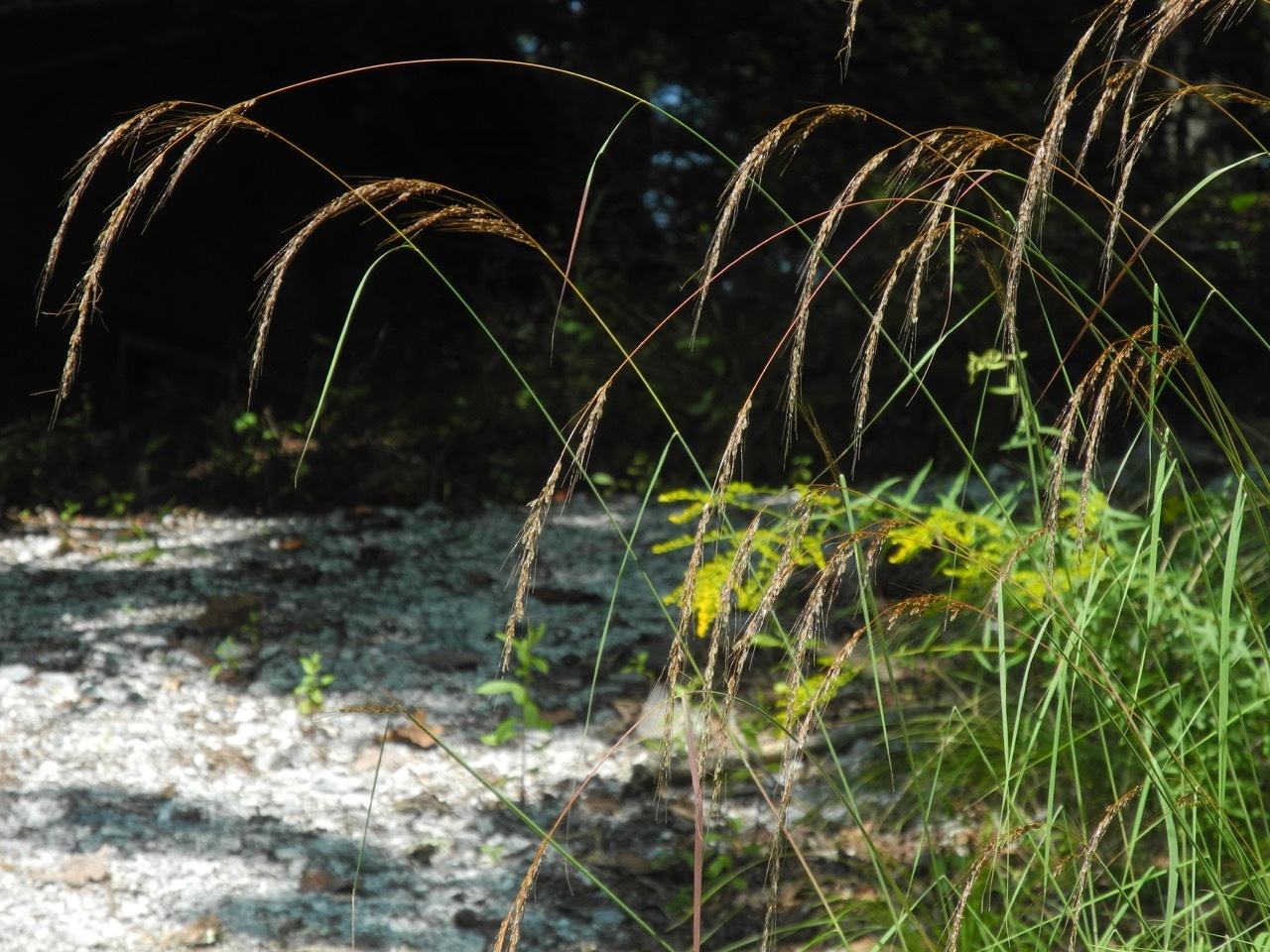

Scientific classification
- Kingdom: Plantae
- Clade: Tracheophytes
- Clade: Angiosperms
- Clade: Monocots
- Clade: Commelinids
- Order: Poales
- Family: Poaceae
- Subfamily: Panicoideae
- Genus: Sorghastrum
- Species: S. elliottii

Binomial name
- Sorghastrum elliottii (C. Mohr) Nash

Synonyms
- Andropogon nutans Muhl., 1817; Chrysopogon elliottii C.Mohr; Sorghastrum apalachicolense D.W.Hall

= Sorghastrum elliottii =

Species of grass

Sorghastrum elliottii, commonly referred to as slender Indiangrass, is a species of perennial graminoid found in North America.

== Description ==
Sorghastrum elliottii possesses culms that range in height from 0.4 to 2 m (1.3 to 6.6 ft) and scaberulous blades that reach a length of up 60 cm (24 in) and a width of 10 mm (0.4 in). Sheaths are normally glabrous with scarious margins.

The panicles are elongated with smooth, purplish rachis and peduncles that range in length from 1 to 20 mm (0.04 to 0.79 in). Spikelets occur in pairs; they are ovoid in shape and are between 5 and 8 mm (0.2 and 0.3 in) in length. When grain is produced it is reddish in color, 2.5 to 3 mm (0.10 to 0.12 in) in length, and ellipsoid to obovoid in shape.

This species possesses fibrous roots.

== Distribution and habitat ==
Within the United States, S. elliottii may be found in the southeastern region of the country, its range stretching from Maryland south to Florida and westward to Texas. It has been observed as far north as Indiana.

This species may be found in habitats such as in river-scour environments, as well as forests and woodlands.
