= Ommatidiotus =

Scientific classification
- Domain: Eukaryota
- Kingdom: Animalia
- Phylum: Arthropoda
- Class: Insecta
- Order: Hemiptera
- Suborder: Auchenorrhyncha
- Infraorder: Fulgoromorpha
- Family: Caliscelidae
- Genus: Ommatidiotus; Spinola, 1839

Genus of true bugs

Ommatidiotus is a genus of true bugs belonging to the family Caliscelidae.

The species of this genus are found in Europe.

Species:

- Ommatidiotus acutus Horváth, 1905
- Ommatidiotus alternans Horváth, 1916
- Ommatidiotus dissimilis (Fallén, 1806)
- Ommatidiotus iranicus Horváth, 1905
