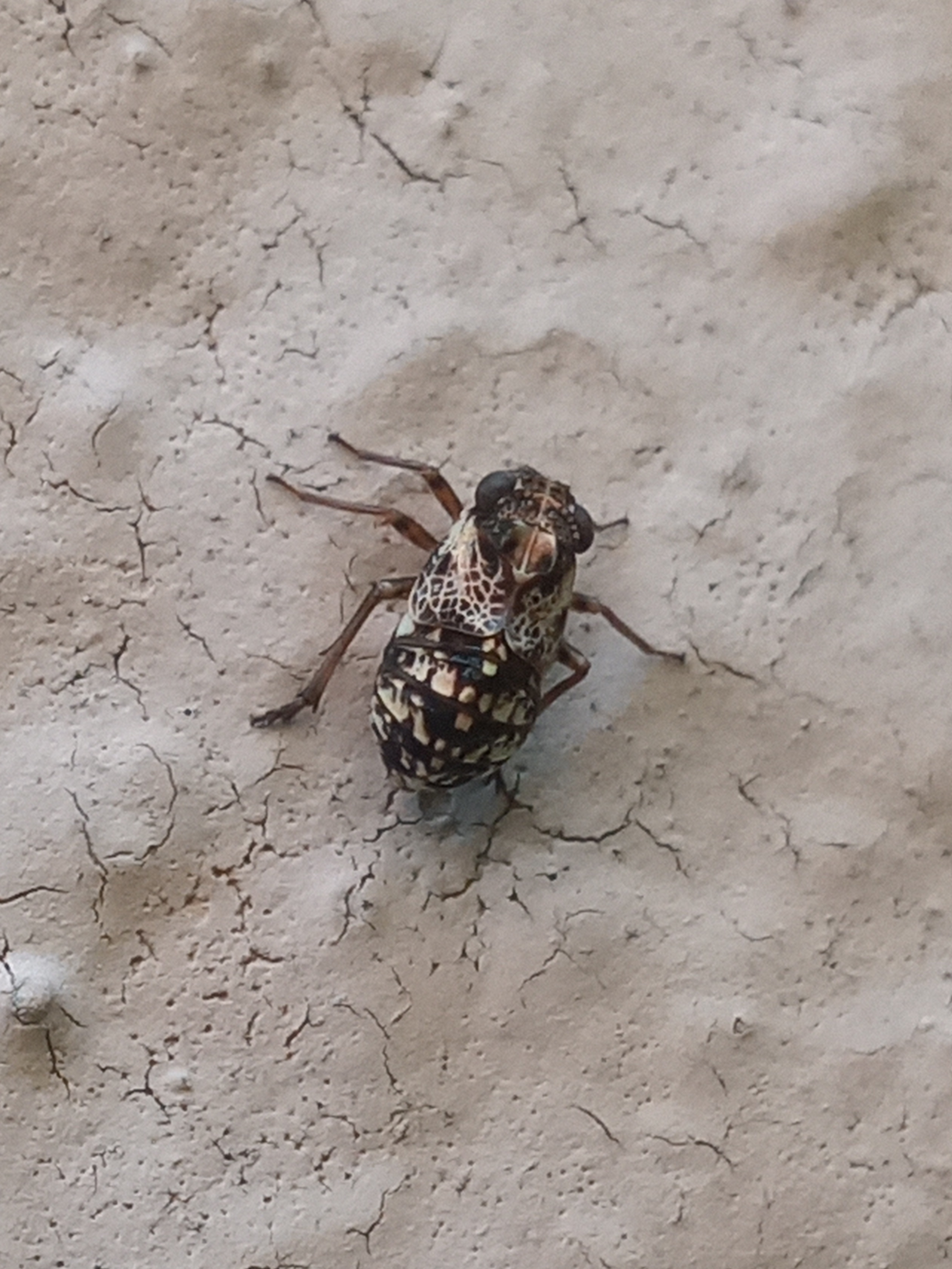
- Bruchomorpha decorata

Scientific classification
- Kingdom: Animalia
- Phylum: Arthropoda
- Class: Insecta
- Order: Hemiptera
- Suborder: Auchenorrhyncha
- Infraorder: Fulgoromorpha
- Family: Caliscelidae
- Subfamily: Caliscelinae
- Tribe: Peltonotellini
- Genus: Bruchomorpha; Newman, 1838

Species
- See text

= Bruchomorpha =

Family of true bugs

Bruchomorpha is a genus of planthoppers, sap-sucking insects that belong to the order Hemiptera, suborder Auchenorrhyncha, superfamily Fulgoroidea, family Caliscelidae, subfamily Caliscelinae and tribe Peltonotellini.
