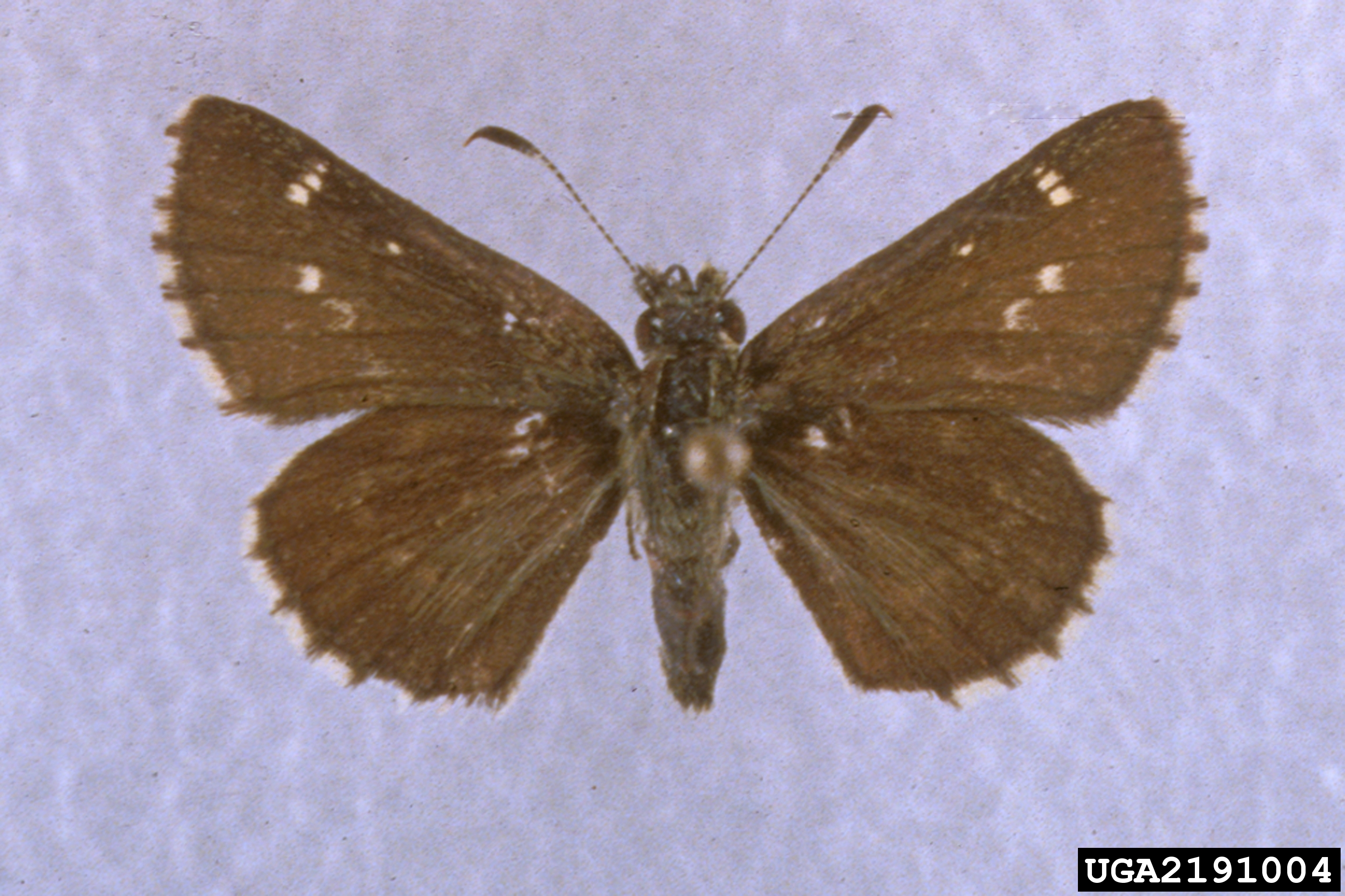

Conservation status
- Secure (NatureServe)

Scientific classification
- Kingdom: Animalia
- Phylum: Arthropoda
- Clade: Pancrustacea
- Class: Insecta
- Order: Lepidoptera
- Family: Hesperiidae
- Genus: Amblyscirtes
- Species: A. hegon

Binomial name
- Amblyscirtes hegon (Scudder, 1864)

Synonyms
- Hesperia hegon Scudder, 1864; Hesperia samoset Scudder, 1863; Hesperia nemoris Edwards, 1864; Pyrgus argina Plötz, 1884

= Amblyscirtes hegon =

Pepper-and-salt skipper

Species of butterfly

Amblyscirtes hegon, the pepper-and-salt skipper, is a butterfly of the family Hesperiidae. It is found from Nova Scotia and Maine, west to southern Manitoba, south to Georgia, northern Florida and south-eastern Texas. It is mostly absent from the coastal plain.

The wingspan is 25–31 mm. Adults are on wing from April to July. There is one generation per year.

The larvae feed on Poa pratensis, Sorghastrum nutans, Sorghastrum secundum, and Chasmanthium latifolia. Adults feed on flower nectar, including viburnum and blackberry.
