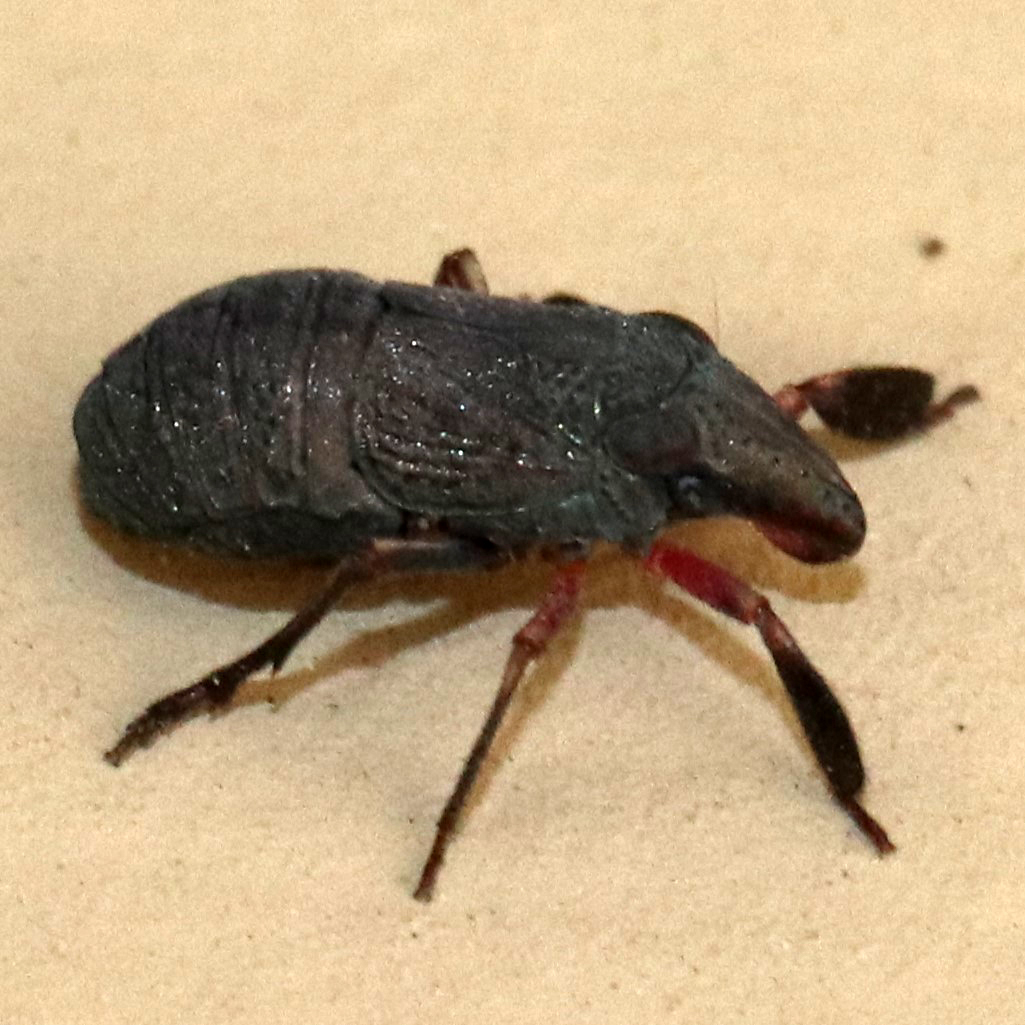
- Fitchiella robertsonii

Scientific classification
- Kingdom: Animalia
- Phylum: Arthropoda
- Class: Insecta
- Order: Hemiptera
- Suborder: Auchenorrhyncha
- Infraorder: Fulgoromorpha
- Family: Caliscelidae
- Genus: Fitchiella; Van Duzee

Type species
- Fitchiella robertsonii (Fitch, 1856)

= Fitchiella =

Genus of insects

Fitchiella is a genus of plant-hoppers found in North America.

== Taxonomy ==
Fitchiella contains the following species:

- Fitchiella melichari
- Fitchiella robertsonii
- Fitchiella rugosa
- Fitchiella fitchii
- Fitchiella rufipes
