= Chrysopogon fallax =

Scientific classification
- Kingdom: Plantae
- Clade: Tracheophytes
- Clade: Angiosperms
- Clade: Monocots
- Clade: Commelinids
- Order: Poales
- Family: Poaceae
- Subfamily: Panicoideae
- Genus: Chrysopogon
- Species: C. fallax

Binomial name
- Chrysopogon fallax S.T.Blake, 1944

Synonyms
- Chrysopogon benthamianus

Species of flowering plant

Chrysopogon fallax is a perennial tufted grass endemic to Australia found in all mainland states except Victoria. It is commonly known as golden beard grass, ribbon grass, and weeping grass.

== Etymology ==
Chrysopogon is derived from the Greek words chrysos for golden, and pogon meaning beard. fallax comes from the Latin word for 'deceptive' because it is hard to distinguish from similar grass species. The synonym Chrysopogon benthamianus is sometimes used for this taxon.

== Distribution and habitat ==
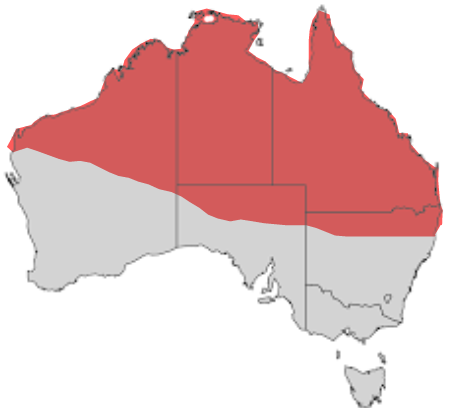
Distribution map Chrysopogon fallax

Chrysopogon fallax is common in the northern areas of continental Australia in tropical and subtropical climates, most often in open woodland and forest ecosystems. It is highly adaptable to a wide variety of substrates including sand, loam and clay soils.

== Description ==
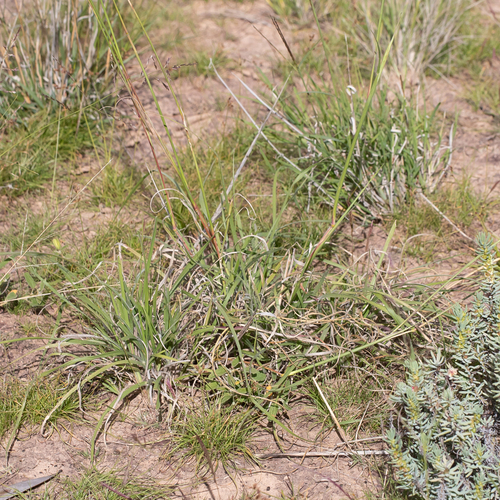
Tufts of Chrysopogon fallax from Queensland Australia

Chrysopogon fallax is a densely tufted perennial grass spreading by rooting stolons as well as seed. Most leaves are basal and dead sheaths remain attached giving the plant a characteristic 'wooly' appearance. Culms are 30–120 cm (12–47 in) tall with 3–5 glabrous nodes. Ligule is a row of fine hairs. Blades of leaves are up to 45 cm (18 in) long and 2–7 mm (0.079–0.276 in) wide. Inflorescence is an open panicle (7–21 cm (2.8–8.3 in) long) with main branches arranged in whorls. Spikelets are in pairs, one sessile and one pedicelled, the latter usually male or sterile. Awn geniculate (strongly bent) with a scabrous column. Callus hairs golden/yellow in colour to 2 mm (0.079 in) long. Flowering is from October to July.

== Ecology ==
In northern Australia the seeds of Chrysopogon fallax are important food for the Gouldian finch, especially during the wet season. The finches grasp multiple grass stems to support their weight while they pick the seeds from the seed heads. Flocks move across areas of dense seeding Chrysopogon fallax in a wave-like motion as birds continuously move from the back of the flock to the front. The roots of Chrysopogon fallax may be dug up and eaten by spectacled hare-wallabies (Lagorchestes conspicillatus) and other small macropods.

Native grasslands become less biodiverse when cover of exotic grasses increases. In north-eastern Queensland research has shown that cover of native grasses including Chrysopogon fallax declines as the introduced grass Bothriochloa pertusa increases in abundance. This likely due to a mixture of direct competition, selective grazing of more palatable natives (such as Chrysopogon fallax) and a reduction in the number of seed dispersing ant species present due to exotic grass cover.

A large number of different Ustilaginomycetes (smut fungi) have been described from Chrysopogon fallax inflorescences.

=== Seed dispersal ===
Chrysopogon fallax is slow to expand into available ground and to recolonise areas where it has been lost. Studies with similar Chrysopogon species suggest that wind as well as ants are major methods of seed dispersal.

Both seeding and the production of reproductive tillers is increased following fire.

== Economic importance ==
Chrysopogon fallax is important as a cattle feed in arid areas of northern Australia. It can survive heavy defoliation and thus is able to persist under moderate to heavy grazing regimes. Its palatability to stock is likely to vary widely depending on local growing conditions and soil substrates.
