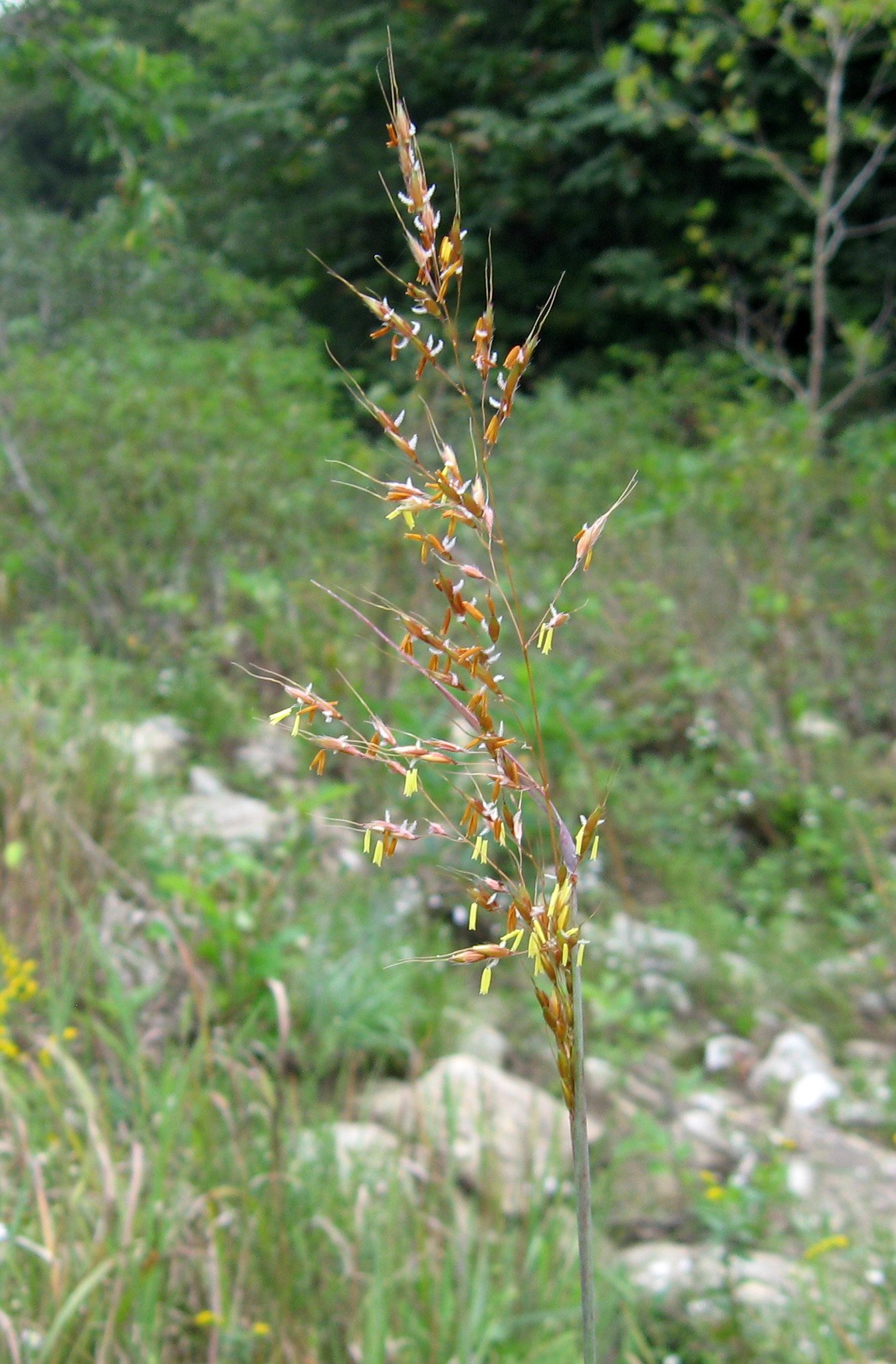
- Indiangrass in bloom

Scientific classification
- Kingdom: Plantae
- Clade: Tracheophytes
- Clade: Angiosperms
- Clade: Monocots
- Clade: Commelinids
- Order: Poales
- Family: Poaceae
- Subfamily: Panicoideae
- Genus: Sorghastrum
- Species: S. nutans

Binomial name
- Sorghastrum nutans (L.) Nash

Synonyms
- Andropogon avenaceus Michx.; Andropogon nutans L.; Andropogon nutans var. avenaceus (Michx.) Hack.; Chrysopogon avenaceus (Michx.) Benth.; Sorghastrum avenaceum (Michx.) Nash

= Sorghastrum nutans =

Species of grass

Sorghastrum nutans, known as Indiangrass, is a North American prairie grass found in the United States and Canada, especially in the Great Plains and tallgrass prairies. It is sometimes called Indian grass, yellow Indian-grass, or wood grass.

== Description ==
Indiangrass is a warm-season perennial bunchgrass. It is intolerant to shade. It grows 3 to 7 feet (1 to 2 m) tall, and is distinguished by a "rifle-sight" ligule where the leaf blade attaches to the leaf sheath. The leaf is about 3 feet (1 m) long.

It blooms from late summer to early fall, producing branched clusters (panicles) of spikelets. The spikelets are golden-brown during the blooming period, and each contain one perfect floret that has three large, showy yellow stamens and two feather-like stigmas. One of the two glumes at the base of the spikelets is covered in silky white hairs. The flowers are cross-pollinated by the wind.

The branches of pollinated flower clusters bend outwards. At maturity, the seeds fall to the ground. There are about 175,000 seeds per pound.

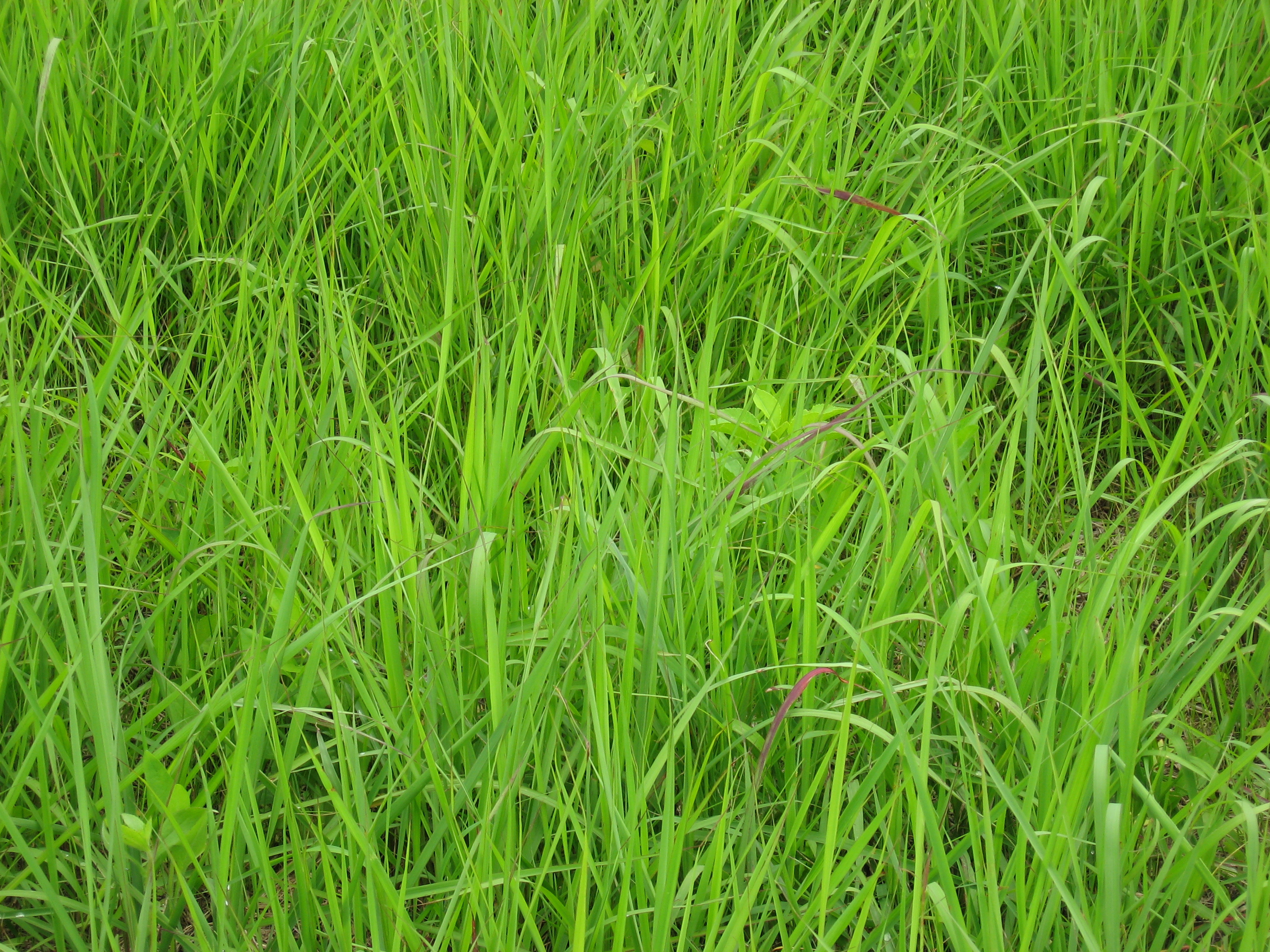
Leaves in June

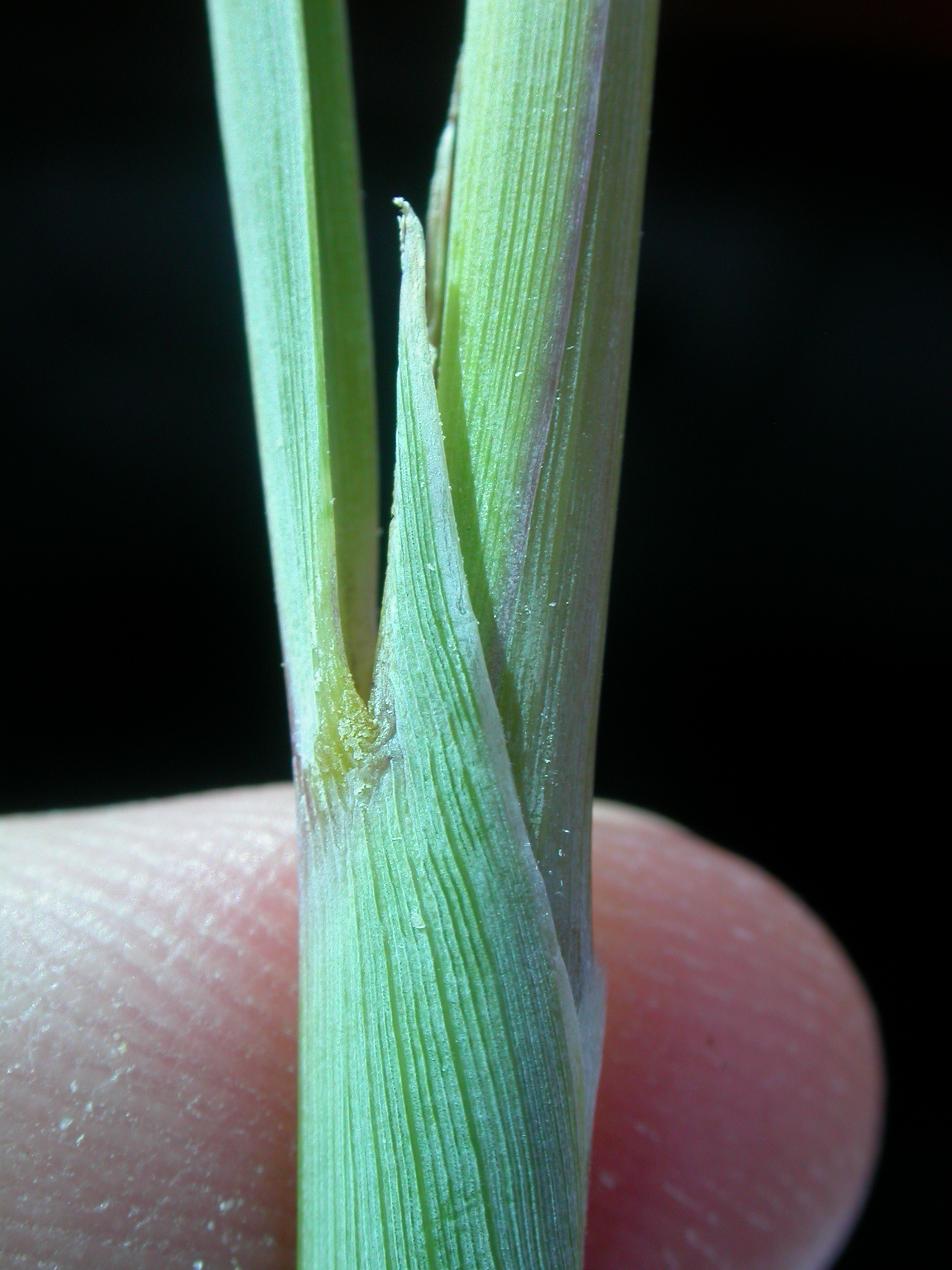
"Rifle-sight" ligule at the base of a leaf

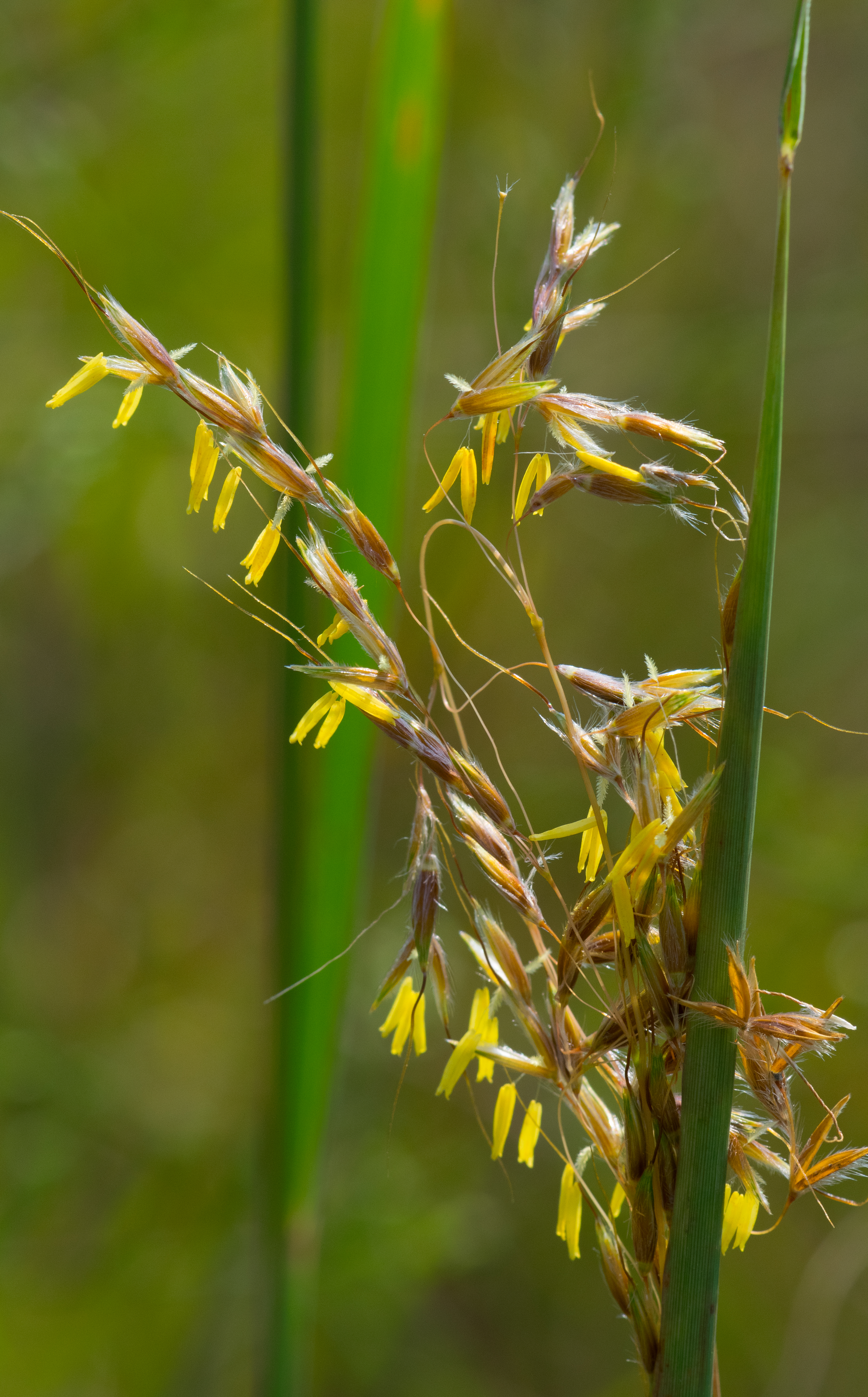
Flowers with yellow stamens and golden-brown spikelets

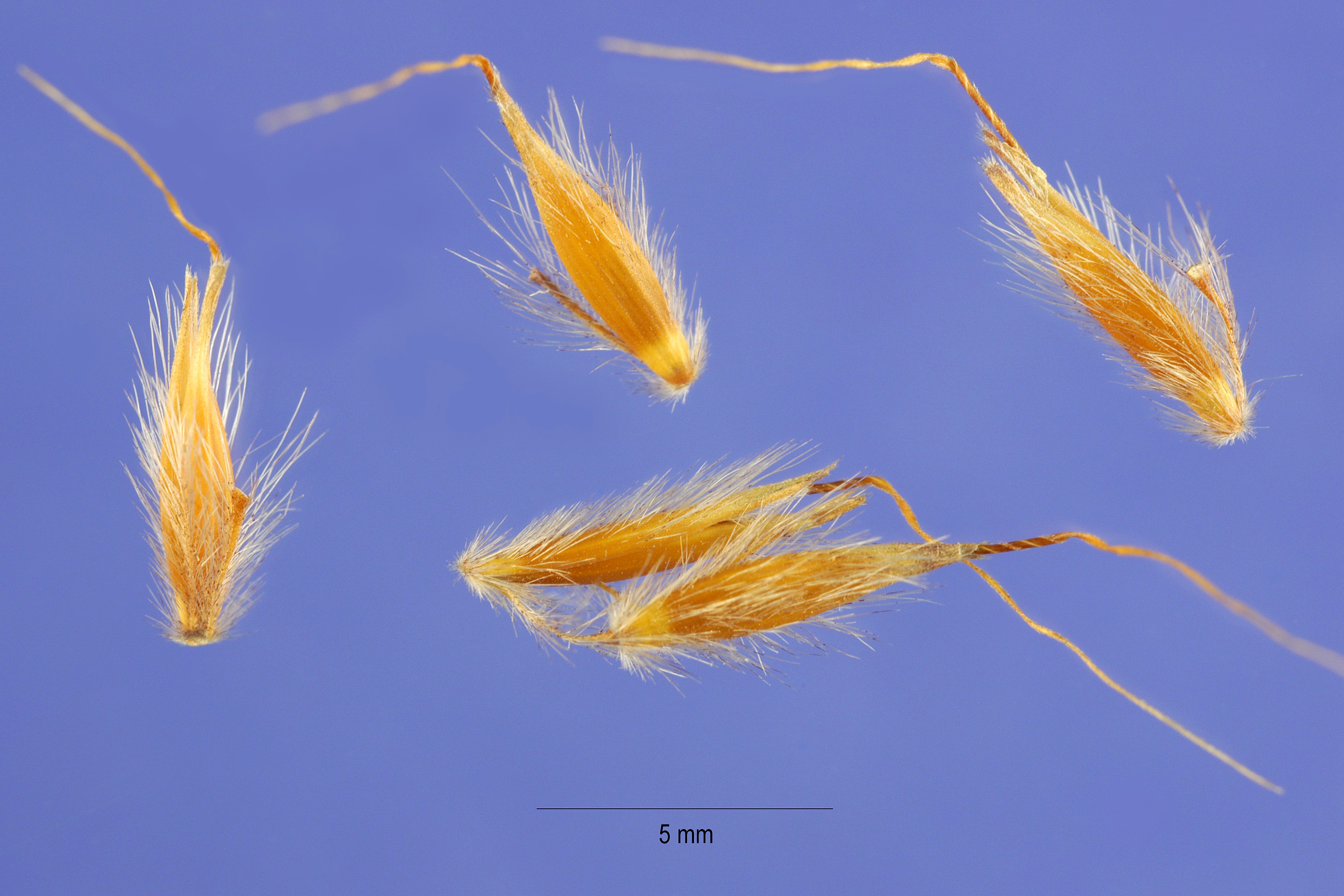
Closeup of seeds

== Ecology ==
Sorghastrum nutans is prominent in the tallgrass prairie ecosystem and the northern, central, and Flint Hills tall grassland ecoregions, along with the grasses big bluestem (Andropogon gerardi), little bluestem (Schizachyrium scoparium) and switchgrass (Panicum virgatum). It is also common in areas of longleaf pine.

Indiangrass is adapted in the United States from the southern border to Canada and from the eastern seaboard to Montana, Wyoming and Utah.

It regrows with renewed vitality after fires, so controlled burns are used, replacing extirpated large herbivores (i.e. bison), for habitat renewal.

It is a larval host to the pepper-and-salt skipper.

== Culture ==
Indiangrass is the official state grass of both Oklahoma and South Carolina.

The USDA Natural Resources Conservation Service lists the following uses for Sorghastrum nutans: erosion control, livestock, pollinators, restoration, and wildlife.
