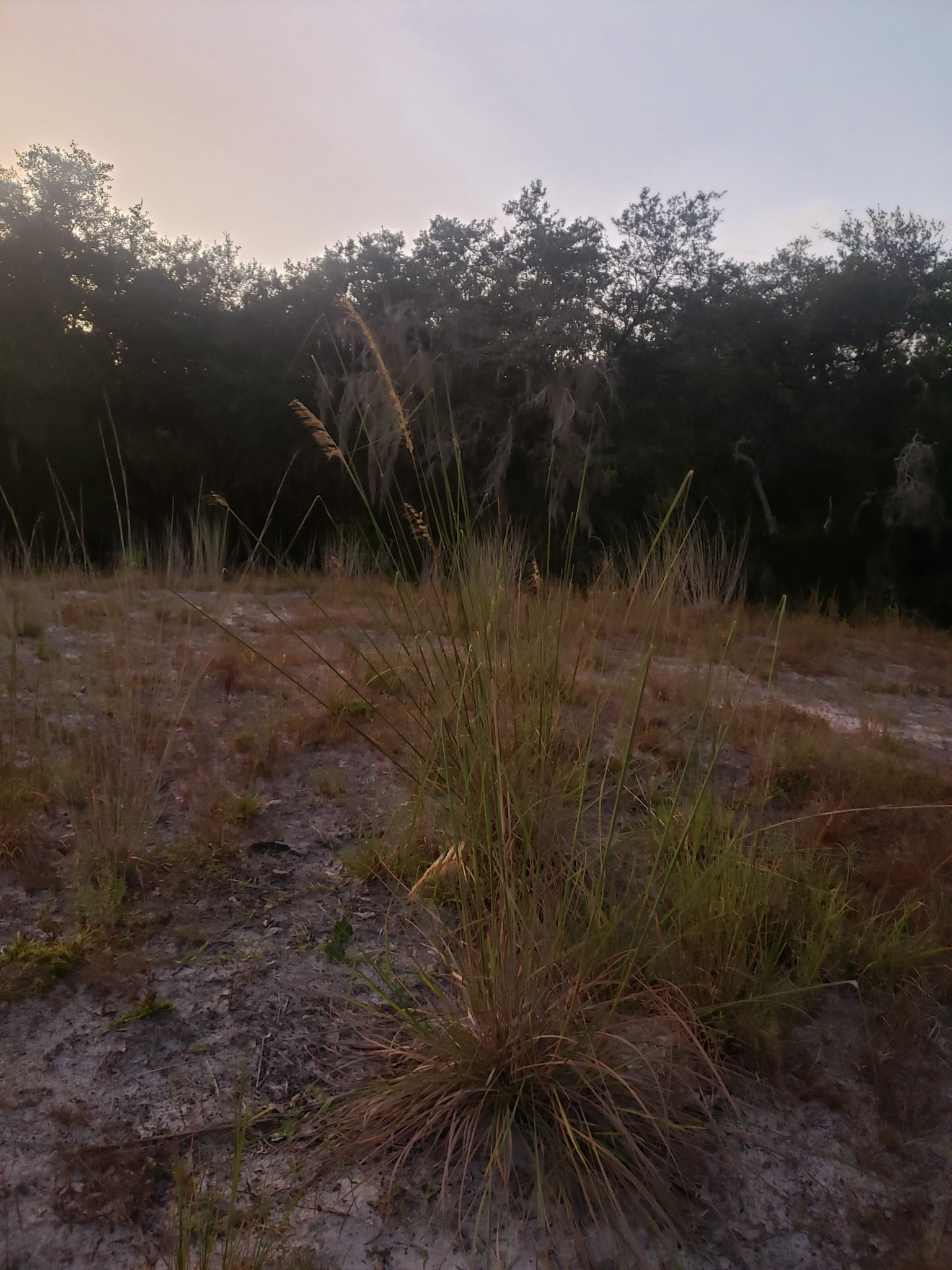

Conservation status
- Secure (NatureServe)

Scientific classification
- Kingdom: Plantae
- Clade: Tracheophytes
- Clade: Angiosperms
- Clade: Monocots
- Clade: Commelinids
- Order: Poales
- Family: Poaceae
- Subfamily: Panicoideae
- Genus: Sorghastrum
- Species: S. secundum

Binomial name
- Sorghastrum secundum (Elliott) Nash

= Sorghastrum secundum =

Species of grass

Sorghastrum secundum is a species of grass known by the common name lopsided Indiangrass. It is native to the Southeastern United States.

This species is a perennial bunchgrass growing up to 6 ft (1.8 m) tall. The flat leaf blades are up to 24 in (610 mm) long. The ligule is pointed. The inflorescence is one-sided.

This plant provides forage for livestock. It grows best on well-drained soils. It is a larval host plant to the pepper-and-salt skipper.
