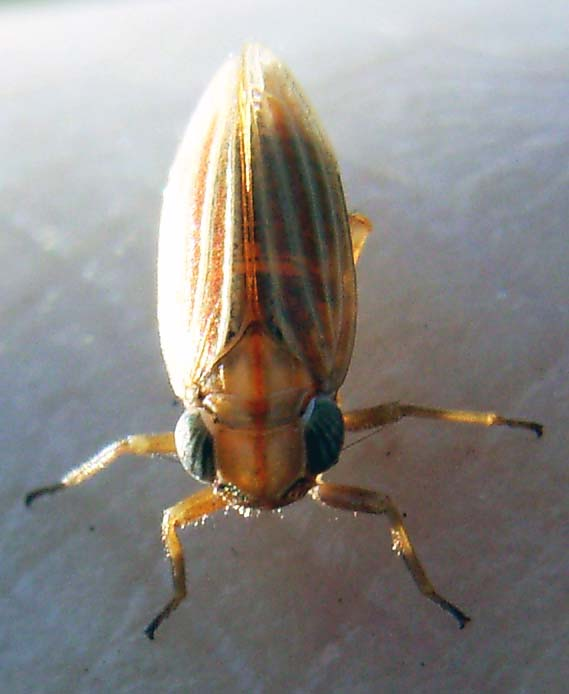
- Female Ommatidiotus dissimilis

Scientific classification
- Kingdom: Animalia
- Phylum: Arthropoda
- Class: Insecta
- Order: Hemiptera
- Suborder: Auchenorrhyncha
- Infraorder: Fulgoromorpha
- Superfamily: Fulgoroidea
- Family: Caliscelidae; Amyot & Serville, 1843

Subfamilies
- See text

= Caliscelidae =

Family of true bugs

Caliscelidae is a family of planthoppers, sap-sucking insects that belong to the order Hemiptera, suborder Auchenorrhyncha and superfamily Fulgoroidea. They are somewhat anomalous and have often been included within the family Issidae. Studies made in 2013 of the phylogeny of the Issidae and other groups using molecular techniques support the treatment of the group as a separate family. Sexual dimorphism can be marked. Some members of the family are called piglet bugs due to the shape of their snout. A particularly aberrant genus described in 2011 from India, Formiscurra, has males that resemble ants.

== Subfamilies and tribes ==
- Caliscelinae Amyot & Audinet-Serville, 1843
  - Caliscelini Amyot & Audinet-Serville, 1843
    - Afronaso Jacobi, 1910
    - Ahomocnemiella Kusnezov, 1929
    - Annamatissus Gnezdilov & Bourgoin, 2014
    - Asarcopus Horváth, 1921
    - Bambusicaliscelis Chen & Zhang, 2011
    - Bolbonaso Emeljanov, 2007
    - Bruchoscelis Melichar, 1906
    - Calampocus Gnezdilov & Bourgoin, 2009
    - Caliscelis De Laporte, 1833
    - Chirodisca Emeljanov, 1996
    - Formiscurra Gnezdilov & Viraktamath, 2011
    - Gelastissus Kirkaldy, 1906
    - Griphissus Fennah, 1967
    - Gwurra Linnavuori, 1973
    - Homocnemia Costa, 1857
    - Issopulex China & Fennah, 1960
    - Madaceratops Gnezdilov, 2011
    - Myrmissus Linnavuori, 1973
    - Nenasa Chan & Yang, 1994
    - Nubianus Gnezdilov & Bourgoin, 2009
    - Ordalonema Dlabola, 1980
    - Patamadaga Gnezdilov & Bourgoin, 2009
    - Populonia Jacobi, 1910
    - Reinhardema Gnezdilov, 2010
    - Rhinogaster Fennah, 1949
    - Rhinoploeus Gnezdilov & Bourgoin, 2009
    - Savanopulex Dlabola, 1987
    - Sphenax Gnezdilov & Bourgoin, 2009
    - Thaiscelis Gnezdilov, 2015
    - Ugandana Metcalf, 1952
  - Peltonotellini Emeljanov, 2008
    - Acromega Emeljanov, 1996
    - Aphelonema Uhler, 1876
    - Bergrothora Metcalf, 1952
    - Bruchomorpha Newman, 1838
    - Ceragra Emeljanov, 1996
    - Concepcionella Schmidt, 1927
    - Fitchiella Van Duzee, 1917
    - Homaloplasis Melichar, 1906
    - Itatiayana Metcalf, 1952
    - Nenema Emeljanov, 1996
    - Ohausiella Schmidt, 1910
    - Papagona Ball, 1935
    - Paranaso Schmidt, 1932
    - Peltonotellus Puton, 1886
    - Peripola Melichar, 1907
    - Plagiopsis Berg, 1883
    - Plagiopsola Schmidt, 1927
    - Semiperipola Schmidt, 1910
- Ommatidiotinae Fieber, 1875
  - Adenissini Dlabola, 1980
    - Adenissina Dlabola, 1980
    - Bocrina Emeljanov, 1999
    - Coinquendina Gnezdilov & Wilson, 2006
    - Pteriliina Gnezdilov & Wilson, 2006
  - Augilini Baker, 1915
    - Anthracidium Emeljanov, 2013
    - Augila Stål, 1870
    - Augilina Melichar, 1914
    - Augilodes Fennah, 1963
    - Campures Gnezdilov, 2015
    - Cano Gnezdilov, 2011
    - Cicimora Emeljanov, 1998
    - Discote Emeljanov, 2013
    - Pseudosymplanella Che, Zhang & Webb, 2009
    - †Quizqueiplana Bourgoin & Wang, 2015
    - Signoreta Gnezdilov & Bourgoin, 2009
    - Symplana Kirby, 1891
    - Symplanella Fennah, 1987
    - Symplanodes Fennah, 1987
    - Tubilustrium Distant, 1916
  - Ommatidiotini Fieber, 1875
    - Ommatidiotus Spinola, 1839
- incertae sedis
  - Peltonotellus Kusnezov, 1930
