= George Valentine Nash =

American botanist (1864–1921)

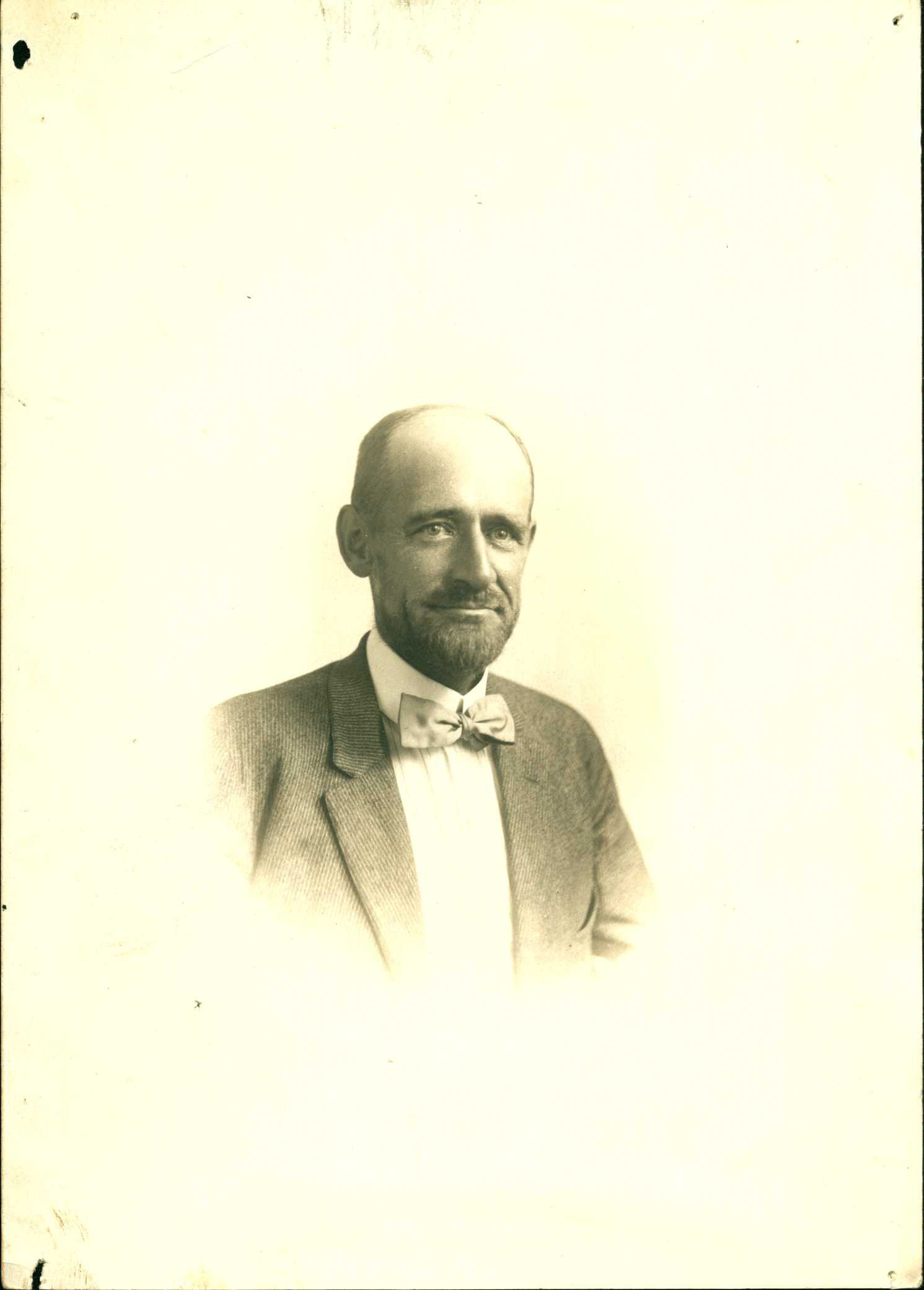
- Born: May 6, 1864; Brooklyn, New York, United States
- Died: July 15, 1921 (aged 57); The Fordham neighborhood in the Bronx, New York, United States
- Scientific career
- Fields: Botany, Horticulture
- Workplaces: New York Botanical Garden

George Valentine Nash (May 6, 1864 – July 15, 1921) was an American botanist. He was the Head Gardener and Curator of the Plantations at the New York Botanical Garden, for whom he did field work in the Bahamas, South Florida and Haiti.

== Life ==
=== Early life and family background ===
George Valentine Nash was born in Brooklyn, New York on May 6, 1864. He was the son of Scotto Clark Nash and Alice Valentine, who were married in Brooklyn, NY on February 2, 1863. Scotto was the son of Rev. John Adams and Mary Moody (Clark) Nash, whose ancestry is traced back to Pilgrim William Brewster, who came from England on the Mayflower in 1620. Scotto and Alice also had a daughter, Mary Clark Nash.

Scotto, after many years as a businessman in various capacities, pursued an interest in nature by building greenhouses and growing roses. In particular, he grew the American Beauty Rose, imported from England in 1882. Assisted by George, Scotto was listed in a local Clifton, NJ directory as a "florist". Scotto also had an exhibit of cut roses at the 1893 World's Fair in Chicago.

Nash added in many ways to the initial botanical training provided by his father. Starting about 1888, he made the acquaintance of botanist and collector Dr. George Thurber, editor of the American Agriculturalist, who specialized in grasses. Nash picked up this same interest and eventually received a large part of Thurber's grass herbarium. Nash also studied the wild plants of New Jersey and joined the Torrey Botanical Club in 1891, where he met botanist Nathanial Lord Britton, who co-founded the New York Botanical Garden (NYBG). In 1894-96 Nash helped collect botanical specimens in central Florida and studied them at Columbia College. In 1895, he issued the exsiccata-like series Plants of Florida. In addition, he studied botany with Britton.

=== Later life and career ===
Nash first became employed by the New York Botanical Garden in 1896, during its preliminary organizational phase. Beginning in 1900, he was promoted to Curator of the Plantations; then in 1901 he became Head Gardener. That same year, the NYBG was invited by Sir William Thiselton-Dyer, Director of the Royal Botanic Gardens in Kew, England, to visit and acquire plant species to transplant for their initial collections. Nash went on the trip. The accession he selected included over 1000 species.

Nash went on several other collecting and plant-exchanging trips. In late 1901, he and Dr. John K. Small connected over 1200 specimens of living plants in Florida. In 1902, Nash made a second European trip for further study and to exchange plants with several other institutions, including a return visit to Kew, and others in Edinburgh, Cambridge, Brussels, Paris, and Utrecht. Between 1903 and 1905, Nash made collecting expeditions to many islands in the Caribbean.

Starting in 1906, Nash remained at the NYBG, supervising the creation and maintenance of the gardens, developing and cataloging the institution's plant collections, giving public lectures and demonstrations, and replying to inquiries about plants.

Starting in 1909, Nash was Secretary of the Horticultural Society of New York. He edited its journal for a while, and helped with exhibitions.

== Selected publications ==
Nash is the author of over 180 publications on the topic of botany and horticulture, including his annual reports, published yearly in the NYBG Bulletin. His works on diverse botanical topics include: Costa Rican Orchids (1906), North American Flora (1909), A revision of the family Fouquieriaceae (1906?), and A preliminary enumeration of the grasses of Porto Rico (1903).

In 1916, he became one of the two founding editors of the Garden's new botanical journal Addisonia, along with John Hendley Barnhart.

== Miscellaneous ==
- Nash Park in Clifton, New Jersey is named after him and his family.
- The genus Nashia, of the Verbena family, was named after Nash by Charles Frederick Millspaugh.
- Nash is credited with the discovery of several species of West Indian and Floridian plants.
