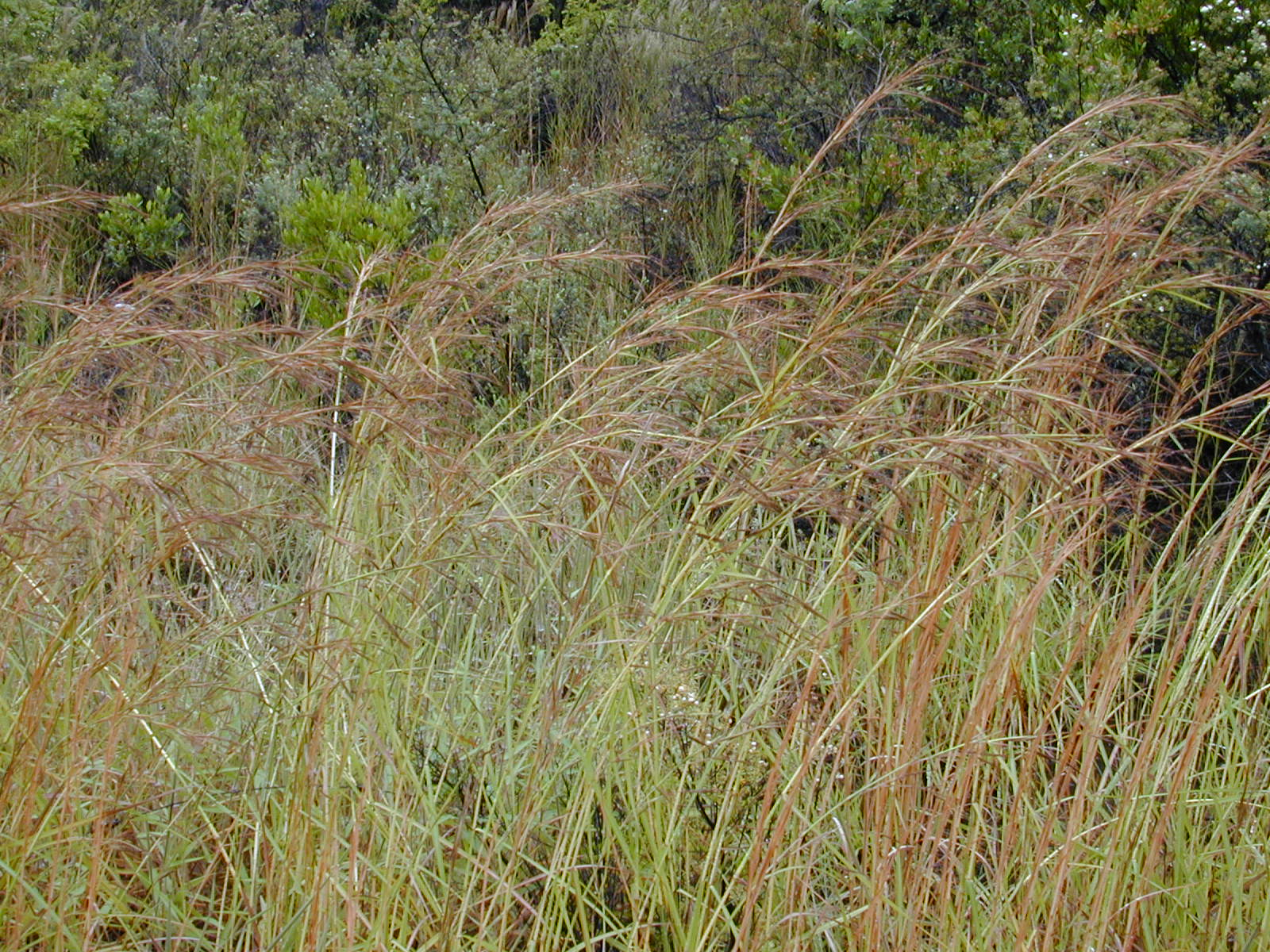
- Hyparrhenia rufa

Scientific classification
- Kingdom: Plantae
- Clade: Tracheophytes
- Clade: Angiosperms
- Clade: Monocots
- Clade: Commelinids
- Order: Poales
- Family: Poaceae
- Subfamily: Panicoideae
- Supertribe: Andropogonodae
- Tribe: Andropogoneae
- Subtribe: Andropogoninae
- Genus: Hyparrhenia; Andersson ex Fourn.

Type species
- Hyparrhenia foliosa (Kunth) Andersson ex Fourn.

Synonyms
- Dybowskia Stapf

= Hyparrhenia =

Thatching grass

Genus of grasses

Hyparrhenia is a genus of grasses. Many species are known commonly as thatching grass.

They are mostly native to tropical Africa; some can be found in warmer areas in temperate Eurasia, Australia, and Latin America. These are annual and perennial bunch grasses. The inflorescence branches into twin spikes of paired spikelets.

Species

- Hyparrhenia anamesa - dry Africa from Ethiopia to Cape Province
- Hyparrhenia andongensis - Angola
- Hyparrhenia anemopaegma - Zambia
- Hyparrhenia anthistirioides - dry Africa from Eritrea to Malawi
- Hyparrhenia arrhenobasis - Ethiopia
- Hyparrhenia bagirmica - West Africa
- Hyparrhenia barteri - from Burkina Faso to Malawi
- Hyparrhenia bracteata - Africa (from Mali to Zimbabwe), Thailand, Vietnam, New Guinea, Latin America (from Veracruz to Paraná)
- Hyparrhenia claytonii - Ethiopia
- Hyparrhenia coleotricha - Eritrea, Ethiopia, Sudan, Tanzania, Yemen
- Hyparrhenia collina - dry Africa from Nigeria to Ethiopia to KwaZulu-Natal
- Hyparrhenia confinis - tropical Africa from Zaïre to Ethiopia
- Hyparrhenia coriacea - Central African Rep
- Hyparrhenia cyanescens from Gambia to Zaïre
- Hyparrhenia cymbaria - Africa, Madagascar, Comoros, India
- Hyparrhenia dichroa - from Djibouti to KwaZulu-Natal
- Hyparrhenia diplandra - tropical Africa, southern China, Thailand, Vietnam, Sulawesi
- Hyparrhenia dregeana - from Yemen and Eritrea to Eswatini
- Hyparrhenia dybowskii - Zaïre, Central African Rep
- Hyparrhenia exarmata - from Mali to Kenya
- Hyparrhenia familiaris - from Guinea to Angola
- Hyparrhenia figariana - from Nigeria to Tanzania
- Hyparrhenia filipendula - from Guinea to KwaZulu-Natal; Madagascar, Yunnan, Sri Lanka, Philippines, New Guinea, Queensland, New South Wales
- Hyparrhenia finitima - from Sierra Leone to Mpumalanga
- Hyparrhenia formosa - from Ethiopia + Yemen to Malawi
- Hyparrhenia gazensis - from Uganda to KwaZulu-Natal
- Hyparrhenia glabriuscula - tropical Africa
- Hyparrhenia gossweileri - Zaïre, Tanzania, Angola, Zambia
- Hyparrhenia griffithii - Sudan, Kenya, Tanzania, Zambia, Madagascar, Yunnan, Assam, Myanmar, Vietnam
- Hyparrhenia hirta - Africa, southern Europe, southwest Asia from France to Cape Province to Pakistan; naturalized in scattered sites in Australia, North + South America
- Hyparrhenia involucrata - from Burkina Faso to Congo Rep
- Hyparrhenia madaropoda - from South Sudan to Mozambique
- Hyparrhenia mobukensis - from Ethiopia to Malawi
- Hyparrhenia multiplex - Ethiopia + Sudan
- Hyparrhenia neglecta - Ethiopia
- Hyparrhenia newtonii - Africa (from Guinea to Eswatini), Madagascar, China, Southeast Asia, New Guinea
- Hyparrhenia niariensis - from Cameroon to Zambia
- Hyparrhenia nyassae - tropical Africa, Madagascar, Thailand, Vietnam
- Hyparrhenia papillipes - Ethiopia, Kenya, Uganda, Yemen, Tanzania, Madagascar
- Hyparrhenia pilgeriana - from Ethiopia to KwaZulu-Natal
- Hyparrhenia pilosa - Central African Rep
- Hyparrhenia poecilotricha - from Guinea to KwaZulu-Natal
- Hyparrhenia praetermissa - Sulawesi
- Hyparrhenia quarrei - from Yemen to Nigeria + KwaZulu-Natal
- Hyparrhenia rudis - tropical Africa, Madagascar
- Hyparrhenia rufa - tropical - southern Africa; Yunnan, Myanmar, Thailand; naturalized in Florida, Texas, Latin America (from Chihuahua to Paraguay); various islands in Caribbean, Pacific, Indian Ocean
- Hyparrhenia schimperi - from Ethiopia to Cape Province; Madagascar
- Hyparrhenia smithiana - from Guinea to Congo Rep
- Hyparrhenia subplumosa - from Guinea to Zimbabwe
- Hyparrhenia tamba - from Eritrea to Lesotho
- Hyparrhenia tuberculata - Ethiopia
- Hyparrhenia umbrosa - from Nigeria to KwaZulu-Natal; Comoros
- Hyparrhenia variabilis - from Yemen + Eritrea to KwaZulu-Natal; Comoros, Madagascar
- Hyparrhenia violascens - Burkina Faso, Nigeria, Chad, Cameroon
- Hyparrhenia welwitschii - from Guinea to Zimbabwe; Comoros
- Hyparrhenia wombaliensis - Cameroon, Congo Rep, Zaïre

formerly included

see Andropogon Elymandra Exotheca Hyperthelia Parahyparrhenia

- Hyparrhenia abyssinica - Exotheca abyssinica
- Hyparrhenia archaelymandra - Elymandra archaelymandra
- Hyparrhenia baddadae - Elymandra grallata
- Hyparrhenia cornucopiae - Hyperthelia cornucopiae
- Hyparrhenia dissoluta - Hyperthelia dissoluta
- Hyparrhenia djalonica - Parahyparrhenia annua
- Hyparrhenia edulis - Hyperthelia edulis
- Hyparrhenia eylesii - Elymandra grallata
- Hyparrhenia grallata - Elymandra grallata
- Hyparrhenia jaegeriana - Parahyparrhenia annua
- Hyparrhenia lithophila - Elymandra lithophila
- Hyparrhenia macrolepis - Hyperthelia dissoluta
- Hyparrhenia monathera - Exotheca abyssinica
- Hyparrhenia pusilla - Andropogon pusillus
- Hyparrhenia sulcata - Parahyparrhenia annua
