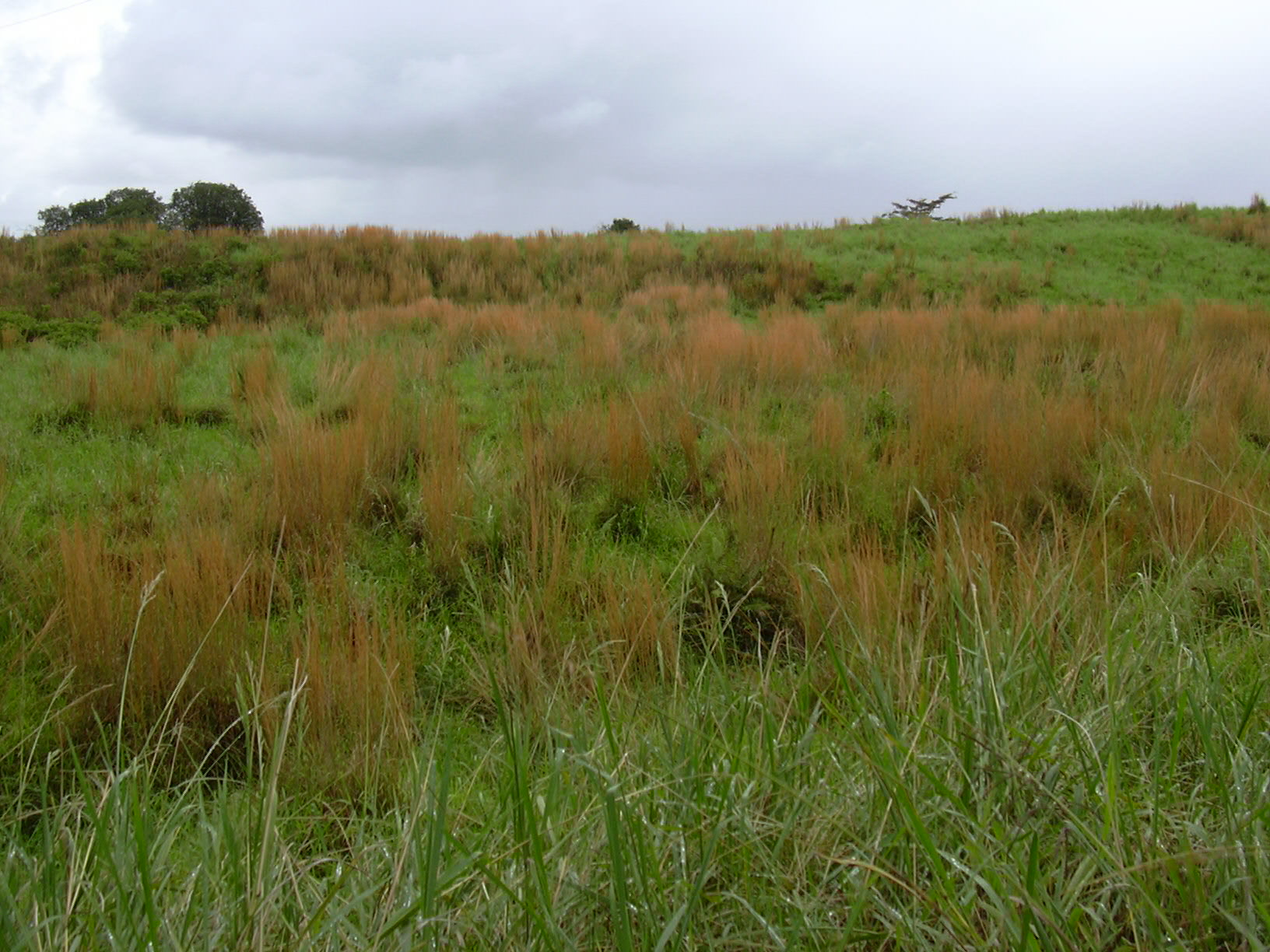
- Andropogon virginicus

Scientific classification
- Kingdom: Plantae
- Clade: Tracheophytes
- Clade: Angiosperms
- Clade: Monocots
- Clade: Commelinids
- Order: Poales
- Family: Poaceae
- Subfamily: Panicoideae
- Supertribe: Andropogonodae
- Tribe: Andropogoneae
- Subtribe: Andropogoninae
- Genus: Andropogon; L.

Type species
- Andropogon distachyos L.

Synonyms
- Anatherum P.Beauv.; Arthrostachys Desv.; Dimeiostemon Raf.; Eupogon Desv.; Eriopodium Hochst.; Euklastaxon Steud.; Heterochloa Desv.; Homoeatherum Nees; Hypogynium Nees; Leptopogon Roberty

= Andropogon =

Genus of grasses

Andropogon (common names: beard grass, bluestem grass, broomsedge) is a widespread genus of plants in the grass family, native to much of Asia, Africa, and the Americas, as well as Southern Europe and various oceanic islands.

Over 100 species have been described.

== Species ==
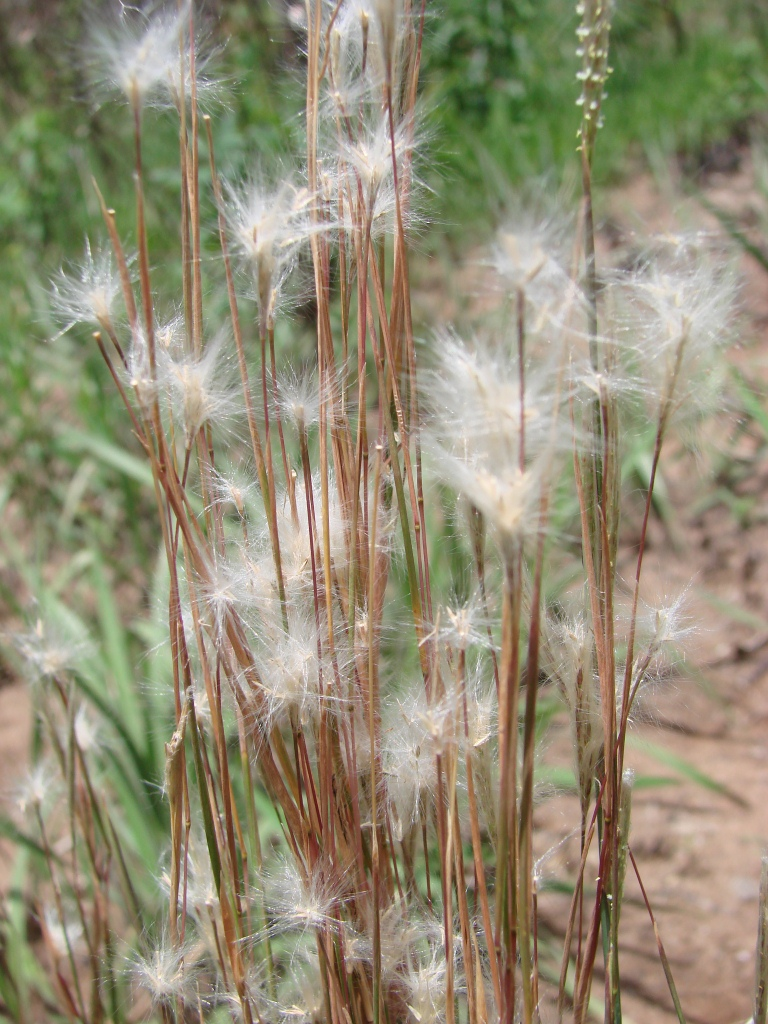
Andropogon leucostachyus

- Andropogon abyssinicus
- Andropogon aciculatus
- Andropogon aequatoriensis
- Andropogon amboinicus
- Andropogon amethystinus
- Andropogon appendiculatus
- Andropogon arctatus
- Andropogon benthamianus
- Andropogon bentii
- Andropogon bicornis
- Andropogon brachystachyus
- Andropogon campestris
- Andropogon campii
- Andropogon canaliculatus
- Andropogon capillipes
- Andropogon chinensis
- Andropogon chrysostachyus
- Andropogon consanguineus
- Andropogon cordatus
- Andropogon distachyos
- Andropogon eucomus
- Andropogon fastigiatus
- Andropogon floridanus
- Andropogon fragilis
- Andropogon gabonensis
- Andropogon gayanus – gamba grass, tambuki grass
- Andropogon gerardi – big bluestem
- Andropogon glaucopsis
- Andropogon glomeratus – bushy bluestem
- Andropogon gracilis
- Andropogon gyrans
- Andropogon hallii
- Andropogon huillensis
- Andropogon ingratus
- Andropogon inermis
- Andropogon ischaemum
- Andropogon kelleri
- Andropogon lanuginosus
- Andropogon lateralis
- Andropogon lawsonii
- Andropogon leucostachyus
- Andropogon liebmannii
- Andropogon lividus
- Andropogon longiberbis
- Andropogon minarum
- Andropogon mohrii
- Andropogon murinus
- Andropogon paniculatus
- Andropogon pseudapricus
- Andropogon pumilus
- Andropogon scabriglumis
- Andropogon schirensis
- Andropogon schottii
- Andropogon selloanus
- Andropogon shimadae
- Andropogon tectorum
- Andropogon tenuiberbis
- Andropogon ternarius – split bluestem
- Andropogon ternatus
- Andropogon thorelii
- Andropogon tracyi
- Andropogon virgatus
- Andropogon virginicus – broomsedge bluestem, whiskeygrass
- Andropogon yunnanensis

Many species once included in Andropogon are now regarded as better suited to other genera, including Agenium, Anadelphia, Apluda, Arthraxon, Bothriochloa, Capeochloa, Capillipedium, Chrysopogon, Cymbopogon, Dichanthium, Diheteropogon, Elionurus, Elymandra, Eragrostis, Eulalia, Garnotia, Gymnopogon, Hemarthria, Heteropogon, Hyparrhenia, Hyperthelia, Ischaemum, Parahyparrhenia, Pentameris, Polytrias, Pseudopogonatherum, Pseudosorghum, Saccharum, Schizachyrium, Sorghastrum, Sorghum, Spodiopogon, Themeda, and Trachypogon.

== See also ==
- List of Poaceae genera
