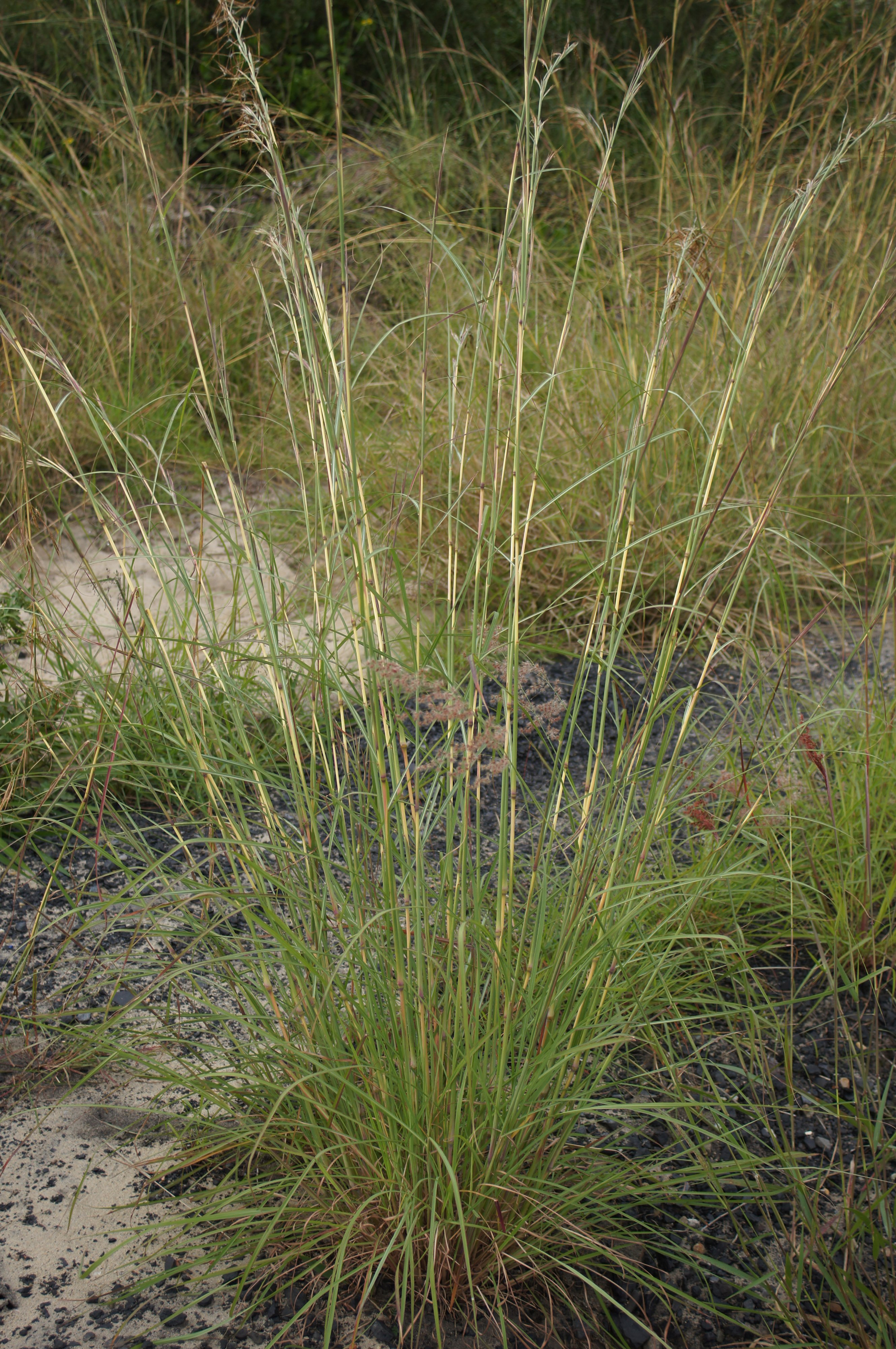

Scientific classification
- Kingdom: Plantae
- Clade: Tracheophytes
- Clade: Angiosperms
- Clade: Monocots
- Clade: Commelinids
- Order: Poales
- Family: Poaceae
- Subfamily: Panicoideae
- Genus: Hyparrhenia
- Species: H. rufa

Binomial name
- Hyparrhenia rufa (Nees) Stapf

Synonyms
- Synonyms: Andropogon altissimus; Andropogon bonangensis; Andropogon bouangensis; Andropogon fulvicomus; Andropogon hirtus; Andropogon rufus; Andropogon xanthoblepharis; Andropogon yinduensis; Cymbopogon rufus; Hyparrhenia altissima; Hyparrhenia fulvicoma; Hyparrhenia parvispiculata; Hyparrhenia yunnanensis; Sorghum rufum; Sorghum xanthoblepharis; Trachypogon rufus

= Hyparrhenia rufa =

Species of plant

Hyparrhenia rufa is a species of grass known by the common names jaraguá, jaraguá grass, and giant thatching grass. It is native to Africa and it is widespread in the world as a cultivated forage and fodder for livestock and a naturalized and sometimes invasive species.

== Description ==
This is usually a perennial grass, but it sometimes grows as an annual, and it is variable in form. It usually forms dense tufts of stems from a short rhizome. The stems can be 30 centimeters to 3.5 meters tall. The leaf sheaths enclose the stem at intervals, making it appear banded. Flowering stems have sparse leaves, but grazing increases leaf production. The leaf blades are 30 to 60 centimeters long. The panicle is up to 80 centimeters long and is made up of many short, yellowish or red-tinged racemes all subtended by a narrow, reddish spathe a few centimeters long. The racemes are lined with pairs of spikelets, the red-haired fertile spikelets without stalks and the smaller sterile spikelets on stalks.

The rough-haired seeds are dispersed in the fur of animals, on the wind, and on vehicles and machinery such as graders.

== Ecology ==
In its native range the grass grows in woodlands and seasonally flooded grasslands. It is also tolerant of drought and easily naturalizes in disturbed habitat sites.

Several species of leafcutter ants have been observed foraging on jaragua, including Atta capiguara and A. laevigata.

The grass is susceptible to the plant pathogenic nematodes Helicotylenchus pseudopaxilli, Pratylenchus brachyurus, and Longidorus laevicapitatus. It can also host the phytoplasma bacterium which causes stunting in Napier grass (Pennisetum purpureum), and its infection has been dubbed Hyparrhenia grass white leaf disease.

== Feed ==
This grass is grown in pastures for grazing and is cut for fodder, including hay and silage. It is often used for grazing beef cattle, and it is also used to raise dairy cattle, sheep, and goats. It is not a very nutritious grass, so it is generally supplemented with legumes for nitrogen and molasses, citrus pulp, or bran for energy. One experimental supplement for goats is a mix of groundnut cake and wheat bran. Legumes that have been added as supplements include Cratylia argentea, Erythrina poeppigiana, Gliricidia sepium, and Leucaena leucocephala. The protein content and digestibility of the grass are lowest in the dry season.

== As a weed ==
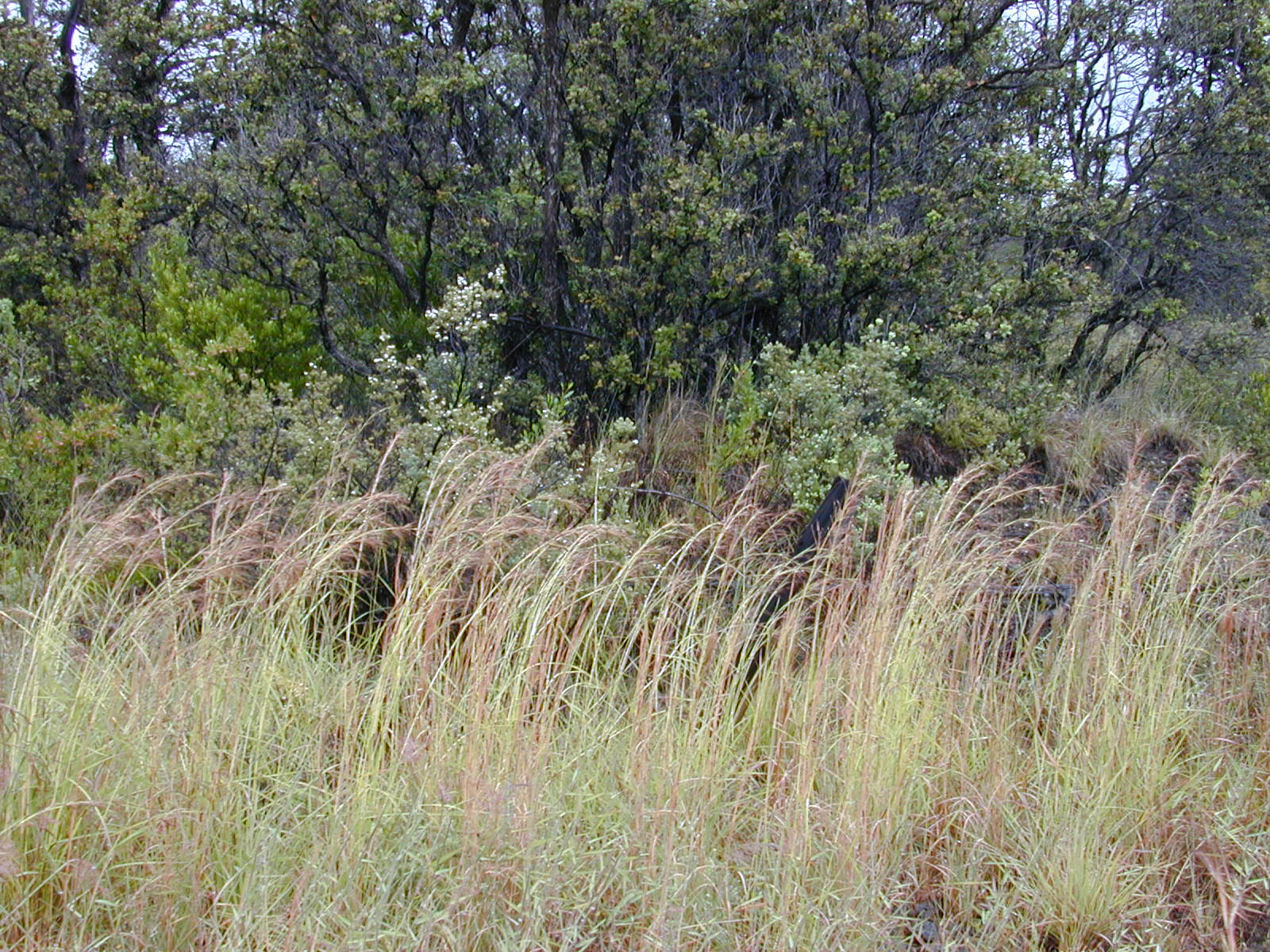
As a weed in Hawaii

Where it has been introduced into cultivation it has frequently taken hold in the local habitat, sometimes becoming an invasive component of the flora. On the Llanos of South America it has grown easily on the moist grasslands that resemble those of its original range. It was introduced to the region to feed animals because native grasses are more fibrous and less nutritious. Its ability to outcompete native grasses such as Trachypogon plumosus is thought to come from several factors, which may include higher rate of growth, photosynthesis and germination of seeds, more efficient use of water, and more resources channeled into leaf development. It better tolerates loss of foliage to herbivores. It commonly reproduces vegetatively, but it also produces large amounts of highly viable seed.

This grass is a pyrophyte, well adapted to habitat with an annual wildfire cycle. During the dry season it becomes very flammable. Wildfires in stands of native grasses are patchy and relatively limited. H. rufa forms dense monotypic stands of tall stems in the absence of grazing pressure, and these stands ignite easily, burn intensely, and spread fire into the surrounding forests. Not only does the grass make wildfire events more severe, but it increases in response to fire. Dry parts may be burned away, but living tissue near the ground is not harmed and resprouts immediately; fire damage to an established stand of the grass is "negligible".

Today this species occurs as a weed in most tropical regions. It can be found in North, Central, and South America, many Pacific Islands, Asia, parts of Africa outside its native range, and Australia.

== Other uses ==
This tall grass can be used as thatching, as straw, and as pulp for making paper. In East Africa it is planted as a border grass to prevent erosion.
