= Anatherum =

Scientific classification
- Kingdom: Plantae
- Clade: Tracheophytes
- Clade: Angiosperms
- Clade: Monocots
- Clade: Commelinids
- Order: Poales
- Family: Poaceae
- Subfamily: Panicoideae
- Supertribe: Andropogonodae
- Tribe: Andropogoneae
- Genus: Anatherum; P.Beauv.

Genus of grasses

Anatherum is a genus of grasses. It includes 51 species native to temperate and tropical North America, tropical South America, and sub-Saharan Africa.

The genus was first described by Palisot de Beauvois in 1812. Later authorities synonymized the genus with Andropogon. Phylogenetic studies revealed Andropogon to be polyphyletic, and Vorontsova et al. revived and re-circumscribed Anatherum in 2023.

== Species ==
51 species are accepted.

- Anatherum aequatoriensis ((Hitchc.) Voronts. & E.A.Kellogg
- Anatherum africanum (Franch.) Roberty
- Anatherum arctatum (Chapm.) Voronts. & E.A.Kellogg
- Anatherum arenarium (Hack.) Voronts. & E.A.Kellogg
- Anatherum barretoi (Norrmann & Quarín) Voronts. & E.A.Kellogg
- Anatherum bicorne (L.) P.Beauv.
- Anatherum bourgaei (Hack.) Roberty
- Anatherum brachystachyum (Chapm.) Roberty
- Anatherum brasiliense (A.Zanin & Longhi-Wagner) Voronts. & E.A.Kellogg
- Anatherum cabanisii (Hack.) Voronts. & E.A.Kellogg
- Anatherum campbellii (U.B.Deshmukh, M.B.Shende & E.S.Reddy) E.L.Bridges & Orzell
- Anatherum capillipes (Nash) Voronts. & E.A.Kellogg
- Anatherum cordatum (Swallen) Voronts. & E.A.Kellogg
- Anatherum cretaceum (Weakley & Schori) Weakley & Schori
- Anatherum cumulicola (E.L.Bridges & Orzell) Voronts. & E.A.Kellogg
- Anatherum curvifolium (Clayton) Voronts. & E.A.Kellogg
- Anatherum dealbatum (C.Mohr ex Hack.) Weakley & LeBlond
- Anatherum eremicum (Wipff & R.B.Shaw) Weakley & Wipff
- Anatherum eucomum (Nees) Voronts. & E.A.Kellogg
- Anatherum floridanum (Scribn.) Voronts. & E.A.Kellogg
- Anatherum glaucescens (Kunth) Voronts. & E.A.Kellogg
- Anatherum glaucophyllum (Roseng., B.R.Arrill. & Izag.) Voronts. & E.A.Kellogg
- Anatherum glaziovii (Hack.) Voronts. & E.A.Kellogg
- Anatherum glomeratum (Walter) Voronts. & E.A.Kellogg
- Anatherum gyrans (Ashe) Voronts. & E.A.Kellogg
- Anatherum hirsutius (Hack.) Weakley & LeBlond
- Anatherum ibityense (A.Camus) Voronts. & E.A.Kellogg
- Anatherum imerinense (Bosser) Voronts. & E.A.Kellogg
- Anatherum insolitum (Sohns) Voronts. & E.A.Kellogg
- Anatherum ivohibense (A.Camus) Voronts. & E.A.Kellogg
- Anatherum laterale (Nees) Voronts. & E.A.Kellogg
- Anatherum laxatum (Stapf) Voronts. & E.A.Kellogg
- Anatherum lehmannii (Pilg.) Voronts. & E.A.Kellogg
- Anatherum leucostachyum (Kunth) Voronts. & E.A.Kellogg
- Anatherum liebmannii (Hack.) Voronts. & E.A.Kellogg
- Anatherum ligulatum (Stapf) Voronts. & E.A.Kellogg
- Anatherum × lindmanii (Hack.) Voronts. & E.A.Kellogg
- Anatherum longiberbe (Hack.) Voronts. & E.A.Kellogg
- Anatherum macrothrix (Trin.) Voronts. & E.A.Kellogg
- Anatherum miamiense (E.L.Bridges & Orzell) Voronts. & E.A.Kellogg
- Anatherum mohrii (Hack.) Voronts. & E.A.Kellogg
- Anatherum multiflorum (Renvoize) Voronts. & E.A.Kellogg
- Anatherum perangustatum (Nash) Voronts. & E.A.Kellogg
- Anatherum pringlei (Scribn. & Merr.) Voronts. & E.A.Kellogg
- Anatherum selloanum (Hack.) Voronts. & E.A.Kellogg
- Anatherum subtile (Budach & E.L.Bridges
- Anatherum tenuispatheum (Nash) Sorrie & Weakley
- Anatherum ternarium (Michx.) Voronts. & E.A.Kellogg
- Anatherum tracyi (Nash) Voronts. & E.A.Kellogg
- Anatherum trichozygum (Baker) Voronts. & E.A.Kellogg
- Anatherum urbanianum (Hitchc.) Voronts. & E.A.Kellogg
- Anatherum virginicum (L.) Spreng.
