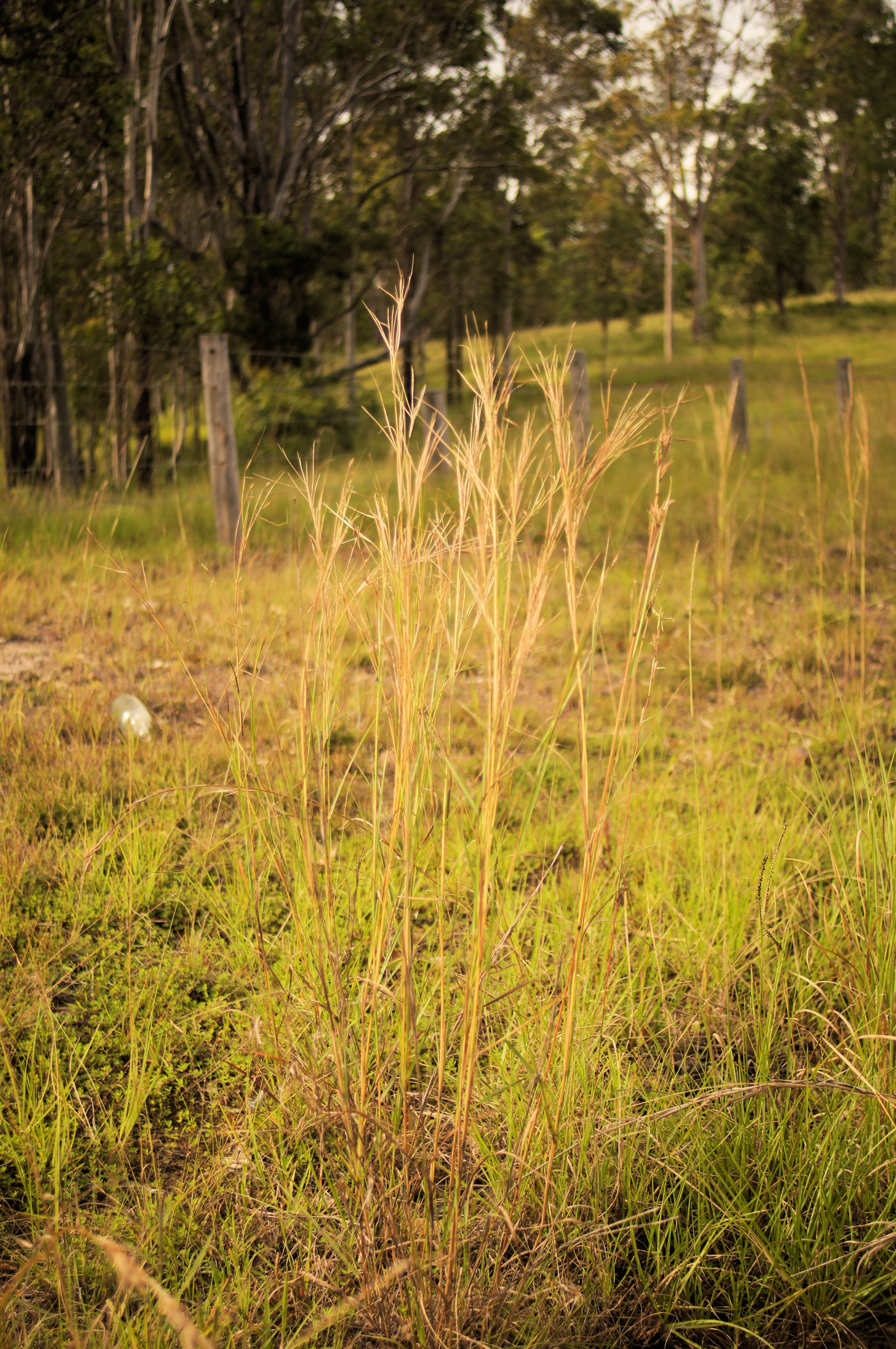
- New South Wales, Australia

Scientific classification
- Kingdom: Plantae
- Clade: Tracheophytes
- Clade: Angiosperms
- Clade: Monocots
- Clade: Commelinids
- Order: Poales
- Family: Poaceae
- Subfamily: Panicoideae
- Genus: Hyparrhenia
- Species: H. filipendula

Binomial name
- Hyparrhenia filipendula (Hochst.) Stapf

Synonyms
- Andropogon filipendulus Hochst.; Cymbopogon filipendulus (Hochst.) Rendle; Sorghum filipendulum (Hochst.) Kuntze

= Hyparrhenia filipendula =

Species of grass

Hyparrhenia filipendula is a species of perennial bunchgrass commonly known as Tambookie grass, fine thatching grass, and fine hood grass. It grows to a height of 1 to 1.5 metres (3.3 to 4.9 ft).

== Distribution ==
Hyparrhenia filipendula has a widespread native distribution, in semiarid Africa, Papuasia and Australia. It has been introduced into Sri Lanka, parts of Southeast Asia and Indonesia. It is an important component of acacia savannas with 900–1,000 millimetres (35–39 in) of annual precipitation in East Africa, which includes the wetter parts of the Serengeti ecosystem. It is commonly found in grasslands in combination with Themeda triandra and Hyparrhenia dissoluta.

== Uses ==
Hyparrhenia filipendula is a fodder plant for wild and domestic grazers, but it is not well adapted to heavy grazing. In mixed grasslands with T. tiandra, it produces 6.8 grams of dry matter and 0.56 grams of protein per square meter per month per centimeter of rainfall.
