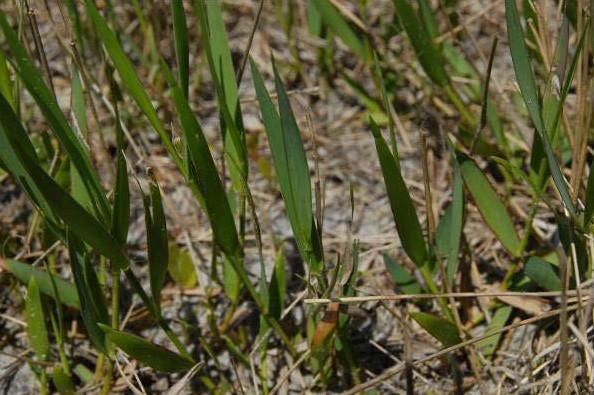

Conservation status
- Apparently Secure (NatureServe)

Scientific classification
- Kingdom: Plantae
- Clade: Tracheophytes
- Clade: Angiosperms
- Clade: Monocots
- Clade: Commelinids
- Order: Poales
- Family: Poaceae
- Subfamily: Panicoideae
- Genus: Amphicarpum
- Species: A. muehlenbergianum

Binomial name
- Amphicarpum muehlenbergianum (Schult.) Hitchc.

= Amphicarpum muehlenbergianum =

Species of flowering plant

Amphicarpum muehlenbergianum (or A. muhlenbergianum) is a species of grass known by the common names blue maidencane, Muhlenberg maidencane, and goobergrass. It is native to the southeastern United States.

This perennial grass has decumbent stems that spread along the ground and root where stem nodes come in contact with the substrate. It grows from a rhizome. The stems may reach a meter in length. The leaves are evenly distributed along the stem. The firm, blue-green leaf blades are up to 10 centimeters long by 1 centimeter wide, and are lance-shaped, widest distal to the bases. The leaf blade margins are cartilaginous, becoming white in color when dry. The plant has open flowers on the stem inflorescence and cleistogamous, unopening flowers which grow underground on white, self-pollinating spikelets.

In its natural habitat this species grows in pine woods and savannas, as well as wetlands. It can grow in shallow pools and on shorelines. It does not grow in deeper, stagnant water bodies. It has a thick rhizomatous root network that is good for resisting erosion in wet areas, so it can be used in wetland restoration projects. It is tolerant of some shade. Associated wild plants include creeping bluestem (Schizachyrium scoparium), broomsedge bluestem (Andropogon virginicus) in flatwoods habitat, as well as wiregrass (Aristida stricta), switchgrass (Panicum virgatum), bottlebrush threeawn (Aristida spiciformis), hairy blustem (Andropogon longiberbis), and bluejoint panicum (Panicum tenerum).

The grass also makes a good forage for cattle and wild ungulates. It may produce 4000 pounds per acre of palatable forage.
