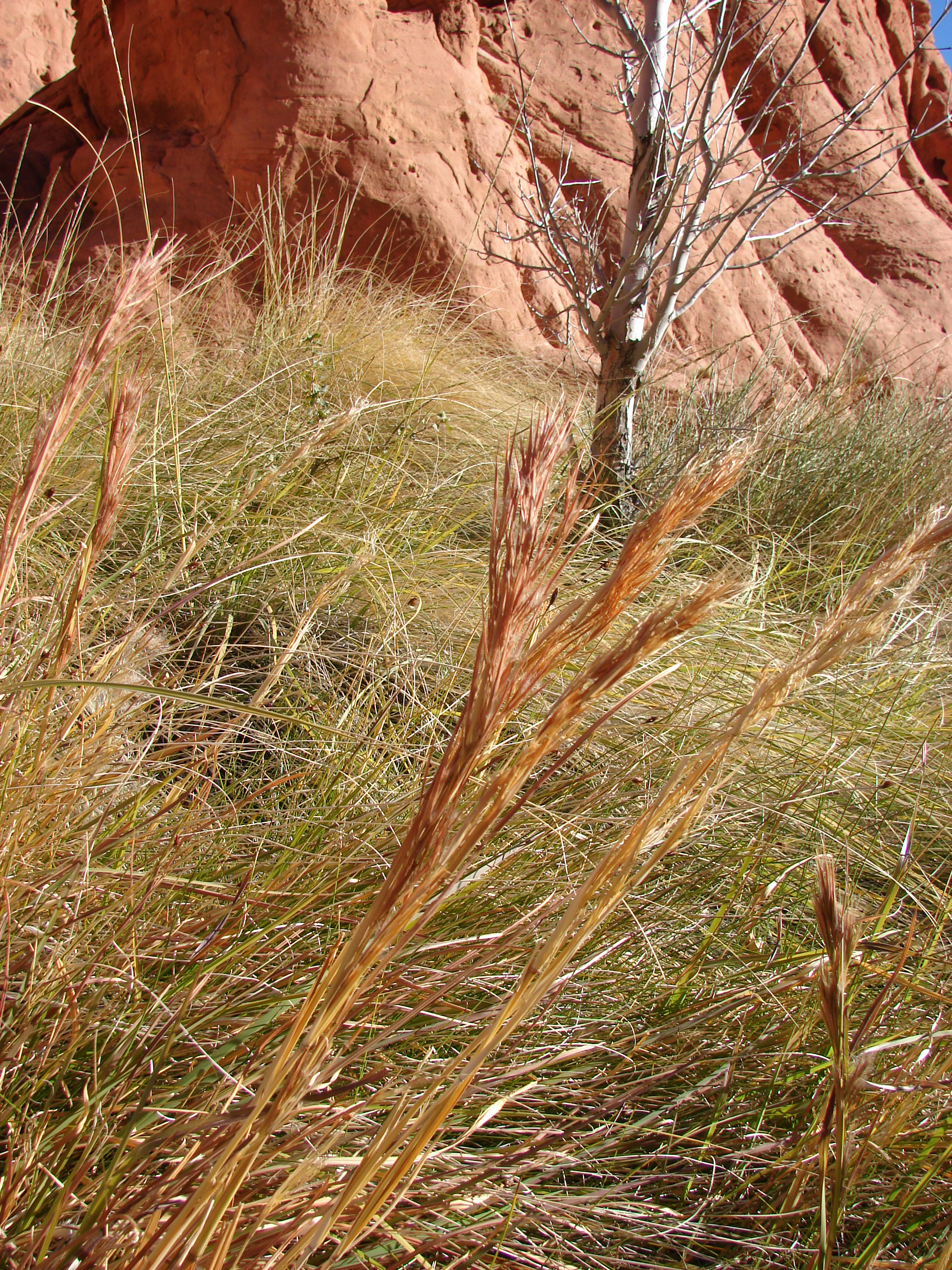

Conservation status
- Secure (NatureServe)

Scientific classification
- Kingdom: Plantae
- Clade: Tracheophytes
- Clade: Angiosperms
- Clade: Monocots
- Clade: Commelinids
- Order: Poales
- Family: Poaceae
- Subfamily: Panicoideae
- Genus: Andropogon
- Species: A. glomeratus

Binomial name
- Andropogon glomeratus (Walt.) Britton, Sterns & Poggenb.

Synonyms
- Andropogon marcrourus Michx.

= Andropogon glomeratus =

Species of plant

Andropogon glomeratus is a species of grass known by the common names bushy bluestem and bushy beardgrass. This bunchgrass is native to the Americas, where it is widespread. It has also naturalized in other areas.

The genus name Andropogon comes from the Greek words 'aner' or 'andros' meaning "man" and 'pogon' meaning "beard", in reference to the hairs on the spikelets of certain species in this genus. The specific epithet glomeratus means "bunched", in reference to the species' bushy and broom-like inflorescences.

== Description ==
This grass reaches heights approaching two meters (6 feet) and has large, fluffy cream-colored inflorescences. Each dense, tufted inflorescence has several pairs of hairy spikelets. The leaves may reach over a meter in length and are typically blue-green in the summer and coppery-red in the fall.

== Cultivation ==
This plant does best in moist soils, and is found naturally in areas such as swamps, wet savannas, pine flatwoods, bogs, and fens. It prefers full sun, and is best suited to USDA hardiness zones 5–9.

== Uses ==
It is cultivated as an ornamental grass. This species also has potential as a noxious weed and is easily spread via seed contamination. It has been declared a weed in Puerto Rico and a potentially invasive weed in Mexico.

The seeds are eaten by songbirds and small mammals, while the larvae of certain butterflies feed on the plant.
