= Andropogon bentii =

Conservation status
- Endangered (IUCN 3.1)

Scientific classification
- Kingdom: Plantae
- Clade: Tracheophytes
- Clade: Angiosperms
- Clade: Monocots
- Clade: Commelinids
- Order: Poales
- Family: Poaceae
- Subfamily: Panicoideae
- Genus: Andropogon
- Species: A. bentii

Binomial name
- Andropogon bentii Stapf

Species of grass

Andropogon bentii is a species of grass in the family Poaceae. It is found only in the Socotra archipelago in the Indian Ocean, a part of Yemen. Its natural habitat is succulent and dwarf shrubland on limestone escarpments and plateaus. It takes its name from its collector (1897), the British explorer Theodore Bent.
