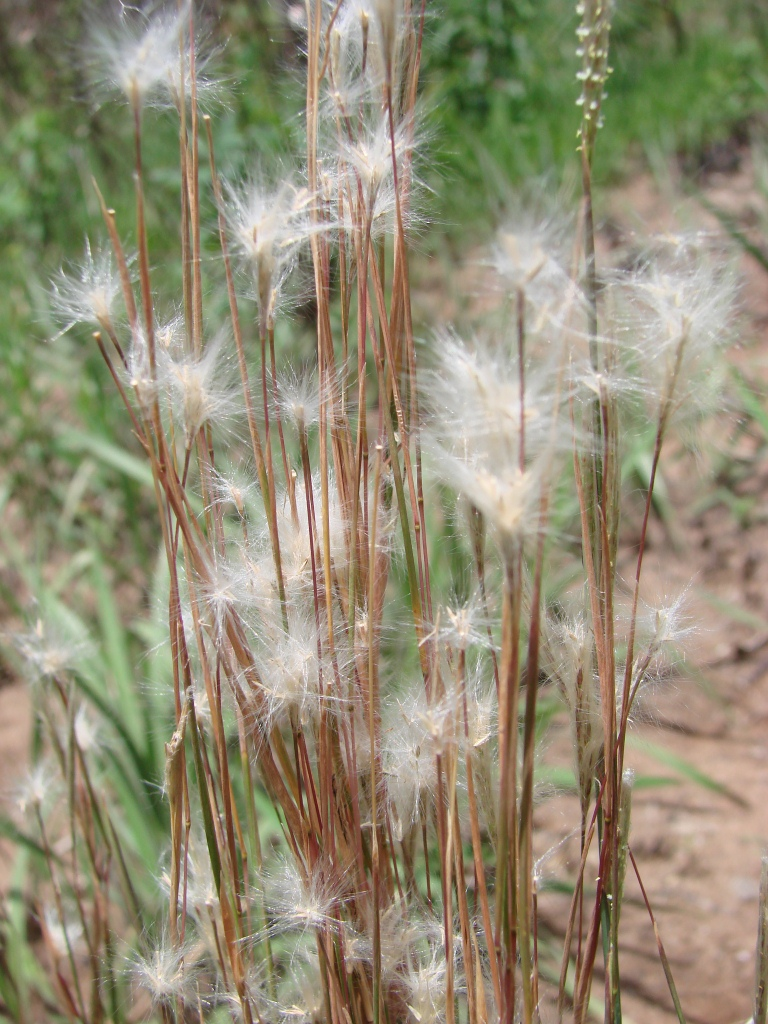

Scientific classification
- Kingdom: Plantae
- Clade: Tracheophytes
- Clade: Angiosperms
- Clade: Monocots
- Clade: Commelinids
- Order: Poales
- Family: Poaceae
- Subfamily: Panicoideae
- Genus: Andropogon
- Species: A. leucostachyus

Binomial name
- Andropogon leucostachyus Kunth

Synonyms
- Anatherum virginicum subvar. Leucostachyum (Kunth) Roberty; Andropogon leucostachyus subvar. Typicus Hack.; Andropogon virginicus subsp. Leucostachyus (Kunth) Hack.; Sorghum leucostachyum (Kunth) Kuntze; Anatherum brasiliense Spreng. ex Steud.; Anatherum domingense Roem. & Schult.; Andropogon dianae Steud.; Andropogon lanuginosus Kunth; Andropogon leucostachyus subvar. Mas Hack.; Andropogon leucostachyus subvar. Subvillosus Hack.; Andropogon pennatus Willd. ex Steud.; Saccharum fasciculatum Willd. ex Steud.; Andropogon domingensis (Roem. & Schult.) Steud. (Ambiguous); Andropogon virginicus Trin. (objectively invalid) (Ambiguous)

= Andropogon leucostachyus =

Species of grass

Andropogon leucostachyus is a species of grass in the family Poaceae. It is native from Mexico to South America.
