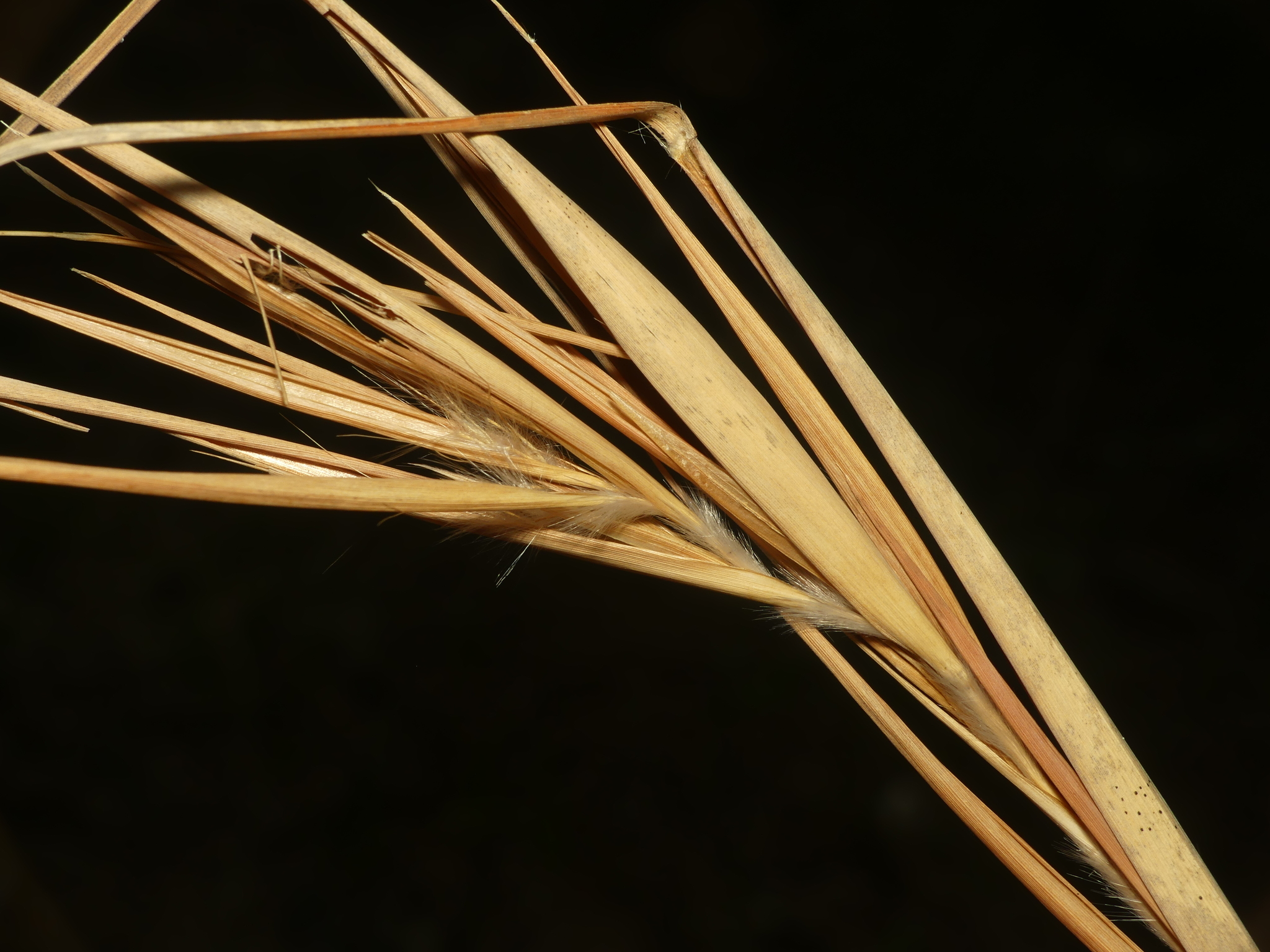

Conservation status
- Secure (NatureServe)

Scientific classification
- Kingdom: Plantae
- Clade: Tracheophytes
- Clade: Angiosperms
- Clade: Monocots
- Clade: Commelinids
- Order: Poales
- Family: Poaceae
- Subfamily: Panicoideae
- Genus: Andropogon
- Species: A. gyrans

Binomial name
- Andropogon gyrans Ashe

Synonyms
- Andropogon elliottii; Panicum gyrans

= Andropogon gyrans =

Species of plant

Andropogon gyrans is a species of grass known as Elliott's bluestem. It is native to the central and eastern United States. It can be found in disturbed areas.

== Description ==
Andropogon gyrans is a warm-season perennial bunch grass. A. gyrans grows to heights of 2.5-3 feet. The flowers typically bloom from August to October. The culms of Andropogon gyrans often exhibit glaucous internodes, with mostly erect and straight branches. The sheaths are smooth, and its ligules measure 0.3 to 1.5 millimetres, occasionally adorned with cilia up to 0.7 millimetres. Its blades range from 6 to 48 centimetres in length and 0.8 to 5 millimetres in width, presenting variations in pubescence from being glabrous to densely covered in spreading hairs. Andropogon gyrans typically bears 2 to 31 units per culm. The peduncles each bear 2 to 5 rames. The rames have a pubescence density increasing distally within each internode. The keels of lower glumes are scabrous only beyond midlength, while the awns measure between 8 and 24 millimetres. Anthers are singular and can appear yellow or purple. Pedicellate spikelets are either vestigial or absent.

== Distribution ==
A. gyrans is found from the east coast of the United States west to Texas, with its northernmost populations in Pennsylvania and Illinois.

== Ecology ==
A. gyrans is commonly grazed by cattle. It can also act as a minor source of food and cover for birds.
