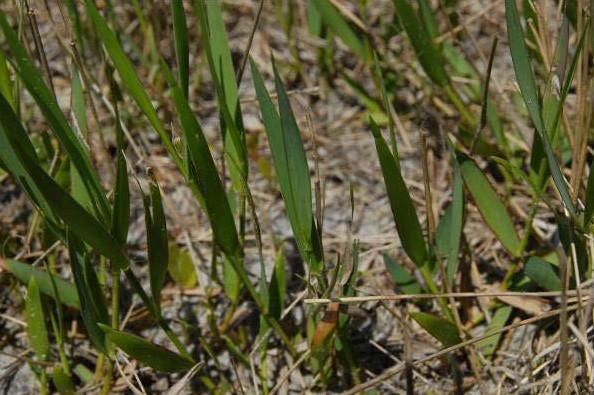
- Amphicarpum muehlenbergianum

Scientific classification
- Kingdom: Plantae
- Clade: Tracheophytes
- Clade: Angiosperms
- Clade: Monocots
- Clade: Commelinids
- Order: Poales
- Family: Poaceae
- Subfamily: Panicoideae
- Supertribe: Panicodae
- Tribe: Paniceae
- Subtribe: Boivinellinae
- Genus: Amphicarpum; Kunth

Type species
- Amphicarpum purshii (syn of A. amphicarpon) Kunth

= Amphicarpum =

Genus of grasses

Amphicarpum (common name maidencane) is a genus of North American plants in the grass family, found only in the eastern United States.

== Description ==
Amphicarpum is mostly found in the Northeast and Southeast United States. It is usually found in wetlands near rivers and lakes. The grass has two types of flowers, one aerial type and an underground type which self-fertilizes.

Species

- Amphicarpum amphicarpon (Pursh) Nash - MA NJ NY DE FL GA MD NC SC VA
- Amphicarpum muehlenbergianum (Schult.) Hitchc. - AL FL GA NC SC

== See also ==
- List of Poaceae genera
