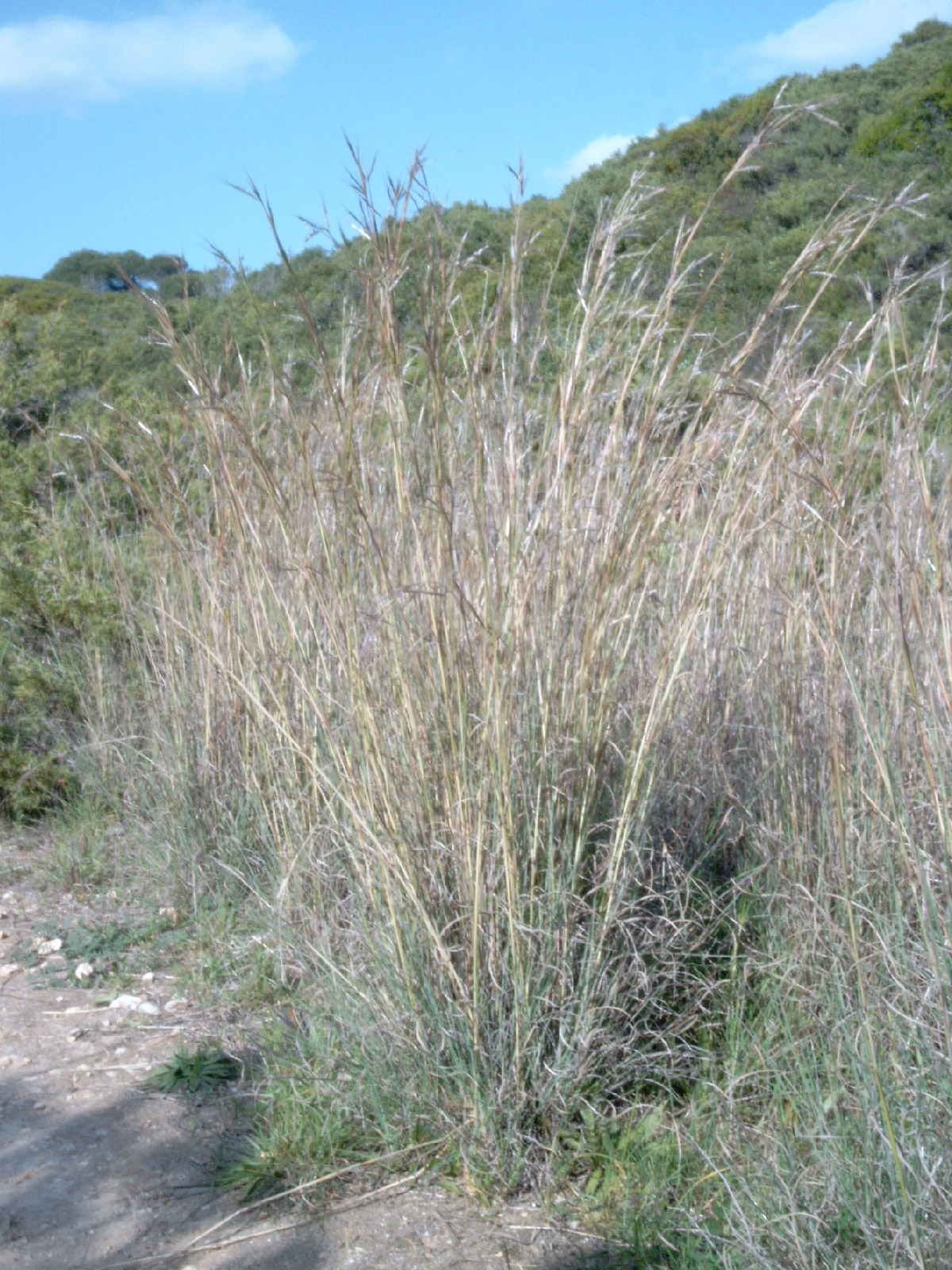

Scientific classification
- Kingdom: Plantae
- Clade: Tracheophytes
- Clade: Angiosperms
- Clade: Monocots
- Clade: Commelinids
- Order: Poales
- Family: Poaceae
- Subfamily: Panicoideae
- Genus: Andropogon
- Species: A. distachyos

Binomial name
- Andropogon distachyos L., nom. cons.

Synonyms
- Pollinia distachya

= Andropogon distachyos =

Species of plant

Andropogon distachyos is a species of perennial herb in the family Poaceae (true grasses). They have a self-supporting growth form and simple, broad leaves. Individuals can grow to 62 cm.

== Sources ==
This article incorporates text from a free content work. Licensed under CC0 (license statement/permission). Text taken from Andropogon distachyos. Encyclopedia of Life.
