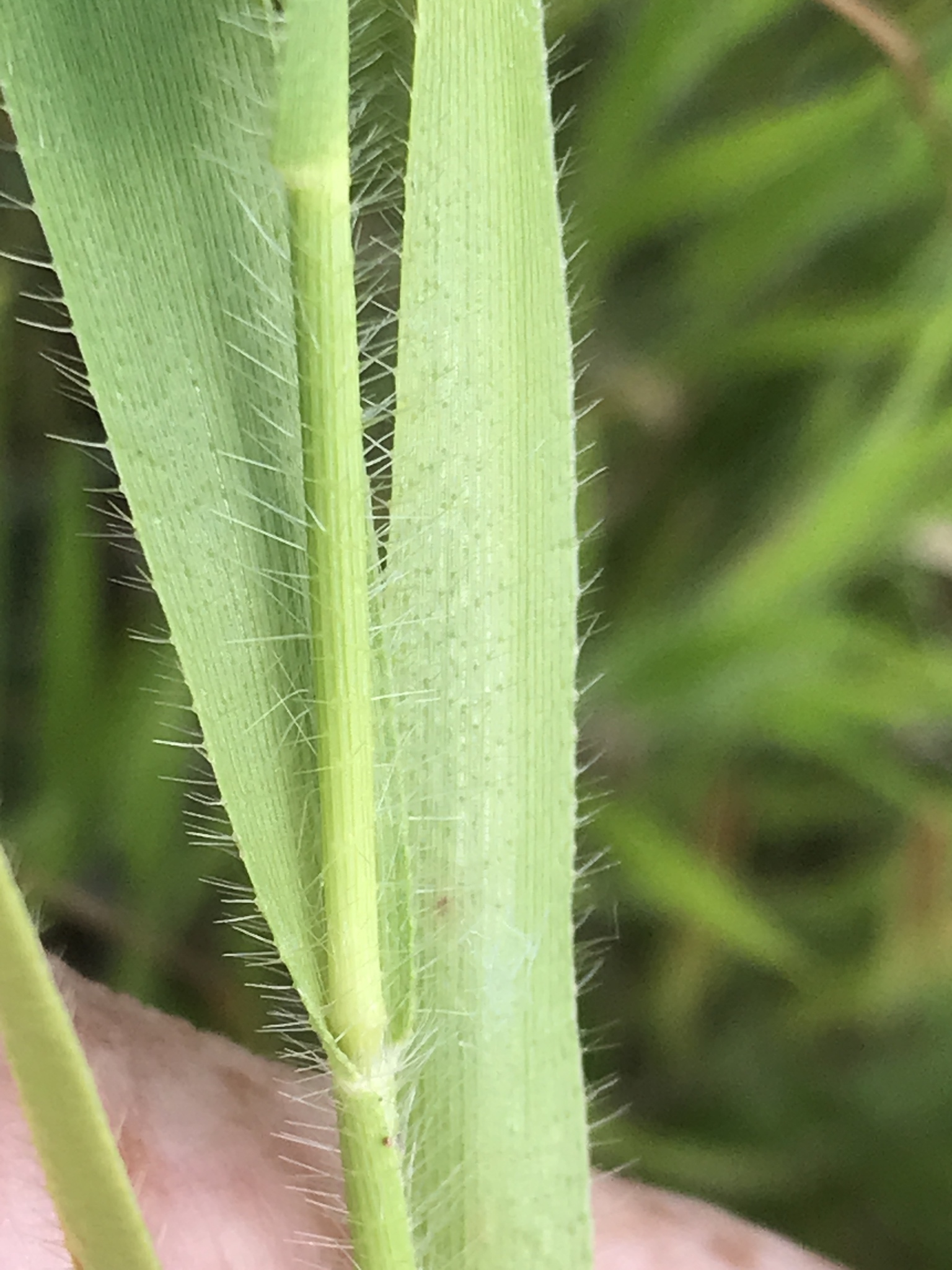

Scientific classification
- Kingdom: Plantae
- Clade: Tracheophytes
- Clade: Angiosperms
- Clade: Monocots
- Clade: Commelinids
- Order: Poales
- Family: Poaceae
- Subfamily: Panicoideae
- Genus: Amphicarpum
- Species: A. amphicarpon

Binomial name
- Amphicarpum amphicarpon (Pursh) Nash

Synonyms
- Amphicarpum purshii

= Amphicarpum amphicarpon =

Species of plant

Amphicarpum amphicarpon, commonly known as peanut grass or Pursh's blue maidencane, is an annual wetland species found in the eastern United States. Its common name honours botanist Frederick Traugott Pursh. It was previously considered to be part of the genus Milium.

== Distribution ==
It is found along the coastal areas from New Jersey to Georgia. It was previously found within New York state but is now considered possibly extirpated. A single population was discovered on Nantucket in 1988, 240 miles north of its previously known northernmost site.

== Description ==
Amphicarpum amphicarpon grows 1 to 2 feet (0.30 to 0.61 m) tall. Its stems and leaves are bristly and hairy; the leaves ascend.

The plant produces subterranean fruits early in the growing season, which are self-fertilizing (cleistogamous). Later, it produces aerial fruits. It flowers and fruits between August and October.
