= Andropogon scabriglumis =

Conservation status
- Endangered (IUCN 3.1)

Scientific classification
- Kingdom: Plantae
- Clade: Tracheophytes
- Clade: Angiosperms
- Clade: Monocots
- Clade: Commelinids
- Order: Poales
- Family: Poaceae
- Subfamily: Panicoideae
- Genus: Andropogon
- Species: A. scabriglumis

Binomial name
- Andropogon scabriglumis Swallen

Species of grass

Andropogon scabriglumis is a species of grass in the family Poaceae. It is found only in Ecuador, where it is known only from a single collection.
