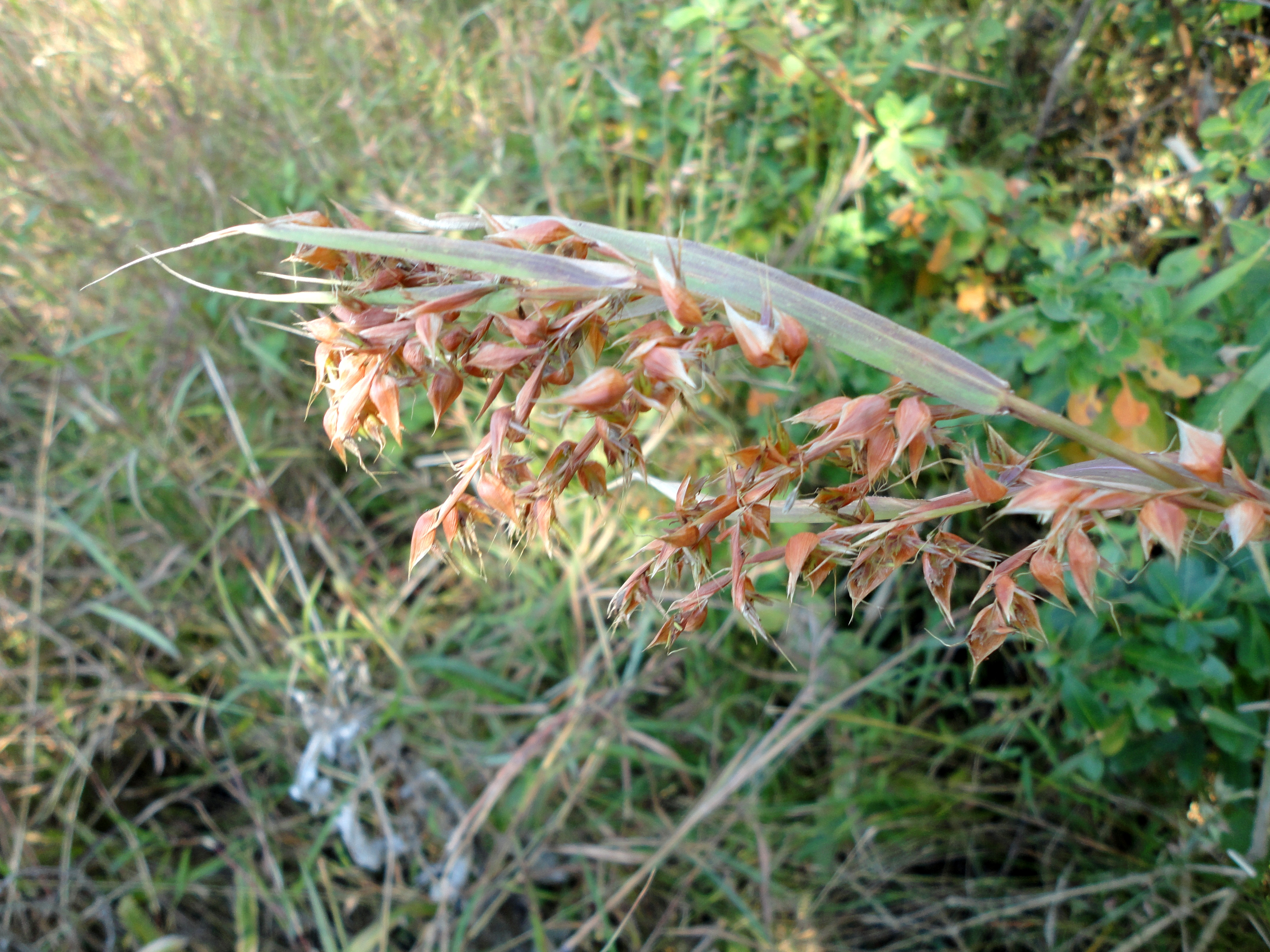

Scientific classification
- Kingdom: Plantae
- Clade: Tracheophytes
- Clade: Angiosperms
- Clade: Monocots
- Clade: Commelinids
- Order: Poales
- Family: Poaceae
- Subfamily: Panicoideae
- Genus: Hyparrhenia
- Species: H. cymbaria

Binomial name
- Hyparrhenia cymbaria (L.) Stapf

Synonyms
- List: Andropogon cymbarius L.; Anthistiria cymbaria (L.) Roxb.; Cymbopogon cymbarius (L.) Rendle; Cymbopogon elegans Spreng., nom. illeg.; Sorghum cymbarium (L.) Kuntze; Andropogon boivinii Steud.; Andropogon cymbarius var. lepidus (Nees) Stapf; Andropogon intonsus Nees; Andropogon lepidus Nees; Andropogon lepidus var. intonsus (Nees) Hack.; Andropogon lepidus var. viridis Chiov.; Andropogon serratifolius B.Heyne ex Wall., nom. nud.; Anthistiria latifolia Andersson; Cymbopogon lepidus (Nees) Chiov.; Hyparrhenia lepida (Nees) Cufod.; Sorghum lepidum (Nees) Kuntze

= Hyparrhenia cymbaria =

Species of plant

Hyparrhenia cymbaria is a species of perennial bunchgrass. It is native to Africa, Madagascar and India. It is introduced in Mexico.
