= Andropogon arctatus =

Scientific classification
- Kingdom: Plantae
- Clade: Tracheophytes
- Clade: Angiosperms
- Clade: Monocots
- Clade: Commelinids
- Order: Poales
- Family: Poaceae
- Subfamily: Panicoideae
- Genus: Andropogon
- Species: A. arctatus

Binomial name
- Andropogon arctatus Chapm.

Species of flowering plant

Andropogon arctatus, the Florida bluestem or pinewoods bluestem, is a perennial grass species endemic to the American states of Florida and Alabama. A. arctatus can be found in habitat types such as pine flatwoods, scrub, and within savanna communities. It does best in dry to wet loamy sand.
