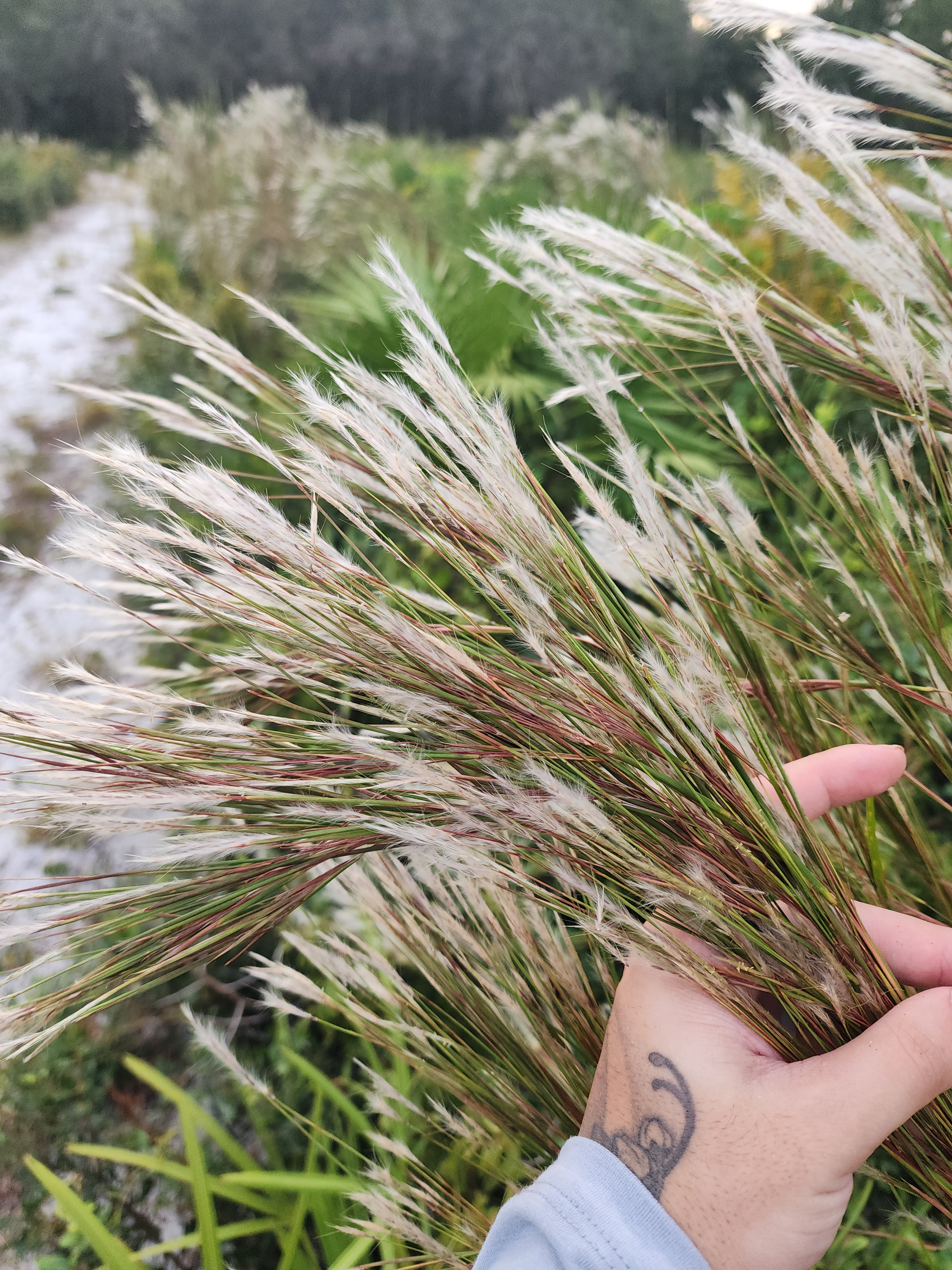
- Thriving in recently burned white sand scrub

Conservation status
- Apparently Secure (NatureServe)

Scientific classification
- Kingdom: Plantae
- Clade: Tracheophytes
- Clade: Angiosperms
- Clade: Monocots
- Clade: Commelinids
- Order: Poales
- Family: Poaceae
- Subfamily: Panicoideae
- Genus: Andropogon
- Species: A. floridanus

Binomial name
- Andropogon floridanus Scribn.

= Andropogon floridanus =

Species of flowering plant

Andropogon floridanus, commonly referred to as Florida bluestem, is a species of grass endemic to the US southeast coastal plain, primarily in the state of Florida, although it may have scattered populations in Georgia and Alabama.

== Habitat ==
It occurs in the dry, sandy, fire-adapted habitats of the region including scrub, longleaf pine-turkey oak sandhill, and scrubby flatwoods.

== Conservation ==
The species' primary threat is habitat loss from development for real estate, agriculture, and silviculture. It is also threatened by fire suppression.
