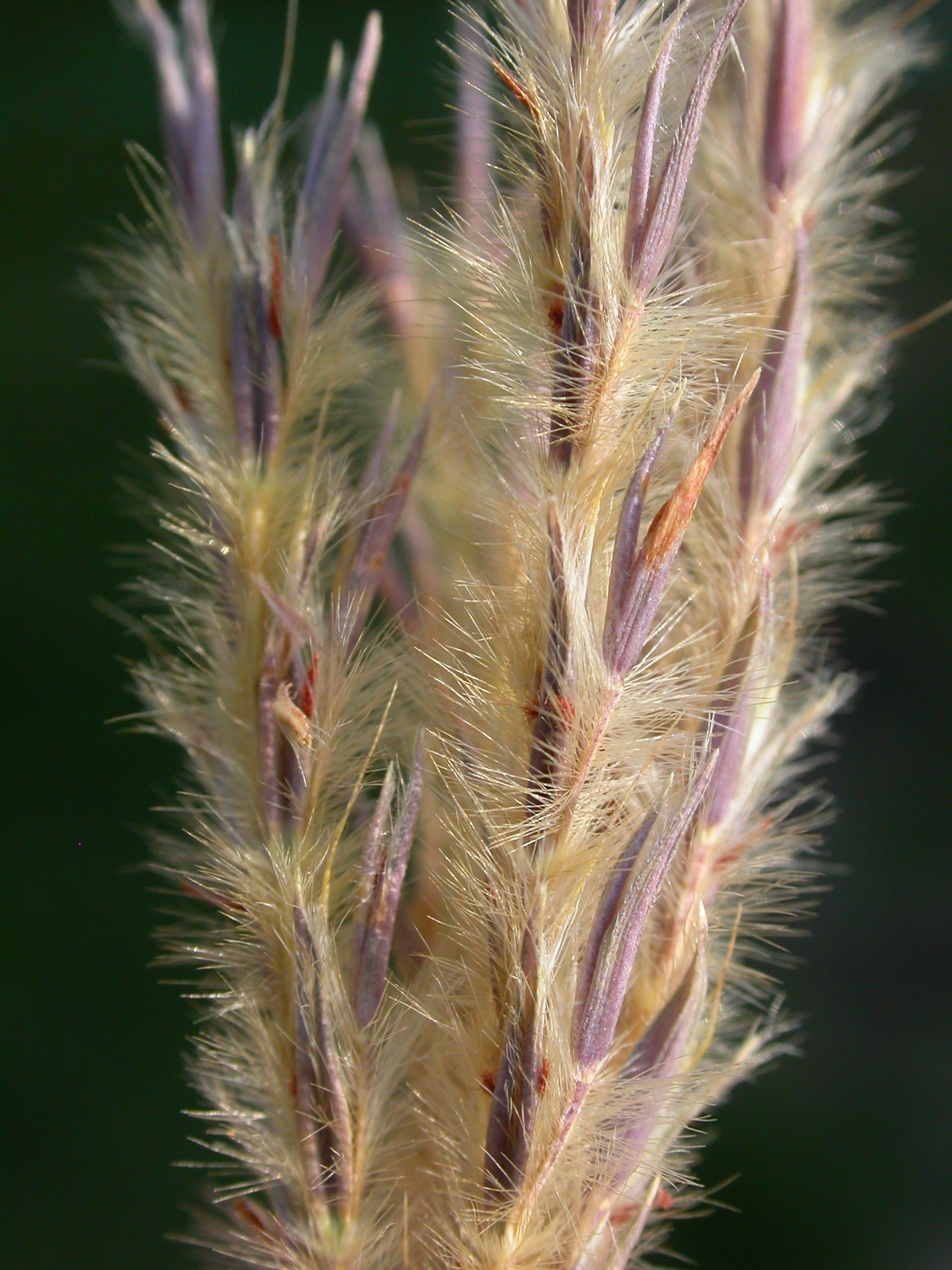

Scientific classification
- Kingdom: Plantae
- Clade: Tracheophytes
- Clade: Angiosperms
- Clade: Monocots
- Clade: Commelinids
- Order: Poales
- Family: Poaceae
- Subfamily: Panicoideae
- Genus: Andropogon
- Species: A. hallii

Binomial name
- Andropogon hallii Hack.

Synonyms
- Andropogon gerardii Vitman var. incanescens (Hack.) B. Boivin; Andropogon gerardii Vitman var. paucipilus (Nash) Fernald; Andropogon gerardii Vitman var. chrysocomus (Nash) Fernald; Andropogon hallii Hack. var. incanescens Hack.; Andropogon paucipilus Nash

= Andropogon hallii =

Species of flowering plant

Andropogon hallii (sand bluestem, sand hill bluestem, Hall's bluestem, Hall's beardgrass, prairie bluestem, turkey-foot) is a sod-forming perennial species in the grass family, Poaceae. It is a bunchgrass which grows in tufts and can reach 7 feet (2.1 meters) in height under favorable conditions.

Sand bluestem is native to North America. It is found growing from the Mississippi River west to the Rocky Mountains and from Canada to Chihuahua, Mexico. It prefers sandy soils and will dominate in areas that average less than 30 inches of rain annually.

Sand bluestem is a high quality forage with good palatability for livestock, but it cannot stand up to continuous heavy grazing. It is also valuable as browse for wildlife and as a source of edible seeds and nesting habitat for upland birds.
