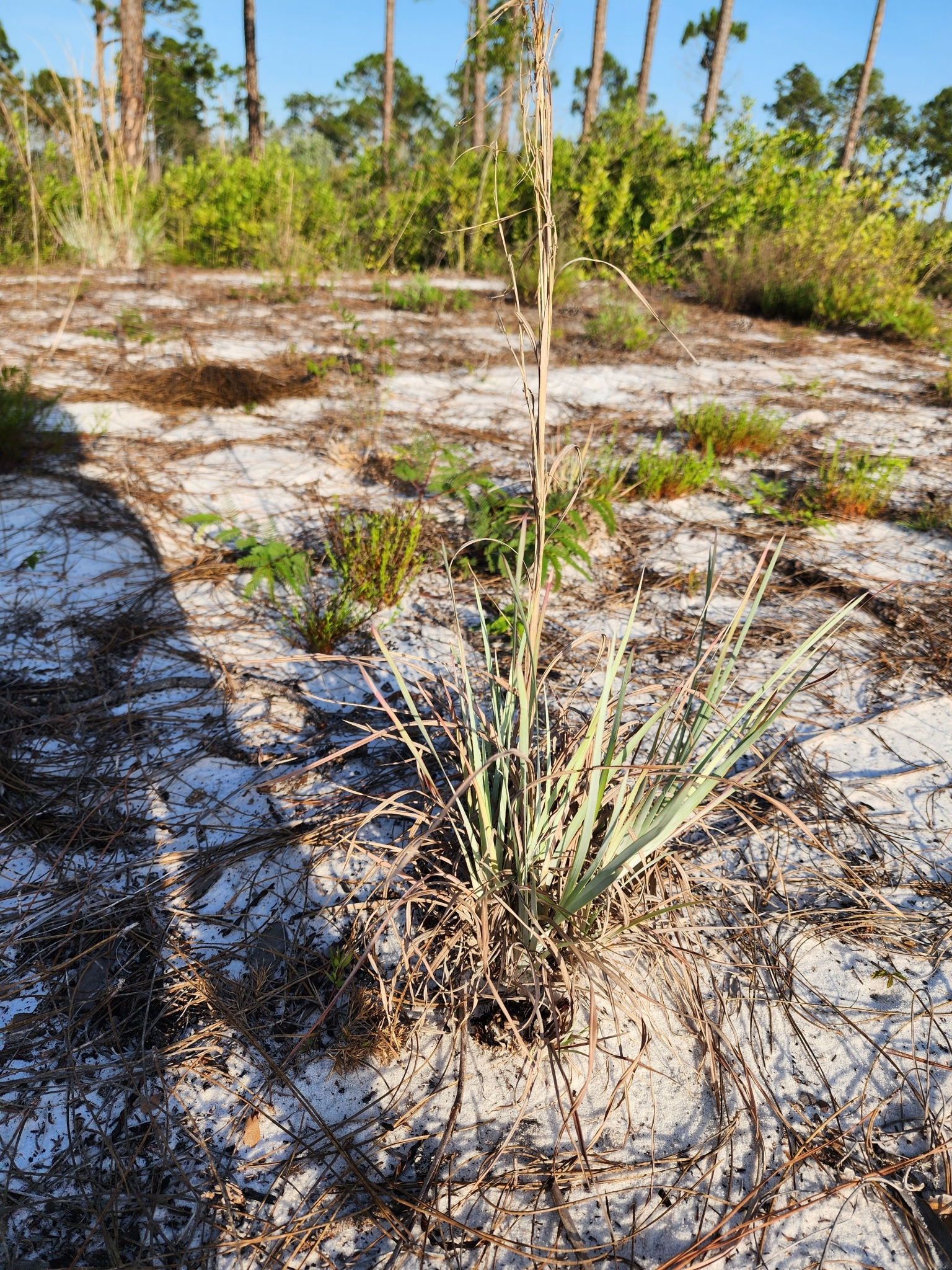

Conservation status
- Apparently Secure (NatureServe)

Scientific classification
- Kingdom: Plantae
- Clade: Tracheophytes
- Clade: Angiosperms
- Clade: Monocots
- Clade: Commelinids
- Order: Poales
- Family: Poaceae
- Subfamily: Panicoideae
- Genus: Andropogon
- Species: A. capillipes

Binomial name
- Andropogon capillipes Nash

= Andropogon capillipes =

Species of flowering plant

Andropogon capillipes is a species of grass known by the common name chalky bluestem. It is native to the southeastern United States as far west as Texas.

This perennial grass grows 3 to 5 feet tall. The leaf blades are folded, the longest reaching 25 inches long. The plant is coated in a chalky residue that easily rubs off.

This species is used for grazing livestock. It grows easily on wet, sandy, mucky substrates and it can be used to prevent erosion.

Cultivars of this species include 'Valdosta Blue', which is used as an ornamental grass.
