= Exotheca =

Scientific classification
- Kingdom: Plantae
- Clade: Embryophytes
- Clade: Tracheophytes
- Clade: Angiosperms
- Clade: Monocots
- Clade: Commelinids
- Order: Poales
- Family: Poaceae
- Subfamily: Panicoideae
- Supertribe: Andropogonodae
- Tribe: Andropogoneae
- Subtribe: Andropogoninae
- Genus: Exotheca; Andersson
- Species: E. abyssinica

Binomial name
- Exotheca abyssinica (Hochst. ex A.Rich.) Andersson

Synonyms
- Anthistiria abyssinica Hochst. ex A.Rich.; Andropogon exothecus Hack.; Sorghum exothecum (Hack.) Kuntze; Hyparrhenia abyssinica (Hochst. ex A.Rich.) Roberty; Andropogon monatherus A.Rich.; Hyparrhenia monathera (A.Rich.) Schweinf.; Sorghum monatherum (A.Rich.) Kuntze; Cymbopogon chevalieri A.Camus; Exotheca chevalieri (A.Camus) A.Camus ex M.Schmid

Genus of grasses

Exotheca is a monotypic genus of African and Southeast Asian plants in the grass family.

The only known species is Exotheca abyssinica, which has a disjunct (discontinuous) distribution. It is native to Vietnam, Eastern Africa, and Southeastern Africa (from Eritrea to Mozambique).
