= Andropogon longiberbis =

Scientific classification
- Kingdom: Plantae
- Clade: Tracheophytes
- Clade: Angiosperms
- Clade: Monocots
- Clade: Commelinids
- Order: Poales
- Family: Poaceae
- Subfamily: Panicoideae
- Genus: Andropogon
- Species: A. longiberbis

Binomial name
- Andropogon longiberbis Hack.

Longbeard bluestem

Andropogon longiberbis, the longbeard bluestem or hairy bluestem, is a species of perennial grass whose native range encompasses the southeastern United States, with additional disjunct populations located in the Bahamas.

== Description ==
Andropogon longiberbis is a bunch grass that reach a height between 5 and 10 decimeters (approximately 1.64 to 3.28 feet). The leaf blades exist at the base of the individual's stems, and reach a length between 11 and 50 centimeters (approximately 4.33 to 19.69 inches) with a width of 2 to 10 millimeters.

Inflorescence most commonly occurs in units of 45 per culm, although the number can vary from anywhere between 7 and 97.

== Distribution and habitat ==
Within the United States, A. longiberbis can be found from North Carolina to southern Florida.

This species does best in semi-opened areas with sunlight, and has thus been observed growing in habitats such as along roadsides, in ditches, and in pine plantations (among other environments).
