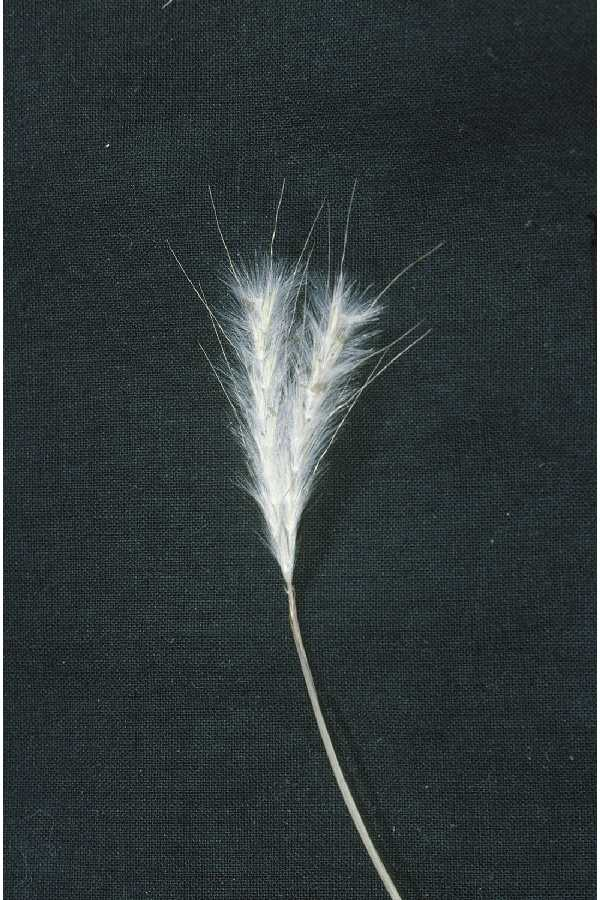

Conservation status
- Secure (NatureServe)

Scientific classification
- Kingdom: Plantae
- Clade: Tracheophytes
- Clade: Angiosperms
- Clade: Monocots
- Clade: Commelinids
- Order: Poales
- Family: Poaceae
- Subfamily: Panicoideae
- Genus: Anatherum
- Species: A. ternarium

Binomial name
- Anatherum ternarium (Michx.) Voronts. & E.A.Kellogg

Synonyms
- List: Anatherum argyreum (Schult. ex Steud.) Roberty; Anatherum virginicum subvar. elliottii Roberty; Andropogon argenteus Elliott; Andropogon argyreus Schult. ex Steud.; Andropogon argyreus var. macer Scribn.; Andropogon argyreus var. tenuis Vasey; Andropogon belvisii Desv.; Andropogon elliottii Chapm.; Andropogon elliottii var. glaucescens Scribn.; Andropogon mississippiensis Scribn. & C.R.Ball; Andropogon muehlenbergianus Schult.; Andropogon scribnerianus Nash; Andropogon ternarius Michx.; Andropogon ternarius var. glaucescens (Scribn.) Fernald & Griscom; Sorghum argenteum Kuntze; Sorghum elliottii Kuntze

= Anatherum ternarium =

Species of grass

Anatherum ternarium (syn. Andropogon ternarius) is a species of grass with the common names split bluestem, splitbeard bluestem, silver bluestem, and paintbrush bluestem. It is native to the southeastern, east-central, and south-central parts of the United States, where it occurs from New Jersey south to Florida and west to Kansas, Oklahoma, and Texas, and into northeastern Mecixo.

This perennial grass forms tufts of branching stems reaching 120 to 150 centimeters in maximum height. The inflorescence is made up of pairs of feathery racemes, each of which contains pairs of spikelets. Each pair is made up of one fertile spikelet and one sterile. The fertile spikelet has an awn up to 2.5 centimeters long. The spikelets are coated in very long, silvery hairs. In the Great Plains, the grass blooms in August through October. In the Carolinas blooming occurs in September and October and in Louisiana the grass blooms in the fall. One variety of this species, the Florida endemic var. cabanisii, has been treated as a separate species, A. cabanisii.

This grass grows in pine and oak forests and on prairie. It is dominant in the pine savanna around the Texas-Louisiana border. It grows in disturbed habitat types such as grazed pastures, ditches, and abandoned crop fields. Old fields in the southern United States are often colonized with the grass and its relative, broomsedge (Andropogon virginicus). In the ecological succession of abandoned fields in the region, the bluestem grasses grow after various annual and perennial weeds but before pines move in to shade them out.

Cattle graze on the grass. Northern bobwhite are known to nest in bunches of it.
