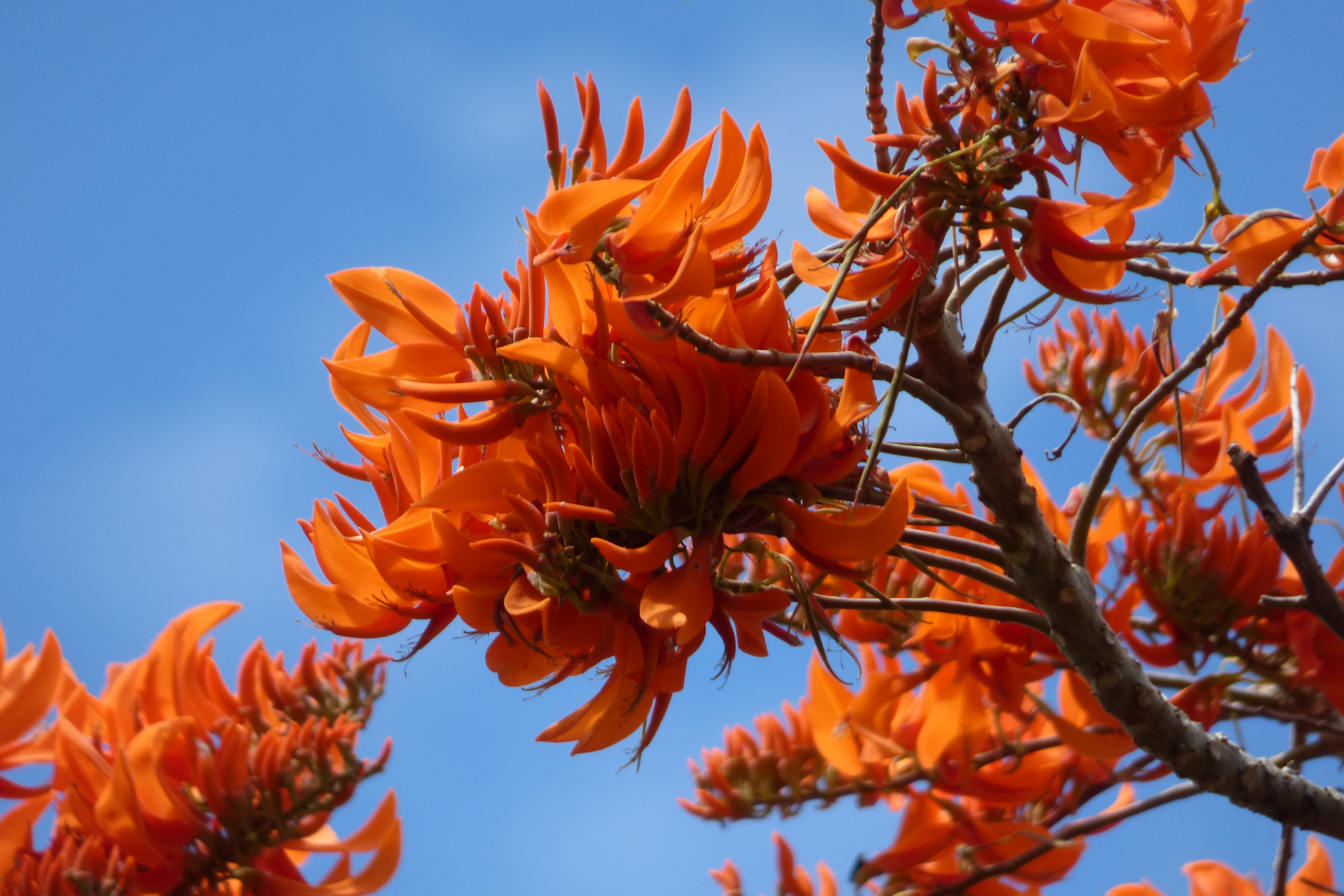
- Flowers

Scientific classification
- Kingdom: Plantae
- Clade: Embryophytes
- Clade: Tracheophytes
- Clade: Angiosperms
- Clade: Eudicots
- Clade: Rosids
- Order: Fabales
- Family: Fabaceae
- Subfamily: Faboideae
- Genus: Erythrina
- Species: E. poeppigiana

Binomial name
- Erythrina poeppigiana (Walp.) O.F.Cook

Synonyms
- List: Erythrina amasisa Spruce; Erythrina micropteryx Poepp. ex Urb.; Erythrina pisamo Posada-Ar.; Erythrina poeppigiana f. redmondii Steyerm. & Lasser; Micropteryx poeppigiana Walp.

= Erythrina poeppigiana =

Species of flowering plant

Erythrina poeppigiana, called the mountain immortelle, is a species of flowering plant in the genus Erythrina, native to northern and western South America, and introduced to various places in Central America, the Caribbean, Africa, India and tropical Asia. Its striking display of orange flowers has led to its use as an ornamental street tree. It is the emblematic state tree of Mérida, Venezuela. Widely cultivated, it is a nitrogen fixer and a source of fodder.

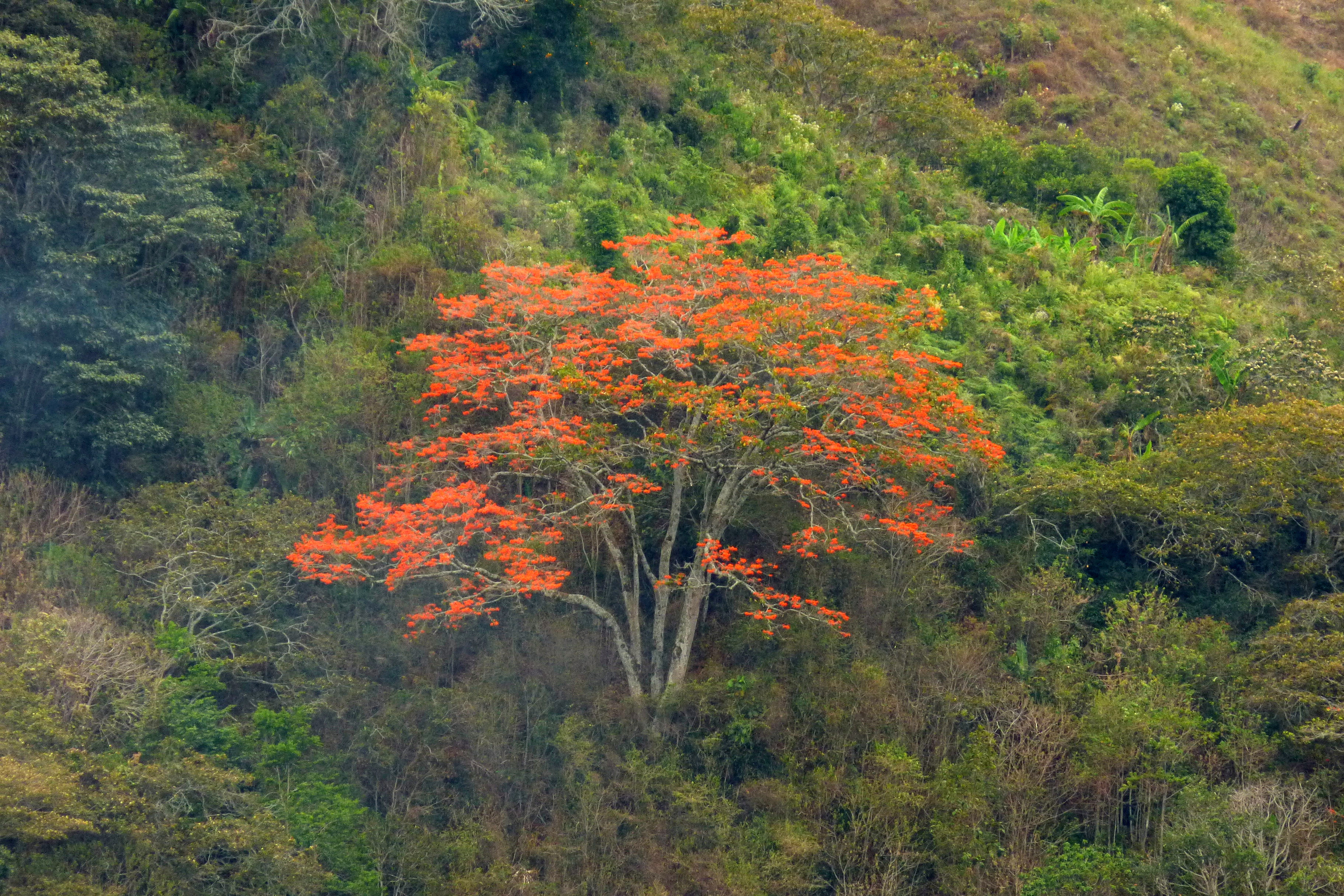
In a natural setting

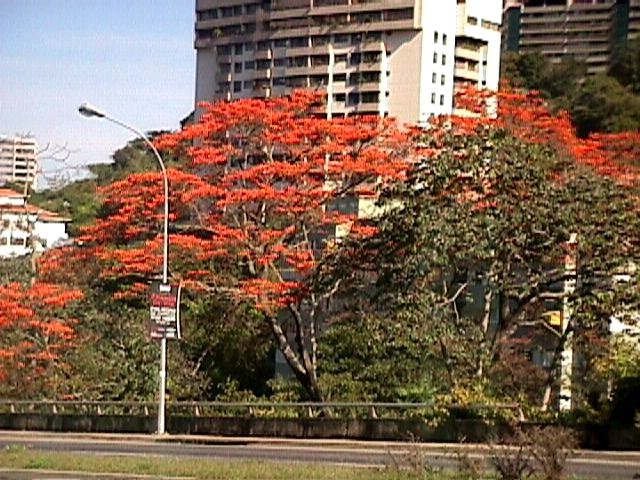
In a city setting

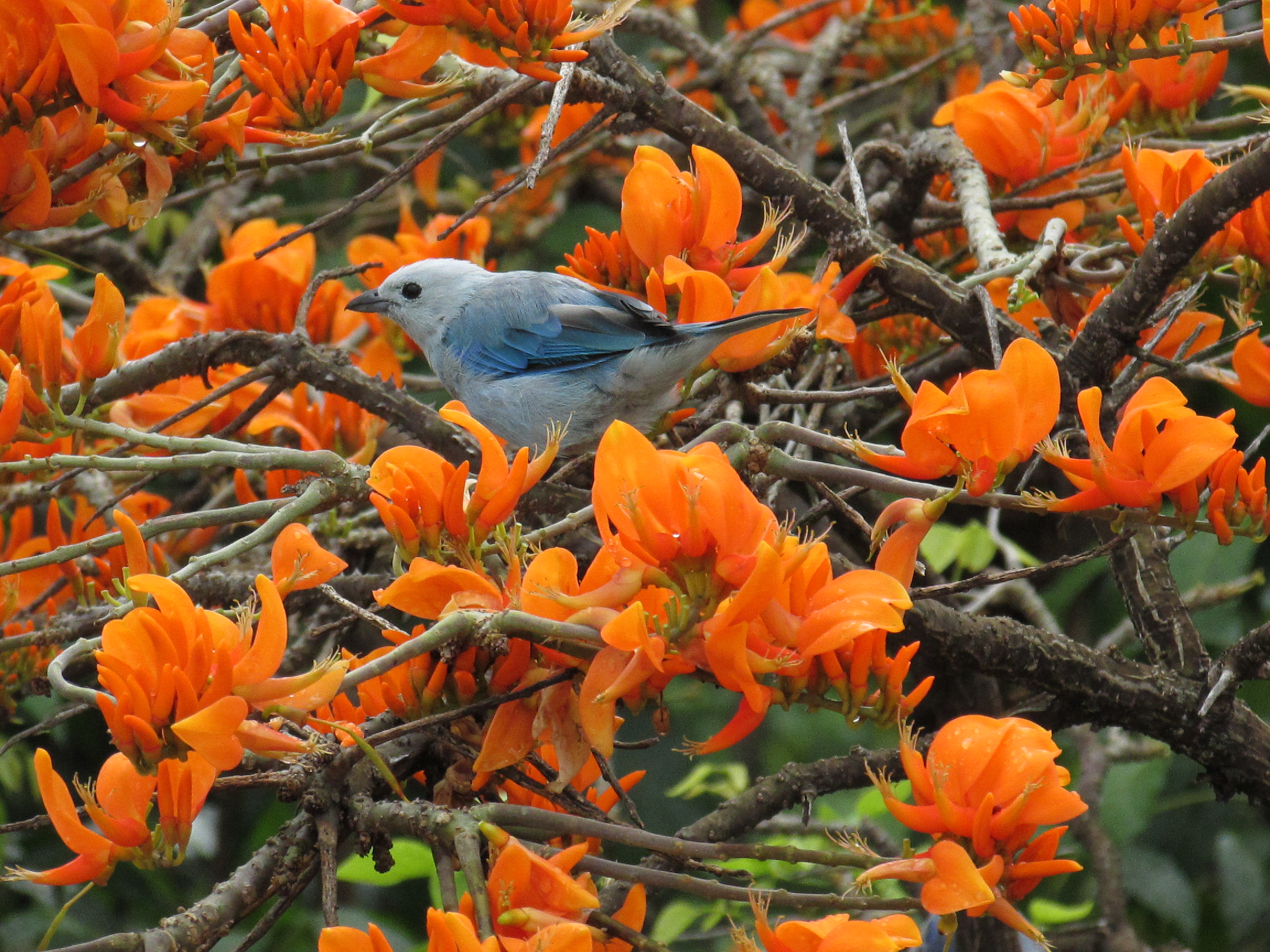
Blue-gray tanager

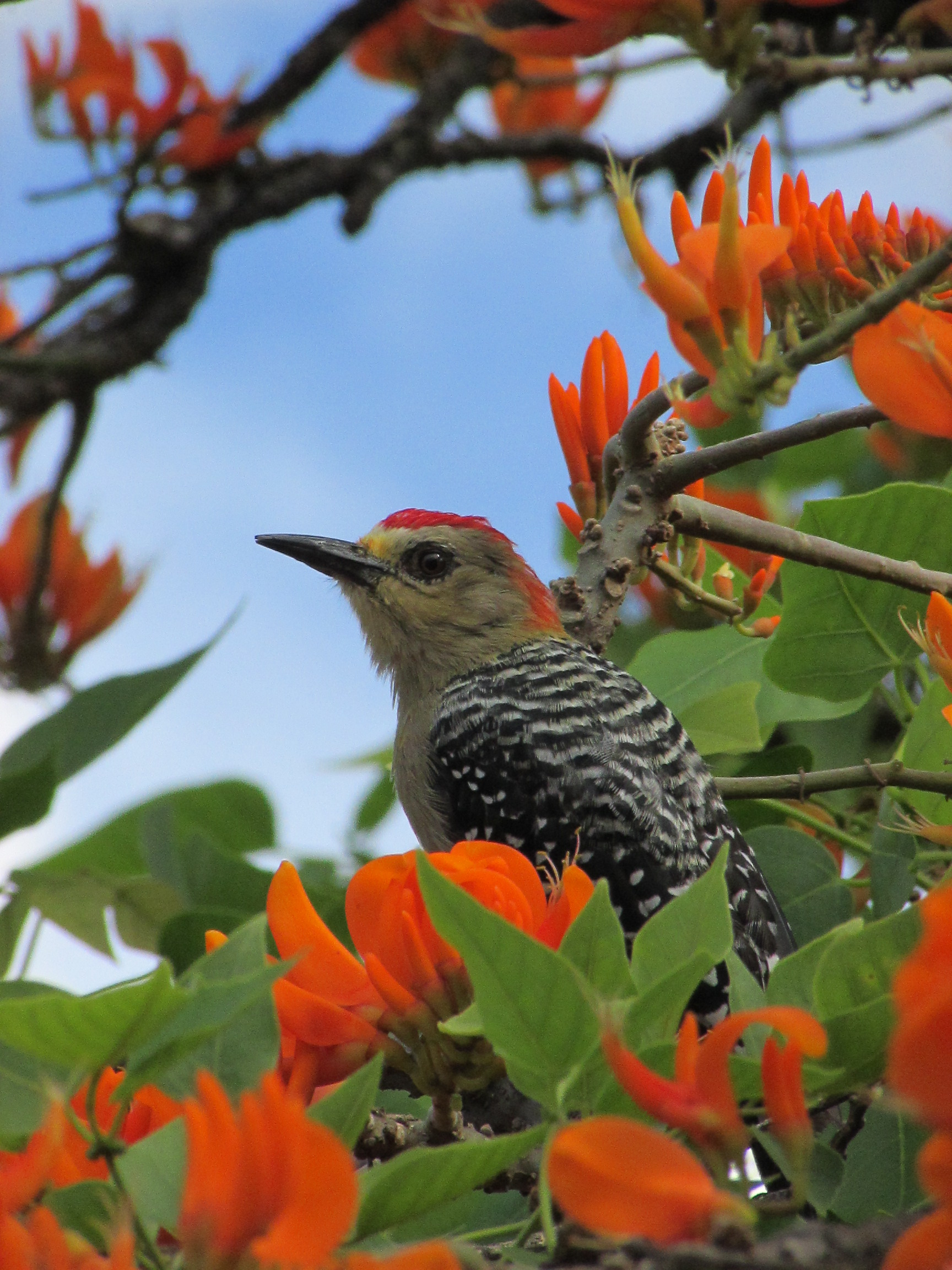
Red-crowned woodpecker

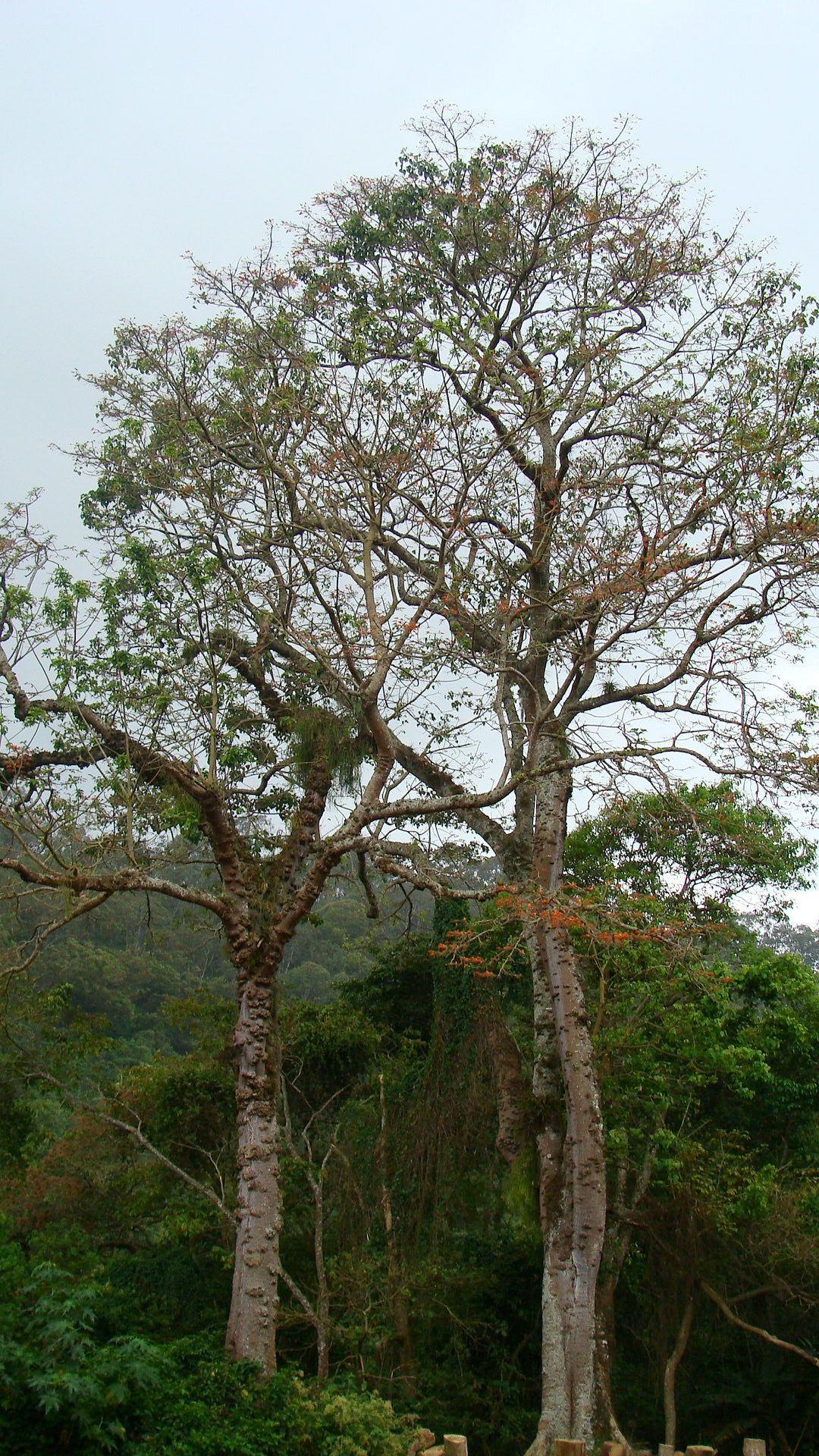
Stand

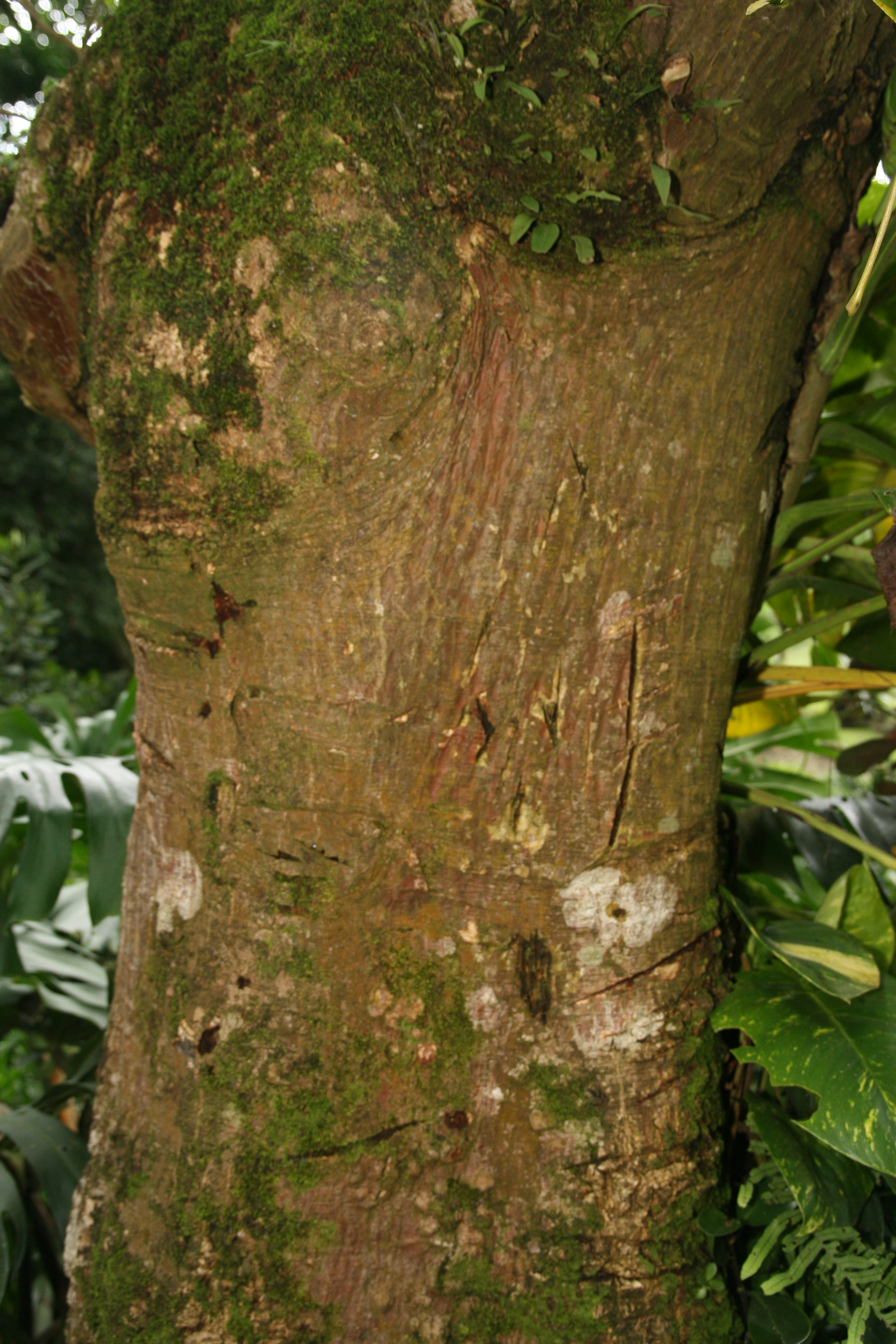
Trunk
