= Eragrostis ciliaris =

Scientific classification
- Kingdom: Plantae
- Clade: Tracheophytes
- Clade: Angiosperms
- Clade: Monocots
- Clade: Commelinids
- Order: Poales
- Family: Poaceae
- Subfamily: Chloridoideae
- Genus: Eragrostis
- Species: E. ciliaris

Binomial name
- Eragrostis ciliaris (L.) R.Br.

Synonyms
- List: Andropogon amboinicus (L.) Merr.; Cynodon ciliaris (L.) Raspail; Eragrostis amboinensis Trin. ex Steud.; Eragrostis amboinica (L.) Druce; Eragrostis arabica Jaub. & Spach; Eragrostis boryana (Willd.) Steud.; Eragrostis ciliaris subsp. brachystachya (Boiss.) H.Scholz; Eragrostis compta Link; Eragrostis lasseri Luces; Eragrostis lobata Trin.; Eragrostis pulchella Parl.; Eragrostis villosa Trin.; Erosion ciliare (L.) Lunell; Macroblepharus contractus Phil.; Megastachya boryana (Willd.) Roem. & Schult.; Megastachya ciliaris (L.) P.Beauv.; Poa amboinensis L.; Poa amboinica L.; Poa boryana Willd.; Poa ciliaris L.; Poa compta (Link) Kunth; Poa elegans Poir.; Poa elliptica Willd. ex Steud.; Poa lobata (Trin.) Kunth

Species of grass

Eragrostis ciliaris, the gophertail lovegrass, is a species of grass (family Poaceae). It is native to the Old World Tropics; nearly all of Africa, Madagascar, other Indian Ocean islands, the Arabian Peninsula, the Indian Subcontinent, Myanmar, Vietnam, Taiwan and the Philippines and a number of Pacific islands, and has been introduced to the New World Tropics and Subtropics, from the southern United States to Argentina, the Caribbean, and other Pacific islands. Its seeds are edible and nutritious, but quite small and difficult to harvest and handle, so it is usually regarded as a famine food.
