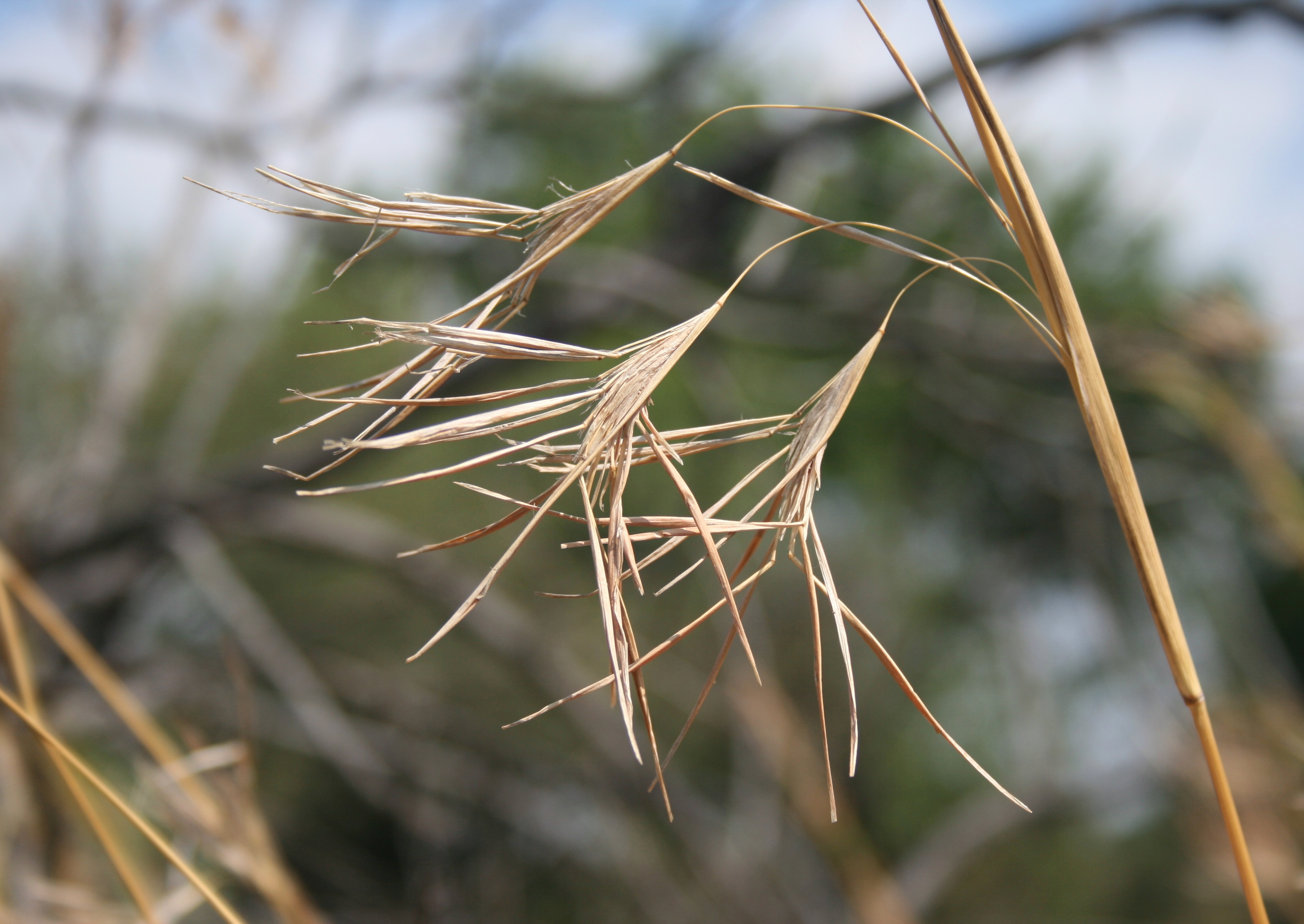

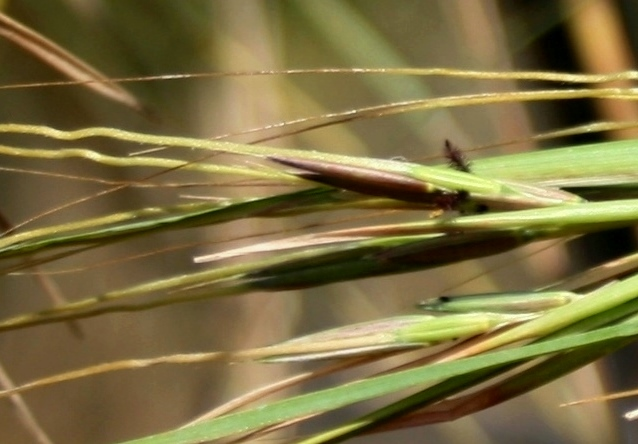
- Part of a dry inflorescence (above) and fresh spikelets (below)

Scientific classification
- Kingdom: Plantae
- Clade: Embryophytes
- Clade: Tracheophytes
- Clade: Angiosperms
- Clade: Monocots
- Clade: Commelinids
- Order: Poales
- Family: Poaceae
- Subfamily: Panicoideae
- Genus: Hyperthelia
- Species: H. dissoluta

Binomial name
- Hyperthelia dissoluta (Nees ex Steud.) Clayton

Synonyms
- List: Andropogon luteolus Vanderyst; Andropogon macrolepis Hack.; Andropogon ruprechtii Hack.; Cymbopogon ruprechtii (Hack.) Rendle; Hyparrhenia dissoluta (Nees ex Steud.) C.E.Hubb.; Hyparrhenia macrolepis (Hack.) Stapf; Hyparrhenia ruprechtii (Hack.) E.Fourn.; Hyperthelia macrolepis (Hack.) Clayton; Sorghum macrolepis (Hack.) Kuntze; Sorghum ruprechtii (Hack.) Kuntze

= Hyperthelia dissoluta =

Yellow thatching grass

Species of flowering plant

Hyperthelia dissoluta, the yellow thatching grass, is a species of flowering plant in the family Poaceae. It is native to Sub‑Saharan Africa and Madagascar. It has been introduced to Mexico, Central America, Colombia, and Brazil. Its palatability to livestock decreases markedly as the plant matures, and it is a very aggressive competitor, so it has developed a bad reputation among ranchers.
