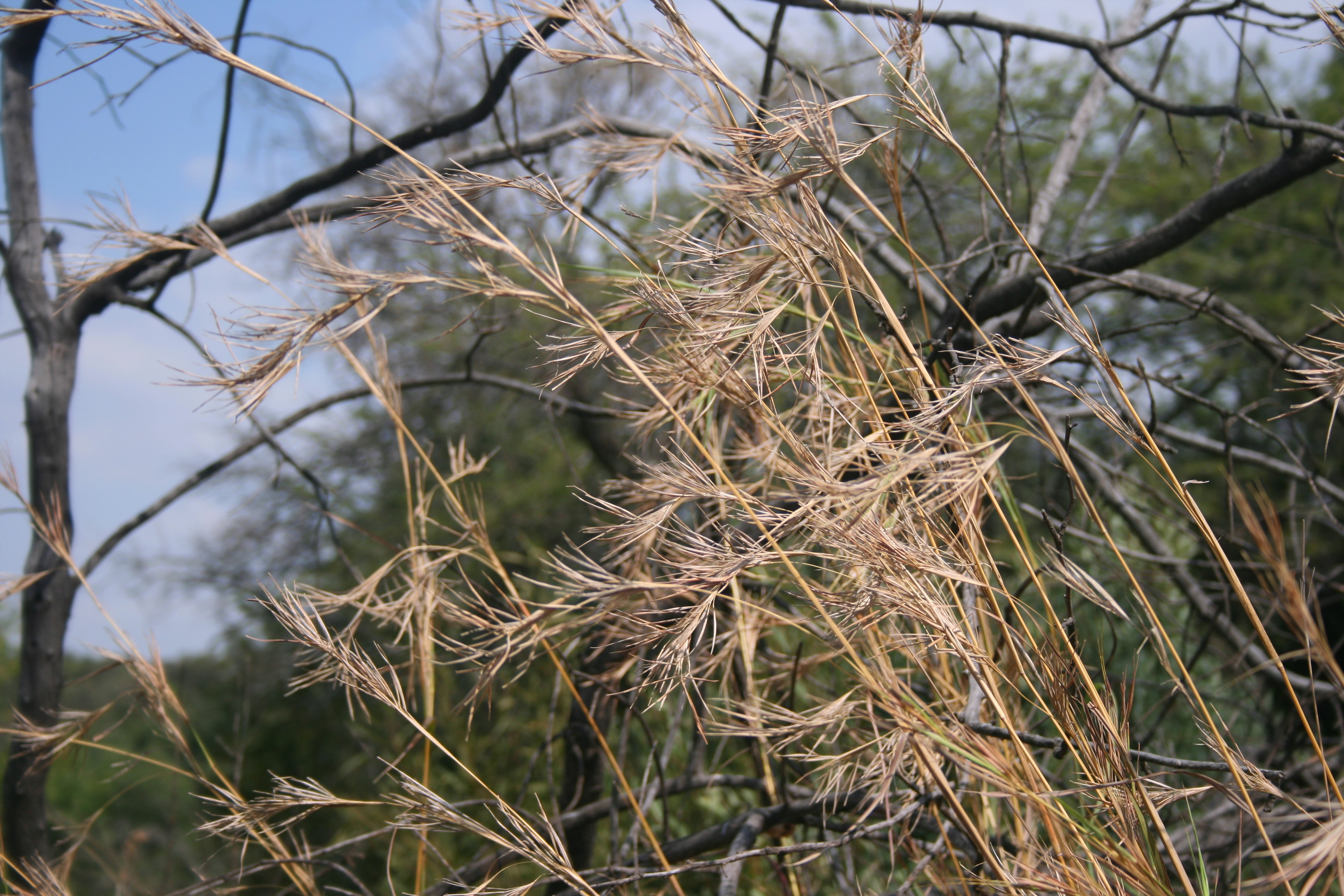
- inflorescences of H. dissoluta

Scientific classification
- Kingdom: Plantae
- Clade: Tracheophytes
- Clade: Angiosperms
- Clade: Monocots
- Clade: Commelinids
- Order: Poales
- Family: Poaceae
- Subfamily: Panicoideae
- Supertribe: Andropogonodae
- Tribe: Andropogoneae
- Subtribe: Andropogoninae
- Genus: Hyperthelia; Clayton

Type species
- Hyperthelia dissoluta (Nees ex Steud.) Clayton

= Hyperthelia =

Genus of grasses

Hyperthelia is a genus of African plants in the grass family.

Species

- Hyperthelia colobantha Clayton - Central African Rep
- Hyperthelia cornucopiae (Hack.) Clayton - Central African Rep, Chad, South Sudan
- Hyperthelia dissoluta (Nees ex Steud.) Clayton - most of sub-Saharan Africa incl Madagascar; naturalized in Latin America
- Hyperthelia edulis (C.E.Hubb.) Clayton - South Sudan
- Hyperthelia kottoensis Desc. & Mazade - Central African Rep
- Hyperthelia polychaeta Clayton - Central African Rep
