= Chalepus consanguineus =

Scientific classification
- Kingdom: Animalia
- Phylum: Arthropoda
- Clade: Pancrustacea
- Class: Insecta
- Order: Coleoptera
- Suborder: Polyphaga
- Infraorder: Cucujiformia
- Family: Chrysomelidae
- Genus: Chalepus
- Species: C. consanguineus

Binomial name
- Chalepus consanguineus Baly, 1885

Species of beetle

Chalepus consanguineus is a species of beetle of the family Chrysomelidae. It is found in Panama.

== Description ==
The vertex is smooth and impunctate. The front is deeply impressed with a longitudinal groove and the interocular space is strongly produced and obtuse. The antennae are less than half the length of the body, moderately robust and slightly thickened towards the apex. The thorax is transverse, the sides slightly but distinctly angulate, converging from base to apex, more quickly converging before the middle. The disc is transversely convex, excavated transversely behind the middle, coarsely and closely punctured. The elytra are broader than the thorax, parallel and rounded at the apex, the lateral margin obsoletely, the apical one distinctly, serrulate. Each elytron has ten, just before the middle with nine, rows of punctures, the second and fourth interspaces costate, the eighth less distinctly elevated.

== Biology ==
They have been recorded feeding on Lasiacis species, Verbesina greenmani and Benthamantha mollis.
