= Chalepus schmidti =

Scientific classification
- Kingdom: Animalia
- Phylum: Arthropoda
- Clade: Pancrustacea
- Class: Insecta
- Order: Coleoptera
- Suborder: Polyphaga
- Infraorder: Cucujiformia
- Family: Chrysomelidae
- Genus: Chalepus
- Species: C. schmidti

Binomial name
- Chalepus schmidti Uhmann, 1935

Synonyms
- Chalepus schmidti posticatus Uhmann, 1935; Chalepus repetitus Blackwelder, 1946

Species of beetle

Chalepus schmidti is a species of beetle of the family Chrysomelidae. It is found in Costa Rica and Nicaragua.

== Biology ==
They have been recorded feeding on Chusquea, Lasiacis and Panicum species.
