= Chalepus horni =

Scientific classification
- Kingdom: Animalia
- Phylum: Arthropoda
- Clade: Pancrustacea
- Class: Insecta
- Order: Coleoptera
- Suborder: Polyphaga
- Infraorder: Cucujiformia
- Family: Chrysomelidae
- Genus: Chalepus
- Species: C. horni

Binomial name
- Chalepus horni Baly, 1885

Synonyms
- Chalepus horianus Weise, 1911; Chalepus smithi Donckier, 1899

Species of beetle

Chalepus hepburni is a species of beetle of the family Chrysomelidae. It is found in Belize, Costa Rica, Mexico (Guerrero, Jalisco, Morelos, Puebla, Oaxaca, Tamaulipas, Veracruz) and Nicaragua.

== Description ==
The vertex and front are smooth and trisulcate, and there is a small indistinct patch just above the antennae. The interocular space is rather strongly produced. The antennae are less than a third the length of the body, filiform and slightly thickened towards the apex. The thorax is subcylindrical, the sides distinctly angulate, nearly straight and parallel from the base to the middle, then obliquely converging towards the apex. The upper surface is subcylindrical, rather deeply excavated transversely on the hinder disc, closely and coarsely rugose-punctate. The elytra are parallel on the sides, regularly rounded at the apex, the outer margin finely serrulate, the serratures scarcely stronger at the apex than on the sides. Each elytron has ten rows of punctures, the second, fourth, and eighth interspaces (the last less strongly) costate. The apical black patch varies greatly in extent. In some specimens it covers the hinder disc, in others it is confined to the extreme apex.

== Biology ==
They have been recorded feeding on Lasiacis species.
