= Chalepus erosus =

Scientific classification
- Kingdom: Animalia
- Phylum: Arthropoda
- Clade: Pancrustacea
- Class: Insecta
- Order: Coleoptera
- Suborder: Polyphaga
- Infraorder: Cucujiformia
- Family: Chrysomelidae
- Genus: Chalepus
- Species: C. erosus

Binomial name
- Chalepus erosus Uhmann, 1948

Species of beetle

Chalepus erosus is a species of beetle of the family Chrysomelidae. It is found in Brazil (Minas Gerais, São Paulo).

== Description ==
Adults reach a length of about 7.5 mm. Adults are dull black.
