= Chalepus putzeysi =

Scientific classification
- Kingdom: Animalia
- Phylum: Arthropoda
- Clade: Pancrustacea
- Class: Insecta
- Order: Coleoptera
- Suborder: Polyphaga
- Infraorder: Cucujiformia
- Family: Chrysomelidae
- Genus: Chalepus
- Species: C. putzeysi

Binomial name
- Chalepus putzeysi (Chapuis, 1877)

Synonyms
- Odontota putzeysi Chapuis, 1877; Chalepus sedulus Weise, 1905

Species of beetle

Chalepus putzeysi is a species of beetle of the family Chrysomelidae. It is found in Argentina, Bolivia, Brazil (Amazonas, Goyaz), Paraguay and Peru.

== Biology ==
They have been recorded feeding on Yaguapinda species and Paspalum quadrifarium.
