= Chalepus consimilis =

Scientific classification
- Kingdom: Animalia
- Phylum: Arthropoda
- Clade: Pancrustacea
- Class: Insecta
- Order: Coleoptera
- Suborder: Polyphaga
- Infraorder: Cucujiformia
- Family: Chrysomelidae
- Genus: Chalepus
- Species: C. consimilis

Binomial name
- Chalepus consimilis Weise, 1905

Species of beetle

Chalepus consimilis is a species of beetle of the family Chrysomelidae. It is found in Argentina, Brazil (Matto Grosso, São Paulo) and Paraguay.
