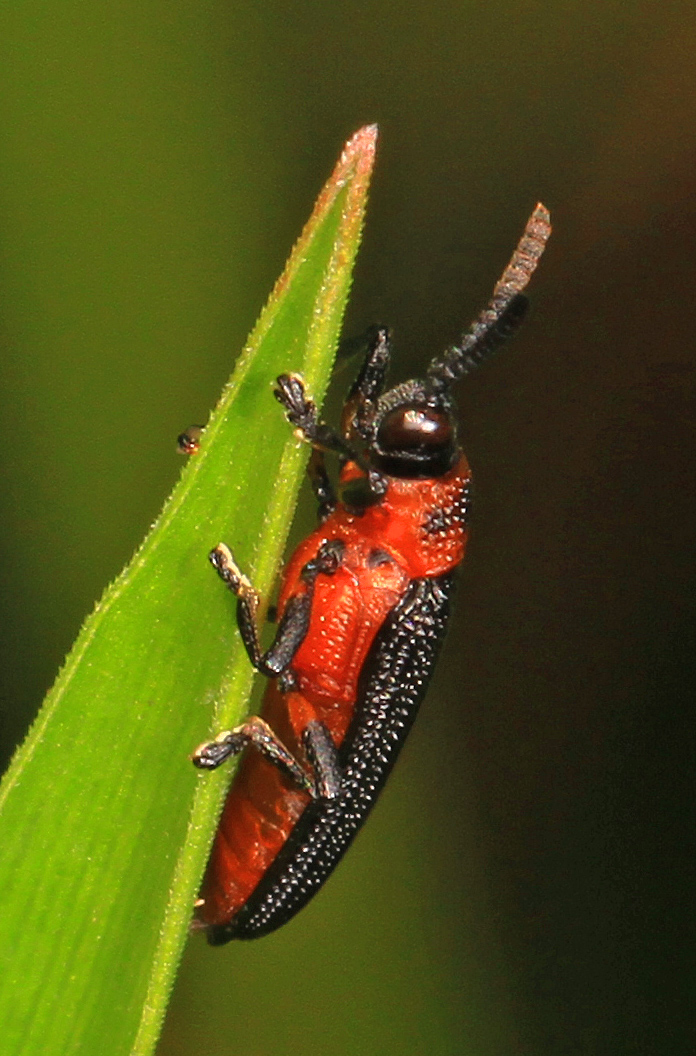
- Chalepus bicolor

Scientific classification
- Kingdom: Animalia
- Phylum: Arthropoda
- Class: Insecta
- Order: Coleoptera
- Suborder: Polyphaga
- Infraorder: Cucujiformia
- Family: Chrysomelidae
- Tribe: Chalepini
- Genus: Chalepus; Thunberg, 1805

Synonyms
- Parachalepus Baly, 1885; Anoplitis Kirby, 1837

= Chalepus =

Genus of beetles

Chalepus is a genus of tortoise beetles and hispines in the family Chrysomelidae. There are more than 90 described species in Chalepus.

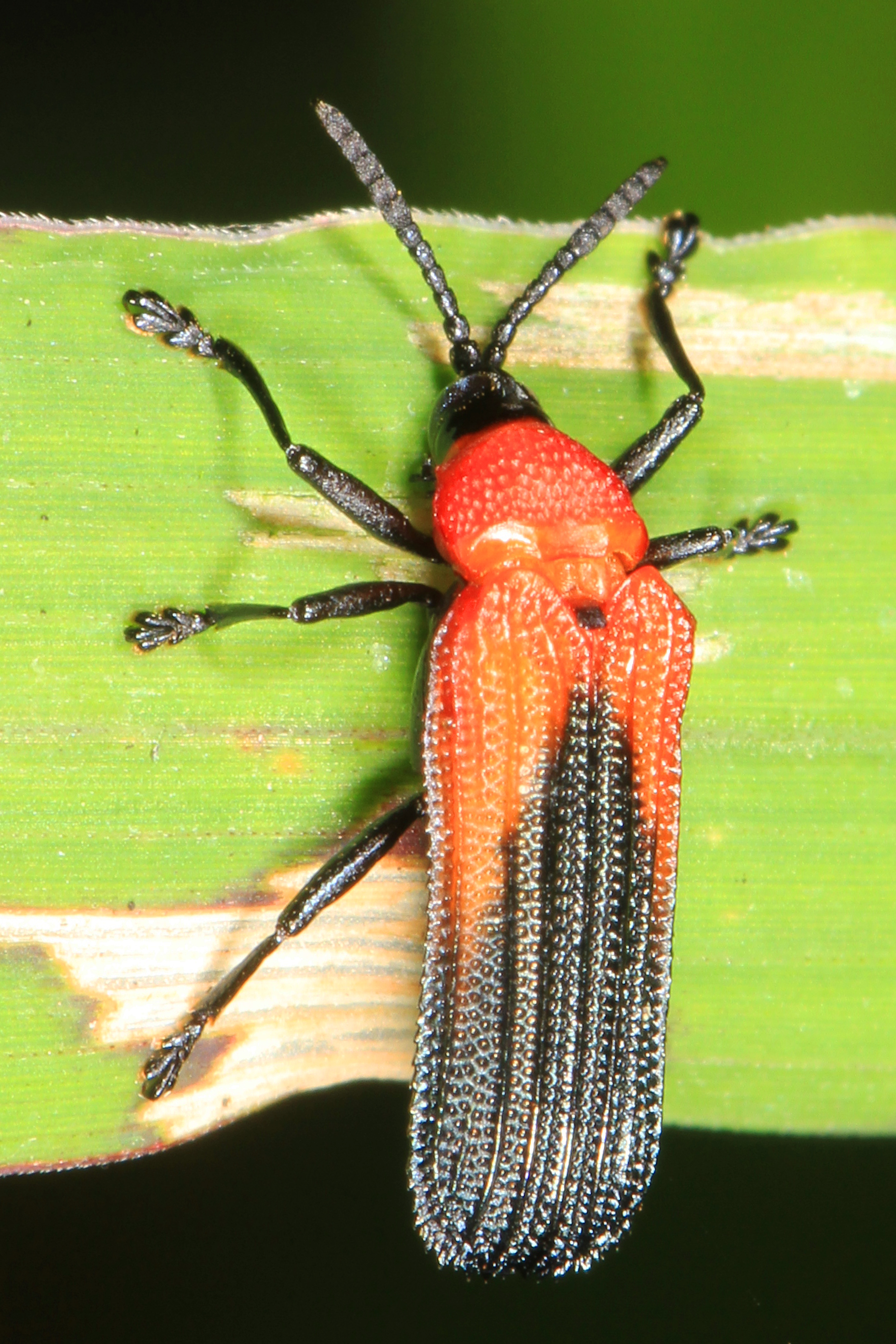
Chalepus sanguinicollis

== Species ==
These 98 species belong to the genus Chalepus:

- Chalepus acuticornis (Chapuis, 1877)
- Chalepus aeneicollis Uhmann, 1930
- Chalepus aenescens Weise, 1910
- Chalepus alternevittatus Pic, 1932
- Chalepus amabilis Baly, 1885
- Chalepus amiculus Baly, 1885
- Chalepus angulosus Baly, 1885
- Chalepus asperifrons (Chapuis, 1877)
- Chalepus assmanni Uhmann, 1936
- Chalepus aurantiacicollis Pic, 1931
- Chalepus bacchus (Newman, 1840)
- Chalepus badeni (Chapuis, 1877)
- Chalepus balli Uhmann, 1936
- Chalepus basilaris (Chapuis, 1877)
- Chalepus bellulus (Chapuis, 1877)
- Chalepus bicolor (Olivier, 1792)
- Chalepus bicoloriceps Pic, 1931
- Chalepus binotaticollis Pic, 1931
- Chalepus bivittatus Pic, 1932
- Chalepus breveapicalis Pic, 1931
- Chalepus brevicornis (Baly, 1885)
- Chalepus caracasensis Pic, 1931
- Chalepus cautus Weise, 1911
- Chalepus cincticollis Weise, 1905
- Chalepus clypeatus Baly, 1885
- Chalepus consanguineus Baly, 1885
- Chalepus consimilis Weise, 1905
- Chalepus cordiger (Chapuis, 1877)
- Chalepus cyanescens Spaeth, 1937
- Chalepus cyanicornis Spaeth, 1937
- Chalepus deborrei (Chapuis, 1877)
- Chalepus digressus Baly, 1885
- Chalepus dorni Uhmann, 1930
- Chalepus erosus Uhmann, 1948
- Chalepus flaveolus (Chapuis, 1877)
- Chalepus flexuosus (Guérin-Méneville in Cuvier, 1844)
- Chalepus forticornis Weise, 1905
- Chalepus garleppi Uhmann, 1939
- Chalepus generosus Baly, 1885
- Chalepus germaini Pic, 1931
- Chalepus guatemalanus Pic, 1934
- Chalepus hepburni Baly, 1885
- Chalepus horni Baly, 1885
- Chalepus lateralis Baly, 1885
- Chalepus lineola (Chapuis, 1877)
- Chalepus longehumeralis Pic, 1931
- Chalepus marginatus Baly, 1885
- Chalepus marginiventris (Chapuis, 1877)
- Chalepus modestus Weise, 1911
- Chalepus monilicornis Weise, 1910
- Chalepus nigripictus Baly, 1885
- Chalepus nigrithorax Pic, 1931
- Chalepus nigrovirens (Chapuis, 1877)
- Chalepus notula (Chapuis, 1877)
- Chalepus obidosensis Pic, 1929
- Chalepus panici Uhmann, 1950
- Chalepus parananus Pic, 1927
- Chalepus pauli Pic, 1932
- Chalepus perplexus (Chapuis, 1877)
- Chalepus pici Descarpentries & Villiers, 1959
- Chalepus picturatus Spaeth, 1937
- Chalepus plebeius (Chapuis, 1877)
- Chalepus porosus (Germar, 1824)
- Chalepus pullus Weise, 1905
- Chalepus pusillus Weise, 1910
- Chalepus putzeysi (Chapuis, 1877)
- Chalepus quadricostatus (Chapuis, 1877)
- Chalepus ruficollis Pic, 1932
- Chalepus rufiventris (Suffrian, 1868)
- Chalepus sanguinicollis (Linnaeus, 1771)
- Chalepus sanguinipennis Uhmann, 1930
- Chalepus schmidti Uhmann, 1935
- Chalepus scutellaris Pic, 1931
- Chalepus scutellatus Uhmann, 1931
- Chalepus selectus Weise, 1911
- Chalepus similatus Baly, 1885
- Chalepus subcordiger Uhmann, 1935
- Chalepus subhumeralis Baly, 1885
- Chalepus submarginatus Pic, 1932
- Chalepus submetallicus Pic, 1931
- Chalepus subparallelus Baly, 1885
- Chalepus tappesi (Chapuis, 1877)
- Chalepus testaceiceps Pic, 1931
- Chalepus teutonicus Uhmann, 1943
- Chalepus titschacki Uhmann, 1931
- Chalepus trivittatus Pic, 1932
- Chalepus verticalis (Chapuis, 1877)
- Chalepus vicinalis Baly, 1885
- Chalepus viduus Weise, 1905
- Chalepus walshii (Crotch, 1873)
- Chalepus weyersi (Chapuis, 1877)
- Chalepus wygodzinskyi Uhmann, 1951
- Chalepus yucatanus Champion, 1894

== Species incertae sedis ==
- Chalepus atricornis (Say, 1835) (Mexico)
- Chalepus circumcinctus Weise, 1910 (Ecuador)
- Chalepus ventralis (Guérin-Méneville, 1844) (Bolivia)

== Fossil species ==
- Chalepus americanus (Wickham, 1914) (described as Odontota americanus) from Colorado.

== Selected former species ==
- Chalepus aeneiceps Pic, 1937
- Chalepus dorsalis
- Chalepus lineatus
