= Chalepus bacchus =

Scientific classification
- Kingdom: Animalia
- Phylum: Arthropoda
- Clade: Pancrustacea
- Class: Insecta
- Order: Coleoptera
- Suborder: Polyphaga
- Infraorder: Cucujiformia
- Family: Chrysomelidae
- Genus: Chalepus
- Species: C. bacchus

Binomial name
- Chalepus bacchus (Newman, 1840)

Synonyms
- Hispa bacchus Newman, 1840

Species of beetle

Chalepus bacchus is a species of beetle of the family Chrysomelidae. It is found in the United States (Alabama, Arkansas, Florida, Georgia, Indiana, Kentucky, Louisiana, Maryland, Mississippi, New Jersey, North Carolina, Ohio, South Carolina, Texas and Virginia).

== Biology ==
The foodplant is unknown, but adults have been found on grass, including Panicum repens.
