= Chalepus obidosensis =

Scientific classification
- Kingdom: Animalia
- Phylum: Arthropoda
- Clade: Pancrustacea
- Class: Insecta
- Order: Coleoptera
- Suborder: Polyphaga
- Infraorder: Cucujiformia
- Family: Chrysomelidae
- Genus: Chalepus
- Species: C. obidosensis

Binomial name
- Chalepus obidosensis Pic, 1929

Synonyms
- Chalepus obidosensis reducta Pic, 1931

Species of beetle

Chalepus obidosensis is a species of beetle of the family Chrysomelidae. It is found in Brazil.
