= Chalepus forticornis =

Scientific classification
- Kingdom: Animalia
- Phylum: Arthropoda
- Clade: Pancrustacea
- Class: Insecta
- Order: Coleoptera
- Suborder: Polyphaga
- Infraorder: Cucujiformia
- Family: Chrysomelidae
- Genus: Chalepus
- Species: C. forticornis

Binomial name
- Chalepus forticornis Weise, 1905

Synonyms
- Chalepus forticornis notatithorax Pic, 1931

Species of beetle

Chalepus forticornis is a species of beetle of the family Chrysomelidae. It is found in Brazil (Goyaz) and Paraguay.
