= Chalepus subcordiger =

Scientific classification
- Kingdom: Animalia
- Phylum: Arthropoda
- Clade: Pancrustacea
- Class: Insecta
- Order: Coleoptera
- Suborder: Polyphaga
- Infraorder: Cucujiformia
- Family: Chrysomelidae
- Genus: Chalepus
- Species: C. subcordiger

Binomial name
- Chalepus subcordiger Uhmann, 1935

Species of beetle

Chalepus subcordiger is a species of beetle of the family Chrysomelidae. It is found in Argentina and Paraguay.

== Biology ==
They have been recorded feeding on Arrabidea colecalyx, Aristolochia elegans and Actinostemon species.
