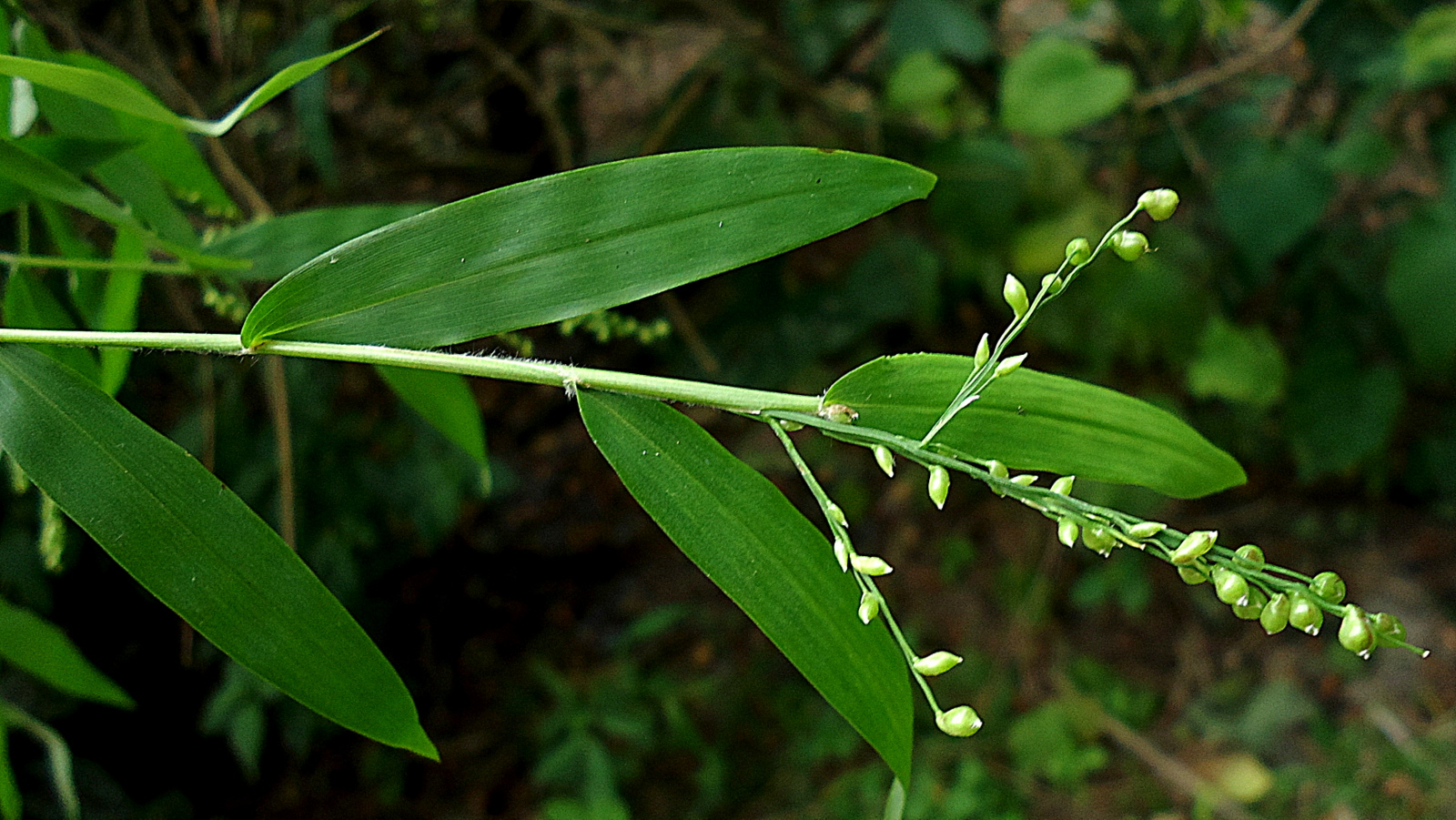

Scientific classification
- Kingdom: Plantae
- Clade: Tracheophytes
- Clade: Angiosperms
- Clade: Monocots
- Clade: Commelinids
- Order: Poales
- Family: Poaceae
- Subfamily: Panicoideae
- Genus: Lasiacis
- Species: L. ligulata

Binomial name
- Lasiacis ligulata Hitchc. & Chase

Synonyms
- Panicum divaricatum var. puberulum Griseb.; Panicum megacarpum Steud.

= Lasiacis ligulata =

Species of flowering plant

Lasiacis ligulata is a species of grass found in the Caribbean and Tropical South America.

== Taxonomy ==
Lasiacis ligulata was described by Albert Spear Hitchcock and Mary Agnes Chase in 1917. The type specimen was collected in Trinidad, between bushes by a stream.

== Description ==
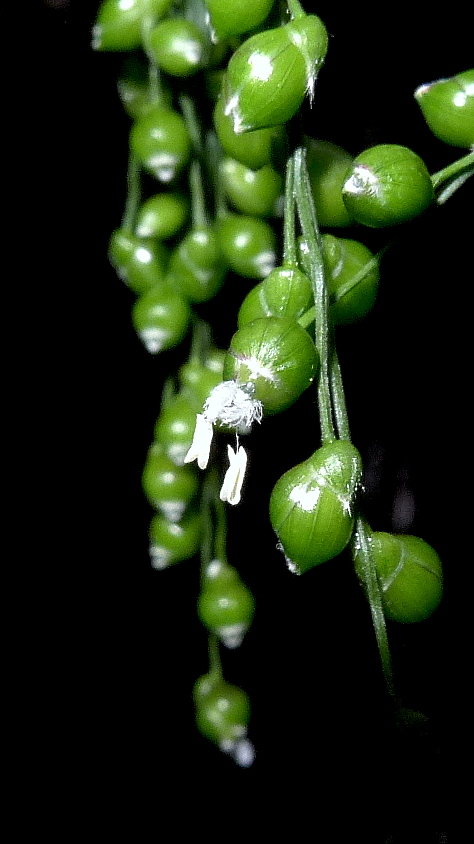
Close-up view of spikelets in a panicle

Lasiacis ligulata is a perennial, tuft-forming plant with rambling or climbing, woody culms that grow 1–5 m long and 6–13 mm thick. Leaf-blades are lanceolate, 7–14 cm long and 10–22 mm wide. The inflorescence is a 2–17 cm long panicle with individual spikelets containing one basal, sterile floret and one fertile floret.

== Distribution ==
The species is found from the Caribbean to northern and western South America, including Brazil.
