= Chalepus acuticornis =

Scientific classification
- Kingdom: Animalia
- Phylum: Arthropoda
- Clade: Pancrustacea
- Class: Insecta
- Order: Coleoptera
- Suborder: Polyphaga
- Infraorder: Cucujiformia
- Family: Chrysomelidae
- Genus: Chalepus
- Species: C. acuticornis

Binomial name
- Chalepus acuticornis (Chapuis, 1877)

Synonyms
- Odontota acuticornis Chapuis, 1877

Species of beetle

Chalepus acuticornis is a species of beetle of the family Chrysomelidae. It is found in Belize, Guatemala, Mexico (Jalisco, Tabasco, Veracruz, Yucatán) and Nicaragua.

== Biology ==
They have been recorded feeding on Aloysia gratissima and Bauhinia ungulata.
