= Chalepus digressus =

Scientific classification
- Kingdom: Animalia
- Phylum: Arthropoda
- Clade: Pancrustacea
- Class: Insecta
- Order: Coleoptera
- Suborder: Polyphaga
- Infraorder: Cucujiformia
- Family: Chrysomelidae
- Genus: Chalepus
- Species: C. digressus

Binomial name
- Chalepus digressus Baly, 1885

Species of beetle

Chalepus digressus is a species of beetle of the family Chrysomelidae. It is found in Costa Rica, Mexico (Jalisco, Guerrero, Morelos, Tabasco, Tamaulipas, Veracruz), Nicaragua and Venezuela.

== Description ==
The face between the eyes rather strongly produced, the front trisulcate. The antennae are robust and slightly but distinctly thickened towards the apex. The thorax is transverse, the sides converging from the base to the apex, bisinuate, distinctly angulate in the middle. The disc is transversely convex, closely rugose-punctate. The elytra are parallel, obtusely rounded at the apex, the lateral margin minutely serrulate, the apical border rather strongly denticulate. Each elytron has ten, the medial disc with nine, rows of punctures, the second, fourth, and eighth interspaces equally and rather strongly costate, the sixth subcostate at base and apex.

== Biology ==
They have been recorded feeding on Lasiacis nigra, Lasiacis procerrima and Lasiacis rustifolia.
