= Chalepus aeneicollis =

Scientific classification
- Kingdom: Animalia
- Phylum: Arthropoda
- Clade: Pancrustacea
- Class: Insecta
- Order: Coleoptera
- Suborder: Polyphaga
- Infraorder: Cucujiformia
- Family: Chrysomelidae
- Genus: Chalepus
- Species: C. aeneicollis

Binomial name
- Chalepus aeneicollis Uhmann, 1930

Species of beetle

Chalepus aeneicollis is a species of beetle of the family Chrysomelidae. It is found in Bolivia.
