= Chalepus assmanni =

Scientific classification
- Kingdom: Animalia
- Phylum: Arthropoda
- Clade: Pancrustacea
- Class: Insecta
- Order: Coleoptera
- Suborder: Polyphaga
- Infraorder: Cucujiformia
- Family: Chrysomelidae
- Genus: Chalepus
- Species: C. assmanni

Binomial name
- Chalepus assmanni Uhmann, 1936

Species of beetle

Chalepus assmanni is a species of beetle of the family Chrysomelidae. It is found in Costa Rica.
