= Chalepus tappesi =

Scientific classification
- Kingdom: Animalia
- Phylum: Arthropoda
- Clade: Pancrustacea
- Class: Insecta
- Order: Coleoptera
- Suborder: Polyphaga
- Infraorder: Cucujiformia
- Family: Chrysomelidae
- Genus: Chalepus
- Species: C. tappesi

Binomial name
- Chalepus tappesi (Chapuis, 1877)

Synonyms
- Odontota tappesi Chapuis, 1877; Chalepus contiguus Baly, 1885

Species of beetle

Chalepus tappesi is a species of beetle of the family Chrysomelidae. It is found in Colombia, Costa Rica and Panama.

== Description ==
The vertex and front are bisulcate and the interocular space is moderately produced. The antennae are more than one third the length of the body, filiform and slightly thickened towards the apex. The thorax is transverse, the sides nearly straight and parallel from the base to the middle, then obliquely converging and slightly rounded to the apex, above subcylindrical, transversely excavated on the hinder disc, deeply and somewhat closely punctured. The elytra are parallel, obsoletely constricted in the middle, serrulate, regularly rounded at the apex. Each elytron has ten, about the middle with eight, rows of punctures, the second, fourth, and eighth interspaces costate, the suture also elevated.
