= Chalepus aurantiacicollis =

Scientific classification
- Kingdom: Animalia
- Phylum: Arthropoda
- Clade: Pancrustacea
- Class: Insecta
- Order: Coleoptera
- Suborder: Polyphaga
- Infraorder: Cucujiformia
- Family: Chrysomelidae
- Genus: Chalepus
- Species: C. aurantiacicollis

Binomial name
- Chalepus aurantiacicollis Pic, 1931

Species of beetle

Chalepus aurantiacicollis is a species of beetle of the family Chrysomelidae. It is found in Brazil (Rio Grande do Sul) and Peru.
