= Chalepus verticalis =

Scientific classification
- Kingdom: Animalia
- Phylum: Arthropoda
- Clade: Pancrustacea
- Class: Insecta
- Order: Coleoptera
- Suborder: Polyphaga
- Infraorder: Cucujiformia
- Family: Chrysomelidae
- Genus: Chalepus
- Species: C. verticalis

Binomial name
- Chalepus verticalis (Chapuis, 1877)

Synonyms
- Odontota verticalis Chapuis, 1877; Chalepus propinquus Baly, 1885

Species of beetle

Chalepus verticalis is a species of beetle of the family Chrysomelidae. It is found in Guatemala, Mexico (Guerrero, Tabasco, Tamaulipas) and Nicaragua.

== Description ==
The head is smooth and impunctate, the hinder vertex sometimes fulvous and the front longitudinally grooved. The interocular space is moderately produced and angulate. The antennae are robust, filiform, scarcely thickened towards the apex and rather longer than the head and thorax. The thorax is transverse, the sides straight and parallel from the base to the middle, then rounded and narrowed to the apex, constricted just behind the latter, the anterior angle armed with a very short oblique tooth. The upper surface is transversely convex, slightly excavated transversely on the hinder disc, coarsely and closely punctured. The elytra are broader than the thorax, parallel on the sides, regularly rounded at the apex, the lateral margin obsoletely, the apical one distinctly, serrulate. Each elytron has ten rows of deep punctures, the second and fourth interspaces equally, the eighth less strongly, costate, the hinder portion of the sixth slightly elevated.

== Biology ==
They have been recorded feeding on Zea mays and Phaseolus species.
