= Chalepus bellulus =

Scientific classification
- Kingdom: Animalia
- Phylum: Arthropoda
- Clade: Pancrustacea
- Class: Insecta
- Order: Coleoptera
- Suborder: Polyphaga
- Infraorder: Cucujiformia
- Family: Chrysomelidae
- Genus: Chalepus
- Species: C. bellulus

Binomial name
- Chalepus bellulus (Chapuis, 1877)

Synonyms
- Odontota bellula Chapuis, 1877; Odontota tricolor Chapuis, 1877

Species of beetle

Chalepus bellulus is a species of leaf beetle in the family Chrysomelidae. It is found in Central America and North America, where it has been recorded from Costa Rica, El Salvador, Mexico (Guerrero, Morelos, Oaxaca, Tabasco, Tamaulipas, Veracruz), Nicaragua, Panama and the United States (Arizona, Texas).

== Description ==
The head is smooth and impunctate, the vertex and front impressed in the medial line with a deep longitudinal groove and the front produced between the eyes into a conical process. The antennae are half the length of the body, robust, filiform and slightly thickened towards the first and second joints. The thorax is broader than long, the sides obtusely angulate-subrotundate, nearly parallel from the base to the middle, then obliquely converging to the apex. The anterior angle is armed with a very short subacute tooth and the upper surface is subcylindrical, broadly excavated transversely on the hinder disc, coarsely and deeply foveolate-punctate. The medial line has an ill-defined shallow longitudinal groove. The elytra are subelongate, parallel, slightly constricted on the sides, the concavity extending from the shoulder to the posterior angle. The outer margin is serrulate, the apex rounded and rather more strongly serrulate than the sides. Each elytron has ten rows of deep punctures, the ninth and tenth irregular, and the seventh and eighth entirely obsolete in their middle third, the second, fourth, and eighth interspaces strongly costate, the suture also thickened, blackish-aeneous. There is a broad vitta on the inner disc, confluent at the base with its fellow on the opposite elytron, and extending from the basal margin to below the middle of the elytron, fulvous.

== Biology ==
The foodplant is unknown, but adults have been collected from Digitaria eriantha, Oryza species, Digitaria decumbens, Panicum purpurascens and Phaseolus species.
