= Chalepus amabilis =

Scientific classification
- Kingdom: Animalia
- Phylum: Arthropoda
- Clade: Pancrustacea
- Class: Insecta
- Order: Coleoptera
- Suborder: Polyphaga
- Infraorder: Cucujiformia
- Family: Chrysomelidae
- Genus: Chalepus
- Species: C. amabilis

Binomial name
- Chalepus amabilis Baly, 1885

Species of beetle

Chalepus amabilis is a species of beetle of the family Chrysomelidae. It is found in Belize, Colombia, El Salvador, Mexico (Jalisco, Morelos, Oaxaca, Tamaulipas) and Nicaragua.

== Description ==
The face is strongly produced between the eyes, the front deeply trisulcate. The antennae are moderately robust, filiform and slightly thickened towards the apex. The thorax is slightly broader than long and conic, the sides nearly straight, obsoletely angulate in the middle. The disc is subcylindrical, transversely excavated behind the middle, closely rugose-punctate. The elytra are parallel, regularly rounded at the apex, the sides finely serrulate, the apical margin narrowly dilated, acutely denticulate. Each elytron has ten, the medial disc with nine, rows of punctures, the second and fourth interspaces rather strongly and equally costate, the eighth less strongly elevated, the sixth obsoletely costate at base and apex.

== Biology ==
They have been recorded feeding on Chusquea species, Lasiacis nigra, Lasiacis procerrima, Lasiacis ruscifolia and Panicum species.
