= Chalepus angulosus =

Scientific classification
- Kingdom: Animalia
- Phylum: Arthropoda
- Clade: Pancrustacea
- Class: Insecta
- Order: Coleoptera
- Suborder: Polyphaga
- Infraorder: Cucujiformia
- Family: Chrysomelidae
- Genus: Chalepus
- Species: C. angulosus

Binomial name
- Chalepus angulosus Baly, 1885

Species of beetle

Chalepus angulosus is a species of beetle of the family Chrysomelidae. It is found in Colombia, Costa Rica, Guatemala, Mexico (Tabasco) and Panama.

== Description ==
The vertex and front are opaque and trisulcate and the interocular space is rather strongly produced, its apex angulate. The antennae are nearly half the length of the body, tapering at base and apex. The thorax is transverse, the sides angulate, nearly straight, obsoletely sinuate behind the middle, converging and distinctly sinuate from there to the apex, the apical angle laterally acute. The upper surface is transversely convex, transversely depressed on the hinder disc and again obsoletely before the middle, vaguely but somewhat closely punctured. The elytra are nearly parallel, obsoletely dilated towards the posterior angle, rounded at the apex, the lateral margin obsoletely, the apical one distinctly, serrulate. Each elytron has ten rows of punctures, the second, fourth, and eighth interspaces, together with the basal portion of the sixth, costate.
