= Chalepus pici =

Scientific classification
- Kingdom: Animalia
- Phylum: Arthropoda
- Clade: Pancrustacea
- Class: Insecta
- Order: Coleoptera
- Suborder: Polyphaga
- Infraorder: Cucujiformia
- Family: Chrysomelidae
- Genus: Chalepus
- Species: C. pici

Binomial name
- Chalepus pici Descarpentries & Villiers, 1959

Synonyms
- Chalepus quadricostatus reductus Pic, 1932

Species of beetle

Chalepus pici is a species of beetle of the family Chrysomelidae. It is found in Belize, Brazil, Costa Rica, El Salvador, Mexico (Guerrero, Puebla, Querétaro, Tamaulipas, Veracruz), Nicaragua and Panama.
