= Chalepus subparallelus =

Scientific classification
- Kingdom: Animalia
- Phylum: Arthropoda
- Clade: Pancrustacea
- Class: Insecta
- Order: Coleoptera
- Suborder: Polyphaga
- Infraorder: Cucujiformia
- Family: Chrysomelidae
- Genus: Chalepus
- Species: C. subparallelus

Binomial name
- Chalepus subparallelus Baly, 1885

Species of beetle

Chalepus subparallelus is a species of beetle of the family Chrysomelidae. It is found in Mexico (Oaxaca).

== Description ==
The vertex and front are irregularly grooved and the interocular space is strongly produced. The antennae are about one third the length of the body, filiform and slightly thickened towards the apex. The thorax is transverse, the sides nearly straight and very slightly converging behind the middle, then obliquely converging and slightly rounded to the apex, notched at the anterior angle, the latter armed laterally with a very short acute tooth. The upper surface is subcylindrical, rather deeply excavated transversely on the hinder disc, closely and strongly punctured, the medial line with a very fine longitudinal groove. The elytra are narrowly elongate-ovate, the sides slightly rounded, finely serrulate, the apex regularly rounded, angulate-emarginate at the sutural angle, distinctly serrulate. Each elytron has ten rows of punctures, the second and fourth interspaces distinctly, the sixth at base and apex, together with the eighth entirely, obsoletely costate.
