= Chalepus marginatus =

Scientific classification
- Kingdom: Animalia
- Phylum: Arthropoda
- Clade: Pancrustacea
- Class: Insecta
- Order: Coleoptera
- Suborder: Polyphaga
- Infraorder: Cucujiformia
- Family: Chrysomelidae
- Genus: Chalepus
- Species: C. marginatus

Binomial name
- Chalepus marginatus Baly, 1885

Species of beetle

Chalepus marginatus is a species of beetle of the family Chrysomelidae. It is found in Mexico (Veracruz).
