= Chalepus subhumeralis =

Scientific classification
- Kingdom: Animalia
- Phylum: Arthropoda
- Clade: Pancrustacea
- Class: Insecta
- Order: Coleoptera
- Suborder: Polyphaga
- Infraorder: Cucujiformia
- Family: Chrysomelidae
- Genus: Chalepus
- Species: C. subhumeralis

Binomial name
- Chalepus subhumeralis Baly, 1885

Species of beetle

Chalepus subhumeralis is a species of beetle of the family Chrysomelidae. It is found in Costa Rica, Mexico (Tabasco, Veracruz) and Nicaragua.

== Description ==
The front is impressed with a broad longitudinal fovea and the interocular space is moderately produced, its apex angulate, with a small obscure rufo-piceous patch above the antennae. The antennae themselves are rather more than one third the length of the body and slightly thickened towards the apex. The thorax is transverse, the sides angulate, straight and parallel behind the middle, then obliquely converging and faintly sinuate to the apex. The anterior angle is armed laterally with a small subacute tooth and the upper surface is subcylindrical, rather deeply excavated transversely on the hinder disc, strongly and deeply punctured. The elytra are parallel, regularly rounded at the apex, the outer margin very finely serrulate. Each elytron has ten rows of punctures, the second and fourth interspaces rather strongly, the eighth less distinctly, costate.
