= Chalepus panici =

Scientific classification
- Kingdom: Animalia
- Phylum: Arthropoda
- Clade: Pancrustacea
- Class: Insecta
- Order: Coleoptera
- Suborder: Polyphaga
- Infraorder: Cucujiformia
- Family: Chrysomelidae
- Genus: Chalepus
- Species: C. panici

Binomial name
- Chalepus panici Uhmann, 1950

Species of beetle

Chalepus panici is a species of beetle of the family Chrysomelidae. It is found in Venezuela.

== Biology ==
They have been recorded feeding on Panicum species.
