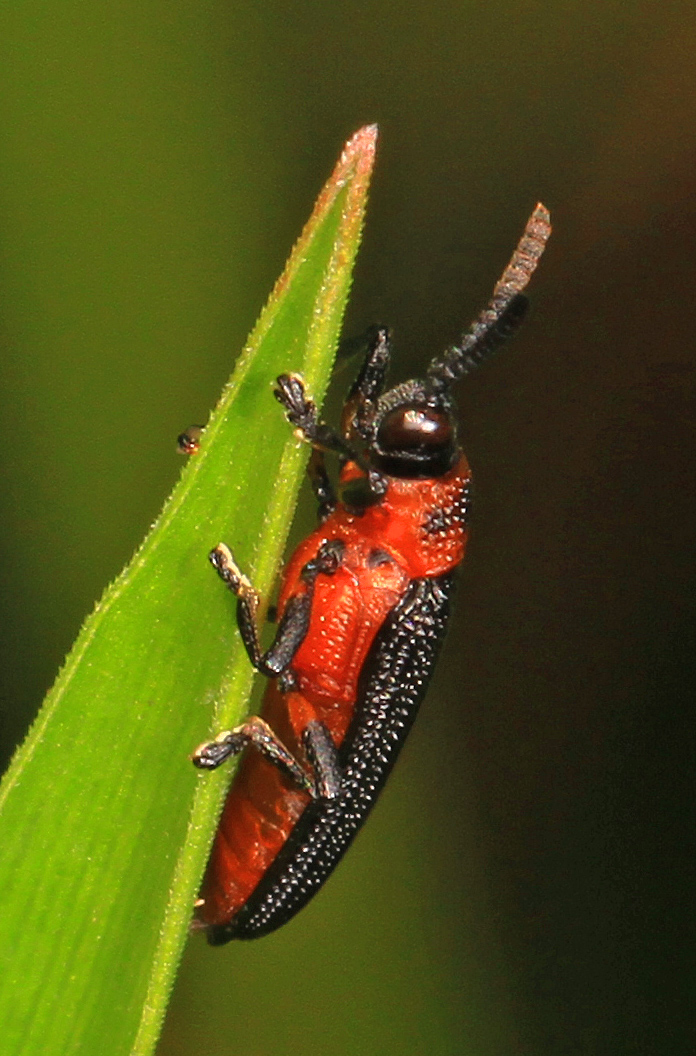

Scientific classification
- Kingdom: Animalia
- Phylum: Arthropoda
- Clade: Pancrustacea
- Class: Insecta
- Order: Coleoptera
- Suborder: Polyphaga
- Infraorder: Cucujiformia
- Family: Chrysomelidae
- Genus: Chalepus
- Species: C. bicolor

Binomial name
- Chalepus bicolor (Olivier, 1792)

Synonyms
- Hispa bicolor Olivier, 1792; Chalepus rufogaster Thunberg, 1805; Odontota rufiventris Suffrian, 1868

= Chalepus bicolor =

Species of beetle

Chalepus bicolor is a species of leaf beetle in the family Chrysomelidae. It is found in North America, where it has been recorded from Canada (Ontario) and the United States (Alabama, Arkansas, Connecticut, Delaware, District of Columbia, Florida, Georgia, Illinois, Indiana, Kansas, Kentucky, Louisiana, Maryland, Massachusetts, Michigan, Mississippi, Missouri, New Jersey, New York, North Carolina, Ohio, Oklahoma, Pennsylvania, Rhode Island, South Carolina, Tennessee, Texas, Virginia, West Virginia).

== Description ==
Adults reach a length of about 6.3‒7.6 mm. They have a red pronotum, while the elytron is dark.

== Biology ==
They have been recorded feeding on Dichanthelium clandestinum, Dichanthelium nitidum, Panicum microcarpon and Panicum oligosanthes.
