= Chalepus walshii =

Scientific classification
- Kingdom: Animalia
- Phylum: Arthropoda
- Clade: Pancrustacea
- Class: Insecta
- Order: Coleoptera
- Suborder: Polyphaga
- Infraorder: Cucujiformia
- Family: Chrysomelidae
- Genus: Chalepus
- Species: C. walshii

Binomial name
- Chalepus walshii (Crotch, 1873)

Synonyms
- Odontota walshii Crotch, 1873; Hispa collaris Say, 1823; Chalepus walshii sayi Butte, 1968

Species of beetle

Chalepus walshii is a species of leaf beetle in the family Chrysomelidae. It is found in North America, where it has been recorded from Canada (Ontario) and the United States (Arizona, Colorado, Connecticut, Florida, Illinois, Indiana, Kansas, Maine, Maryland, Massachusetts, Michigan, Minnesota, Missouri, New Hampshire, Nebraska, New Jersey, New Mexico, New York, North Carolina, Pennsylvania, Rhode Island, South Carolina, Texas, Vermont, West Virginia, Wisconsin).

== Biology ==
They have been recorded feeding on Elymus villosus, Hystrix patula and Calmamagrostis canadensis. Adults have been collected on Bromus species (including Bromus anomalus).
