= Chalepus bicoloriceps =

Scientific classification
- Kingdom: Animalia
- Phylum: Arthropoda
- Clade: Pancrustacea
- Class: Insecta
- Order: Coleoptera
- Suborder: Polyphaga
- Infraorder: Cucujiformia
- Family: Chrysomelidae
- Genus: Chalepus
- Species: C. bicoloriceps

Binomial name
- Chalepus bicoloriceps Pic, 1931

Species of beetle

Chalepus bicoloriceps is a species of beetle of the family Chrysomelidae. It is found in Peru.
