= Chalepus viduus =

Scientific classification
- Kingdom: Animalia
- Phylum: Arthropoda
- Clade: Pancrustacea
- Class: Insecta
- Order: Coleoptera
- Suborder: Polyphaga
- Infraorder: Cucujiformia
- Family: Chrysomelidae
- Genus: Chalepus
- Species: C. viduus

Binomial name
- Chalepus viduus Weise, 1905

Synonyms
- Chalepus subfasciatus Pic, 1931; Chalepus pauli submarginalis Pic, 1932

Species of beetle

Chalepus viduus is a species of beetle of the family Chrysomelidae. It is found in Bolivia, Brazil, Ecuador and Peru.
