= Chalepus amiculus =

Scientific classification
- Kingdom: Animalia
- Phylum: Arthropoda
- Clade: Pancrustacea
- Class: Insecta
- Order: Coleoptera
- Suborder: Polyphaga
- Infraorder: Cucujiformia
- Family: Chrysomelidae
- Genus: Chalepus
- Species: C. amiculus

Binomial name
- Chalepus amiculus Baly, 1885

Species of beetle

Chalepus amiculus is a species of beetle of the family Chrysomelidae. It is found in Panama.

== Description ==
The head is moderately produced between the eyes and the front is longitudinally sulcate on the medial line and irregularly sculptured on either side. The antennae are half the length of the body and slightly thickened towards the apex. The thorax is longer than broad, the sides rounded, nearly straight and parallel from the base to the middle, sinuate just behind the latter, constricted in front, the anterior angle produced obliquely into a subacute tooth. The upper surface is transversely convex, slightly excavated on the hinder disc, closely foveolate-punctate. The lateral margin, together with a broad discoidal vitta, is black. The elytra are broader than the thorax, the sides parallel, obsoletely constricted in the middle, the apex regularly rounded. The lateral margin is obsoletely, the apical one more distinctly, serrulate. Each elytron has ten rows of punctures, the second, fourth, sixth, and eighth interspaces costate, the sixth less strongly raised, its margin serrulate.
