= Chalepus lineola =

Scientific classification
- Kingdom: Animalia
- Phylum: Arthropoda
- Clade: Pancrustacea
- Class: Insecta
- Order: Coleoptera
- Suborder: Polyphaga
- Infraorder: Cucujiformia
- Family: Chrysomelidae
- Genus: Chalepus
- Species: C. lineola

Binomial name
- Chalepus lineola (Chapuis, 1877)

Synonyms
- Odontota lineola Chapuis, 1877; Chalepus zikani Uhmann, 1935

Species of beetle

Chalepus lineola is a species of beetle of the family Chrysomelidae. It is found in Brazil (Amazonas).
