= Chalepus cordiger =

Scientific classification
- Kingdom: Animalia
- Phylum: Arthropoda
- Clade: Pancrustacea
- Class: Insecta
- Order: Coleoptera
- Suborder: Polyphaga
- Infraorder: Cucujiformia
- Family: Chrysomelidae
- Genus: Chalepus
- Species: C. cordiger

Binomial name
- Chalepus cordiger (Chapuis, 1877)

Synonyms
- Odontota cordiger Chapuis, 1877

Species of beetle

Chalepus cordiger is a species of beetle of the family Chrysomelidae. It is found in Argentina, Brazil (Bahia, Rio Grande do Sul, São Paulo) and Paraguay.

== Biology ==
They have been recorded feeding on Olyra species, Cordia salicifolia and Valota insularis.
