= Chalepus vicinalis =

Scientific classification
- Kingdom: Animalia
- Phylum: Arthropoda
- Clade: Pancrustacea
- Class: Insecta
- Order: Coleoptera
- Suborder: Polyphaga
- Infraorder: Cucujiformia
- Family: Chrysomelidae
- Genus: Chalepus
- Species: C. vicinalis

Binomial name
- Chalepus vicinalis Baly, 1885

Species of beetle

Chalepus vicinalis is a species of beetle of the family Chrysomelidae. It is found in Colombia and Panama.

== Description ==
The vertex and front are impunctate, the latter trisulcate. The interocular space is rather strongly produced. The antennae are more than one third the length of the body, robust and thickened towards the apex. The thorax is transverse, the sides angulate, bisinuate, nearly parallel from the base to the middle, then obliquely converging to the apex. The disc is subcylindrical, transversely excavated behind, deeply impressed with large round punctures. The elytra is parallel, regularly rounded at the apex, the sides obsoletely serrulate, apical margin denticulate. Each elytron has ten, the medial disc with eight or nine, rows of punctures, the sixth and seventh rows being more or less obsolete in the middle part of their second, fourth, and eighth interspaces rather strongly costate, sixth interspace slightly elevated at base and apex.
