= Chalepus flexuosus =

Scientific classification
- Kingdom: Animalia
- Phylum: Arthropoda
- Clade: Pancrustacea
- Class: Insecta
- Order: Coleoptera
- Suborder: Polyphaga
- Infraorder: Cucujiformia
- Family: Chrysomelidae
- Genus: Chalepus
- Species: C. flexuosus

Binomial name
- Chalepus flexuosus (Guérin-Méneville, 1844)

Synonyms
- Odontota flexuosa Guérin-Méneville, 1844; Chalepus robusticornis Pic, 1931; Chalepus flexuosus bahiana Pic, 1931; Chalepus (Xenochalepus) flexuosus sublateralis Pic, 1932

Species of beetle

Chalepus flexuosus is a species of beetle of the family Chrysomelidae. It is found in Argentina, Bolivia, Brazil (Bahia, Goyaz, Rio Grande do Sul) and Paraguay.
