= Chalepus brevicornis =

Scientific classification
- Kingdom: Animalia
- Phylum: Arthropoda
- Clade: Pancrustacea
- Class: Insecta
- Order: Coleoptera
- Suborder: Polyphaga
- Infraorder: Cucujiformia
- Family: Chrysomelidae
- Genus: Chalepus
- Species: C. brevicornis

Binomial name
- Chalepus brevicornis (Baly, 1885)

Synonyms
- Parachalepus brevicornis Baly, 1885

Species of beetle

Chalepus brevicornis is a species of beetle of the family Chrysomelidae. It is found in Belize, Guatemala, Mexico (Veracruz) and Nicaragua.
