= Chalepus nigripictus =

Scientific classification
- Kingdom: Animalia
- Phylum: Arthropoda
- Clade: Pancrustacea
- Class: Insecta
- Order: Coleoptera
- Suborder: Polyphaga
- Infraorder: Cucujiformia
- Family: Chrysomelidae
- Genus: Chalepus
- Species: C. nigripictus

Binomial name
- Chalepus nigripictus Baly, 1885

Species of beetle

Chalepus nigripictus is a species of beetle of the family Chrysomelidae. It is found in Costa Rica and Panama.

== Description ==
The front is deeply trisulcate and the interocular space is strongly produced, its apex angulate. The antennae are nearly half the length of the body, robust and fusiform. The thorax is broader than long and subconic, the sides obliquely converging from base to apex, constricted before the middle, anterior angle armed laterally with a short obtuse tooth, subcylindrical, flattened and broadly excavated on the hinder disc, impressed with large round punctures, well defined on the medial disc, shallower and less distinct on the sides. The elytra are elongate, parallel, the apex regularly rounded, entire. The lateral margin is serrulate, the apical border armed with regularly placed acute teeth, above convex, flattened along the suture. Each elytron has ten, in the middle with nine, rows of large deeply impressed punctures, the suture, together with the second, fourth, sixth, and eighth interspaces, costate, the sixth interrupted on its middle third, fulvous. The apical third, a sutural vitta, together with a short line on the humeral callus, black. The legs are elongate, the apices of the anterior tibiae thickened.
