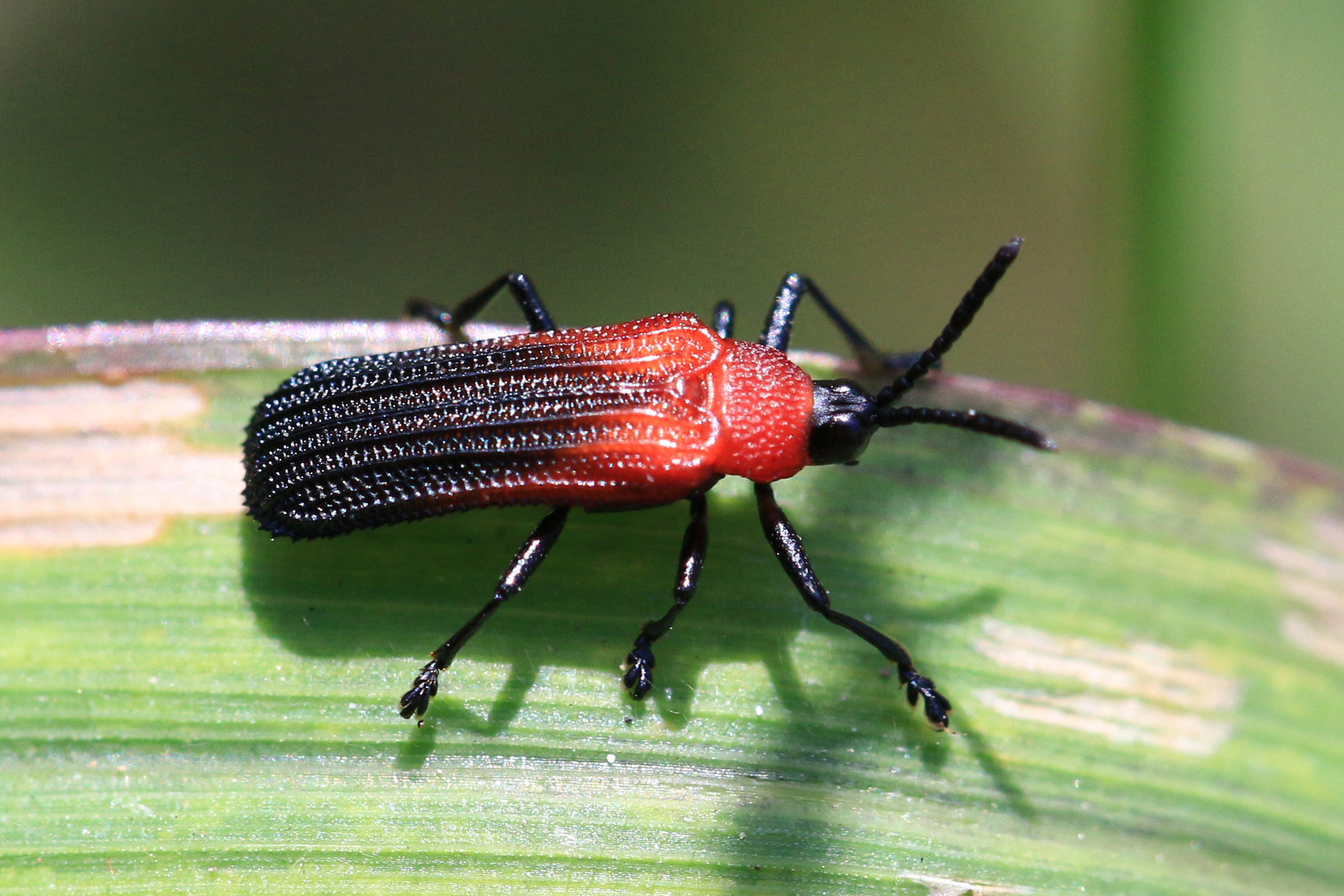

Scientific classification
- Kingdom: Animalia
- Phylum: Arthropoda
- Clade: Pancrustacea
- Class: Insecta
- Order: Coleoptera
- Suborder: Polyphaga
- Infraorder: Cucujiformia
- Family: Chrysomelidae
- Genus: Chalepus
- Species: C. sanguinicollis

Binomial name
- Chalepus sanguinicollis (Linnaeus, 1771)

Synonyms
- Chalepus hebalus Sanderson, 1951; Hispa sanguinicollis Linnaeus, 1771; Odontota stigmula Chapuis, 1877; Hispa axillaris Dejean, 1821; Chalepus sanguinicollis australis Uhmann, 1935; Cephaloleia microdonta Fairmaire, 1869

= Chalepus sanguinicollis =

Species of beetle

Chalepus sanguinicollis is a species of leaf beetle in the family Chrysomelidae. It is found in the Caribbean Sea, North America, and South America.

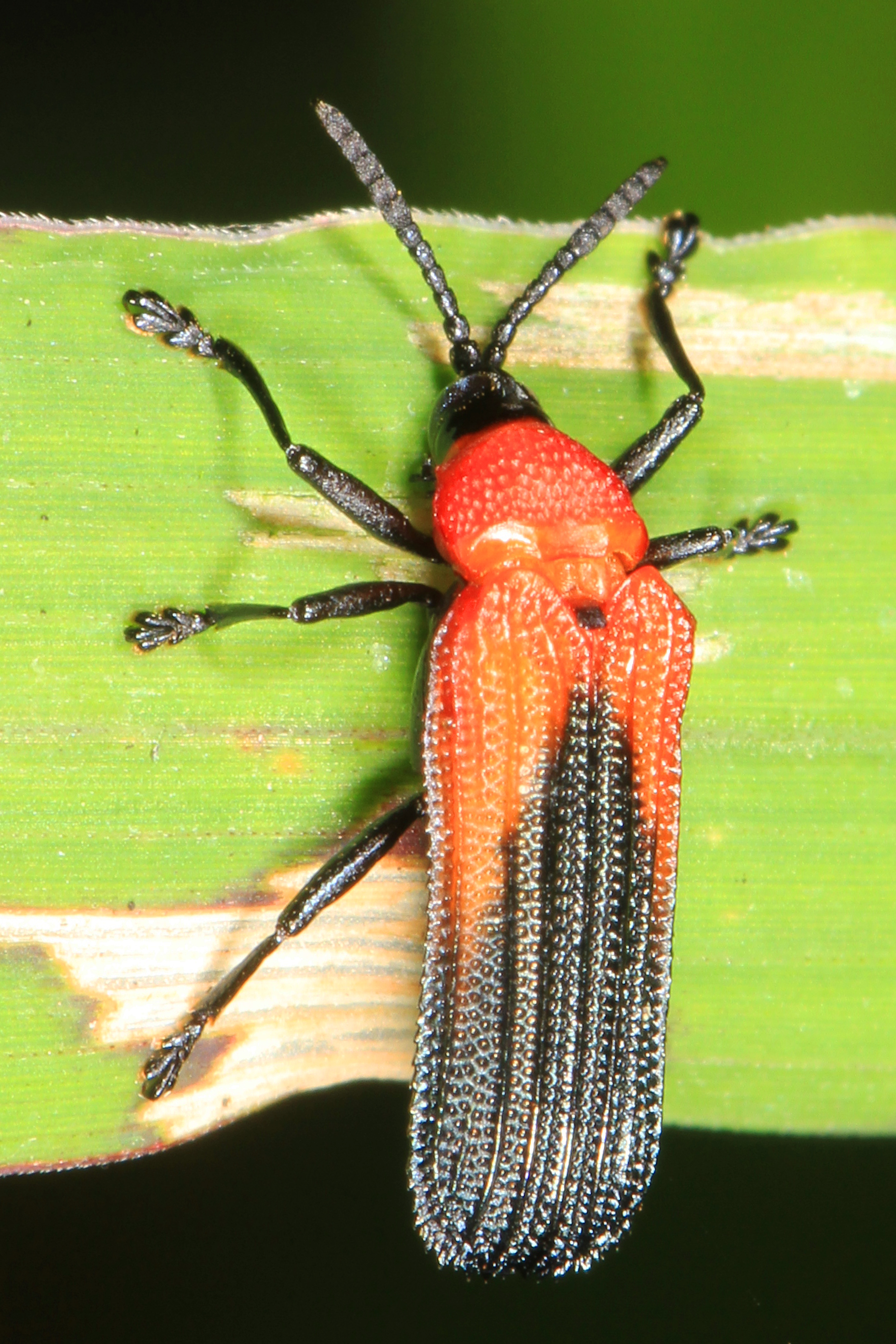

== Biology ==
They have been recorded feeding on Panicum leucophaeum and Paspalum densum. Adults have been collected on Verbesinae greenmanni, Benthamantha mollis, Bromelia caragua, Vitex cimosa, Valota insularis, Calea pinnatifida and Crotalaria species.
