= Chalepus marginiventris =

Scientific classification
- Kingdom: Animalia
- Phylum: Arthropoda
- Clade: Pancrustacea
- Class: Insecta
- Order: Coleoptera
- Suborder: Polyphaga
- Infraorder: Cucujiformia
- Family: Chrysomelidae
- Genus: Chalepus
- Species: C. marginiventris

Binomial name
- Chalepus marginiventris (Chapuis, 1877)

Synonyms
- Odontota marginiventris Chapuis, 1877; Odontota sternalis Chapuis, 1877; Chalepus mineiroensis Pic, 1932; Chalepus marginiventris strandi Uhmann, 1936; Chalepus marginiventris barberi Uhmann, 1958

Species of beetle

Chalepus marginiventris is a species of beetle of the family Chrysomelidae. It is found in Argentina and Brazil (Bahia, Goyaz, Matto Grosso, Paraná, Rio de Janeiro, Rio Grande do Sul, São Paulo).
