= Chalepus cincticollis =

Scientific classification
- Kingdom: Animalia
- Phylum: Arthropoda
- Clade: Pancrustacea
- Class: Insecta
- Order: Coleoptera
- Suborder: Polyphaga
- Infraorder: Cucujiformia
- Family: Chrysomelidae
- Genus: Chalepus
- Species: C. cincticollis

Binomial name
- Chalepus cincticollis Weise, 1905

Species of beetle

Chalepus cincticollis is a species of beetle of the family Chrysomelidae. It is found in Bolivia, Brazil (Amazonas), Ecuador, French Guiana and Peru.
