= Chalepus weyersi =

Scientific classification
- Kingdom: Animalia
- Phylum: Arthropoda
- Clade: Pancrustacea
- Class: Insecta
- Order: Coleoptera
- Suborder: Polyphaga
- Infraorder: Cucujiformia
- Family: Chrysomelidae
- Genus: Chalepus
- Species: C. weyersi

Binomial name
- Chalepus weyersi (Chapuis, 1877)

Synonyms
- Odontota weyersi Chapuis, 1877

Species of beetle

Chalepus weyersi is a species of beetle of the family Chrysomelidae. It is found in Colombia and Panama.
