= Chalepus porosus =

Scientific classification
- Kingdom: Animalia
- Phylum: Arthropoda
- Clade: Pancrustacea
- Class: Insecta
- Order: Coleoptera
- Suborder: Polyphaga
- Infraorder: Cucujiformia
- Family: Chrysomelidae
- Genus: Chalepus
- Species: C. porosus

Binomial name
- Chalepus porosus (Germar, 1824)

Synonyms
- Hispa porosa Germar, 1824; Odontota tenuis Chapuis, 1877

Species of beetle

Chalepus porosus is a species of beetle of the family Chrysomelidae. It is found in Brazil (Bahia, Pernambuco) and Peru.

== Biology ==
They have been recorded feeding on Fabaceae species.
