= Chalepus clypeatus =

Scientific classification
- Kingdom: Animalia
- Phylum: Arthropoda
- Clade: Pancrustacea
- Class: Insecta
- Order: Coleoptera
- Suborder: Polyphaga
- Infraorder: Cucujiformia
- Family: Chrysomelidae
- Genus: Chalepus
- Species: C. clypeatus

Binomial name
- Chalepus clypeatus Baly, 1885

Species of beetle

Chalepus clypeatus is a species of beetle of the family Chrysomelidae. It is found in Nicaragua.

== Description ==
The head is strongly produced between the eyes and the front is deeply sulcate, while the clypeus is quadrate-elongate, thickened and coarsely and deeply punctured. The antennae are robust and subfusiform. The thorax is transverse, the sides straight and slightly converging from the base to beyond the middle, then obliquely converging and sinuate to the apex, apical angle armed laterally with a very short acute tooth. The upper surface is transversely convex, excavated transversely behind the middle, coarsely and irregularly punctured. The elytra are parallel, serrulate on the sides, rounded at the apex, the apical margin armed with a number of strong acute teeth. Each elytron has ten regular rows of punctures, the second, fourth, and eighth interspaces costate, the apex of the sixth subcostate.
