= Chalepus similatus =

Scientific classification
- Kingdom: Animalia
- Phylum: Arthropoda
- Clade: Pancrustacea
- Class: Insecta
- Order: Coleoptera
- Suborder: Polyphaga
- Infraorder: Cucujiformia
- Family: Chrysomelidae
- Genus: Chalepus
- Species: C. similatus

Binomial name
- Chalepus similatus Baly, 1885

Species of beetle

Chalepus similatus is a species of beetle of the family Chrysomelidae. It is found in Guatemala, Nicaragua and Panama.

== Description ==
The head is smooth and shining, faintly tinged with aeneous and the front is moderately produced and trisulcate, its anterior portion covered with an ill-defined fulvo-piceous patch. The antennae are rather more than one third the length of the body, filiform and slightly thickened towards the apex. The thorax is about one third broader than long, the sides nearly straight and parallel from the base to the middle, then obliquely converging to the anterior angle armed with a very short obtuse tooth, above subcylindrical, closely covered with large foveolate punctures, the hinder disc flattened. The upper surface, together with the sides beneath is fulvous. The apical and lateral margins, together with the basal lobe, are narrowly edged with piceous. The elytra are parallel, rounded at the apex, finely serrulate, the apical serratures not coarser than those on the lateral margin. Each elytron has ten rows of large deeply impressed round punctures, the rows entire others, the second, fourth, and eighth interspaces, together with the suture, strongly costate the sixth interspace below its middle also raised, but much less distinctly so than the middle disc covered with a broad fulvous vitta, which extends downwards from the basal margin to the middle of the elytra.
