= Chalepus badeni =

Scientific classification
- Kingdom: Animalia
- Phylum: Arthropoda
- Clade: Pancrustacea
- Class: Insecta
- Order: Coleoptera
- Suborder: Polyphaga
- Infraorder: Cucujiformia
- Family: Chrysomelidae
- Genus: Chalepus
- Species: C. badeni

Binomial name
- Chalepus badeni (Chapuis, 1877)

Synonyms
- Odontota badeni Chapuis, 1877

Species of beetle

Chalepus badeni is a species of beetle of the family Chrysomelidae. It is found in the former British West Indies, as well as in Colombia and Trinidad.

== Biology ==
They have been recorded feeding on Phaseolus vulgaris.
