= Chalepus alternevittatus =

Scientific classification
- Kingdom: Animalia
- Phylum: Arthropoda
- Clade: Pancrustacea
- Class: Insecta
- Order: Coleoptera
- Suborder: Polyphaga
- Infraorder: Cucujiformia
- Family: Chrysomelidae
- Genus: Chalepus
- Species: C. alternevittatus

Binomial name
- Chalepus alternevittatus Pic, 1932

Synonyms
- Chalepus alternevittatus inlateralis Pic, 1932

Species of beetle

Chalepus alternevittatus is a species of beetle of the family Chrysomelidae. It is found in Brazil and Peru.
