= Chalepus perplexus =

Scientific classification
- Kingdom: Animalia
- Phylum: Arthropoda
- Clade: Pancrustacea
- Class: Insecta
- Order: Coleoptera
- Suborder: Polyphaga
- Infraorder: Cucujiformia
- Family: Chrysomelidae
- Genus: Chalepus
- Species: C. perplexus

Binomial name
- Chalepus perplexus (Chapuis, 1877)

Synonyms
- Odontota perplexa Chapuis, 1877

Species of beetle

Chalepus perplexus is a species of beetle of the family Chrysomelidae. It is found in Brazil.
