= Chalepus rufiventris =

Scientific classification
- Kingdom: Animalia
- Phylum: Arthropoda
- Clade: Pancrustacea
- Class: Insecta
- Order: Coleoptera
- Suborder: Polyphaga
- Infraorder: Cucujiformia
- Family: Chrysomelidae
- Genus: Chalepus
- Species: C. rufiventris

Binomial name
- Chalepus rufiventris (Suffrian, 1868)

Synonyms
- Odontota rufiventris Suffrian, 1868

Species of beetle

Chalepus rufiventris is a species of beetle of the family Chrysomelidae. It is found in Cuba.
