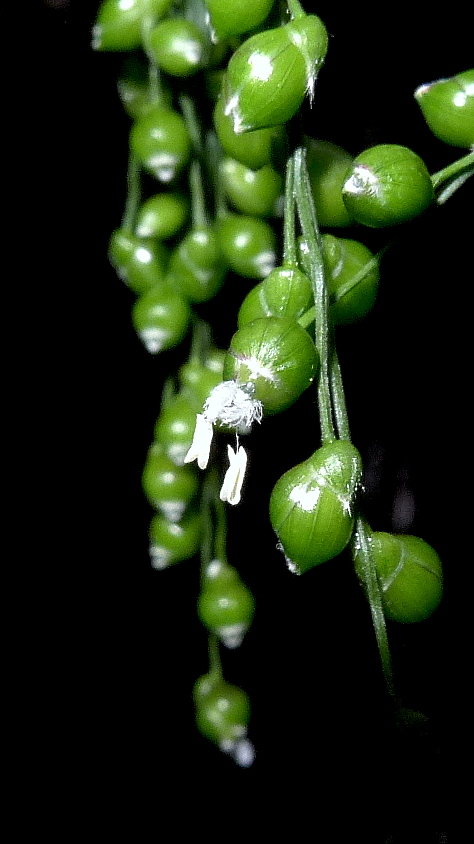
- Lasiacis ligulata

Scientific classification
- Kingdom: Plantae
- Clade: Tracheophytes
- Clade: Angiosperms
- Clade: Monocots
- Clade: Commelinids
- Order: Poales
- Family: Poaceae
- Subfamily: Panicoideae
- Supertribe: Panicodae
- Tribe: Paniceae
- Subtribe: Boivinellinae
- Genus: Lasiacis (Griseb.) Hitchc.

Type species
- Panicum divaricatum L.

Synonyms
- Panicum section Lasiacis Griseb.; Panicum series. Lasiacis (Griseb.) Benth. & Hook.f.

= Lasiacis =

Genus of grasses

Lasiacis (smallcane) is a genus of Neotropical plants in the grass family, found in the Americas from Mexico and Florida south to Argentina.

== Species ==
15 species are accepted.

- Lasiacis anomala Hitchc. - Trinidad, Venezuela, Guayana, Suriname, Brazil, Colombia, Bolivia
- Lasiacis divaricata (L.) Hitchc. - widespread from Mexico and Florida south to Argentina
- Lasiacis grisebachii (Nash) Hitchc. - Mexico, Central America, Cuba, Puerto Rico
- Lasiacis ligulata Hitchc. & Chase - South America, West Indies
- Lasiacis linearis Swallen - Central America, Chiapas
- Lasiacis maculata (Aubl.) Urb. - widespread from Mexico and Cuba south to Argentina
- Lasiacis nigra Davidse - Mexico, Central America, northwestern South America
- Lasiacis oaxacensis (Steud.) Hitchc. ex Chase - Mexico, Central America, northwestern South America, Jamaica, Hispaniola
- Lasiacis procerrima (Hack.) Hitchc. ex Chase - Mexico, Central America, northwestern South America
- Lasiacis rhizophora (E.Fourn.) Hitchc. ex Chase - Mexico, Central America, northwestern South America, Greater Antilles
- Lasiacis rugelii (Griseb.) Hitchc. - Mexico, Central America, Hispaniola, Cuba
- Lasiacis ruscifolia (Kunth) Hitchc. ex Chase - Florida, Mexico, Central America, northwestern South America, West Indies
- Lasiacis scabrior Hitchc. - Mexico, Central America, northwestern South America
- Lasiacis sloanei (Griseb.) Hitchc. - Mexico, Central America, northwestern South America, West Indies
- Lasiacis standleyi Hitchc. - Mexico, Central America, northwestern South America

== formerly included ==
see Acroceras

- Lasiacis excavata - Acroceras excavatum
