= Hay =

Dried grass, legumes or other herbaceous plants used as animal fodder

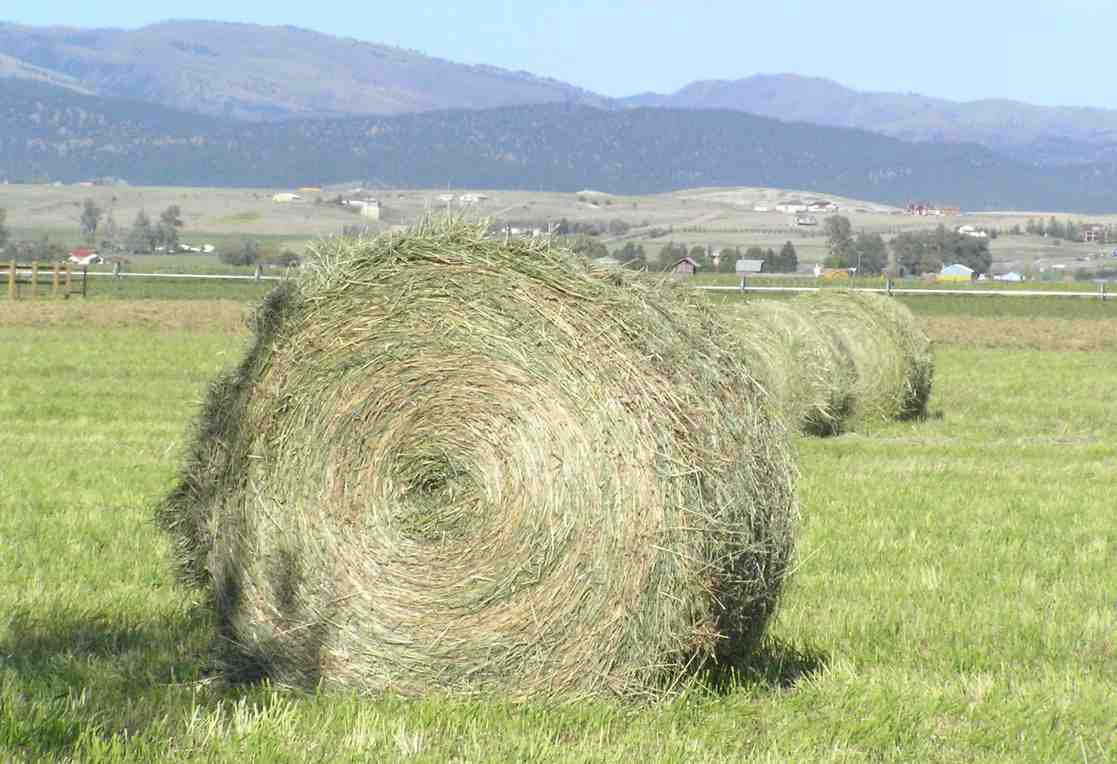
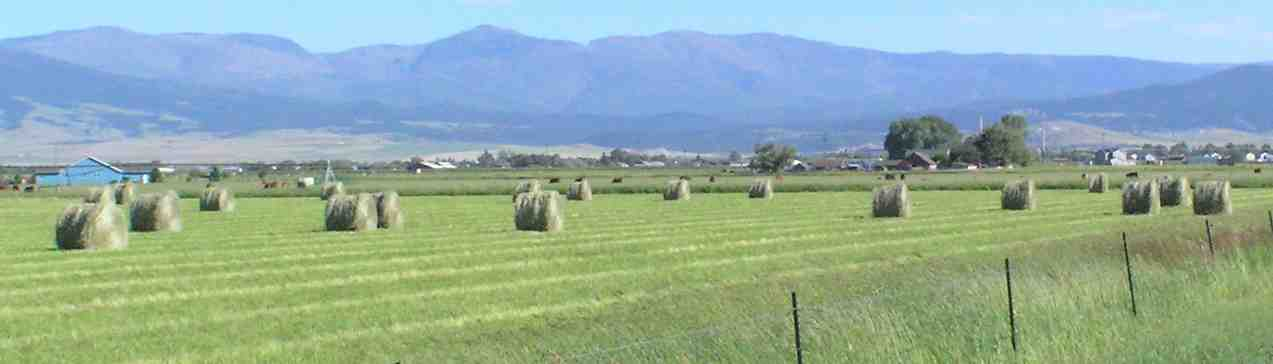
Fresh grass hay, newly baled.

Hay is grass, legumes, or other herbaceous plants that have been cut and dried to be stored for use as animal fodder, either for large grazing animals raised as livestock, such as cattle, horses, goats, and sheep, or for smaller domesticated animals such as rabbits and guinea pigs. Pigs can eat hay, but they do not digest it as efficiently as herbivores do.

Hay can be used as animal fodder when or where there is not enough pasture or rangeland on which to graze an animal, when grazing is not feasible due to weather (such as during the winter), or when lush pasture by itself would be too rich for the health of the animal. It is also fed when an animal cannot access any pastures—for example, when the animal is being kept in a stable or barn.

Hay production and harvest, commonly known as "making hay", "haymaking", "haying" or "doing hay", involves a multiple-step process: cutting, drying or "curing", raking, processing, and storing. Hayfields do not have to be reseeded each year in the way that grain crops are, but regular fertilizing is usually desirable, and overseeding a field every few years helps increase yield.

== Composition ==
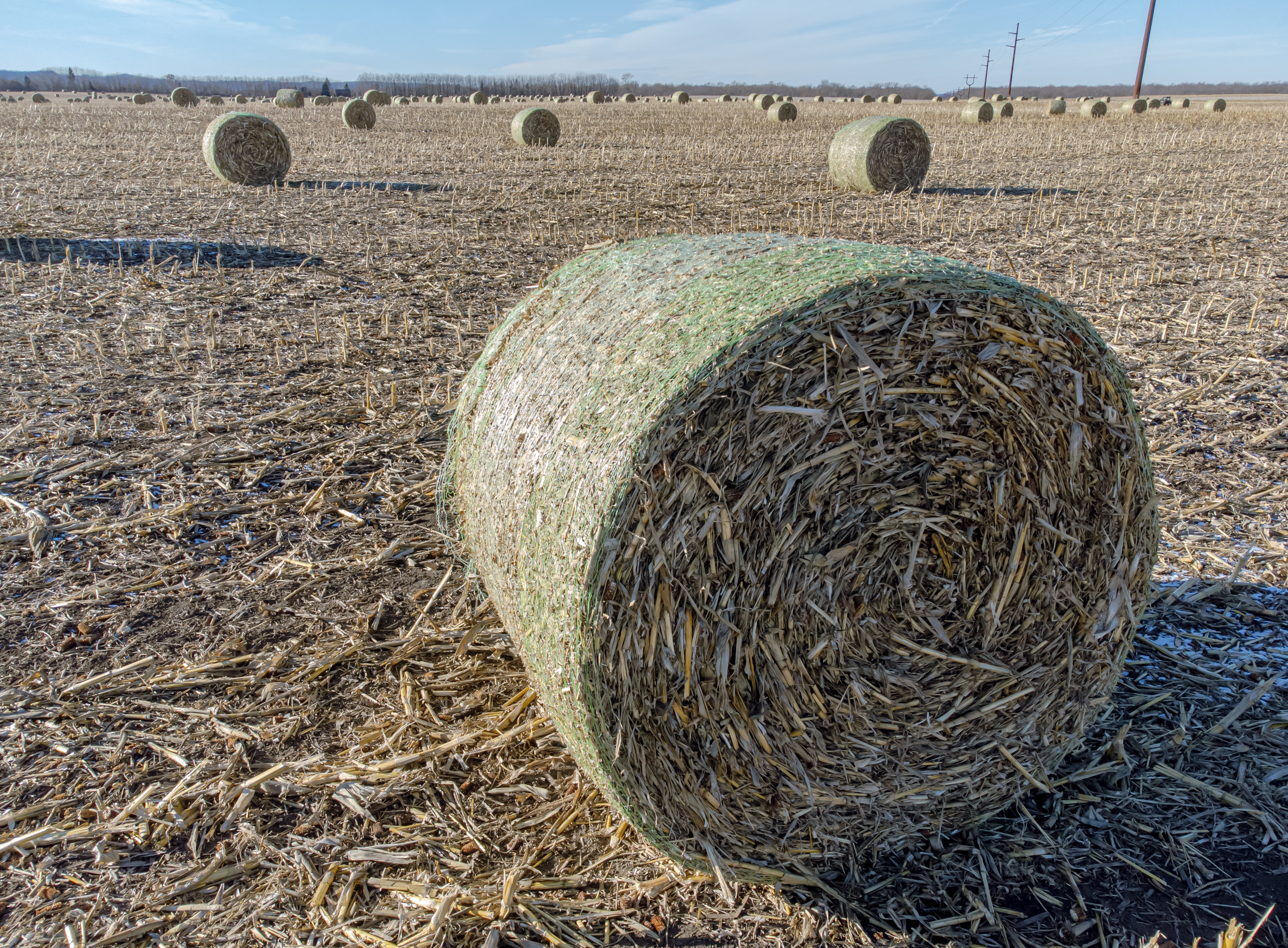
Baled cornstalks

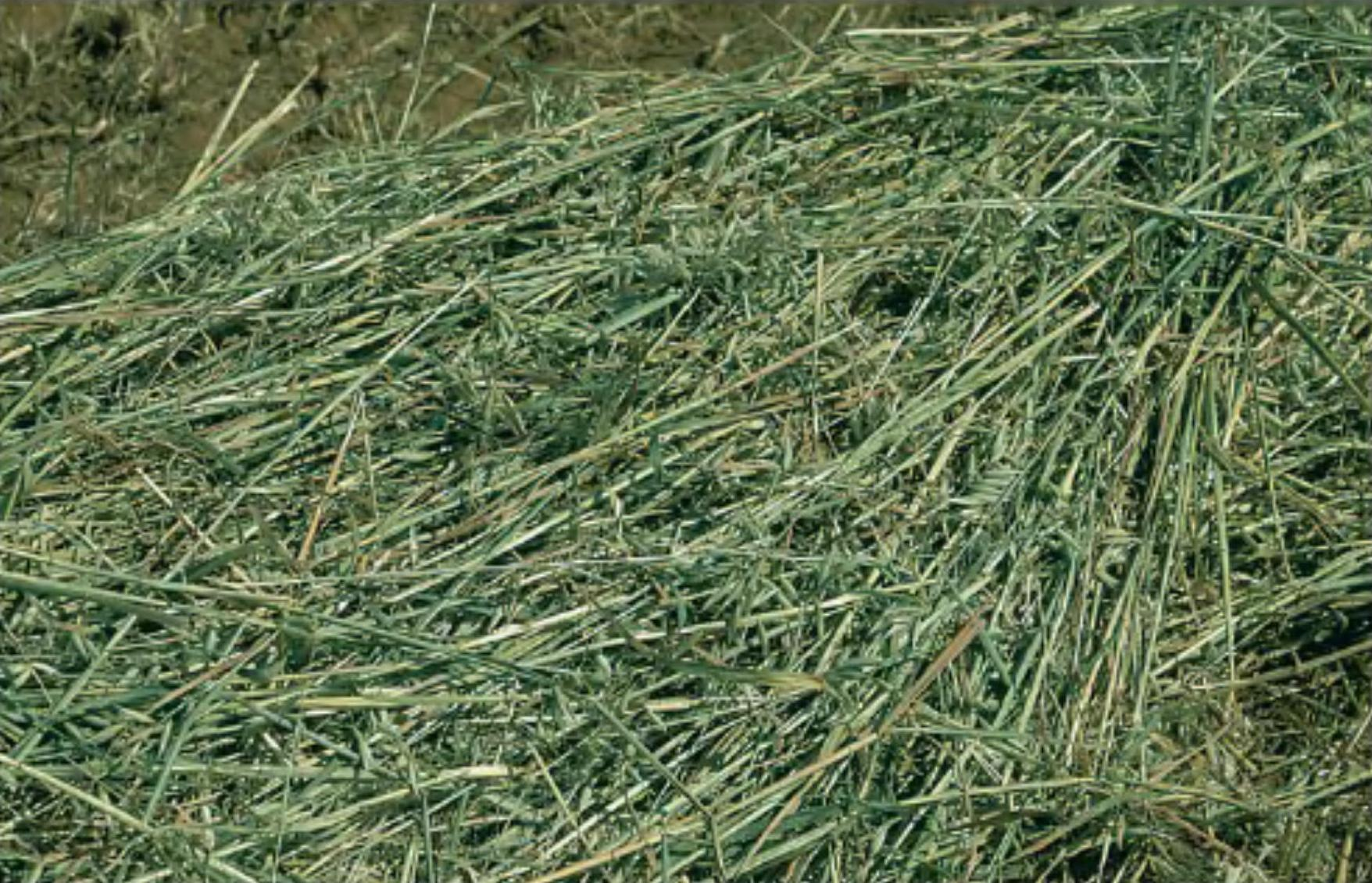
Good-quality hay is green and not too coarse and includes plant heads, leaves, and stems.

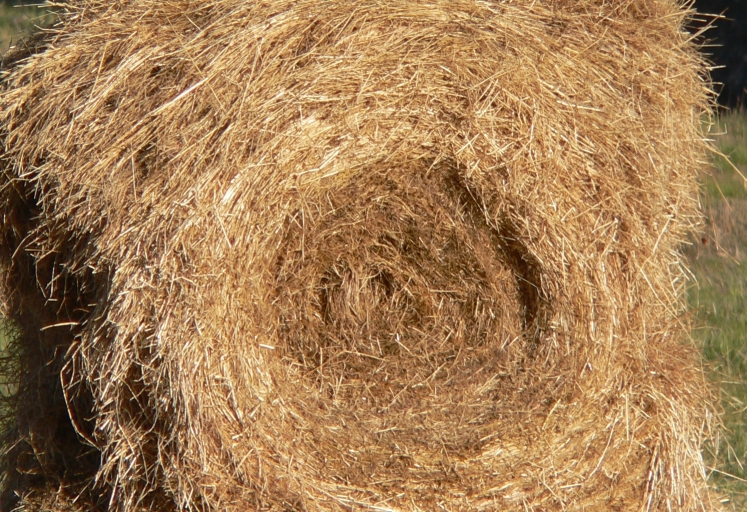
Poor-quality hay is dry, bleached out and coarse-stemmed. Sometimes, hay stored outdoors will look like this on the outside but still be green inside the bale. A dried, bleached or coarse bale is still edible and provides some nutritional value as long as it is dry and not moldy, dusty, or rotting.

Commonly used plants for hay include mixtures of grasses such as ryegrass (Lolium species), timothy, brome, fescue, Bermuda grass, orchard grass, and other species, depending on region. Hay may also include legumes, such as alfalfa (lucerne) and clovers (red, white and subterranean). Legumes in hay are ideally cut pre-bloom. Other pasture forbs are also sometimes a part of the mix, though these plants are not necessarily desired as certain forbs are toxic to some animals.

In the UK some hay is harvested from traditionally managed hay meadows which have a highly diverse flora and which support a rich eco-system. The hay produced by these meadows is species rich and was traditionally used to feed horses.

Oat, barley, and wheat plant materials are occasionally cut green and made into hay for animal fodder, and more usually used in the form of straw, a harvest byproduct of stems and dead leaves that are baled after the grain has been harvested and threshed. Straw is used mainly for animal bedding. Although straw is also used as fodder, particularly as a source of dietary fiber, it has lower nutritional value than hay.

In agroforestry systems are developed to produce tree hay.

It is the leaf and seed material in the hay that determines its quality, because they contain more of the nutrition value for the animal than the stems do. Farmers try to harvest hay at the point when the seed heads are not quite ripe and the leaf is at its maximum when the grass is mowed in the field. The cut material is allowed to dry so that the bulk of the moisture is removed but the leafy material is still robust enough to be picked up from the ground by machinery and processed into storage in bales, stacks or pits. Methods of haymaking thus aim to minimize the shattering and falling away of the leaves during handling.

Hay production is highly sensitive to weather conditions, particularly during the harvest period. In drought conditions, both seed and leaf production are stunted, resulting in hay with a high ratio of dry, coarse stems that possess very low nutritional value. Conversely, excessively wet weather can cause cut hay to spoil in the field before it can be baled. Consequently, the primary challenge and risk for farmers in hay production is managing the weather, especially during the critical few weeks when the plants are at optimal maturity for harvesting. A lucky break in the weather often moves the haymaking tasks (such as mowing, tedding, and baling) to the top priority on the farm's to-do list. This is reflected in the idiom to make hay while the sun shines. Hay that was too wet at cutting may develop rot and mold after being baled, creating the potential for toxins to form in the feed, which could make the animals sick.

After harvest, hay also has to be stored in a manner to prevent it from getting wet. Mold and spoilage reduce nutritional value and may cause illness in animals. A symbiotic fungus in fescue may cause illness in horses and cattle.

The successful harvest of maximum yields of high-quality hay is entirely dependent on the coincident occurrence of optimum crop, field, and weather conditions. When this occurs, there may be a period of intense activity on the hay farm while harvest proceeds until weather conditions become unfavourable.

== Use ==
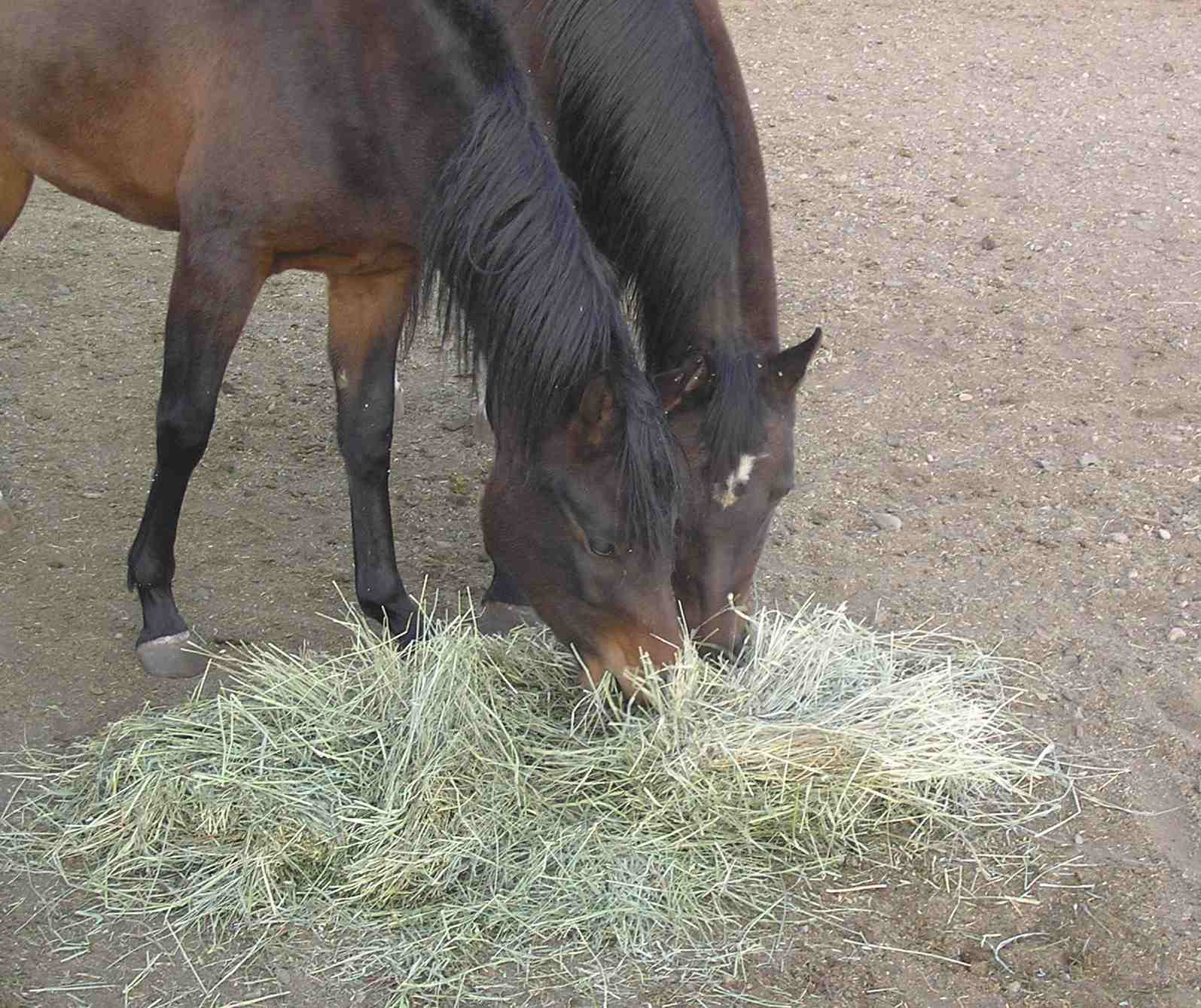
Horses eating hay

Hay or grass is the foundation of the diet for all grazing animals, and can provide as much as 100% of the fodder required for an animal. Hay is usually fed to an animal during times when winter, drought, or other conditions make pasture unavailable. Animals that can eat hay vary in the types of grasses suitable for consumption, the ways they consume hay, and how they digest it. Therefore, different types of animals require hay that consists of similar plants to what they would eat while grazing, and, likewise, plants that are toxic to an animal in pasture are generally also toxic if they are dried into hay.

Most animals are fed hay in two daily feedings, morning and evening, more for the convenience of humans, as most grazing animals on pasture naturally consume fodder in multiple feedings throughout the day. Some animals, especially those being raised for meat, may be given enough hay that they simply are able to eat all day. Other animals, especially those that are ridden or driven as working animals may be given a more limited amount of hay to prevent them from getting too fat. The proper amount of hay and the type of hay required varies somewhat between different species. Some animals are also fed concentrated feeds such as grain or vitamin supplements in addition to hay. In most cases, hay or pasture forage must make up 50% or more of the diet by weight.

One of the most significant differences in hay digestion is between ruminant animals, such as cattle and sheep, and nonruminant, hindgut fermentors, such as horses. Both types of animals can digest cellulose in grass and hay, but do so by different mechanisms. Because of the four-chambered stomach of cattle, they are often able to break down older forage and have more tolerance of mold and changes in diet. The single-chambered stomach and cecum or "hindgut" of the horse uses bacterial processes to break down cellulose that are more sensitive to changes in feeds and the presence of mold or other toxins, requiring horses to be fed hay of a more consistent type and quality.

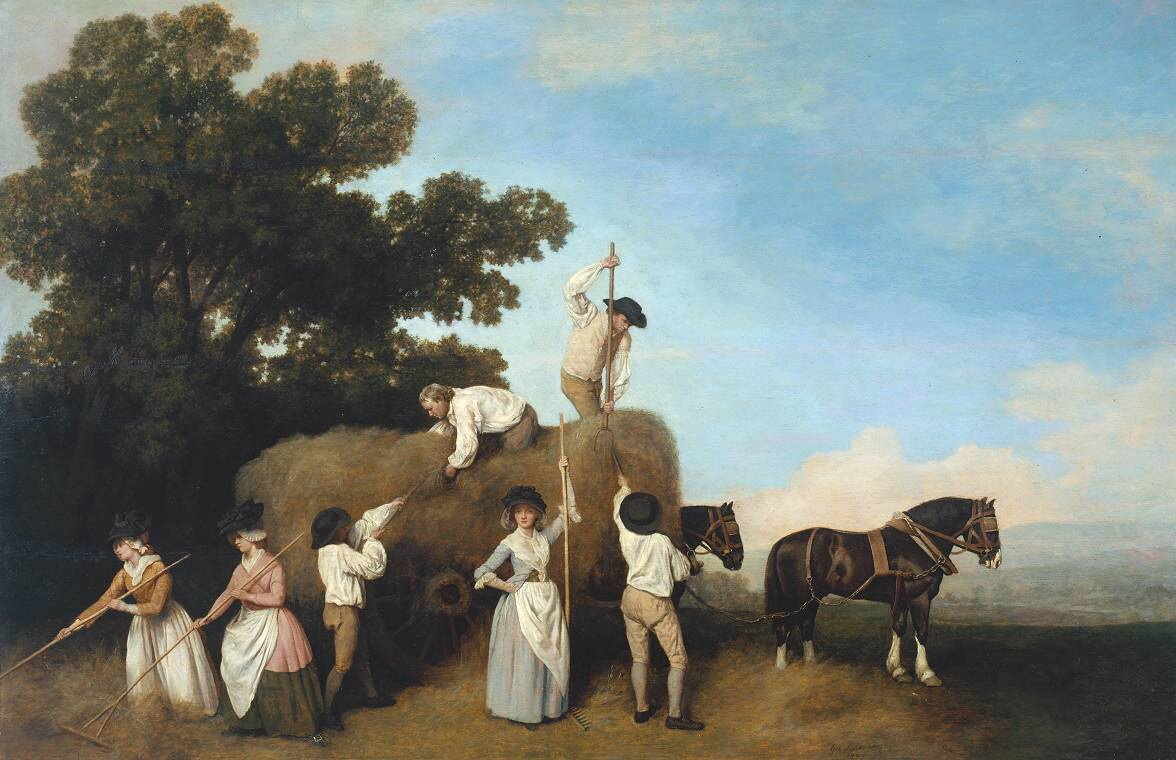
Haymakers by George Stubbs, 1785

Different animals also use hay in different ways: cattle evolved to eat forages in relatively large quantities at a single feeding, and then, due to the process of rumination, take a considerable amount of time for their stomachs to digest food, often accomplished while the animal is lying down, at rest. Thus quantity of hay is important for cattle, who can effectively digest hay of low quality if fed in sufficient amounts. Sheep will eat between two and four percent of their body weight per day in dry feed, such as hay, and are very efficient at obtaining the most nutrition possible from three to five pounds per day of hay or other forage. They require three to four hours per day to eat enough hay to meet their nutritional requirements.

Unlike ruminants, horses digest their food in small portions throughout the day and can utilize only about 2.5% of their body weight in feed within a 24-hour period. Horses evolved to graze continuously while on the move, covering up to 50 miles (80 km) per day in the wild. Their stomachs digest food quickly, allowing them to extract a higher nutritional value from smaller quantities of feed When horses are fed low-quality hay, they may develop an unhealthy, obese, "hay belly" due to over-consumption of "empty" calories. If their type of feed is changed dramatically, or if they are fed moldy hay or hay containing toxic plants, they can become ill; colic is the leading cause of death in horses. Contaminated hay can also lead to respiratory problems in horses. Hay can be soaked in water, sprinkled with water or subjected to steaming to reduce dust.

== Harvest and transport ==
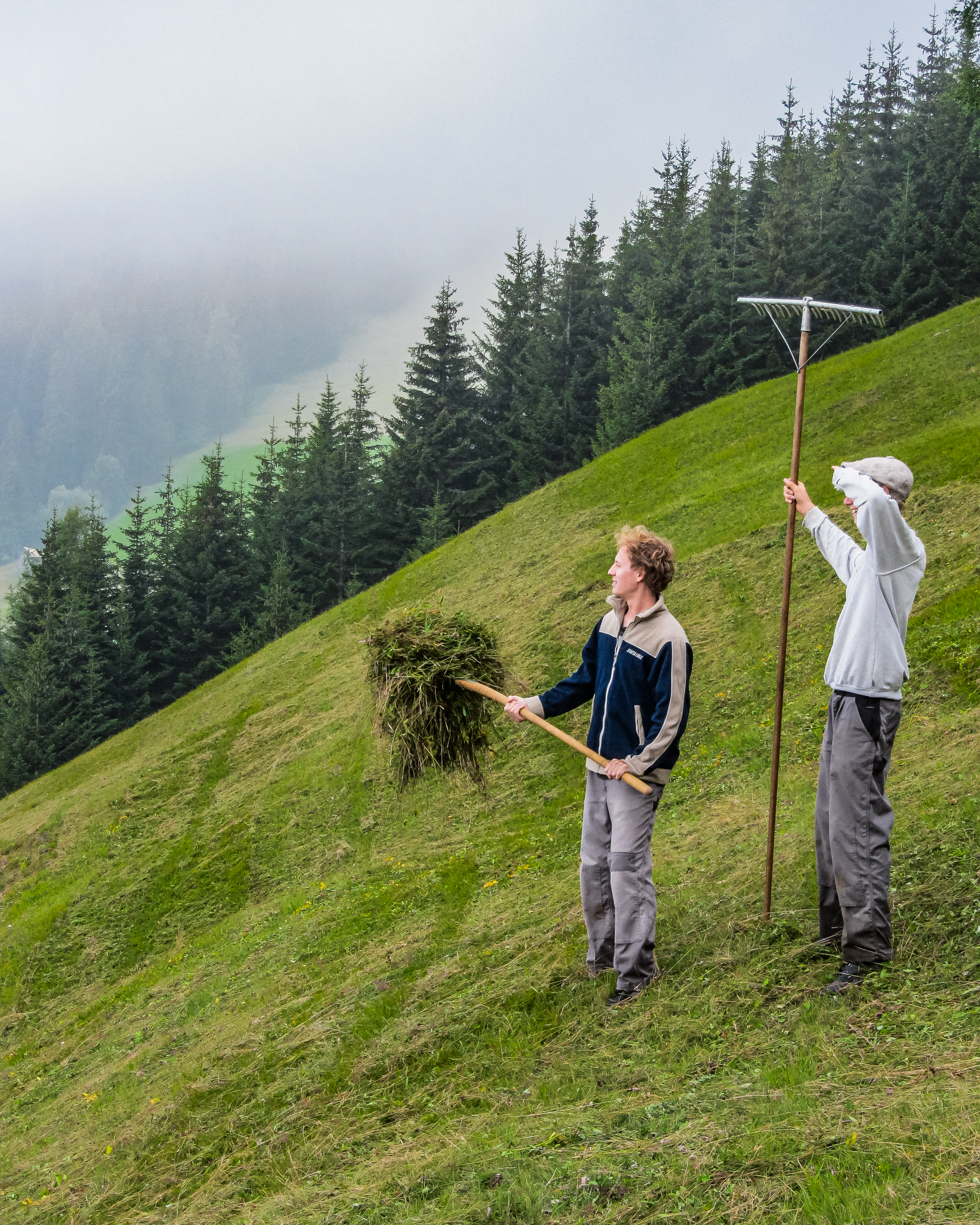
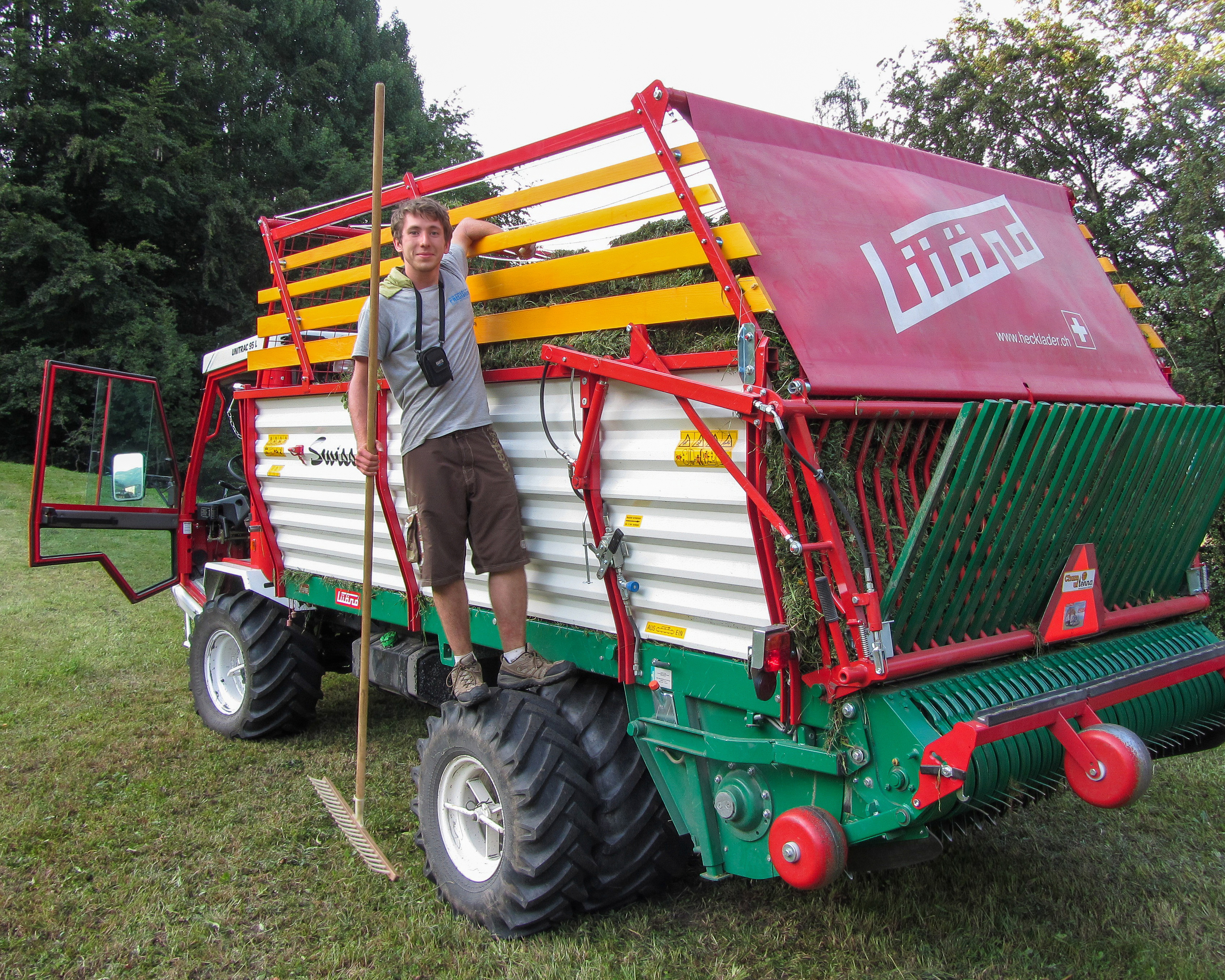
Farmers harvesting hay from mountains in Switzerland

Methods and the terminology to describe the steps of making hay have varied greatly throughout history, and many regional variations still exist today. Whether done by hand or by modern mechanized equipment, tall grass and legumes at the proper stage of maturity must be cut, then allowed to dry (preferably by the sun), then raked into long, narrow piles known as windrows. Next, the cured hay is gathered up in some form (usually by some type of baling process) and placed for storage into a haystack or into a barn or shed to protect it from moisture and rot.

During the growing season, which is spring and early summer in temperate climates, grass grows at a fast pace. Hay reaches its peak nutritional value when all leaves are fully developed and seed or flower heads are just shy of full maturity. At this stage of maximum growth in the pasture or field, if timed correctly, the hay is cut. Grass hay cut too early retains high moisture content, making it harder to cure and resulting in a lower yield per acre compared to more mature grass. However, hay cut too late becomes coarser, has a lower resale value, and loses some of its nutrients. Typically, there is a two-week "window" during which grass is at its ideal stage for harvesting hay. The time for cutting alfalfa hay is ideally done when plants reach maximum height and are producing flower buds or just beginning to bloom, cutting during or after full bloom results in lower nutritional value of the hay.

Hay can be raked into rows as it is cut, then turned periodically to dry, particularly if a modern swather is used. Or, especially with older equipment or methods, the hay is cut and allowed to lie spread out in the field until it is dry, then raked into rows for processing into bales afterwards. During the drying period, which can take several days, the process is usually sped up by turning the cut hay over with a hay rake or spreading it out with a tedder. If it rains while the hay is drying, turning the windrow can also allow it to dry faster. Turning the hay too often or too roughly can also cause drying leaf matter to fall off, reducing the nutrients available to animals. Drying can also be sped up by mechanized processes, such as the use of a hay conditioner, or by the use of chemicals sprayed onto the hay to speed evaporation of moisture, though these are more expensive techniques, not in general use except in areas where there is a combination of modern technology, high prices for hay, and too much rain for hay to dry properly.

Once hay is cut, dried and raked into windrows, it is usually gathered into bales or bundles, and then hauled to a central location for storage. In some places, depending on geography, region, climate, and culture, hay is gathered loose and stacked without being baled first.

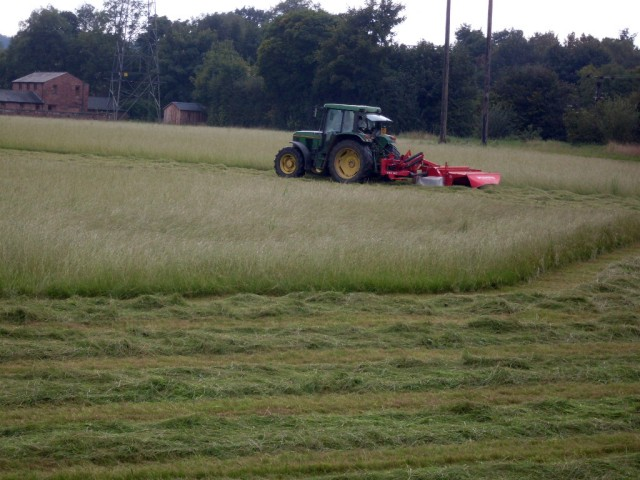
A tractor mowing a hay field, with the cut hay lying in the foreground

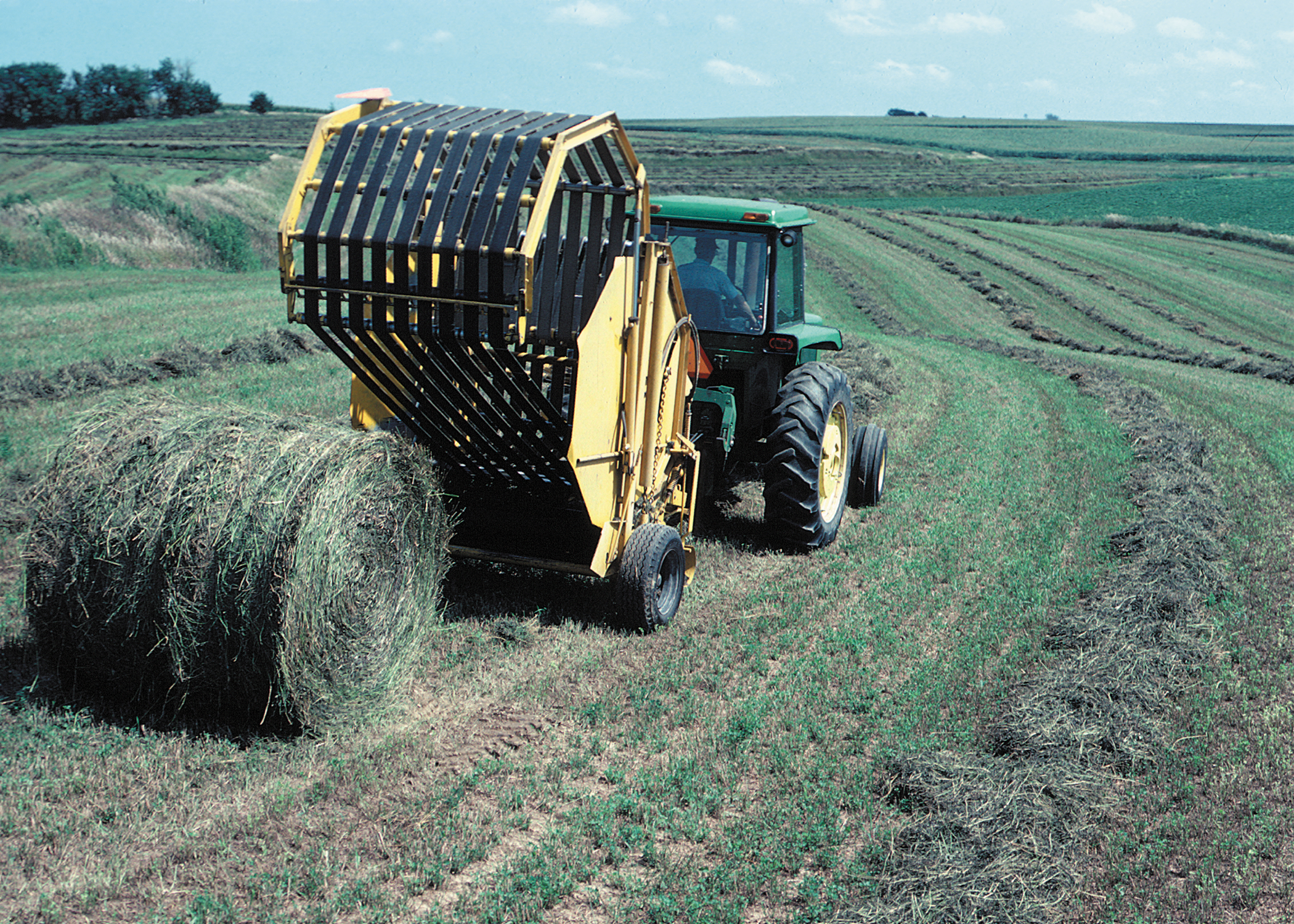
A round baler dumping a freshly rolled hay bale

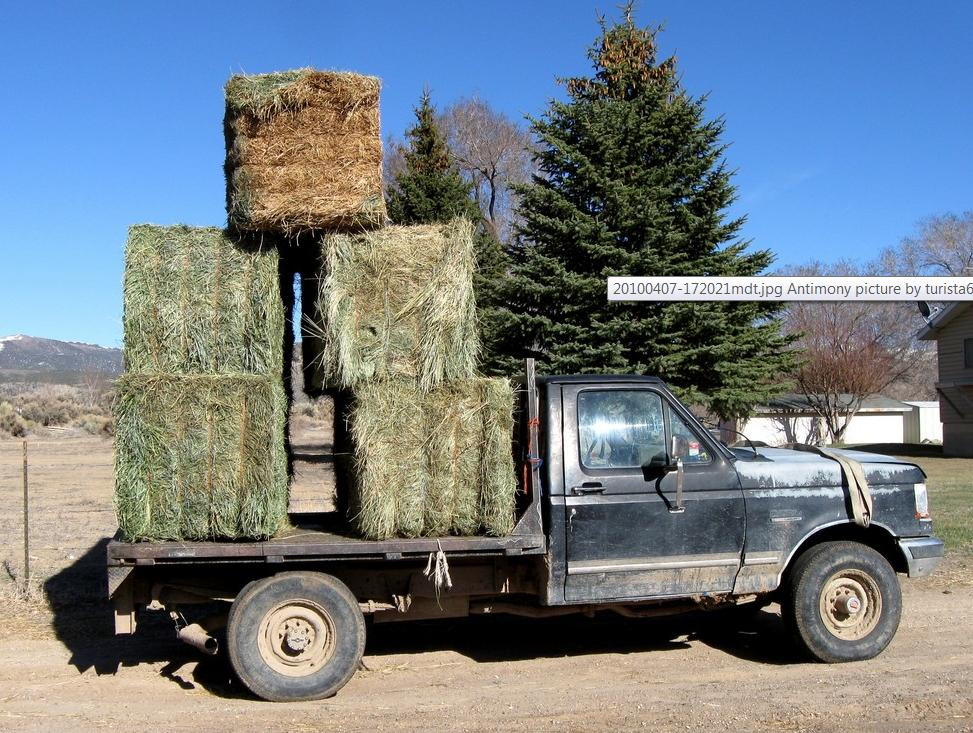
Typical modern small-scale transport: a truck loaded with large square bales

== History ==
=== Early methods ===
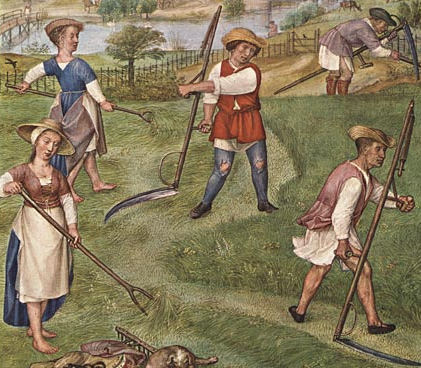
Haymakers, from the Grimani Breviary, c. 1510

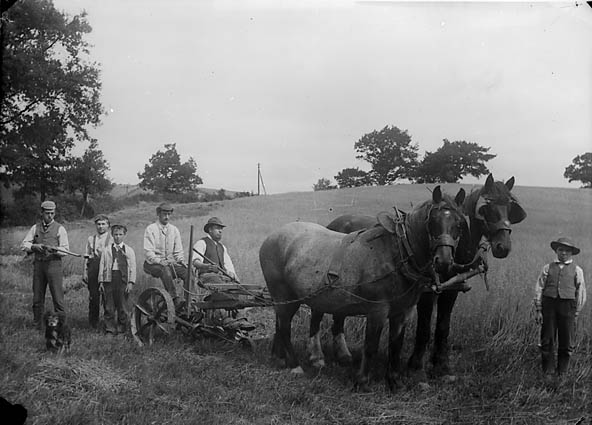
Haymaking in Wales c. 1885

Columella in his De re rustica describes the usual haying process of the early Roman Empire. Much hay was originally cut by scythe by teams of workers, dried in the field and gathered loose on wagons. Later, haying was accomplished with horse-drawn implements such as mowers.

After hay was cut and dried, it was raked or rowed up by raking it into a linear heap by hand or with a horse-drawn implement. Turning hay, when needed, originally was done by hand with a fork or rake. Once the dried hay was rowed up, pitchforks were used to pile it loose, originally onto a horse-drawn cart or wagon, later onto a truck or tractor-drawn trailer, for which a sweep could be used instead of pitch forks.

Loose hay was transported to a designated storage area, typically a slightly elevated location to ensure proper drainage, where it was constructed into a haystack. Building the stack was a skilled task, as it needed to be made waterproof during construction. The haystack would compress under its own weight, allowing the hay to cure through the release of heat generated by the residual moisture and compression forces. The haystack was usually enclosed in a fenced-off area, known as a rick yard, to separate it from the rest of the paddock, and was often thatched or covered with sheets to protect it from moisture. When needed, slices of hay would be cut using a hay knife and fed to animals each day.

On some farms, the loose hay was stored in a barrack, shed, or barn, normally in such a way that it would compress down and cure. Hay could be stored in a specially designed barn with little internal structure to allow more room for the hay loft. Alternatively, an upper storey of a cow-shed or stable was used, with hatches in the floor to allow hay to be thrown down into hay-racks below. Depending on the region, the term "hay rick" could refer to the machine for cutting hay, the haystack or the wagon used to collect the hay.

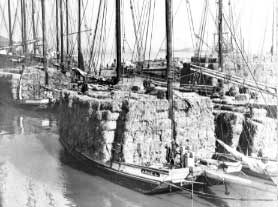
Late 19th-century hay boat with small square bales

With the invention of agricultural machinery such as the tractor and the baler, most hay production became mechanized by the 1930s. Hay baling began with the invention of the first hay press in about 1850. Timothy grass and clover were the most common plants used for hay in the early 20th century in the United States, though both plants are native to Europe. Hay was baled for easier handling and to reduce space required for storage and shipment. The first bales weighed about 300 pounds. The original machines were of a vertical design similar to the one photographed by the Greene Co. Historical Society. They used a horse-driven screw-press mechanism or a dropped weight to compress the hay. The first patent went to HL Emery for a horse-powered, screw-operated hay press in 1853. Other models were reported as early as 1843 built by PK Dederick's Sons of Albany, New York, or Samuel Hewitt of Switzerland County, Indiana. Later, horizontal machines were devised. One was the “Perpetual Press” made by PK Dederick of Albany in 1872. They could be powered by steam engines by about 1882. The continuous hay baler arrived in 1914.

=== Modern mechanized techniques ===
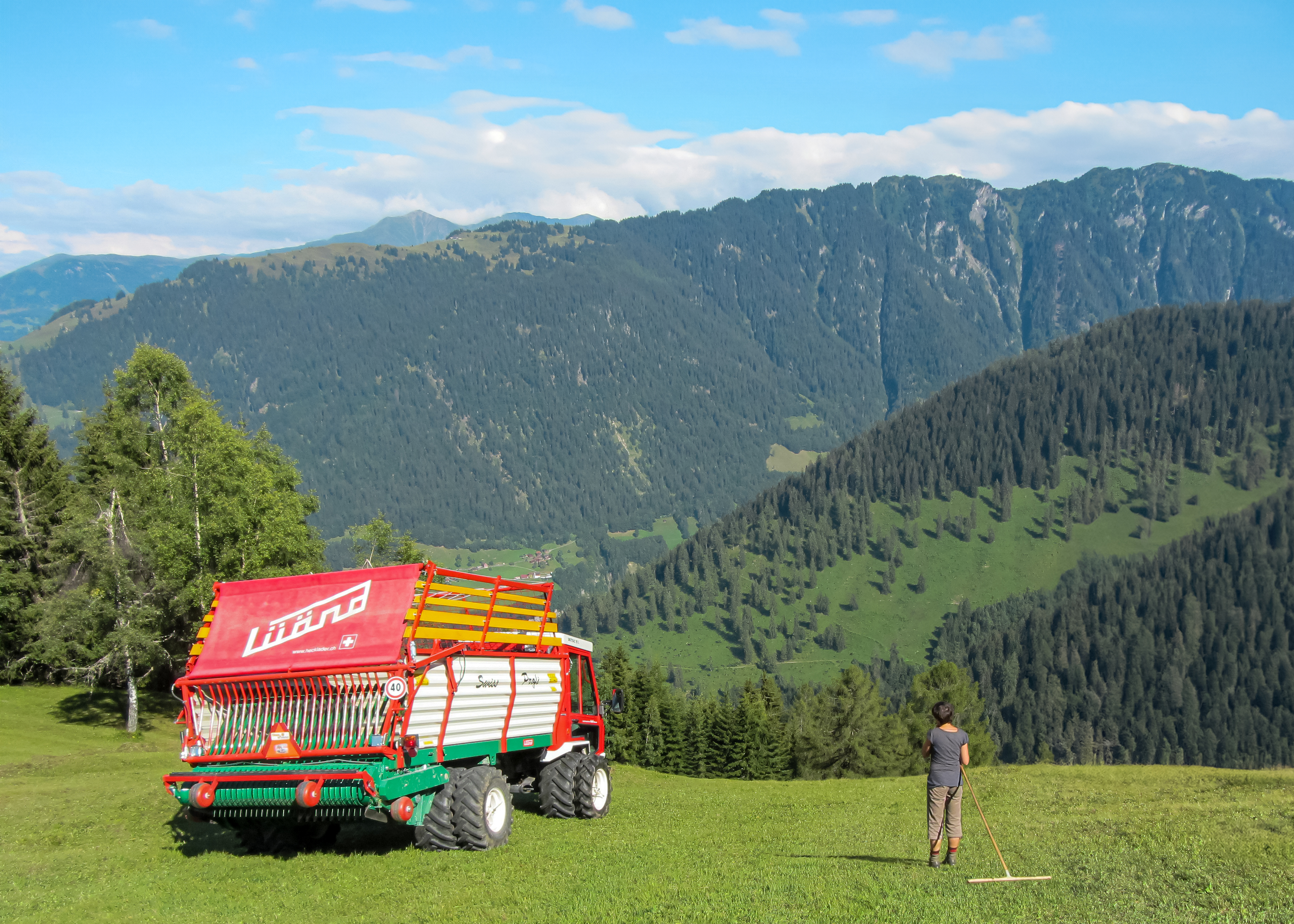
Harvesting hay on the Swiss Alps

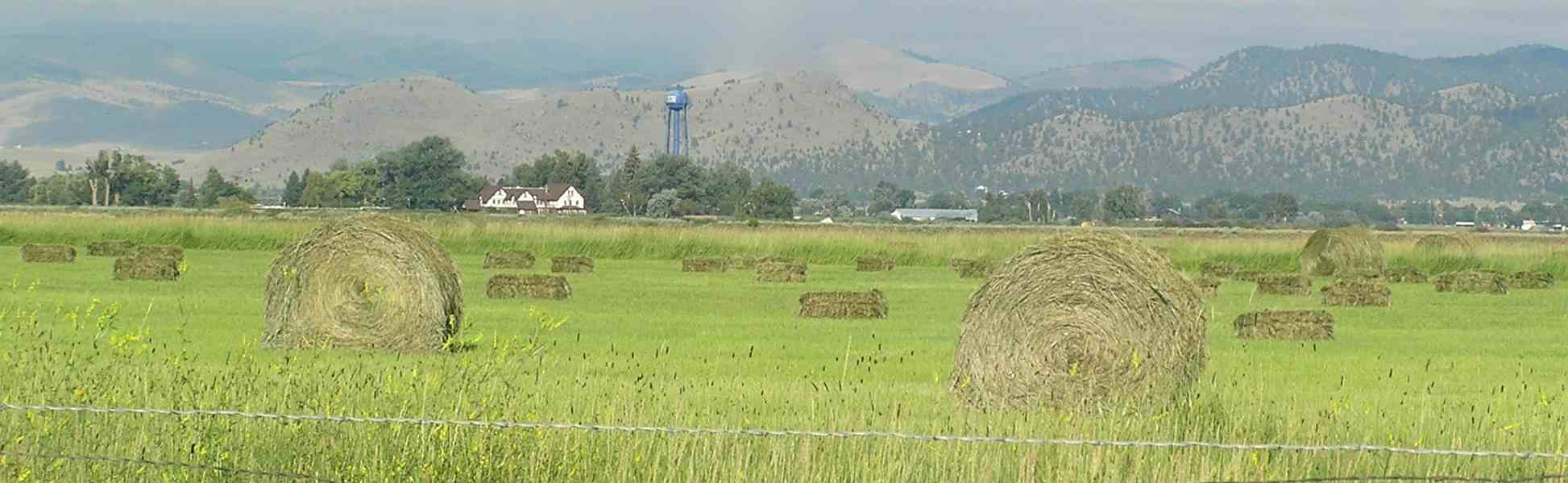
Different balers can produce hay bales in different sizes and shapes. Here two different balers were used to create both large round bales and small square bales.

Baling hay

Modern mechanized hay production today is usually performed by a number of machines. While small operations use a tractor to pull various implements for mowing and raking, larger operations use specialized machines such as a mower or a swather, which are designed to cut the hay and arrange it into a windrow in one step. Balers are usually pulled by a tractor, with larger balers requiring more powerful tractors.

Mobile balers, machines that gather and bale hay in one process were first developed around 1940. The initial balers produced rectangular bales that were small enough for an individual to lift, typically weighing between 70 and 100 pounds (32 to 45 kg) each. The size and shape of these bales allowed for manual handling, including lifting, stacking on transport vehicles, and constructing a haystack by hand. To reduce labor and enhance safety, loaders and stackers were subsequently developed to mechanize the transportation of small bales from the field to the haystack or hay barn. Later in the 20th century, balers were developed capable of producing large bales that weigh up to 3,000 pounds (1,400 kg).

Conditioning of hay crop during cutting or soon thereafter is popular. The basic idea is that it decreases drying time, particularly in humid climates or if rain threatens to interfere with haying. Usually, rollers or flails inside a mower conditioner crimp, crack or strip the alfalfa or grass stems to increase evaporation rate. Sometimes, a desiccant solution is sprayed over the top of the hay (generally alfalfa) that helps to dry the hay.

== Fertilization and weed control ==
Modern hay production often relies on artificial fertilizer and herbicides. Traditionally, manure has been used on hayfields, but modern chemical fertilizers are used today as well. Hay that is to be certified as weed-free for use in wilderness areas must often be sprayed with chemical herbicides to keep unwanted weeds from the field, and sometimes even non-certified hayfields are sprayed to limit the production of noxious weeds. Organic forms of fertilization and weed control are required for hay grown for consumption by animals whose meat will ultimately be certified organic. To that end, compost and field rotation can enhance soil fertility, and regular mowing of fields in the growth phase of the hay will often reduce the prevalence of undesired weeds. In recent times, some producers have experimented with human sewage sludge to grow hay. This is not a certified organic method and no warning labels are mandated by EPA. One concern with hay grown on human sewage sludge is that the hay can take up heavy metals, which are then consumed by animals. Molybdenum poisoning is a particular concern in ruminants such as cows and goats, and there have been animal deaths. Another concern is with a herbicide known as aminopyralid, which can pass through the digestive tract in animals, making their resulting manure toxic to many plants and thus unsuitable as fertilizer for food crops. Aminopyralid and related herbicides can persist in the environment for several years.

== Baling ==
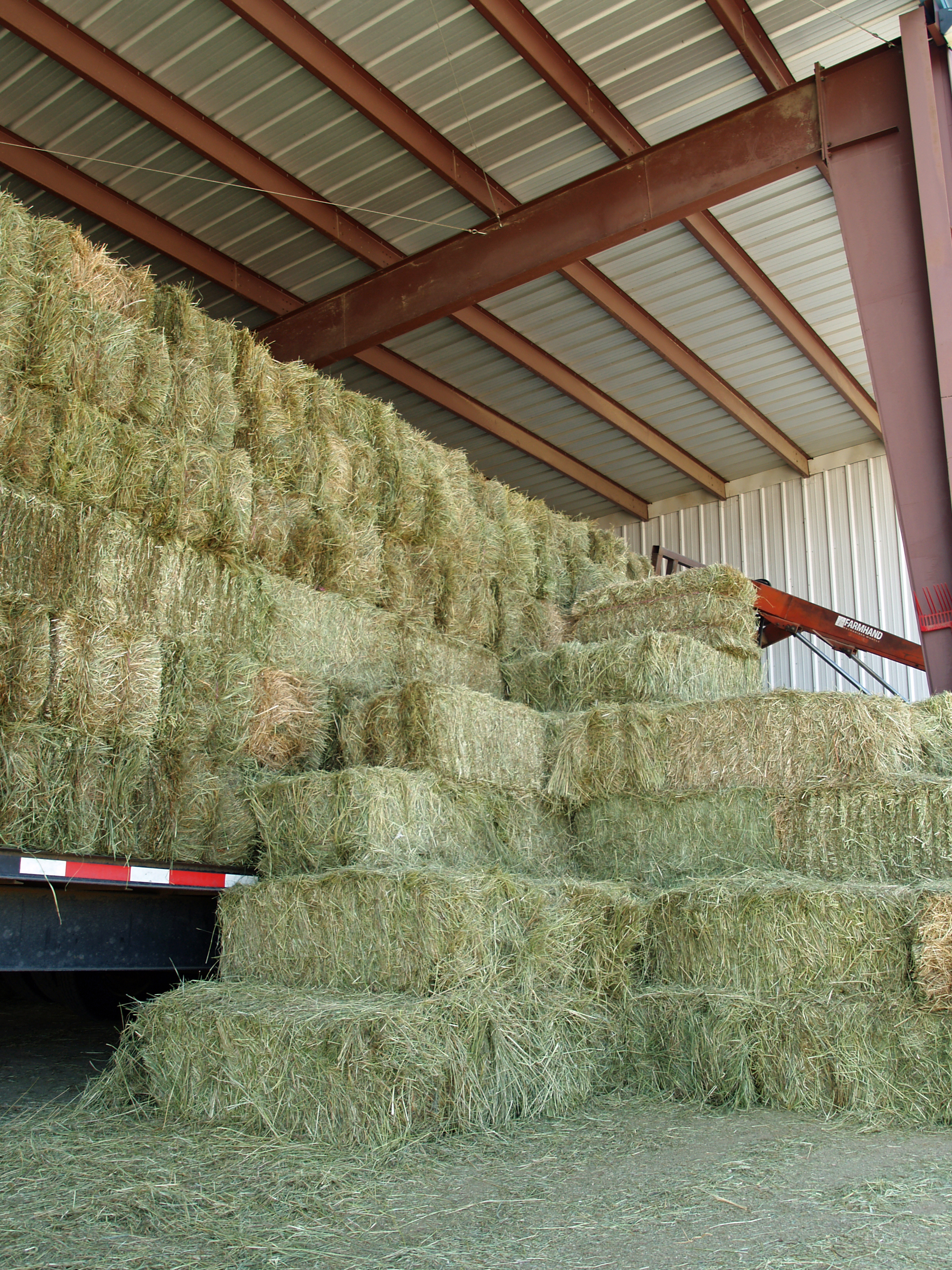
When possible, hay, especially small square bales like these, should be stored under cover and protected from precipitation.

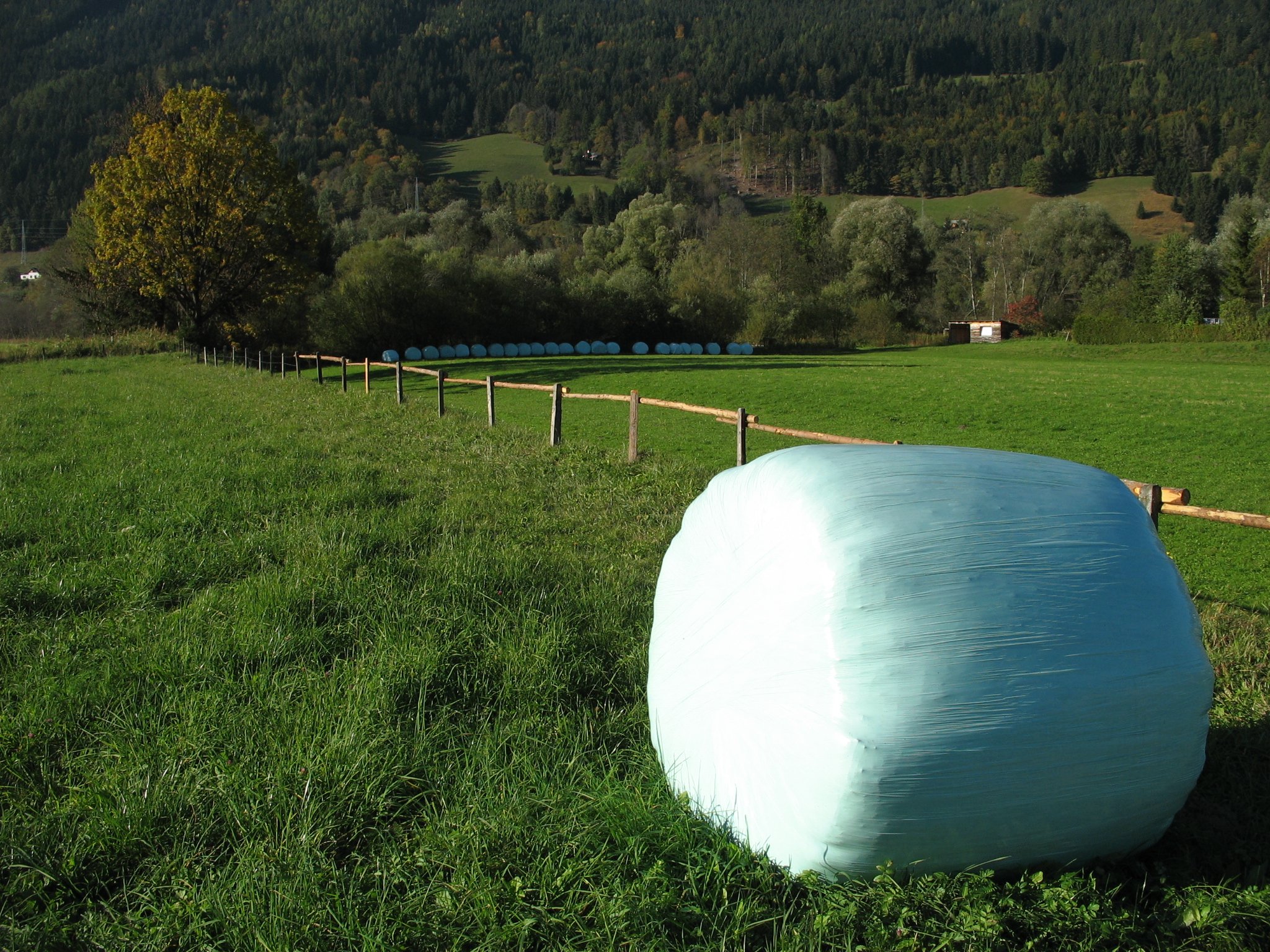
A completely wrapped silage bale in Austria

Small square bales are made in two main variations. The smaller "two-tie" (two twines to hold the bale together) or larger "three-tie" (three twines to hold the bale together). They vary in size within both groups but are generally popular in different markets. The smaller two-tie bales are favored in the hobby animal market and are preferred for their convenient size. The larger, three-tie bales are favored by producers wanting to export bales because of the increase of efficiency in transportation and also by customers for a better price per ton. The two-tie small bales are the original form factor of hay bales. Balers for both types of small bales are still manufactured, as well as stackers, bundlers and bale accumulators for handling them. Some farms still use equipment manufactured over 50 years ago to produce small bales. The small bale remains part of overall ranch lore and tradition with "hay bucking" competitions still held for fun at many rodeos and county fairs. Small square bales are often stacked mechanically or by hand in a crisscrossed fashion sometimes called a "haystack", "rick" or "hayrick". Rain tends to wash nutrition out of hay and can cause spoilage or mold; hay in small square bales is particularly susceptible. Small bales are, therefore, often stored in a haymow or hayshed. Haystacks built outside are usually protected by tarpaulins. If this is not done, the top two layers of the stack are often lost to rot and mold, and if the stack is not arranged in a proper haystack, moisture can seep even deeper into the stack. The rounded shape and tighter compaction of round bales make them less susceptible to spoilage, as the water is less likely to penetrate the bale. Adding net wrap, which is not used on square bales, offers even more weather resistance. People who keep small numbers of animals may prefer small bales that one person can handle without machinery. There is also a risk that hay bales may be moldy or contain decaying carcasses of tiny creatures accidentally killed by baling equipment and swept up into the bale, producing toxins such as botulinum toxin. Both can be deadly to non-ruminant herbivores such as horses, and when this occurs, the entire contaminated bale generally is thrown out, another reason some people continue to support the market for small bales.

Farmers who need to make large amounts of hay will likely choose balers that produce much larger bales, maximizing the amount of hay protected from the elements. Large bales come in two types: round and square. Large square bales, which can weigh up to 1,000 kilograms (2,200 lb), can be stacked and easily transported on trucks. Large round bales, which typically weigh 300 to 400 kilograms (660–880 lb), are more moisture-resistant and pack the hay more densely (especially at the center). Round bales are quickly fed with the use of mechanized equipment. The volume-to-surface area ratio allows many dry-area farmers to leave large bales outside until consumed. Wet-area farmers and those in climates with heavy snowfall can stack round bales under a shed or tarp and use a light but durable plastic wrap that partially encloses outside bales. The wrap repels moisture but leaves the ends of the bale exposed so that the hay itself can "breathe" and does not begin to ferment. When it is possible to store round bales under a shed, they last longer, and less hay is lost to rot and moisture.

For animals that eat silage, a bale wrapper may be used to seal a round bale completely and trigger the fermentation process. It is a technique used as a money-saving process by producers who do not have access to a superior silo, and for producing silage that is transported to other locations. In very damp climates, it is a legitimate alternative to drying hay completely. When processed properly, the natural fermentation process prevents mold and rot. Round bale silage is also sometimes called "haylage", and is seen more commonly in Europe than in either the United States or Australia. Hay stored in this fashion must remain completely sealed in plastic, as any holes or tears will allow the entrance of oxygen and can stop the preservation properties of fermentation and lead to spoilage.

== Stacking ==
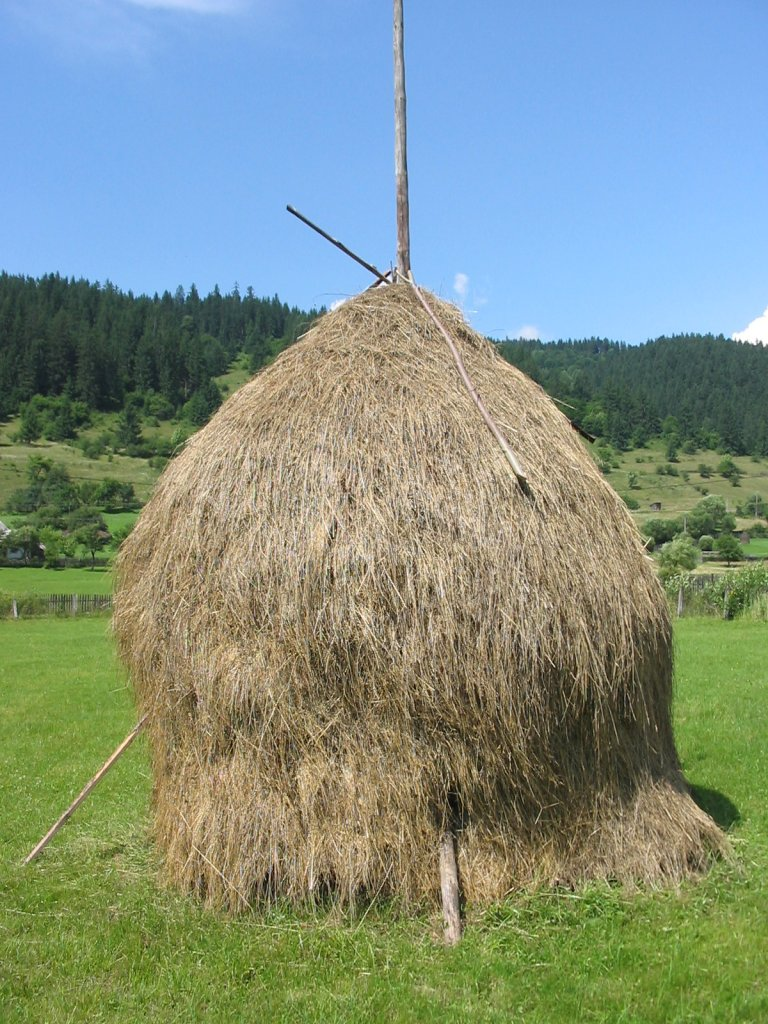
Loose stacked hay built around a central pole, supported by side poles, in Romania

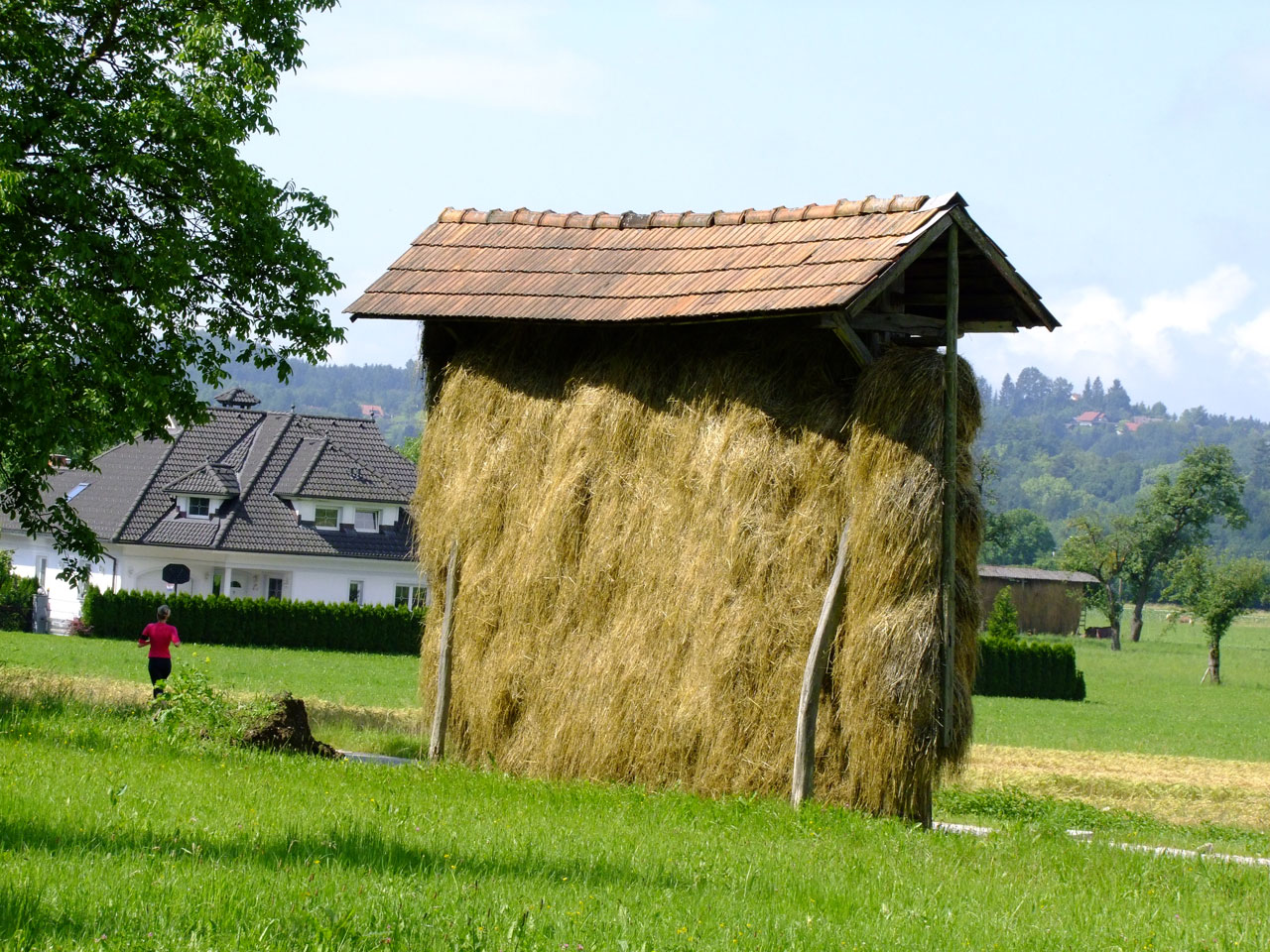
Kozolec, a traditional Slovenian hayrack

Hay requires protection from the weather, and is optimally stored inside buildings, but weather protection is also provided in other ways involving outdoor storage, either in haystacks or in large tight bales (round or rectangular); these methods all depend on the surface of an outdoor mass of hay (stack or bale) taking the hit of the weather and thereby preserving the main body of hay underneath.

Traditionally, outdoor hay storage was done with haystacks of loose hay, where most of the hay was sufficiently preserved to last through the winter, and the top surface of the stack (being weathered) was consigned to become compost the next summer. The term "loose" means not pressed or baled but does not necessarily mean a light, fluffy lay of randomly oriented stems. Especially in wet climates, such as those of Britain, the degree of shedding of rainwater by the stack's outer surface is an important factor, and the stacking of loose hay was developed into a skilled-labor task that in its more advanced forms even involved thatching the top. In many stacking methods (with or without thatched tops), stems were oriented in sheaves, which were laid in oriented sequence.

With the advent of large bales since the 1960s, today hay is often stored outdoors because the outer surface of the large bale performs the weather-shedding function. The large bales can also be stacked, which allows a given degree of exposed surface area to count for a larger volume of protected interior hay. Plastic tarpaulins are sometimes used to shed the rain, with the goal of reduced hay wastage, but the cost of the tarpaulins must be weighed against the cost of the hay spoilage percentage difference; it may not be worth the cost, or the plastic's environmental footprint.

After World War II, British farmers found that the demand outstripped supply for skilled farm laborers experienced in the thatching of haystacks. This no doubt contributed to the pressure for baling in large bales to increasingly replace stacking, which was happening anyway as haymaking technology (like other farm technology) continued toward extensive mechanization with one-person operation of many tasks. Today tons of hay can be cut, conditioned, dried, raked, and baled by one person, as long as the right equipment is at hand (although that equipment is expensive). These tons of hay can also be moved by one person, again with the right (expensive) equipment, as loaders with long spikes run by hydraulic circuits pick up each large bale and move it to its feeding location.

A fence may be built to enclose a haystack and prevent roaming animals from eating it, or animals may feed directly from a field-constructed stack as part of their winter feeding.

Haystacks are also sometimes called haycocks; among some users this term refers more specifically to small piles of cut-and-gathered hay awaiting stacking into larger stacks. The words (haystack, haycock) are usually styled as solid compounds, but not always. Haystacks are also sometimes called stooks, shocks, or ricks.

Loose stacks are built to prevent the accumulation of moisture and promote drying or curing. In some places, this is accomplished by constructing stacks with a conical or ridged top. The exterior may look gray on the surface after weathering, but the inner hay retains traces of its fresh-cut aroma and maintains a faded green tint. They can be covered with thatch, or kept within a protective structure. One such structure is a moveable roof supported by four posts, historically called a Dutch roof, hay barrack, or hay cap. Haystacks may also be built on top of a foundation laid on the ground to reduce spoilage, in some places made of wood or brush. In other areas, hay is stacked loose, built around a central pole, a tree, or within an area of three or four poles to add stability to the stack.

One loose hay stacking technique seen in the British Isles is to initially stack freshly cut hay into smaller mounds called foot cocks, hay coles, kyles, hayshocks or haycocks, to facilitate initial curing. These are sometimes built atop platforms or tripods formed of three poles, used to keep hay off the ground and let air into the center for better drying. The shape causes dew and rainwater to roll down the sides, allowing the hay within to cure. People who handle the hay may use hayforks or pitchforks to move or pitch the hay in building haycocks and haystacks. Construction of tall haystacks is sometimes aided with a ramp, ranging from simple poles to a device for building large loose stacks called a beaverslide.

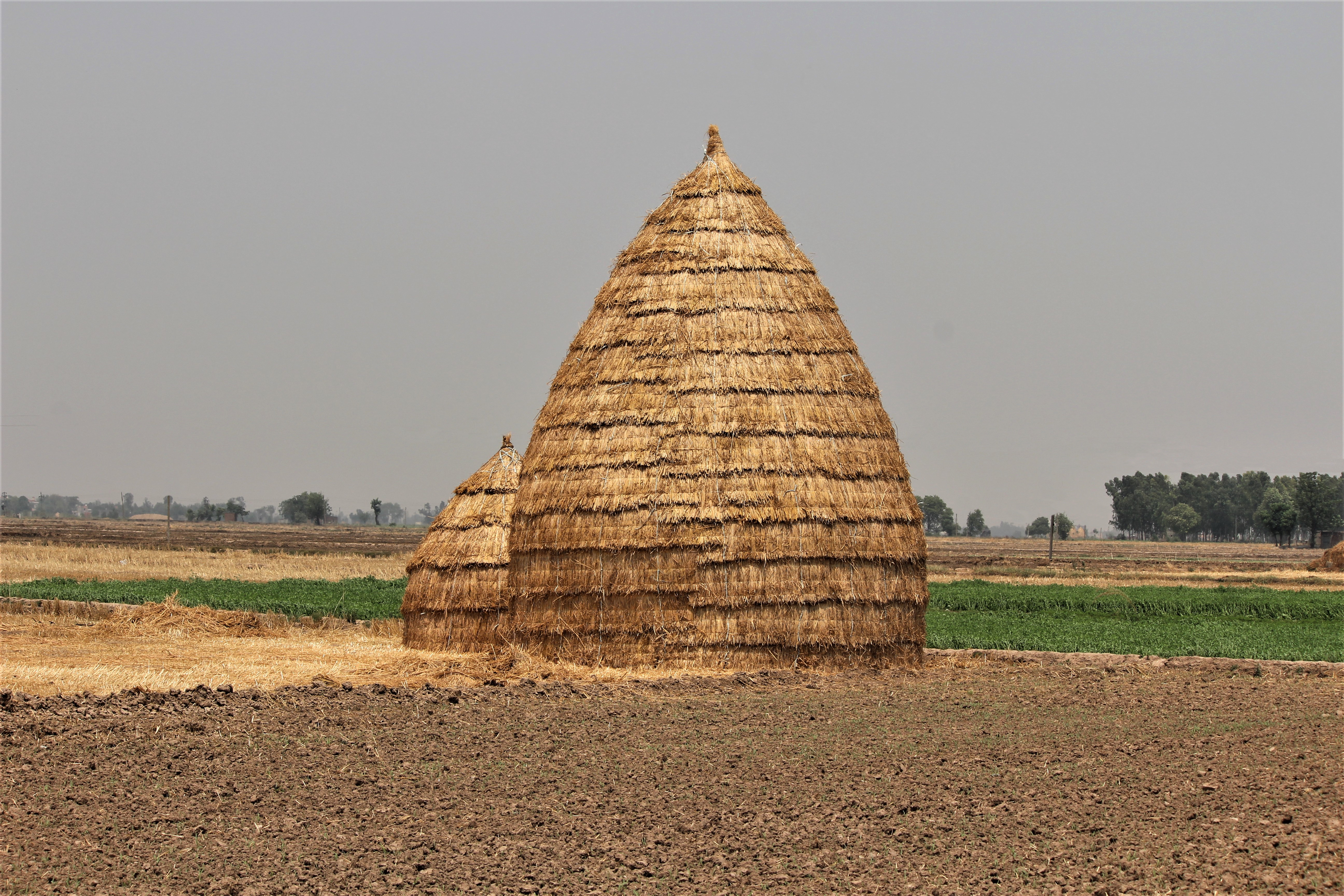
A traditional method of storing wheat hay in Punjab

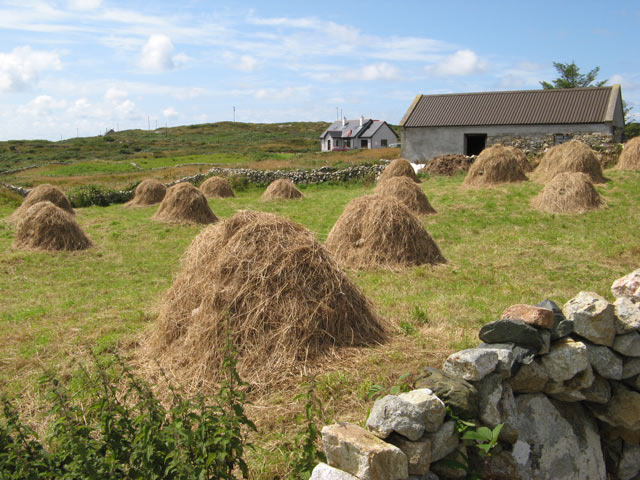
Hay cocks in a field in Ireland

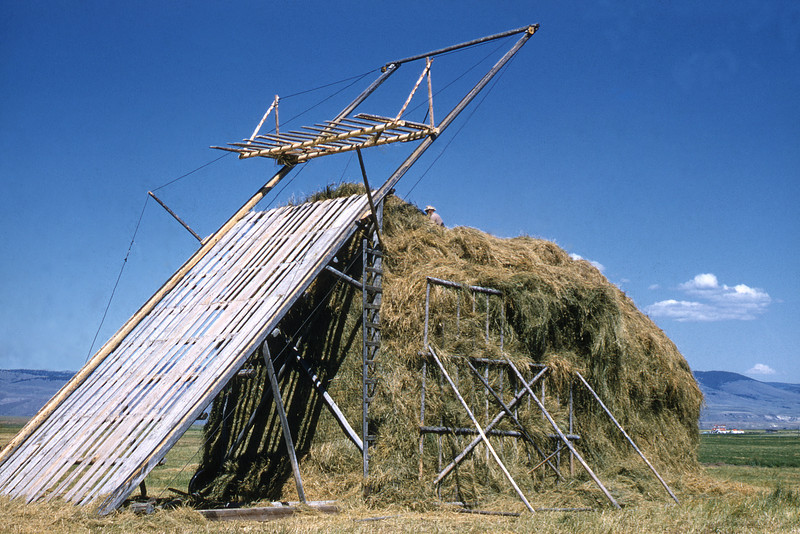
A beaverslide with a full stack of hay in Montana, USA

== Safety ==
=== Mold ===
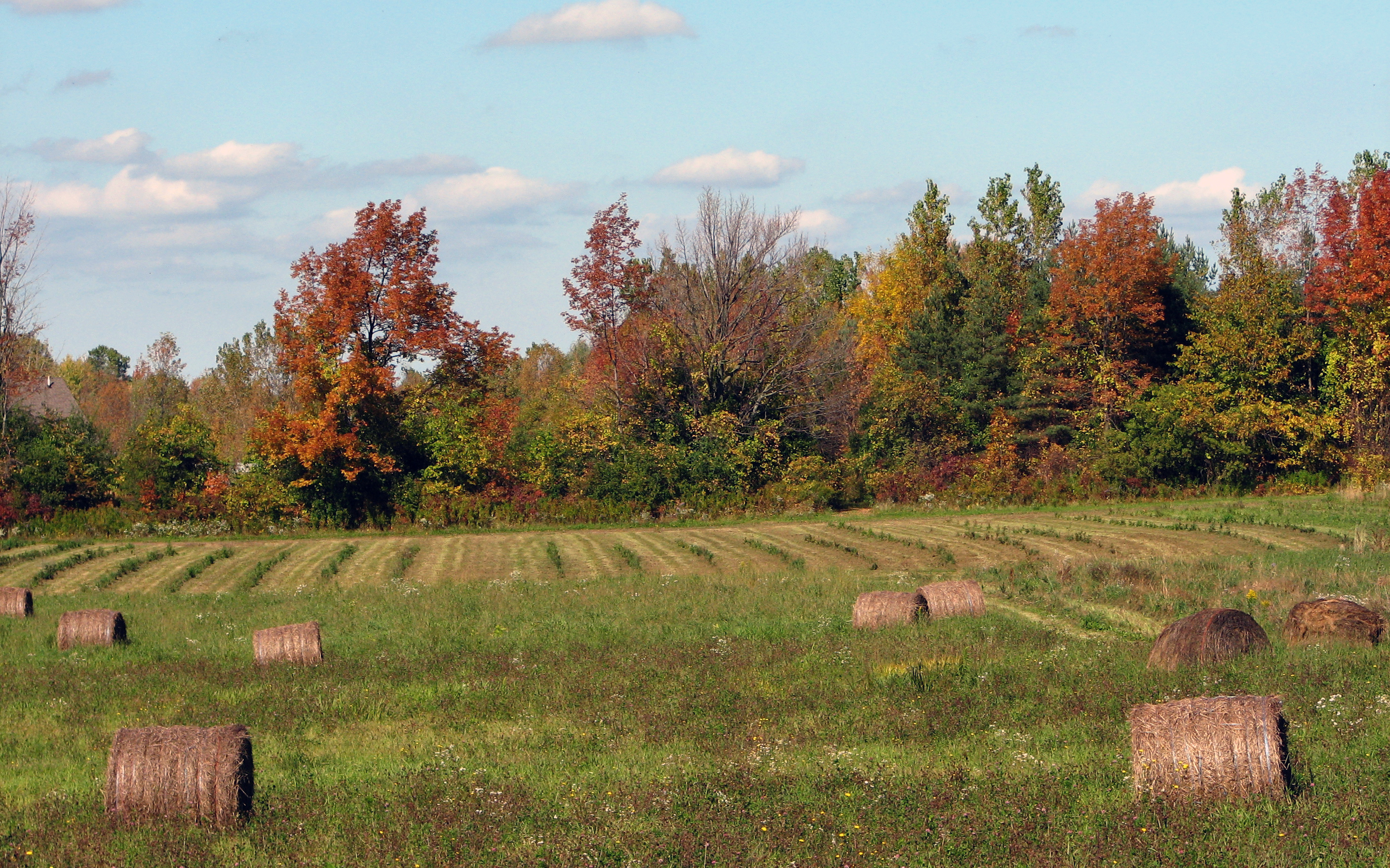
These round bales have been left in the field for many months, perhaps more than a year, exposed to weather, and appear to be rotting. Not all animals can safely eat hay with rot or mold.

Hay is generally one of the safest feeds to provide to domesticated grazing herbivores. Amounts must be monitored so animals do not get too fat or too thin. Supplemental feed may be required for working animals with high energy requirements.

Animals who eat spoiled hay may develop a variety of illnesses, from coughs related to dust and mold, to various other illnesses, the most serious of which may be botulism, which can occur if a small animal, such as a rodent or snake, is killed by the baling equipment, then rots inside the bale, causing a toxin to form. Some animals are sensitive to particular fungi or molds that may grow on living plants. For example, an endophytic fungus that sometimes grows on fescue can cause abortion in pregnant mares. Some plants themselves may also be toxic to some animals. For example, Pimelea, a native Australian plant, also known as flax weed, is highly toxic to cattle.

Farmer's lung is a hypersensitivity pneumonitis induced by the inhalation of biologic dusts coming from hay dust or mold spores or other agricultural products. Exposure to hay can also trigger allergic rhinitis for people who are hypersensitive to airborne allergens.

=== Spontaneous combustion ===
Hay must be fully dried when baled and kept dry in storage. If hay is baled while too moist or becomes wet while in storage, there is a significant risk of spontaneous combustion. Hay stored outside must be stacked in such a way that moisture contact is minimal. Some stacks are arranged in such a manner that the hay itself sheds water when it falls. Other methods of stacking use the first layers or bales of hay as a cover to protect the rest. To completely keep out moisture, outside haystacks can also be covered by tarps, and many round bales are partially wrapped in plastic as part of the baling process. Hay is also stored under a roof when resources permit. It is frequently placed inside sheds, or stacked inside of a barn. On the other hand, care must also be taken that hay is never exposed to any possible source of heat or flame, as dry hay and the dust it produces are highly flammable.

Hay baled before it is fully dry can produce enough heat to start a fire. Haystacks produce internal heat due to bacterial fermentation. If hay is stacked with wet grass, the heat produced can be sufficient to ignite the hay causing a fire. Farmers have to be careful about moisture levels to avoid spontaneous combustion, which is a leading cause of haystack fires. Heat is produced by the respiration process, which occurs until the moisture content of drying hay drops below 40%. Hay is considered fully dry when it reaches 20% moisture. Combustion problems typically occur within five to seven days of baling. A bale cooler than 120 °F (49 °C) is in little danger, but bales between 120 and 140 °F (49 and 60 °C) need to be removed from a barn or structure and separated so that they can cool off. If the temperature of a bale exceeds more than 140 °F (60 °C), it can combust.

To check hay moisture content, the farmer can use a hand, an oven or a moisture tester. The most efficient way is to use a moisture tester which shows the moisture content in a few seconds.

=== Weight ===
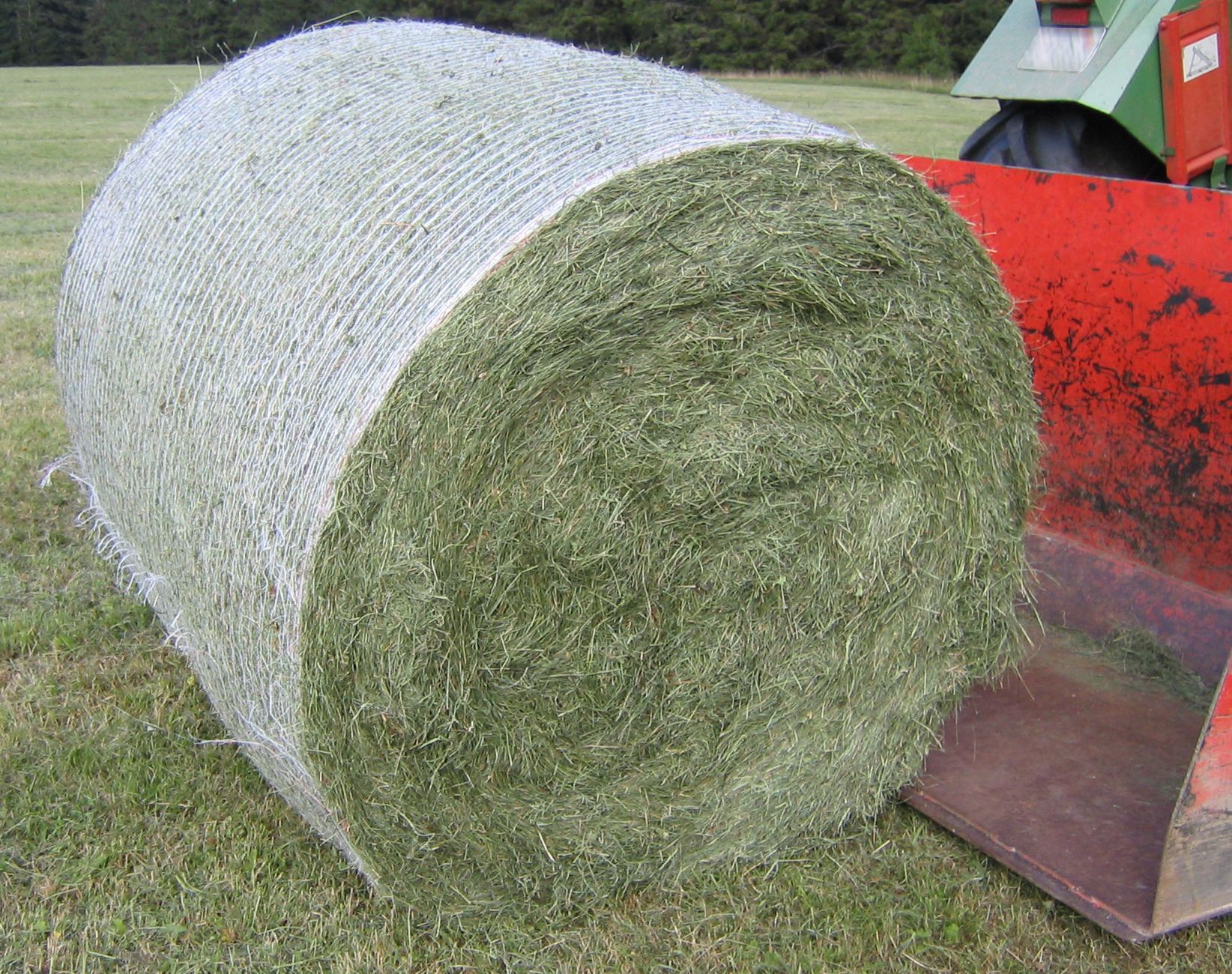
Round bales require equipment to handle. This round bale is partially covered with net wrap, which is an alternative to twine.

Due to its weight, hay can cause a number of injuries to humans, particularly those related to lifting and moving bales, as well as risks related to stacking and storing. Hazards include the danger of having a poorly constructed stack collapse, causing either falls to people on the stack or injuries to people on the ground who are struck by falling bales. Large round hay bales present a particular danger to those who handle them, because they can weigh over 1,000 pounds (450 kg) and cannot be moved without special equipment. Nonetheless, because they are cylindrical in shape, and thus can roll easily, it is not uncommon for them to fall from stacks or roll off the equipment used to handle them. From 1992 to 1998, 74 farm workers in the United States were killed in large round hay bale accidents, usually when bales were being moved from one location to another, such as when feeding animals.

== Chemical composition ==
Chemical composition
Description	Water	Ash	Albuminoids	Crude fiber	Extractive matter free from nitrogen	Fat
Meadow hay (poor)	14.3	5.0	7.5	33.5	38.2	1.5
Meadow hay (average)	14.3	6.2	9.7	26.3	41.6	2.3
Meadow hay (good)	15.0	7.0	11.7	21.9	42.3	2.2
Meadow hay (prime)	16.0	7.7	13.5	19.3	40.8	2.6
Red clover hay (poor)	15.0	5.0	7.5	33.5	38.2	1.5
Red clover hay (average)	16.0	5.3	12.3	26.0	38.2	2.2
Red clover hay (good)	16.5	5.3	12.3	26.0	38.2	2.2
Red clover hay (prime)	16.5	7.0	15.3	22.2	35.8	3.2
Protein fiber
Grasses
Timothy	14.3	5.0	7.5	33.5	38.2	1.5
Redtop	8.9	5.2	7.9	28.6	47.5	1.9
Ky. blue grass	9.4	7.7	10.4	19.6	50.4	2.5
Orchard grass	9.9	6.0	8.1	32.4	41.0	2.6
Meadow fescue	20.0	6.8	7.0	25.9	38.4	2.7
Brome grass	11.0	9.5	11.6	30.8	35.2	1.8
Johnson grass	10.2	6.1	7.2	28.5	45.9	2.1
Legumes
Alfalfa	8.4	7.4	14.3	25.0	42.7	2.2
Red clover	20.8	6.6	12.4	21.9	33.8	4.5
Crimson clover	9.6	8.6	15.2	27.2	36.6	2.8
Cowpea	10.7	7.5	16.6	20.1	42.2	2.9
Soybean	11.3	7.2	15.4	22.3	38.6	5.2
Barley	10.6	5.3	9.3	23.6	48.7	2.5
Oats	16.0	6.1	7.4	27.2	40.6	2.7

== See also ==
- Export hay
- Hay lot
- National Hay Association
