= North Meadow, Cricklade =

Hay meadow near Cricklade, Wiltshire, England

Coordinates: 51.65012°N 1.86553°W

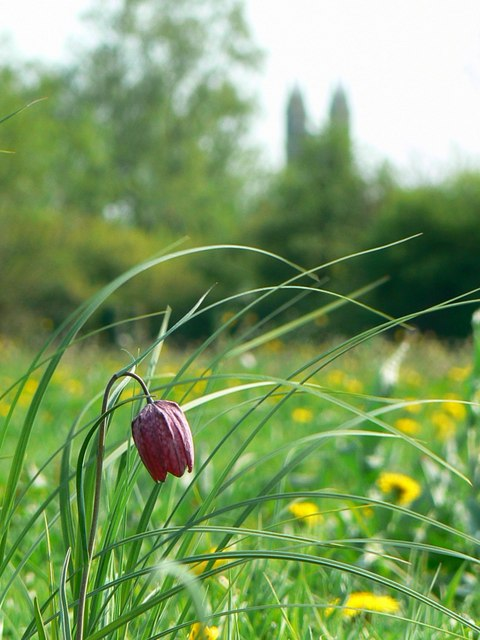
A snake's head fritillary in the North Meadow, Cricklade

North Meadow, Cricklade (grid reference SU094946) is a hay meadow near the town of Cricklade, in Wiltshire, England. It is 24.6 hectares in size. It is a traditionally managed lowland hay-meadow, or lammas land, and is grazed in common between 12 August and 12 February each year, and cut for hay no earlier than 1 July. This pattern of land use and management has existed for many centuries and has resulted in the species rich grassland flora and fauna present on the site.

Over 250 species of higher plant occur in the meadow, but it is of particular note as it holds by far the largest British population of the snake's-head fritillary (Fritillaria meleagris). The 500,000 fritillaries which flower each year represent 80% of the British population.

== History ==
The meadow is situated between two rivers, the Thames and the Churn, and the unique habitat for the fritillary was created by regular winter flooding. Such meadows were once common in Britain, but with the advent of modern farming many were drained and ploughed for arable crops from the 1730s onwards. In the case of North Meadow, it escaped such a fate by virtue of the preservation of the Court Leet, the Saxon system of town governance which made sure the land was held in common. The land is managed by Natural England and is run with the support of the Court Leet. The ancient Hay Lot stones which once marked local farmers' plots can still be seen within the meadow.

The meadow was notified as a biological Site of Special Scientific Interest in 1971. Part of the site has been designated a national nature reserve.

== Flora and fauna ==
The site includes for many types of grasses, such as red fescue (Festuca rubra), perennial rye grass (Lolium perenne), meadow foxtail (Alopecurus pratensis), crested dog's tail (Cynosurus cristatus), yellow oatgrass (Trisetum flavescens), meadow brome (Bromus commutatus), and meadow barley (Hordeum brachyantherum). The meadow is also rich in various herbs including typical hayfield species pepper saxifrage (Silaum silaus), yellow rattle (Rhinanthus minor), great burnet (Sanguisorba officinalis), black knapweed (Centaurea nigra), adder's tongue (Ophioglossum vulgatum), common meadowrue (Thalictrum flavum), and ragged robin (Lychnis flos-cuculi). Other meadow flowers include for common knapweed (Centaurea nigra), meadow buttercup (Ranunculus acris), yellow rattle (Rhinanthus minor), cowslip (Primula veris), meadowsweet (Filipendula ulmaria), and ox-eye daisy (Leucanthemum vulgare).

The meadow is surrounded by rivers, streams and drainage ditches which add to the biological diversity of the site, with many species of bank-side plant present including for slender tufted-sedge (Carex acuta), marsh arrowgrass (Triglochin palustris), and great water-dock (Rumex hydrolapathum), tubular water-dropwort (Oenanthe fistulosa), marsh marigold (Caltha palustris), marsh foxtail (Alopecurus geniculatus), early marsh-orchid (Dactylorhiza incarnata), and brown sedge (Carex disticha).

As may be expected for such abundant flora, there is also a rich and diverse insect and reptile fauna present on the site. Typical meadow butterflies include for meadow brown (Maniola jurtina), common blue (Polyommatus icarus), small heath (Coenonympha pamphilus), and the marsh fritillary (Euphydryas aurinia). Bordering hedges support gatekeeper (Pyronia tithonus), ringlet (Aphantopus hyperantus), and speckled wood (Pararge aegeria) butterflies. There are also 14 species of dragonfly recorded including the brown hawker (Aeshna grandis), black-tailer skimmer (Orthetrum cancellatum) and the ruddy darter (Sympetrum sanguineum). The common frog is also prevalent.

The meadow also supports a large variety of birds, including great tits, blue tits, common chaffinches, linnets and treecreepers within the bordering hedges; whilst grey wagtails, reed buntings, sedge warblers, barn swallows, sand martins and swifts can be found around the rivers and ditches.
