= Export hay =

Animal fodder produced for export

Export hay is hay that is produced for export markets. In Australia and other countries around the world, hay needs to meet a number of quality standards before it can be exported. Because hay in standard round and large square bales is not dense enough to be economically exported to overseas markets, export hay is normally processed to increase the density of the product and improve its suitability for containerization. This form of processing was pioneered by ACX Pacific Northwest, and is often referred to as double compression. This process allows forage and roughage exporters to inspect and package the hay prior to shipping.

In Australia, Oaten hay is the most common type of export hay. Alfalfa (also known as lucerne in Australia) is also grown for export hay, often under irrigation, and is the most common type of export hay in the U.S.
