= Hermetic storage =

Method of storage of agricultural commodities

Hermetic storage is a method of using sealed, airtight units to control moisture and insects in stored dry agricultural commodities. The hermetic storage restricts gas exchanges between the internal and external environments and the stored commodity, maintaining the initial levels of moisture and controlling pests by the lack of oxygen.

The available oxygen in the internal ecosystem is reduced to lethal or limiting levels for any living organisms through the biological activity related to gas exchange of the respiration of grains and organisms, allowing the hermetic storage a way to reduce the attack of insects and fungi on the stored food. Hermetic storage also allows for organic storage without chemical pesticides.

== See also ==
- Hay steaming
