= Tedder (machine) =

Agricultural machine used in haymaking

A Molon belt rake/tedder tedding hay

A tedder (also called hay tedder) is a machine used in haymaking. It is used after cutting and before windrowing, and uses moving forks to aerate or "wuffle" the hay and thus speed drying before baling or rolling. The use of a tedder allows the hay to dry ("cure") better, which prevents mildew or fermentation.

== History ==
There are few implements that give more general satisfaction in use or that are simpler in construction and operation than the hay tedder.

— Robert L. Ardrey, American Agricultural Implements

The tedder came into use in the second half of the nineteenth century. While Charles Wendel claims in his Encyclopedia of American farm implements & antiques that the machine wasn't introduced to the United States until the 1880s, there are enough indications that the tedder was in use in the 1860s—The New York Times reports on its efficacy in 1868, and in that same year the Annual Report of the Commissioner of Agriculture in Maine comments on the American-made Hubbard's hay tedder, which had been on the market since 1863; according to the Maine report, in 1859 the machine was "an implement lately imported from England."

The action of the tedder is described, in the late 19th and early 20th century, as being used to "stir" or "scatter" cut hay in the field.

== Operation ==
The original tedder is a farm tool on two wheels pulled by a horse; the rotation of the axle drives a gear which operates a "number of arms with wire tines or fingers at the lower ends." The tines pick up the hay and disperse it; usually, the height at which the tines pick up the hay can be adjusted.

In an early, simple hay tedder described in 1852 and manufactured in Edinburgh by the company of Mr. Slight, the two wheels, via a spur wheel and a pinion, drive a set of light wheels, the "rake wheels"; on these two rake wheels are mounted eight rakes, which pick up and disperse the hay. A later "English hay-tedder" uses two separate cylinders with rotating forks that can be reversed to lay the hay down lightly for improved exposure to air.

American machines, such as those made by companies such as Garfield, Mudgett, and Bullard (Ezekiel W. Bullard of Barre, Massachusetts, is credited in one source with the invention of the machine, nicknamed "the grasshopper"), typically used a system with a revolving crank in the middle of the arm and a lever at the upper end, or a system whereby rotating wheels moved the forks up and down. The first tedder widely available on the American market was the already mentioned Bullard's Hay Tedder, which had forks moving up and down on a compound crank, working in a motion described as "the energetic scratching of a hen." The American Hay Tedder, made by the Ames Plow Company of Boston and described in 1869 as a "new machine, remarkable for its simplicity and perfection of working, was more like the British machine in its rotational operation.

Some tedders have the rotating tines enclosed inside a solid structure to increase the force applied to the hay. Other similar machines included the Wuffler and the acrobat. The Wuffler shuffles the hay in a manner similar to the tedder. The acrobat may be used also for turning, and for rowing hay up ready for baling.

== Use and importance ==
Its development was of great importance to agriculture, since it saved labor and thus money: using a tedder, one person and one draft animal could do as much work as fifteen manual laborers. It also resulted in greater economy, since cut grass could be turned into hay the same day even if it had become wet or been trampled by horses and before its nutritional value could be reduced by repeated soaking from rain. Especially in humid areas (such as the Eastern United States), the invention of the tedder added greatly to improved hay production from such crops as alfalfa and clover, and allowed for haying while the grass was still green which produced hay of much higher value.

== Gallery ==
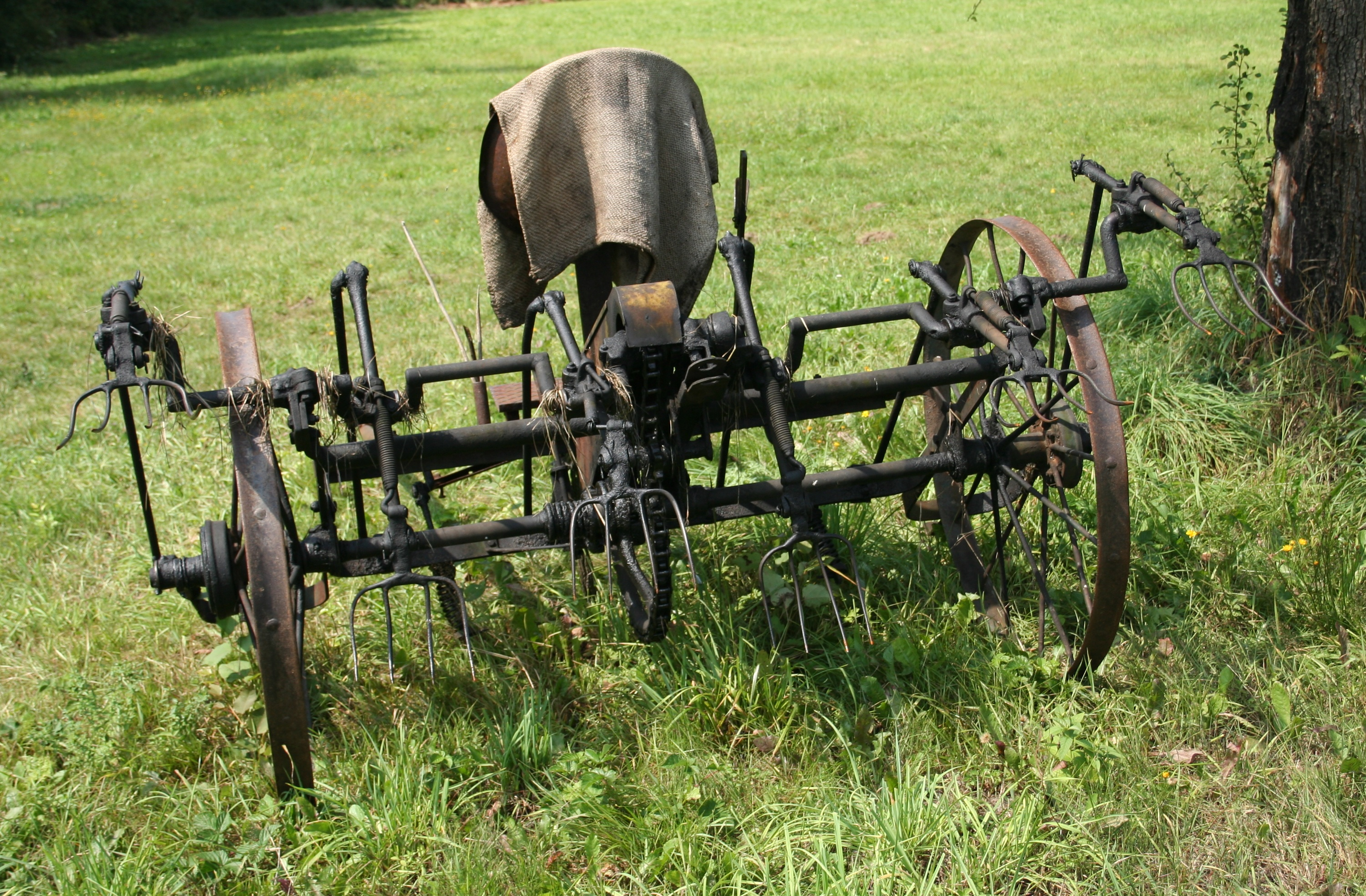
A retired hay tedder

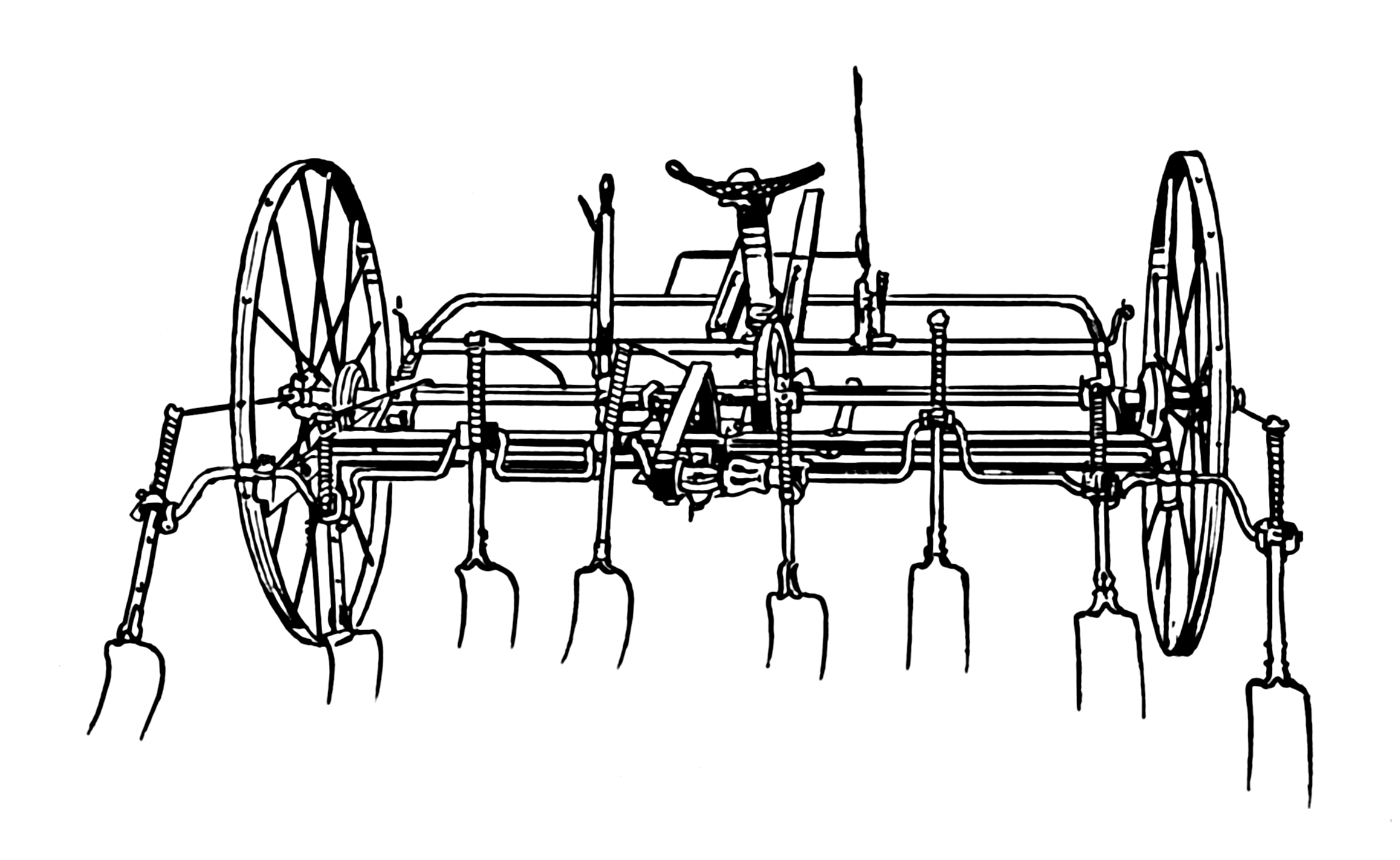
A hay tedder, similar to a standard American model of the early 20th century, with tines shaped like pitchfork ends

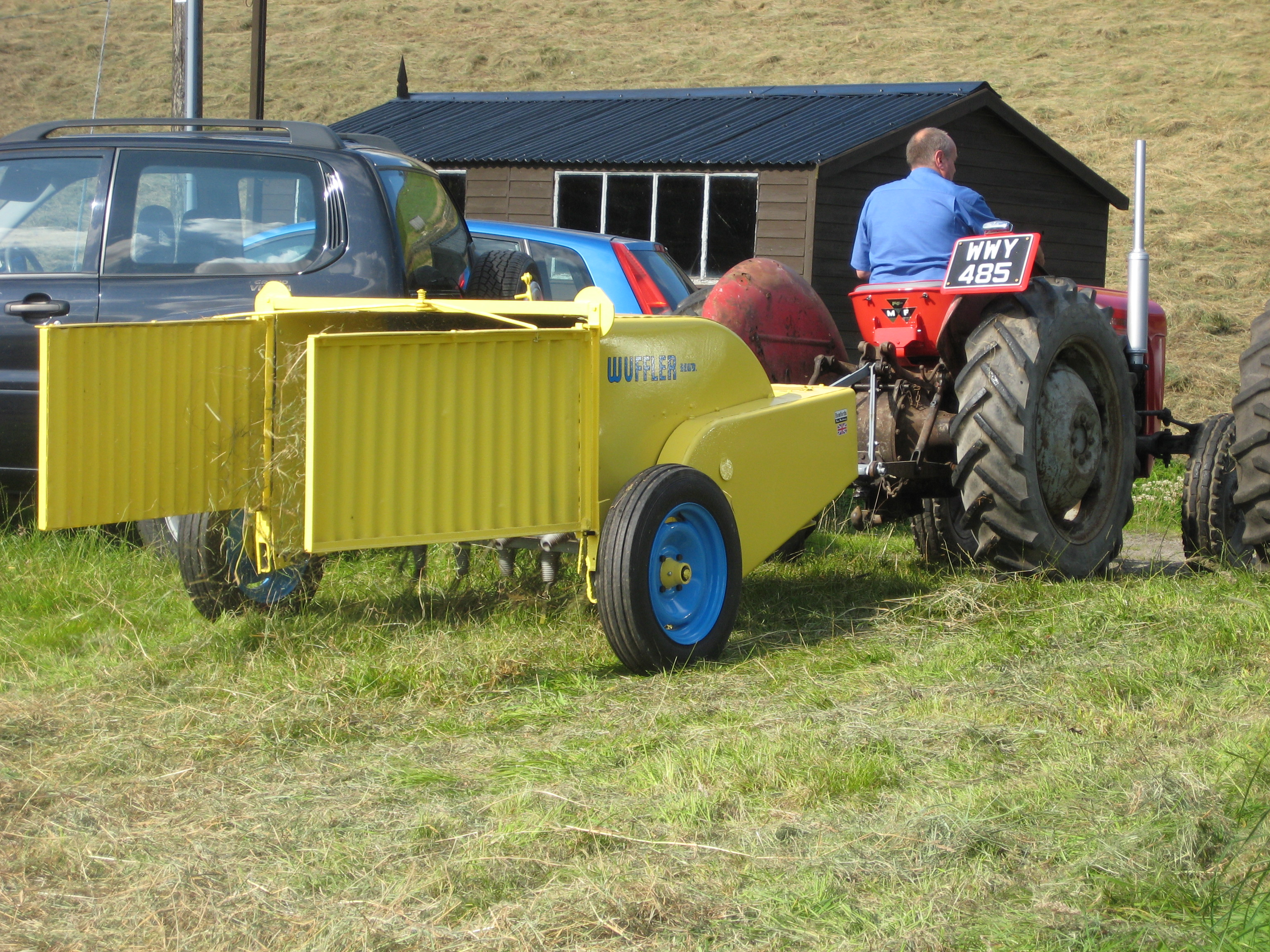
A Bamford Wuffler

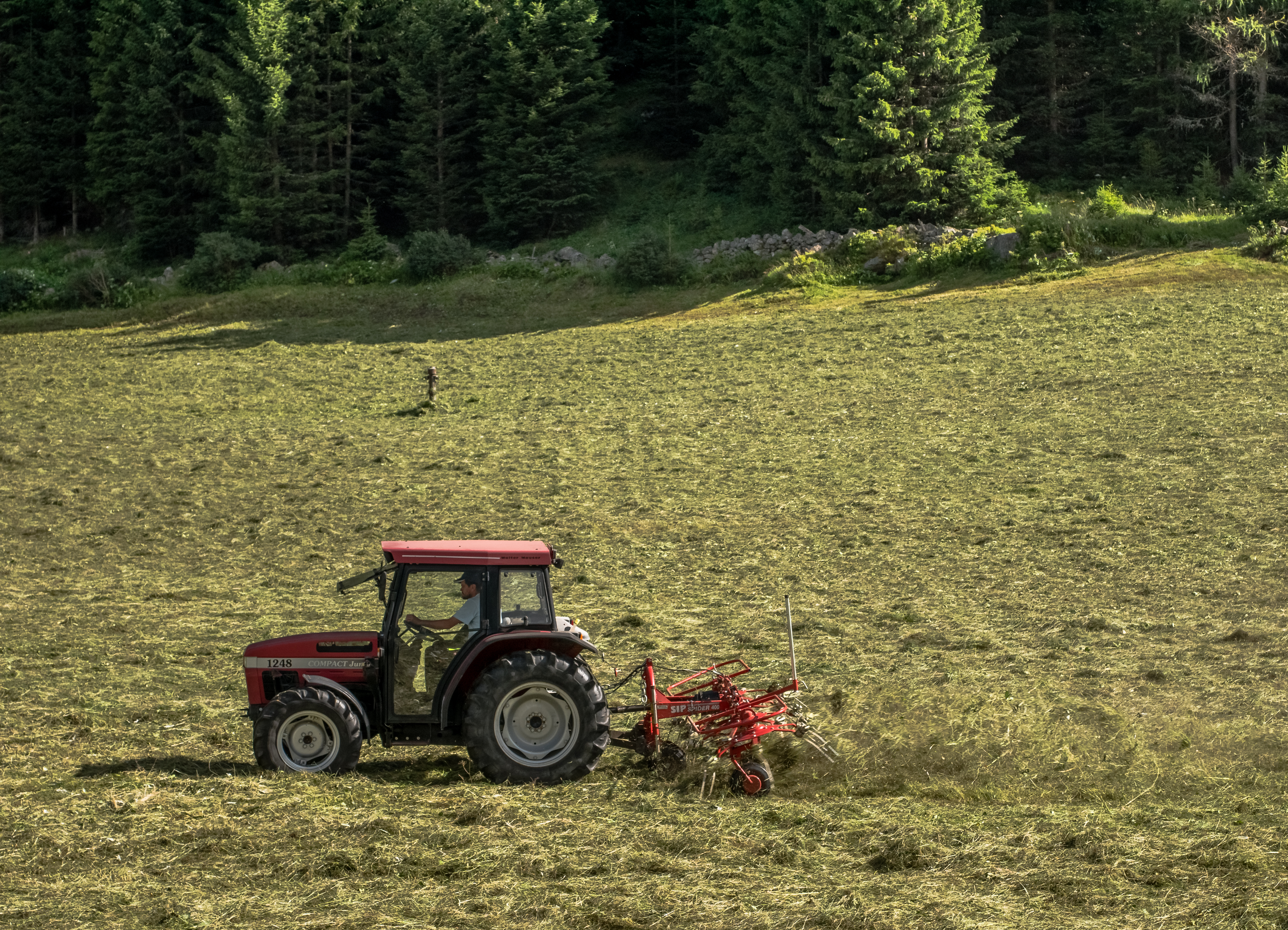
Tractor with rotary tedder

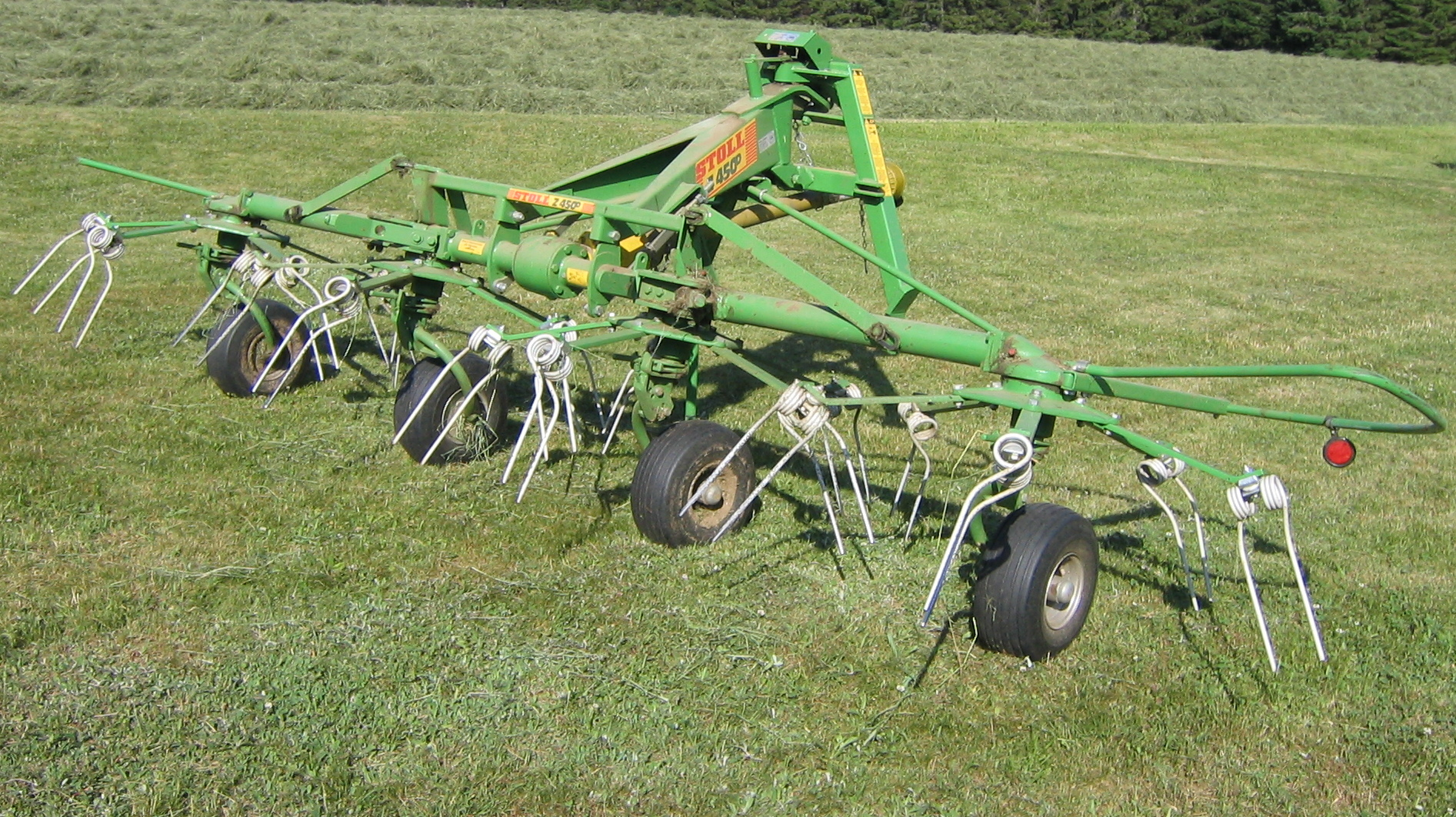
A modern tedder

== See also ==
- List of agricultural machinery
