= Beaverslide =

Device for stacking hay

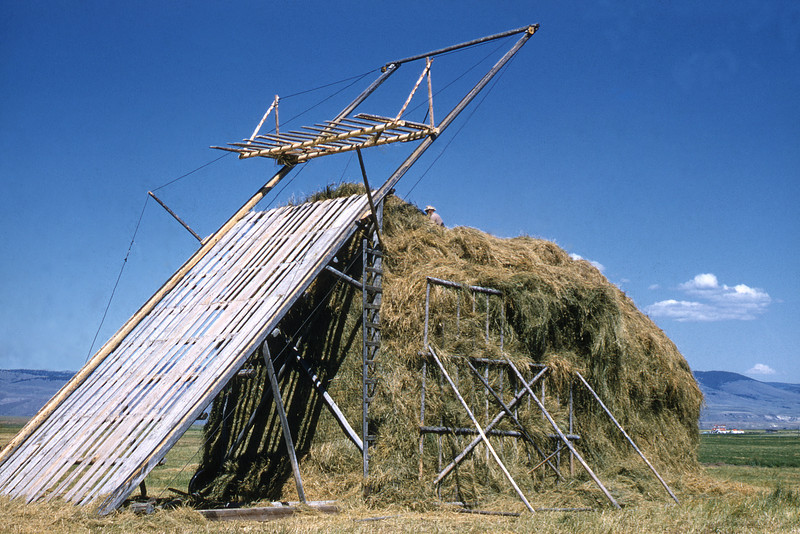
A beaverslide with a full stack of hay.

A beaverslide is a device for stacking hay, made of wooden poles and planks, that builds haystacks of loose, unbaled hay to be stored outdoors and used as fodder for livestock. The beaverslide consists of a frame supporting an inclined plane up which a load of hay is pushed to a height of about 30 feet (9 m), before dropping through a large gap. The resulting loaf-shaped haystacks can be up to 30 feet high, can weigh up to 20 tons, and can theoretically last up to five or six years. It was invented in the early 1900s and was first called the Beaverhead County Slide Stacker after its place of origin, the Big Hole Valley in Beaverhead County, Montana. The name was quickly shortened to "beaverslide."

== History ==
Early settlers in the American west initially stored hay for their livestock under shelter in barns and haylofts. However, unlike the east, where hay is fed as a supplemental form of forage, the northern plains had lengthy and severe winter weather and therefore large quantities of hay were needed to provide adequate forage for animals. Most haylofts were insufficient to store the quantities needed, but in the arid western United States, unlike the more humid east, hay could be stored without the protection of a barn. As a result, settlers used a variety of methods to stack and store large amounts of hay, inventing a number of agricultural machines to lift hay including hay derricks and various slides, including a predecessor to the beaverslide called a ram stacker.

About 1908 (Note: Sources vary on the exact year the beaverslide was invented, varying from 1907 to 1910; note though that the patent was filed on September 7, 1909 and awarded on May 31, 1910 (US Patent 959906).) the beaverslide was invented in Montana by two ranchers, Herbert S. Armitage and David J. Stephens, (Note: Stephens' first name is listed as "David" on the patent but he is often listed elsewhere as "Dade", which may have been a nickname (US Patent 959906).) who ranched near Briston, in the Big Hole Valley, of Beaverhead County in southwestern Montana. Armitage and Stephens filed for a patent on September 7, 1909 and it was awarded on May 31, 1910. The beaverslide may have been called the "Sunny Slope Slide Stacker" at one time, but that name does not appear in the patent. Armitage and Stephens themselves referred to it as the "Beaverhead County Slide Stacker", which quickly became just "beaverslide".

The beaverslide was somewhat mobile, inexpensive, handled large amounts of hay, and was easily built. It was faster to use than early balers and made windproof haystacks. It rapidly gained popularity in southwestern Montana and adjacent parts of eastern Idaho, with its use spreading to other western states and Canada in places where light meadow grass was put up as hay. In regions where it had been adopted it remained in common use into the 1990s. While use of a beaverslide is labor-intensive, and it has not been commonly used in the 21st century, some ranchers are returning to it to save fuel costs. Still others never abandoned it because of the large cash outlay required to purchase modern mechanized balers.

== Construction ==
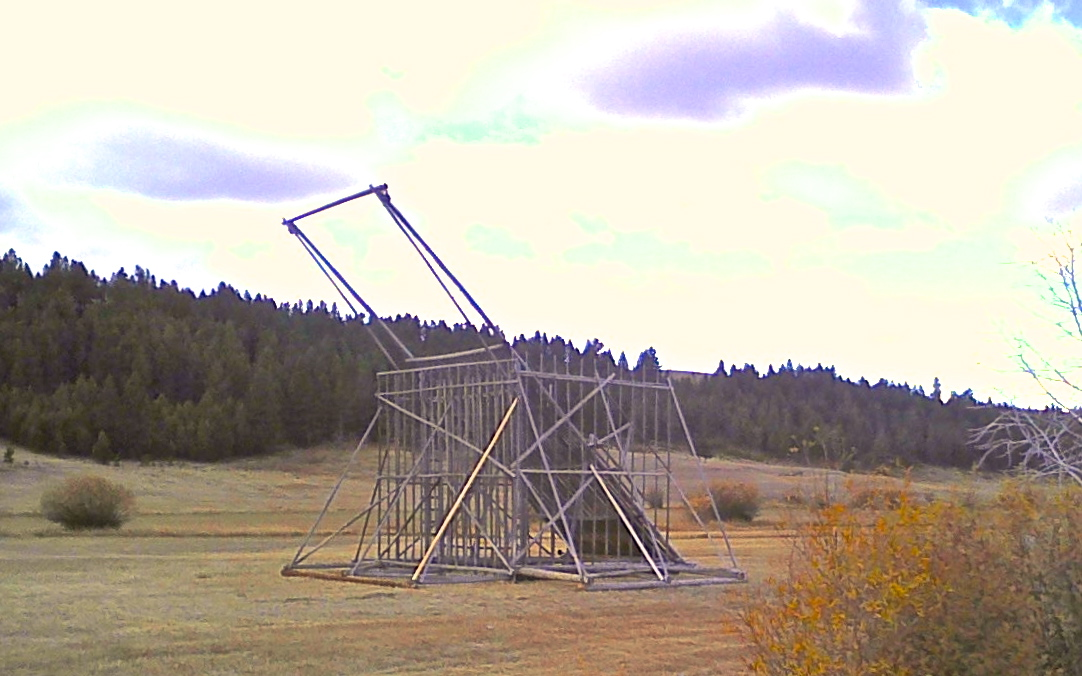
View of beaverslide without haystack

The beaverslide is constructed of a rigid pole frame in the form of a right-angle triangle that supports a steeply inclined, slatted, plank ramp, with or without sides, approximately 50–60 feet (15–18 m) long. The size and angle of individual beaverslides varies greatly and reflects local needs. Beaverslides were originally of all-wooden construction, usually lodgepole pine, and could last 10 to 15 years. In the 1970s, some components began to be made of metal, which are longer-lasting. The inclined ramp, about 15–20 feet (5–6 m) wide, is made of smooth wooden or metal slats and is about two thirds the length of the poles. In the 1920s it became possible to extend the height of the slide so that the hay could be thrown further. In the 1950s movable wings were placed on either side of the ramp so that the hay could be stacked more neatly. A flat, toothed wooden platform called a "basket" or rack is suspended by a system of cables and pulleys from the poles. It is raised to bring hay to the top of the slide, and then lowered back down along the length of the ramp. A backstop, usually an open wooden grid held up by poles, is set at the far end of the stack helps hold the completed stack in place. A fence of wood panels or other materials is often placed around the stack to keep out livestock.

== Use ==
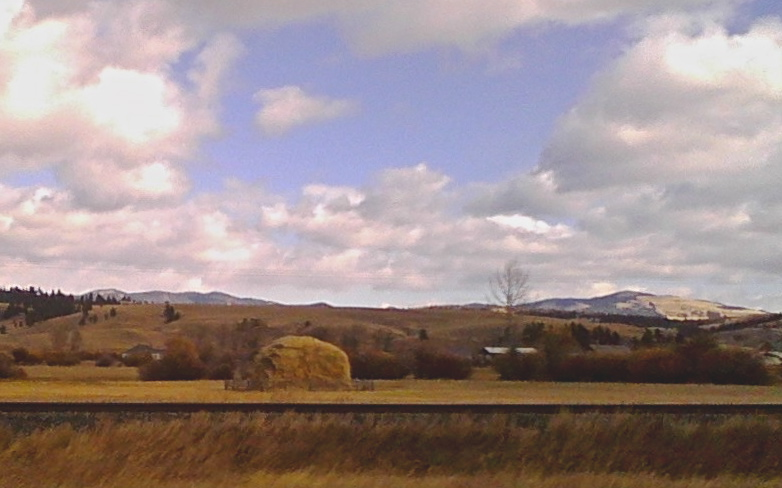
Haystack created by a beaver slide

A beaverslide will raise hay to a height that allows a haystack to be built as much as 30 feet high. A large hay crew is required, with a minimum of six people to operate all components. A load of hay is delivered to the base of the beaverslide, often pushed by a buckrake drawn by a team of horses or a tractor. The hay is loaded onto the rack, which when full is drawn up the inclined ramp by cables powered either by a second team of horses or a motorized vehicle such as a pickup or a tractor. At the top of the incline, the hay falls onto the stack and the rack is lowered for another load. The term "butt" describes the hay stacked by the beaverslide and has two meanings. A "butt" can be the amount of hay on a fully loaded rack, but the term also refers to the amount of hay that can be stacked by the beaverslide without moving it, roughly 24 tons of hay. The hay at the top of each haystack is stomped and piled higher towards the middle to allow rain to run off. Depending on the size of the field and the amount of hay produced per acre, once a beaverslide has created a stack, it can be moved a few feet to make a long, continuous haystack, or moved a longer distance to create multiple stacks within a field. Many are built on skids to facilitate being moved from field to field. If the hay is stacked properly, and remains uneaten, the hay in a beaverslide-constructed stack remains good at least two to three years, with some ranchers claiming it could last up to five or six years. In contrast, baled hay stored outdoors can begin to go bad after only one year.

== Notes ==
Explanatory notes

Citations
