= Tree hay =

Agricultural practice

Tree hay (sometimes also referred to as leaf fodder, leaf hay or tree fodder) is a source of animal fodder produced by harvesting the leaves and twigs of a variety of perennials, and in particular trees. It specifically refers to the practice of feeding the material to livestock directly after collection or more commonly after storing and sometimes drying the tree hay for a certain period of time. It hence does not include the browsing of trees and fodder hedges by livestock directly.

It is a traditional practice that was once widespread, but has been largely forgotten as grass hay became the dominant practice in modern agriculture. However, recently the interest in this ancient practice, and tree fodder more generally, have started to revive. It relates to agroforestry and sustainable farming in general through shared goals of solving climate and biodiversity challenges. In part because trees and hedges are increasingly recognised as valuable elements beneficial for biodiversity and landscape. Additionally, a growing body of scientific research indicates that tree leaves can potentially serve as an additional source of relevant nutrients for livestock.

== History ==
Producing tree hay was once a common and widespread practice across Europe. Trees were often an essential source of seasonal livestock fodder for many agrarian communities. For some it was structurally part of the fodder stock in winter. In other regions trees were more of a backup source in case of failing grass hay production, for example due to extreme summer weather. Either way, trees were essential for the resilience of traditional agrarian communities..

Tree hay was most commonly harvested in the summer, possibly dried and stored until the hay was fed to the livestock in the winter. Cutting and drying methods varied per region, but a common practice was the bundling of 60 to 200 cm long twigs held together with twisted twigs of willow or hazel.

The tree species that were harvested depended on the local conditions and culture as well as the type of livestock that was held and their preferences for certain species. In Europe's moderate climate zones Elm and ash seem to have been popular as fodder sources. But in harsh winters or after bad growing seasons even species like ivy and holly are known to have been cut as fodder.

== Nutritional value ==
Trees are part of the natural diet of sheep (20%), goats (60%), horses (15%) and cattle (10%). However, the nutritional value of trees can be very variable and is influenced by many different factors. Every species contains different nutrients in different amounts and the nutrients will also vary depending on soil type and season. Analysing tree fodder on site can be important to give insight to the nutritional value of a specific situation. However, the seasonal variations don't seem significant enough as to when the fodder should be fed.

Generally, the in-vitro organic matter digestibility of tree leaves in comparison to grass is relatively low. But crude protein and mineral levels of some species are relatively high, which makes tree fodder a valuable complementary source of nutrients

Dried tree leaves contain higher mineral levels compared to fresh leaves. Making tree hay a valuable source of minerals outside of the growing season. Tree fodder as a source of magnesium, selenium, zinc and copper in particular is interesting, as these minerals are significantly higher in some trees compared to grass.

=== Secondary compounds ===
In addition to macro and micro nutrients, many tree fodder contain a number of secondary compounds that have medicinal properties. The most common secondary compounds are tannins. Tannins have a positive effect on the digestion of protein in ruminants and have shown to reduce intestinal parasites.

=== Comparison to alfalfa ===
==== White mulberry ====
Alfalfa is considered one of the most nutrient-dense fodders for livestock. But when compared to for example white mulberry (Morus alba) leaves, we see that the mulberry is superior to alfalfa in most nutritional values. Mulberry contains on average less protein than alfalfa, but the difference is less than 1% (fresh and dried). Mulberry still contains 19% protein on average, ranging from 11% to 25% . Moreover, mulberry contains less crude fiber making it more palatable and animals can ingest more of it before they are full.

Mulberry contains less amino acids, but in better ratios, improving the overall digestibility. Mulberry also has better absorption of nutrition for animals. Because of this, animals may need to eat less, which can reduce the farmers' costs.

Mulberry contains more secondary compounds, tannins in particular. When mulberry leaves are dried the tannin levels increase significantly. Alfalfa contains mostly saponins and flavonoids and does not contain any tannins. Mulberry leaves are rich in flavonoids. This increases biodiversity of the gut bacteria, causing more efficient digestion of nutrients and fiber and reduces methane emissions. The flavonoids in mulberry are also antioxidant, antimicrobial and anti-inflammatory.

== Different systems in use today ==
In modern practices tree hay is considered to be a complementary fodder source for livestock to diversify and balance their diets. As nutritional values vary depending on species, local conditions and season a farm specific approach is always necessary in combination with monitoring livestock performance in response to changes in diet.

The simplest method to feed tree leaves may still be to allow livestock to directly browse trees or hedges. This does, however, require careful management. The production of tree hay is also labor-intensive, although there are possibilities to further mechanize this practice.

It is possible to harvest from existing trees or hedges or alternatively planting trees for the purpose of harvesting tree hay. Trees in a pasture or hedges along field boundaries are a possibility as well as more plantation like planting of trees that are optimized for mechanical coppicing. Depending on the chosen system different cutting methods might be needed. Mechanization options are available for coppicing, pollarding or pruning trees.

In recent experiments trees where cut and harvest material was bundled and stored freshly or green mixing several species. Many of these bundles still had green leaves after 1 or 2 seasons in storage with still some green leaves after 24 months. Processing tree hay from leaves and young twigs can be done in the same way as conventional grass hay, including silaging and baling. Also, chipping the material has been found to be a possibility to process and store tree hay.

== Advantages over annual crops ==
Because of the deeper root systems and their mycorrhizal fungal associations, under certain conditions trees can access more nutrients and moisture than for example annual crops. Hence trees can function as a buffer or backup fodder source in case of disappointing yields of grass hay or other livestock fodder, e.g. in extreme circumstances or to deal with the usual pasture growth dynamics.

Because of this, but also because of species-specific characteristics, tree hay may contain specific nutrients, such as minerals, that may provide in certain health needs of livestock in addition to regular fodder. Tree hay could therefore contribute to a more varied diet and enable livestock with the opportunity to self-medicate.

The practice of producing tree hay, or tree fodder more broadly speaking, has hence the potential to once again become an integral part of the agricultural enterprise enhancing its resilience. As a consequence trees and hedges can reclaim a central place on the farm and in the landscape together with all the benefits of trees for landscape, biodiversity and nature. Trees and hedges are for instance beneficial to soil quality as they do not require tilling like annual crops, which for example causes the soil to store less carbon in the long term .
