= Hay lot =

Portion of common land used for haymaking

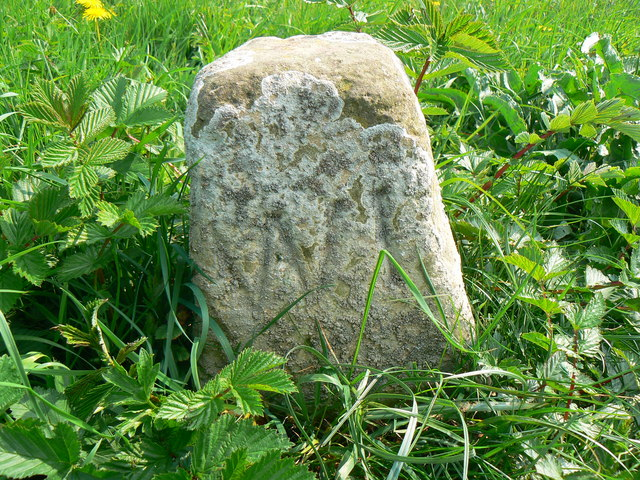
A Hay Lot marker stone as found in the North Meadow, Cricklade, United Kingdom.

A Hay Lot is a portion of common land used for haymaking and assigned by lot or allotment. Traditionally a marker, usually of stone, was used in early agriculture to mark the position of an individual hay lot within a hay meadow. The marker stone would typically bear the initials of the lot-holder. Such markers would have been common-place in meadows in Britain, but with the advent of modern farming many hay meadows were ploughed for arable crops, and the hay lots removed. Today, few such examples remain, but some can be seen in the North Meadow at Cricklade.

In modern agriculture a Hay lot is defined as the harvest of hay from a single field undertaken within a 48-hour period. Depending upon the size of the field and the capacity of the harvesting equipment used, the amount of hay collected in this period can vary greatly, reaching up to 200 short tons (180 tonnes).

== See also ==
- Earsh
- Field
- Flood-meadow
- Grassland
- Meadow
- Pasture
