= Tedding =

Agricultural process

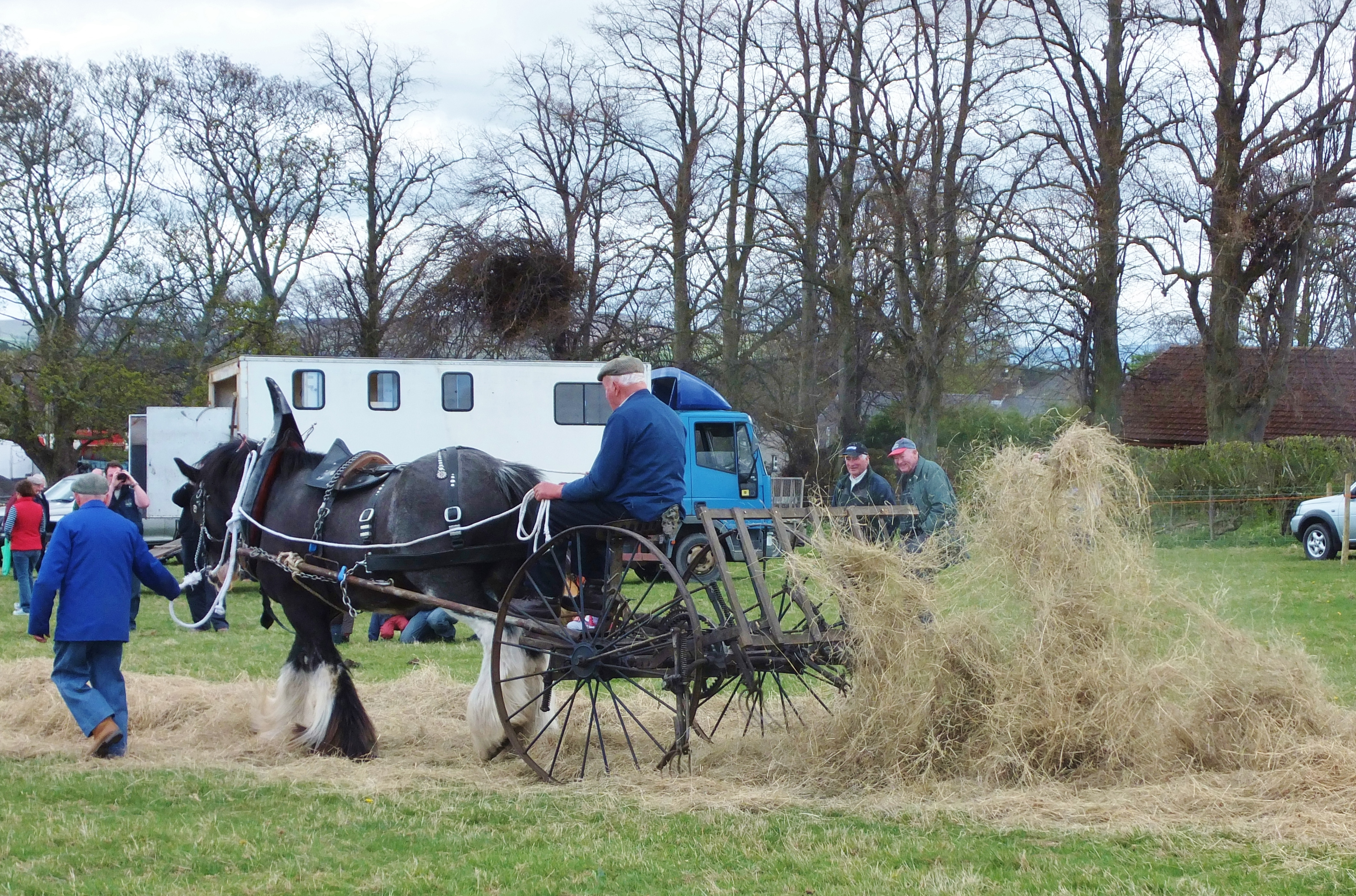
Tedding hay

Tedding is the agricultural process of spreading material in a field. The materials which are typically tedded include manure, which is spread to fertilize the land, and crops such as hay and flax, which are spread to dry them before they are collected.

Originally, this task would have been performed manually by farm labourers using tools such as pitchforks. In the 16th century, Sir Anthony Fitzherbert, in his Boke of Husbandry, emphasised the importance of tedding for good hay:

Whan thy medowes be mowed, they wolde be well tedded and layde euen vppon the grounde: and if the grasse be very thycke, it wolde be shaken with handes, or with a shorte pykforke. For good teddynge is the chiefe poynte to make good hey, and than shall it be wyddred all in lyke, or elles not: and whan it is wel wyddred on the ouer syde, and dry, than turne it cleane before noone, as soone as the dewe is gone: And yf thou dare truste the wether, lette it lye so all nyghte: and on the nexte daye, tourne it agayne before none, and towarde nyght make it in wyndrowes, and than in smal hey-cockes...

In the 19th century, farm machinery was introduced such as the manure spreader and tedder, which would be pulled by horses, traction engines or tractors.

The handling of the crop will cause loss due to breakage of the plant, especially as it becomes dry and brittle. This especially affects the leaves of hay crops such as alfalfa and this is significant as they are more nutritious than the stems. These losses have been found to be 4% for alfalfa with a moisture level of 60% rising to 8% when dried to a moisture level of 40%.

There are different styles of tedding which vary in their emphasis on different actions:

- mixing and turning – to expose the damp material when it is covered by the material which has dried
- spreading – to make full use of the space
- fluffing – to aerate the material
