= Hay steaming =

Haygain hay steamers

Hay steaming is a method of treating hay to reduce the airborne respirable dust which naturally occurs in hay, causing respiratory problems in both humans and horses when in close contact. The method encompasses a steam generator which produces the steam and a connecting hose to direct the steam into a closed, sealed vessel containing the hay, exposing it to the steam.

== Importance of temperature ==
When a professionally engineered and designed high temperature steaming method is used, the temperature of the hay reaches over 100 °C. This has been scientifically proven to kill the bacteria, mould and fungal spores thereby improving the hygienic quality of hay and dramatically reducing airborne respirable dust by up to 98%. With hay steaming, however, if the required high temperatures are not reached it can have a detrimental effect on the hygiene quality of the hay by creating an "incubator effect", leading to a dramatic increase in observed bacteria.

Expectation is that only hay steamers which are able to steam from the inside out (specifically injecting steam via spikes from deep within the hay, rather than from the outside in, releasing the steam from underneath the hay) and with the hay being steamed while placed in an insulated vessel, are able to reach the requisite temperatures to avoid dramatically increasing bacteria. This may, however, create effluent runoff with very high bacterial levels. Some designs have demonstrated effective reduction of bacteria in the hay and effluent runoff by 99+% without the need for spikes.

== Home made versions ==
A number of homemade hay steamers have been tested, usually consisting of a "wheelie-bin" and a "wall paper stripper," and all failed to reach the needed temperatures to avoid the incubator effect. There are no published studies linking this effect to any specific ill effects in horses, though it is generally agreed to be undesirable. Importantly, studies have shown homemade hay steamers to have some beneficial effect in reducing dust and mould spores and, when normally acceptable n-values are used to process the results data, the difference is material but not extreme.

== Soaking versus steaming ==
Before hay steamers were invented, horse owners would soak hay in a bucket or tub of water for anything from 10 minutes to 12 hours and then drain it. A 10-minute soak has been shown to reduce respirable dust by up to 90%. This method uses water to dampen down the dust so it is less likely to be inhaled. Blundell et al., 2012 however, found hay steaming to be much more effective at reducing respirable dust particles in hay than soaking.

Soaking hay also has undesirable consequences in terms of bacteria levels; tests show soaking increases bacterial concentrations by 1.5-fold to fivefold. In addition, the nutritional value of soaked hay is decreased as it leaches out water-soluble carbohydrates, protein and minerals.

Also the post-soak liquid from soaked hay is classed as an environmental pollutant as it has a high biological oxygen demand. A prolonged soak has been shown to produce a post-soak liquid 9 times more polluting than raw sewage and should not be put down storm drains. In the UK DEFRA advises that the run-off from hay soaking should be directed to an impermeable lagoon or a sealed effluent tank. The liquid can then be removed by a licensed contractor for off-site disposal.

Blundell et al. confirmed similar findings to Warr and Petch for soaked hay waste water and found far reduced polluting effects of waste water from steaming. They concluded additional environmental benefits of steaming through the volume of water required for treatment. Hay steaming uses around 4 litres of water per cycle, most of which is absorbed by the hay or released into the air as steam leaving just a small amount of non-polluting waste water.

Wyss et al. (2016) warned soaked hay left for up to three days before being fed or horses finish consuming it, has very high bacterial counts and is considered highly spoiled, no longer be suitable for feeding.

Soaked hay is generally less palatable to horses than dry hay whereas steamed hay has found to be very palatable. Moore-Colyer and Payne (2012) studied the palatability of dry, steamed and soaked hay in a group of polo ponies who were normally fed haylage. 1 kg of each forage option was given simultaneously in three different corners of the stable. This was repeated 3 times for each horse so that each forage option was given in each corner to avoid positional preferences. The results clearly demonstrated the horses preferred to consume steamed hay to dry or soaked. Observations revealed that once steamed hay was tasted it was always the first consumed.

In concurrence with these results, Brown et al. (2013) investigated the palatability of dry hay, steamed hay and haylage and found steamed hay was the first option chosen by horses and they went on to consume more steamed hay than either dry hay or haylage within a 1-hour feeding period.

Traditionally, farmers and horse owners assess hay visually and by smell; however, even well conserved hay can contain significant levels of respirable dust. Respirable dust is defined as being less than 5 μm in size and is referred by Hessel et al. as the thoracic fraction and by Art et al. and Clements and Pirie as particles that are sufficiently small enough to penetrate the peripheral airways.

== Effect of dust ==
Dust in hay consists of a collection of naturally occurring dust particles which include organic plant and soil particles and potentially allergenic mould, fungi, bacteria, mite faeces, endotoxins and beta glucans, all of which have the potential to contribute to the development of airway inflammation and equine asthma. This is due to the fact horses are highly sensitive to respirable dust in hay especially to the mould, fungal spores and bacteria fraction. Exposure to these particles, particularly prolonged exposure has been shown to cause respiratory disease in the horse including equine asthma also known as COPD, broken wind, heaves and recurrent airway obstruction (RAO).

When Blumerich et al., 2012 fed a group of horses diagnosed with equine asthma who normally react to dry hay, steamed hay their clinical score parameters were unchanged suggesting the steaming process has reduced the allergenic portion of the respirable dust enough not to cause a reaction in these hypersensitive horses.

Researchers in Belgium discovered that when fungi is found in the horse's airways they a 3.8 times more likely to be diagnosed with inflammatory airway disease. They also analysed all forage options fed to the 482 horses in the study and found that steamed hay not only had the lowest risk of diagnosing fungi in the airways but actually lowered the risk when compared to dry hay, soaked hay and haylage.

Steaming hay has rapidly grown in popularity in the last 10 years since commercially available high temperature hay steamers have been developed and is accepted as an improvement to the old tradition of soaking hay, providing significant additional benefits. At this point, most high performance horses in Europe, and increasingly America, are already being fed steamed hay on a daily basis. At the same time, the general horse population in the UK, Germany, and other European countries are increasingly being fed steamed hay.

== See also ==
- Hermetic storage
