= National Hay Association =

The National Hay Association is a trade organization in the United States representing hay producers, dealers, brokers, and related industry professionals. Founded in 1895; 131 years ago, the association promotes quality standards for hay and supports improved marketing practices. As of 2012, it has more than 500 active members.

== Hay-making capitals ==
- Big Cabin, Oklahoma from 1883 until 1910
- Gilbert, Arizona, 1911 until the late 1920s
- Yates Center, Kansas
- Inola, Oklahoma
- Gayville, South Dakota
