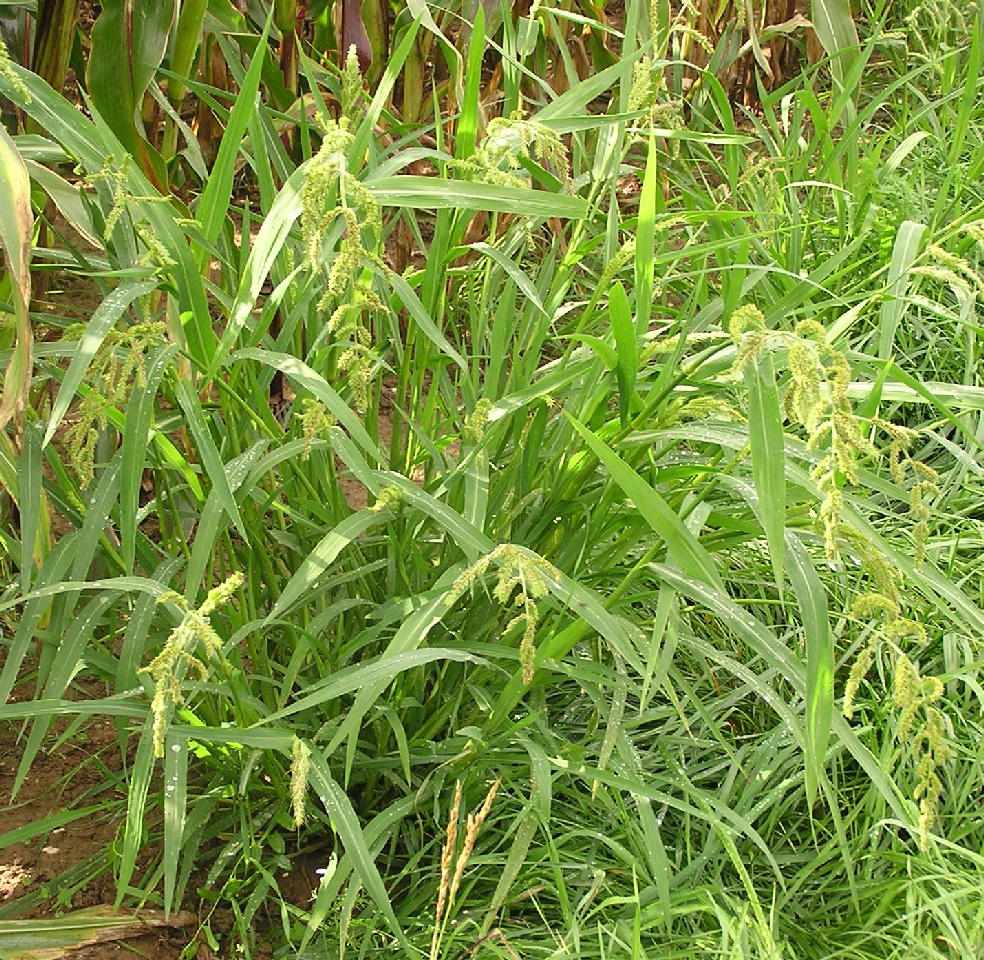
- Common barnyard grass (Echinochloa crus-galli)

Scientific classification
- Kingdom: Plantae
- Clade: Embryophytes
- Clade: Tracheophytes
- Clade: Angiosperms
- Clade: Monocots
- Clade: Commelinids
- Order: Poales
- Family: Poaceae
- Subfamily: Panicoideae
- Supertribe: Panicodae
- Tribe: Paniceae
- Subtribe: Boivinellinae
- Genus: Echinochloa; P.Beauv.

Type species
- Echinochloa crus-galli (L.) P.Beauv.

Synonyms
- Oplismenus sect. Echninochloa (P.Beauv.) Dumort.; Panicum sect. Echinochloa (P.Beauv.) Döll; Panicum sect. Echinochloa (P.Beauv.) Nees; Panicum sect. Echinochloa (P.Beauv.) Trin.; Panicum ser. Echinochloa (P.Beauv.) Benth.; Panicum subg. Echinochloa (P.Beauv.) A. Gray; Tema Adans.; Ornithospermum Durande, not validly published

= Echinochloa =

Genus of flowering plants in the grass family

Echinochloa is a very widespread genus of plants in the grass family and tribe Paniceae. Some of the species are known by the common names barnyard grass or cockspur grass.

Some of the species within this genus are millets that are grown as cereal or fodder crops. The most notable of these are Japanese millet (E. esculenta) in East Asia, Indian barnyard millet (E. frumentacea) in South Asia, burgu millet (E. stagnina) in West Africa, and channel millet (E. turneriana) in arid and semi-arid inland Australia. Collectively, the members of this genus are called barnyard grasses (though this may also refer to E. crus-galli specifically), and are also known as barnyard millets or billion-dollar grasses.

When not grown on purpose, these grasses may become a nuisance to farmers. In particular, common barnyard grass (E. crus-galli) is notorious as a weed. It is not easily suppressed with living mulches such as velvet bean (Mucuna pruriens var. utilis). Early barnyard grass (E. oryzoides) is a well-known example of Vavilovian mimicry: the plants have evolved to resemble rice (Oryza), enabling them to escape weeding more easily.

Among the plant pathogens that affect this genus are the sac fungus Cochliobolus sativus, which has been noted on common barnyard grass, and rice hoja blanca virus. Both affect many other grass species, in particular most important cereals, and Echinochloa weeds may serve as a reservoir. The fungi Drechslera monoceras and Exserohilum monoceras have been evaluated with some success as potential biocontrol agents of common barnyard grass in rice fields. More research is necessary, however, because they may not be host-specific enough to be of practical use. Insect pests include Atherigona falcata, the barnyard millet shoot fly.

== Species ==
Species

- Echinochloa brevipedicellata
- Echinochloa callopus
- Echinochloa chacoensis
- Echinochloa colona – shama grass, samo
- Echinochloa crus-galli – common barnyard grass, cockspur grass
- Echinochloa crus-pavonis – gulf cockspur grass - southwestern + south-central USA; Mexico, Honduras
- Echinochloa elliptica
- Echinochloa esculenta – Japanese millet
- Echinochloa frumentacea – Indian barnyard millet
- Echinochloa glabrescens
- Echinochloa haploclada
- Echinochloa helodes
- Echinochloa holciformis
- Echinochloa inundata
- Echinochloa jaliscana - Jalisco
- Echinochloa jubata
- Echinochloa kimberleyensis
- Echinochloa lacunaria
- Echinochloa macrandra
- Echinochloa muricata – rough barnyard grass, American barnyard grass - widespread in Canada, USA, northern Mexico
- Echinochloa obtusiflora
- Echinochloa oplismenoides - Mexico, Guatemala, Arizona
- Echinochloa oryzicola
- Echinochloa oryzoides – early barnyard grass
- Echinochloa paludigena - Florida, Cuba, Puerto Rico
- Echinochloa picta
- Echinochloa pithopus
- Echinochloa polystachya - from Texas, Louisiana, + West Indies to Argentina
- Echinochloa praestans
- Echinochloa pyramidalis
- Echinochloa rotundiflora
- Echinochloa stagnina – burgu millet
- Echinochloa telmatophila
- Echinochloa turneriana – channel millet - semi-arid and arid inland Australia
- Echinochloa ugandensis
- Echinochloa walteri – Walter's barnyard grass - Quebec, Ontario, USA (Northeast, Southeast, Midwest, South-central, California); much of Latin America + West Indies

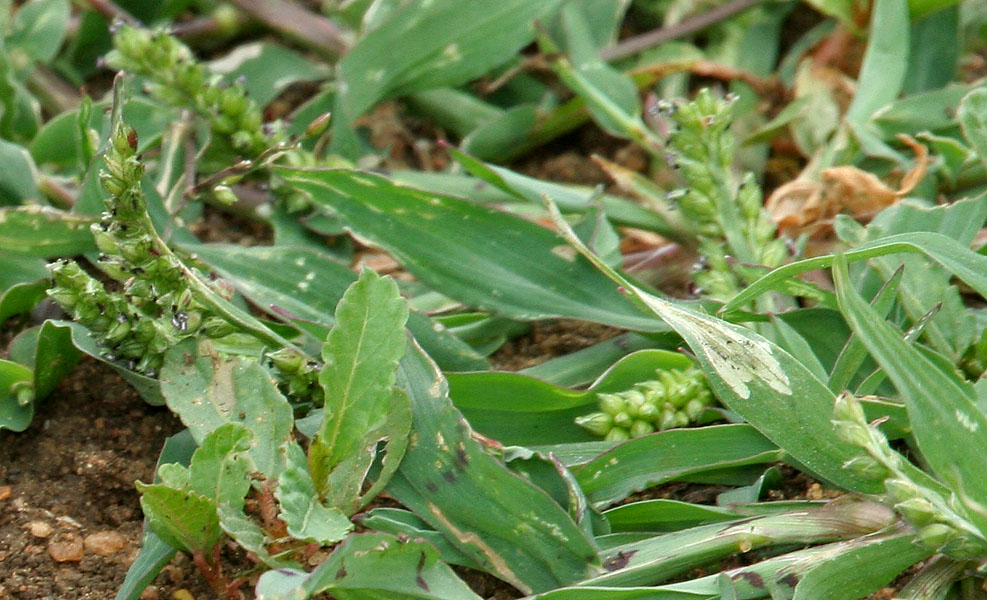
jungle rice (Echinochloa colona)

Formerly included

see Acroceras, Axonopus, Brachiaria, Oplismenopsis, Oplismenus, Panicum, Pseudechinolaena, Setaria, Urochloa

- Echinochloa compressa - Axonopus compressus
- Echinochloa cubensis - Oplismenus hirtellus
- Echinochloa echinata P.Beauv. not (Willd.) Nakai 1952 - Pseudechinolaena polystachya
- Echinochloa elephantipes - Panicum elephantipes
- Echinochloa eruciformis - Brachiaria eruciformis
- Echinochloa erythrosperma - Setaria italica
- Echinochloa geminata - Paspalidium geminatum
- Echinochloa hirta - Urochloa panicoides
- Echinochloa intermedia - Setaria italica
- Echinochloa lanceolata - Oplismenus compositus
- Echinochloa najada - Oplismenopsis najada
- Echinochloa nervosa - Acroceras gabunense
- Echinochloa notabilis - Urochloa mosambicensis
- Echinochloa polystachya (Kunth) Roberty 1954 not (Kunth) Hitchc. 1920- Pseudechinolaena polystachya
- Echinochloa pulchella - Panicum pulchellum
- Echinochloa ramosa - Brachiaria ramosa
- Echinochloa reptans - Brachiaria reptans
- Echinochloa setigera - Urochloa setigera
- Echinochloa setosum - Setaria setosa
- Echinochloa squarrosa - Pseudoraphis spinescens
- Echinochloa subcordata - Brachiaria reptans
- Echinochloa zizanioides - Acroceras zizanioides
