= Baler =

Farm machine for creating hay bales

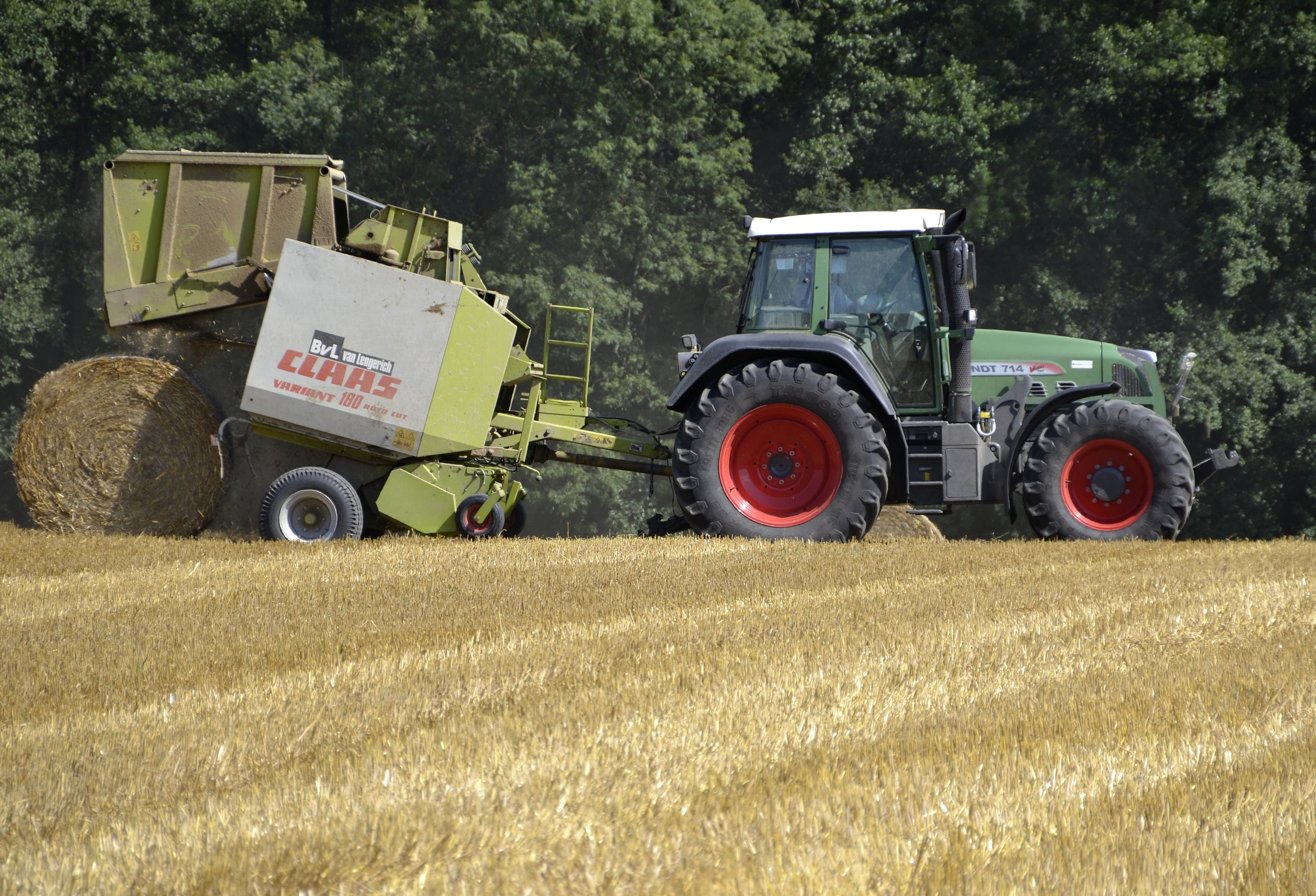
A Claas large round baler

Baling hay

A baler, or hay baler, is a piece of farm machinery used to compress a cut and raked crop (such as hay, cotton, flax straw, salt marsh hay, or silage) into compact bales that are easy to handle, transport, and store. Often, bales are configured to dry and preserve some intrinsic (e.g. the nutritional) value of the plants bundled. Different types of balers are commonly used, each producing a different type of bale – rectangular or cylindrical, of various sizes, bound with twine, strapping, netting, or wire.

Industrial balers are also used in material recycling facilities, primarily for baling metal, plastic, or paper for transport.

== History ==
Before the 19th century, hay was cut by hand and most typically stored in haystacks using hay forks to rake and gather the scythed grasses into optimally sized heaps – neither too large, promoting conditions favorable for spontaneous combustion, nor too small, which would mean much of the pile is susceptible to rotting. These haystacks lifted most of the plant fibers up off the ground, letting air in and water drain out, so the grasses could dry and cure, to retain nutrition for livestock feed at a later time.

In the 1860s, mechanical cutting devices were developed; from these came modern devices including mechanical mowers and balers. In 1872, a reaper that used a knotter device to bundle and bind hay was invented by Charles Withington; this was commercialized in 1874 by Cyrus McCormick. In 1936, Innes invented an automatic baler that tied bales with twine using Appleby-type knotters from a John Deere grain binder; in 1938, Edwin Nolt filed a patent for an improved version that was more reliable.

The first round baler was probably invented in the late 19th century and one was shown in Paris by Pilter (as illustrated by Michael Williams in Steam Power in Agriculture: Blandford, 1977). This was a portable machine designed for use with threshing machines.

== Round baler ==
Round baler dumping a fresh bale

The most common type of baler in industrialized countries today is the round baler. It produces cylinder-shaped "round" or "rolled" bales. The design has a "thatched roof" effect that withstands weather. Grass is rolled up inside the baler using rubberized belts, fixed rollers, or a combination of the two. When the bale reaches a predetermined size, either netting or twine is wrapped around it to hold its shape. The back of the baler swings open, and the bale is discharged. The bales are complete at this stage, but they may also be wrapped in plastic sheeting by a bale wrapper, either to keep hay dry when stored outside or convert damp grass into silage. Variable-chamber large round balers typically produce bales from 48 to 72 inches (120 to 180 cm) in diameter and up to 60 inches (150 cm) in width. The bales can weigh anywhere from 1,100 to 2,200 pounds (500 to 1,000 kg), depending upon size, material, and moisture content. Common modern small round balers (also called "mini round balers") produce bales 20 to 22 inches (51 to 56 cm) in diameter and 20.5 to 28 inches (52 to 71 cm) in width, generally weighing from 40 to 55 pounds (18 to 25 kg).

Originally conceived by Ummo Luebben circa 1910, the first round baler did not see production until 1947 when Allis-Chalmers introduced the Roto-Baler. Marketed for the water-shedding and light weight properties of its hay bales, AC had sold nearly 70,000 units by the end of production in 1960.

The next major innovation began in 1965 when a graduate student at Iowa State University, Virgil Haverdink, sought out Wesley F. Buchele, a professor of Agricultural Engineering, seeking a research topic for a master thesis. Over the next year, Buchele and Haverdink developed a new design for a large round baler, completed and tested in 1966, and thereafter dubbed the Buchele–Haverdink large round baler. The large round bales were about 1.5 meters (4.9 feet) in diameter, 2 meters (6.6 feet) long, and they weighed about 270 kilograms (600 pounds) after they dried – about 80 kg/m^{3 (}5 lb/ft^{3)}. The design was promoted as a "Whale of a Bale" and Iowa State University now explains the innovative design as follows:

Farmers were saved from the backbreaking chore of slinging hay bales in the 1960s, when Iowa State agricultural engineering professor Wesley Buchele and a group of student researchers invented a baler that produced large, round bales that could be moved by tractor. The baler has become the predominant forage-handling machine in the United States.

In the summer of 1969, the Australian Econ Fodder Roller baler came out, a design that made a 135 kg (298 lb) ground-rolled bale. In September of that same year, The Hawkbilt Company of Vinton, Iowa, contacted Dr. Buchele about his design, then fabricated a large ground-rolling round baler which baled hay that had been laid out in a windrow, and began manufacturing large round balers in 1970.

In 1972, Gary Vermeer of Pella, Iowa, designed and fabricated a round baler after the design of the A-C Roto-Baler, and the Vermeer Company began selling its model 605 – the first modern round baler. The Vermeer design used belts to compact hay into a cylindrical shape as is seen today.

In the early 1980s, collaboration between Walterscheid and Vermeer produced the first effective uses of CV joints in balers, and later in other farm machinery. Due to the heavy torque required for such equipment, double Cardan joints are primarily used. Former Walterscheid engineer Martin Brown is credited with "inventing" this use for universal joints.

By 1975, fifteen American and Canadian companies were manufacturing large round balers.

=== Transport, handling, and feeding ===
==== Short-haul transport and on-field handling ====
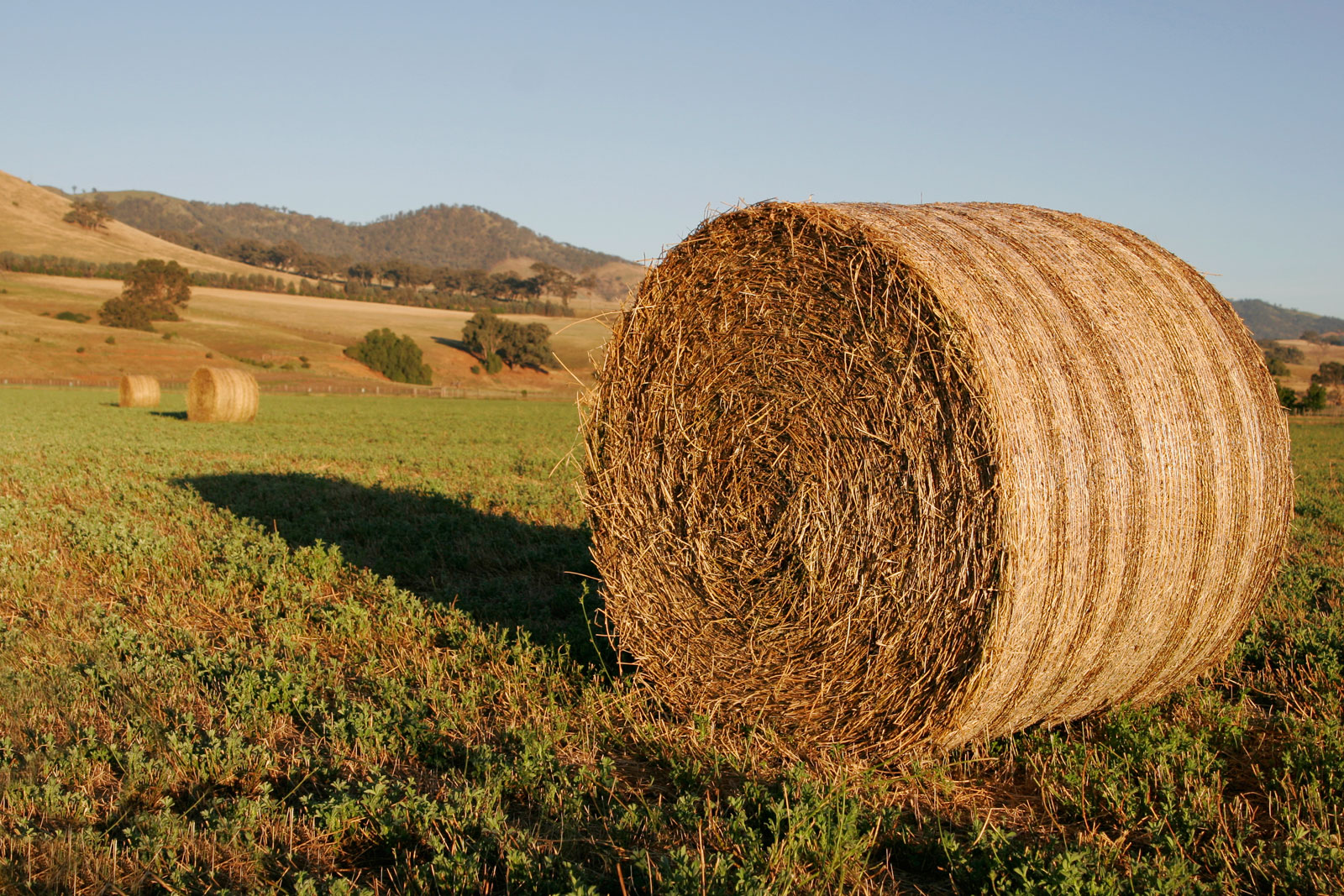
A large round bale

Due to the ability for round bales to roll away on a slope, they require specific treatment for safe transport and handling. Small round bales can typically be moved by hand or with lower-powered equipment. Due to their size and their weight, which can be a ton or more, large round bales require special transport and moving equipment.

The most important tool for large round bale handling is the bale spear, or spike, which is usually mounted on the back of a tractor or the front of a skid-steer loader. It is inserted into the approximate center of the bale, then lifted, and the bale is hauled away. Once at the destination, the bale is set down and the spear pulled out. Careful placement of the spear in the center is needed or the bale can spin around and touch the ground while in transport, causing a loss of control. When used for wrapped bales that are to be stored further, the spear makes a hole in the wrapping that must be sealed with plastic tape to maintain a hermetic seal.

Alternatively, a grapple fork may be used to lift and transport large round bales. The grapple fork is a hydraulically driven implement attached to the end of a tractor's bucket loader. When the hydraulic cylinder is extended, the fork clamps downward toward the bucket, much like a closing hand. To move a large round bale, the tractor approaches the bale from the side and places the bucket underneath the bale. The fork is then clamped down across the top of the bale, and the bucket is lifted with the bale in tow. Grab hooks installed on the bucket of a tractor are another tool used to handle round bales, and can be done by a farmer with welding skills by welding two hooks and a heavy chain to the outside top of a tractor front loader bucket.

==== Long-haul transport ====
The rounded surface of round bales poses a challenge for long-haul, flat-bed transport, as they could roll off of the flat surface if not properly supported. This is particularly the case with large round bales; their size makes them difficult to flip, so it may not be feasible to flip many of them onto the flat surface for transport and then re-position them on the round surface at the destination. One option that works with both large and small round bales is to equip the flat-bed trailer with guard rails at either end, which prevent bales from rolling either forward or backward. Another solution is the saddle wagon, which has closely spaced rounded saddles or support posts in which round bales sit. The tall sides of each saddle prevent the bales from rolling around while on the wagon, as the bale settles down in between posts. On 3 September 2010, on the A381 in Halwell near Totnes, Devon, England, Mike Edwards an early member of British rock group ELO was killed when his van was crushed by a large round bale. The cellist, 62, died instantly when the 600-kilogram (1,300 lb) bale fell from a tractor on nearby farmland before rolling onto the road and crushing his van.

==== Feeding ====
A large round bale can be directly used for feeding animals by placing it in a feeding area, tipping it over, removing the bale wrap, and placing a protective ring (a ring feeder) around the outside so that animals will not walk on hay that has been peeled off the outer perimeter of the bale. The round baler's rotational forming and compaction process also enables both large and small round bales to be fed out by unrolling the bale, leaving a continuous flat strip in the field or behind a feeding barrier.

=== Silage or haylage ===
Video: Picking up and applying plastic cling wrap to a round bale

Video: Sealing the wrapped bales together

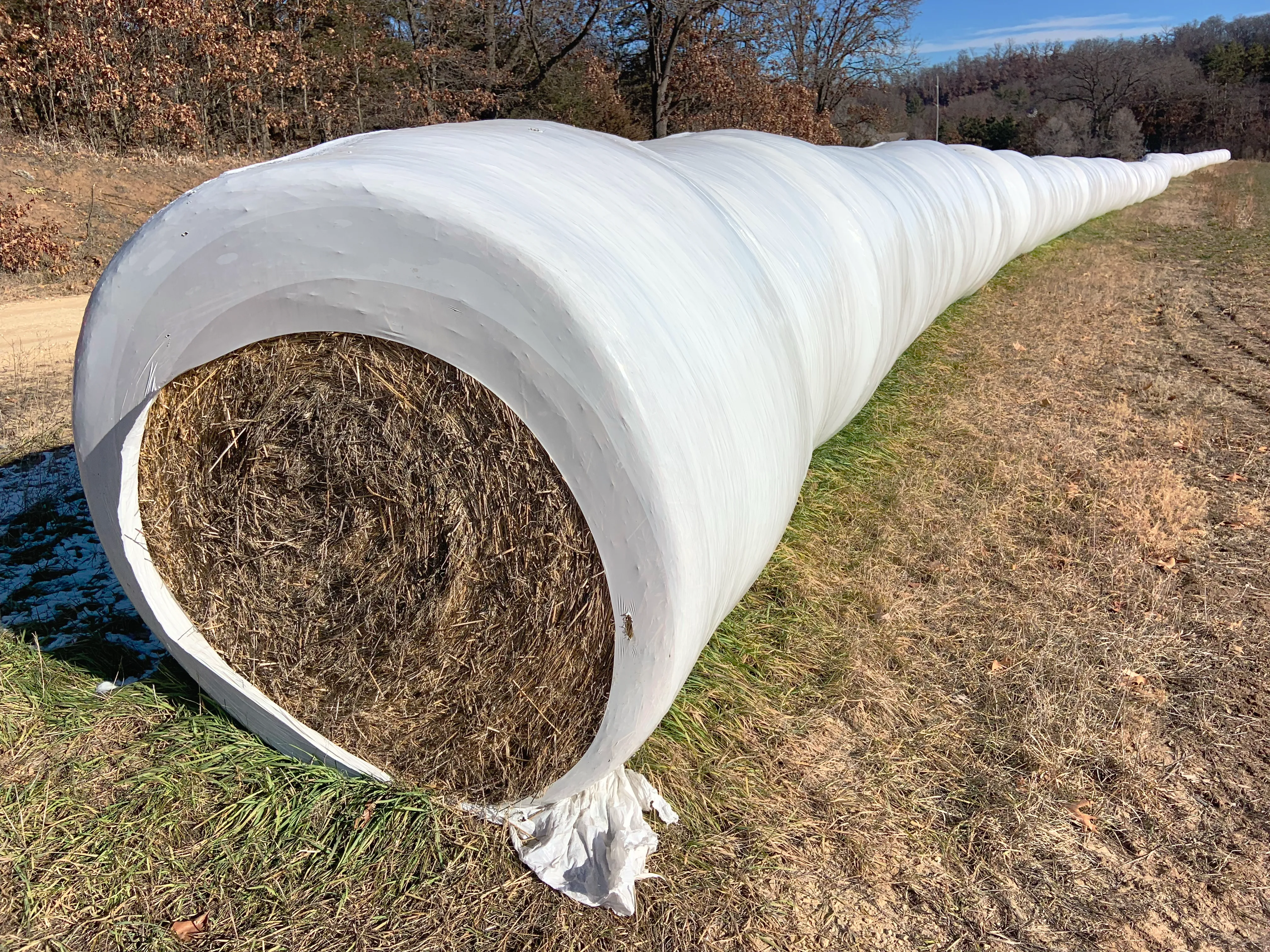
In-line bale wrapped hay

Silage, a fermented animal feed, was introduced in the late 1800s, and can also be stored in a silage or haylage bale, which is a high-moisture bale wrapped in plastic film. These are baled much wetter than hay bales, and are usually smaller than hay bales because the greater moisture content makes them heavier and harder to handle. These bales begin to ferment almost immediately, and the metal bale spear stabbed into the core becomes very warm to the touch from the fermentation process.

Silage or haylage bales may be wrapped by placing them on a rotating bale spear mounted on the rear of a tractor. As the bale spins, a layer of plastic cling film is applied to the exterior of the bale. This roll of plastic is mounted in a sliding shuttle on a steel arm and can move parallel to the bale axis, so the operator does not need to hold up the heavy roll of plastic. The plastic layer extends over the ends of the bale to form a ring of plastic approximately 12 inches (30 cm) wide on the ends, with hay exposed in the center.

To stretch the cling-wrap plastic tightly over the bale, the tension is actively adjusted with a knob on the end of the roll, which squeezes the ends of the roll in the shuttle. In the example wrapping video, the operator is attempting to use high tension to get a flat, smooth seal on the right end. However, the tension increases too much and the plastic tears off. The operator recovers by quickly loosening the tension and allows the plastic to feed out halfway around the bale before reapplying the tension to the sheeting.

These bales are placed in a long continuous row, with each wrapped bale pressed firmly against all the other bales in the row before being set down onto the ground. The plastic wrap on the ends of each bale sticks together to seal out air and moisture, protecting the silage from the elements. The end-bales are hand-sealed with strips of cling plastic across the opening.

The airtight seal between each bale permits the row of round bales to ferment as if they were in a silo bag, but they are easier to handle than a silo bag, as they are more robust and compact. The plastic usage is relatively high, and there is no way to reuse the silage-contaminated plastic sheeting, although it can be recycled or used as a fuel source via incineration. The wrapping cost is approximately US$5 per bale.

An alternative form of wrapping uses the same type of bale placed on a bale wrapper, consisting of pair of rollers on a turntable mounted on the three-point linkage of a tractor. It is then spun about two axes while being wrapped in several layers of cling-wrap plastic film. This covers the ends and sides of the bale in one operation, thus sealing it separately from other bales. The bales are then moved or stacked using a special pincer attachment on the front loader of a tractor, which does not damage the film seal. They can also be moved using a standard bale spike, but this punctures the airtight seal, and the hole in the film must be repaired after each move.

Plastic-wrapped bales must be unwrapped before being fed to livestock to prevent accidental ingestion of the plastic. Like round hay bales, silage bales are usually fed using a ring feeder.

== Large square baler ==
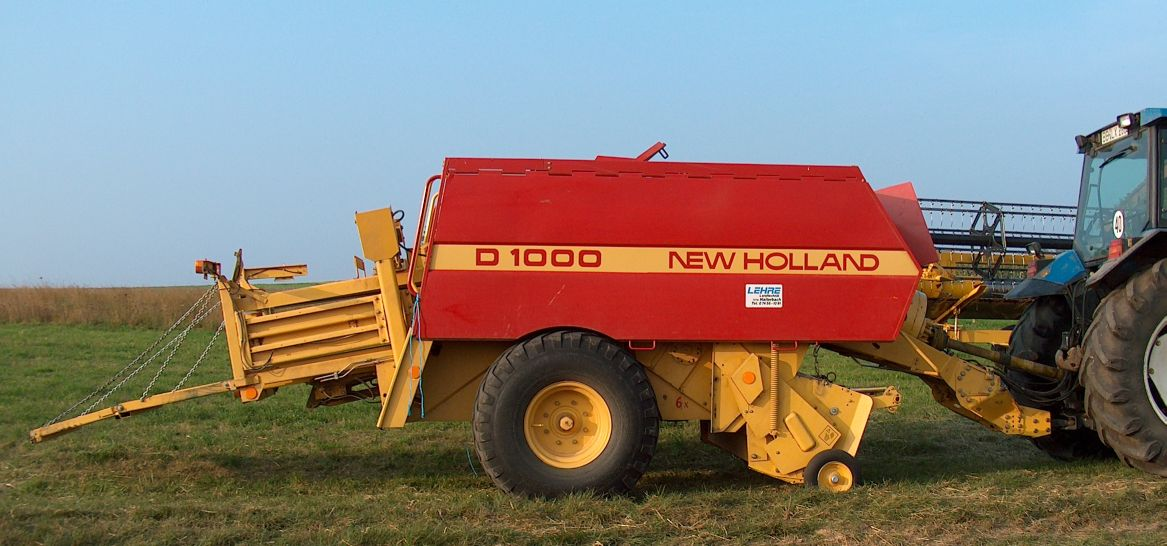
Large rectangular baler

In 1978, Hesston introduced the first "large square baler", capable of compacting hay into more easily transported large square bales that could be stacked and tarped in the field (to protect them from rain) or loaded on trucks or containers for trucking or export. Depending upon the baler, these bales can weigh from 1,000 to 2,200 pounds (450 to 1,000 kg) for a 3 ft × 3 ft × 9 ft (0.91 m × 0.91 m × 2.74 m) or 3 ft × 4 ft × 9 ft (0.91 m × 1.22 m × 2.74 m) bale (versus 900 pounds [410 kg] for a 3-or-4-foot [0.91 or 1.22 m] round bale). As the pickup revolves just above the ground surface, the tines pick up and feed the hay into the flake forming chamber, where a "flake" of hay is formed before being pushed up into the path of the plunger, which then compresses it with great force (200 to 750 kilonewtons or 45,000 to 169,000 pounds-force, depending on model) against the existing bale in the chamber. Once the desired length is achieved, the knotter arm is mechanically tripped to begin the knotting cycle in which several knotters (4–6 is common) tie the 4–6 strings that maintain the bale's shape.

In the prairies of Canada, the large rectangular balers are also called "prairie raptors".

=== Large square bale handling and transport ===
Square bales are easier to transport than round bales, since there is little risk of the bale rolling off the back of a flatbed trailer. The rectangular shape also saves space and allows a complete solid slab of hay to be stacked for transport and storage. Most balers allow adjustment of length and it is common to produce bales of twice the width, allowing stacks with brick-like alternating groups overlapping the row below at right angles, creating a strong structure.

They are well-suited for large-scale livestock feedlot or dairy operations, where many tons of feed are rationed every hour.

Due to the huge rectangular shape, large spear forks, or squeeze grips, are mounted to heavy lifting machinery, such as large forklifts, tractors equipped with front-end loaders, telehandlers, hay squeezes or wheel loaders to lift these bales.

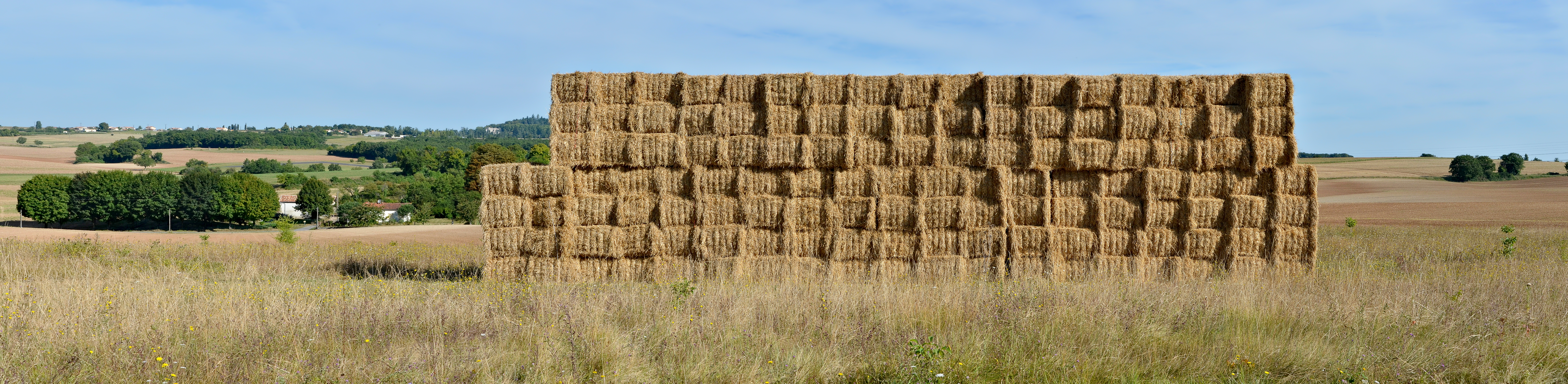
Large rectangular bales in a field, Charente, France. Sizes of stacks of baled hay need to be carefully managed, as the curing process is exothermic and the built-up heat around internal bales can reach ignition temperatures in the right weather history and atmospheric conditions. Building a deep stack either too wide or too high increases the risk of spontaneous ignition.

== Small square baler ==
Video of baling with a kick baler, and unloading into a barn with a hay elevator (See file description for links to larger and higher-quality videos.)

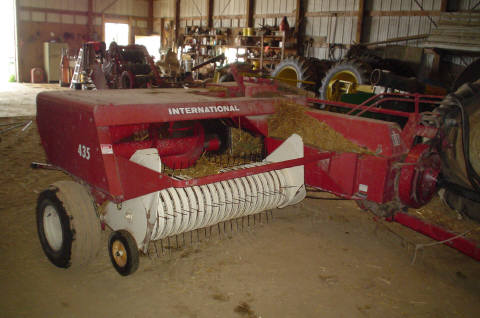
A small square baler (International model 435)

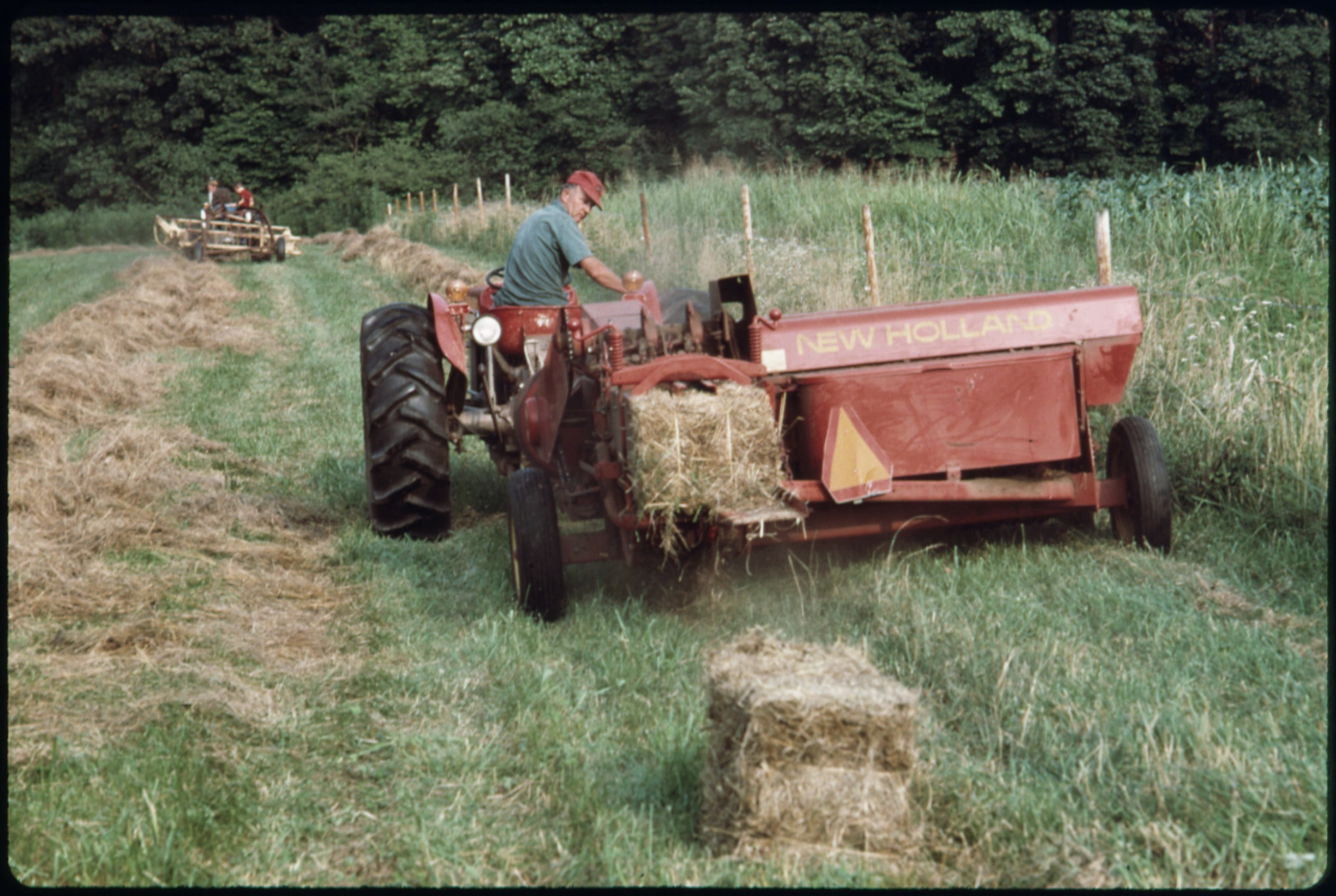
Square baling, 1975

The original type of baler produces small square bales. These bales are rectangular-shaped "square" bales. This was once the most prevalent form of baler but is less common today. It is primarily used on small acreages where large equipment is impractical and hay production for small operations, particularly horse owners who may not have access to the specialized feeding machinery used for larger bales. Each bale is about 14 by 18 by 34–40 inches (36 cm × 46 cm × 86 cm–102 cm). The bales are usually wrapped with two, sometimes three, or more strands of knotted twine. The bales are light enough for one person to handle, about 45 to 60 pounds (20 to 27 kg), depending upon the crop and pressure applied (can be 100 lbs for a 16"x18" 2-string bale and even more for a 3-string bale). Many balers have adjustable bale chamber pressure and bale length, so shorter, less-dense bales can be produced for easy handling.

To form the bale, the material to be baled (which is often hay or straw) in the windrow is lifted by tines in the baler's reel. This material is then packed into the bale chamber, which runs the length of one side of the baler (usually the left-hand side when viewed from the rear) in offset balers. Balers like Hesston models use an in-line system where the hay goes straight through from the pickup to the flake chamber to the plunger and bale-forming chamber. A combination plunger and knife move back and forth in the front of this chamber, with the knife closing the door into the bale chamber as it moves backward. The plunger and knife are attached to a heavy asymmetrical flywheel to provide extra force as they pack the bales. A measuring device – , typically a spiked wheel that is turned by the emerging bales – measures the amount of material that is being compressed and, at the appropriate length, it triggers the knotters that wrap the twine around the bale and tie it off. As the next bale is formed, the tied one is driven out of the rear of the baling chamber, where it can either drop to the ground or be sent to a wagon or accumulator towed behind the baler.

When a wagon is used, the bale may be lifted by hand from the chamber by a worker on the wagon who stacks the bales on the wagon, or the bale may be propelled into the wagon by a mechanism on the baler, commonly either a "thrower" (parallel high-speed drive belts which throw the bale into the wagon) or a "kicker" (mechanical arm which throws the bale into the wagon). In the case of a thrower or kicker, the wagon has high walls on the left, right, and back sides and a short wall on the front side to contain the randomly piled bales. This process continues as long as the material is in the bale chamber and there is twine to tie the bales.

This form of bale is not used much in large-scale commercial agriculture because the efficiency and speed of large bales are higher. However, it has some popularity in small-scale, low-mechanization agriculture and horse-keeping. Besides using simpler machinery and being easy to handle, these small bales can also be used for insulation and building materials in straw-bale construction. Convenience is also a significant factor in farmers deciding to continue putting up square bales, as they make feeding and bedding in confined areas (stables, barns, etc.) much more manageable and thus command a higher market value per ton.

The automatic baler for small square bales took on most of its present form in 1938, with the first baler sold as Arthur S. Young's Automaton Baler. It was manufactured in small numbers until New Holland Ag acquired it.

In Europe, as early as 1939, both Claas of Germany and Rousseau SA of France had automatic twine-tying pick-up balers. Most of these produced low-density bales, however. The first successful pick-up balers were made by the Ann Arbor Company in 1929. Ann Arbor was acquired by the Oliver Farm Equipment Company in 1943. Despite their head start on the rest of the field, no Ann Arbor balers carried automatic knotters or twisters and Oliver did not produce its own automatic tying baler until 1949.

=== Small square bale handling and transport ===
In the 1940s most farmers would bale hay in the field with a small tractor with 20 or less horsepower, and the tied bales would be dropped onto the ground as the baler moved through the field. Another team of workers with horses and a flatbed wagon would come by and use a sharp metal hook to grab the bale and throw it up onto the wagon while an assistant stacked the bales, for transport to the barn.

A later time-saving innovation was to tow the flatbed wagon directly behind the baler. The bale would be pushed up a ramp to a waiting attendant on the wagon. The attendant would hook the bale off the ramp and stack it on the wagon while waiting for the next bale to be produced.

Eventually, as balers evolved, the bale thrower was developed, eliminating needing someone to stand on the wagon and pick up the finished bales. The first thrower mechanism used two fast-moving friction belts to grab finished bales and throw them at an angle up in the air onto the bale wagon. The bale wagon was modified from a flatbed into a three-sided skeleton frame open at the front to act as a catcher's net for the thrown bales.

As tractor horsepower increased, the thrower-baler's next innovation was the hydraulic tossing baler. This employs a flat pan behind the bale knotter. As bales advance out the back of the baler, they are pushed onto the pan one at a time. When the bale has moved entirely onto the pan, the pan suddenly pops up, pushed by a large hydraulic cylinder, and tosses the bale up into the wagon like a catapult.

The pan-thrower method puts much less stress on the bales than the belt-thrower. The friction belts of the belt-thrower stress the twine and knots as they grip the bale and occasionally cause bales to break apart in the thrower or when the bales land in the wagon.

=== Mechanical small square bale handling ===
There are several ways to handle small bales automatically and eliminate hand labor almost completely. Bale stackers, bale bundlers, bale accumulators, and bale sledges are the different categories of these machines.

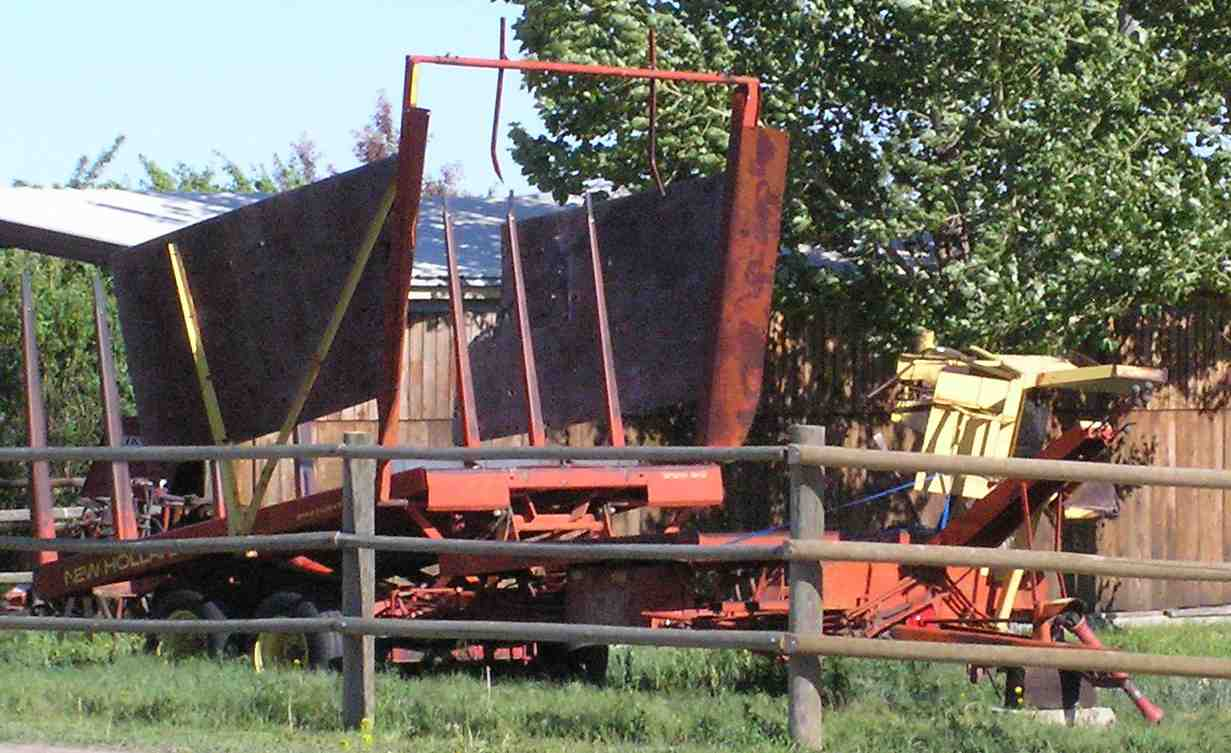
Square bale stacker

Bale stacker: Bales may be picked up from the field and stacked using a self-powered machine called a bale stacker, bale wagon or harobed. There are several designs and sizes made by New Holland. One type picks up square bales, which are dropped by the baler with the strings facing sideways. The stacker will drive up to each bale, pick it up, and set it on a three-bale-wide table (the strings are now facing upwards). Once three bales are on the table, the table lifts up and back, causing the three bales to face strings to the side again; this happens three more times until there are 16 bales on the main table. This table will lift like the smaller one, and the bales will be up against a vertical table. The machine will hold 160 bales (ten tiers); usually, there will be cross-tiers near the center to keep the stack from swaying or collapsing if any weight is applied to the top of the stack. The full load will be transported to a barn; the whole rear of the stacker will tilt upwards until it is vertical. There will be two pushers that will extend through the machine and hold the bottom of the stack from being pulled out from the stacker while it is driven out of the barn.

Bale bundler: Bales may be picked up from the field or collected directly from the small square baler. Each bale is ingested into a compression chamber and indexed until either two or three are ready for compression. After 7 compression cycles are completed, making a cube of 14 or 21 bales they are tied with twine or banded into a bundle and ejected onto the ground. These bundles are then handled with spears, grabs, or pallet forks. They are of ideal dimensions for filling van trailers.

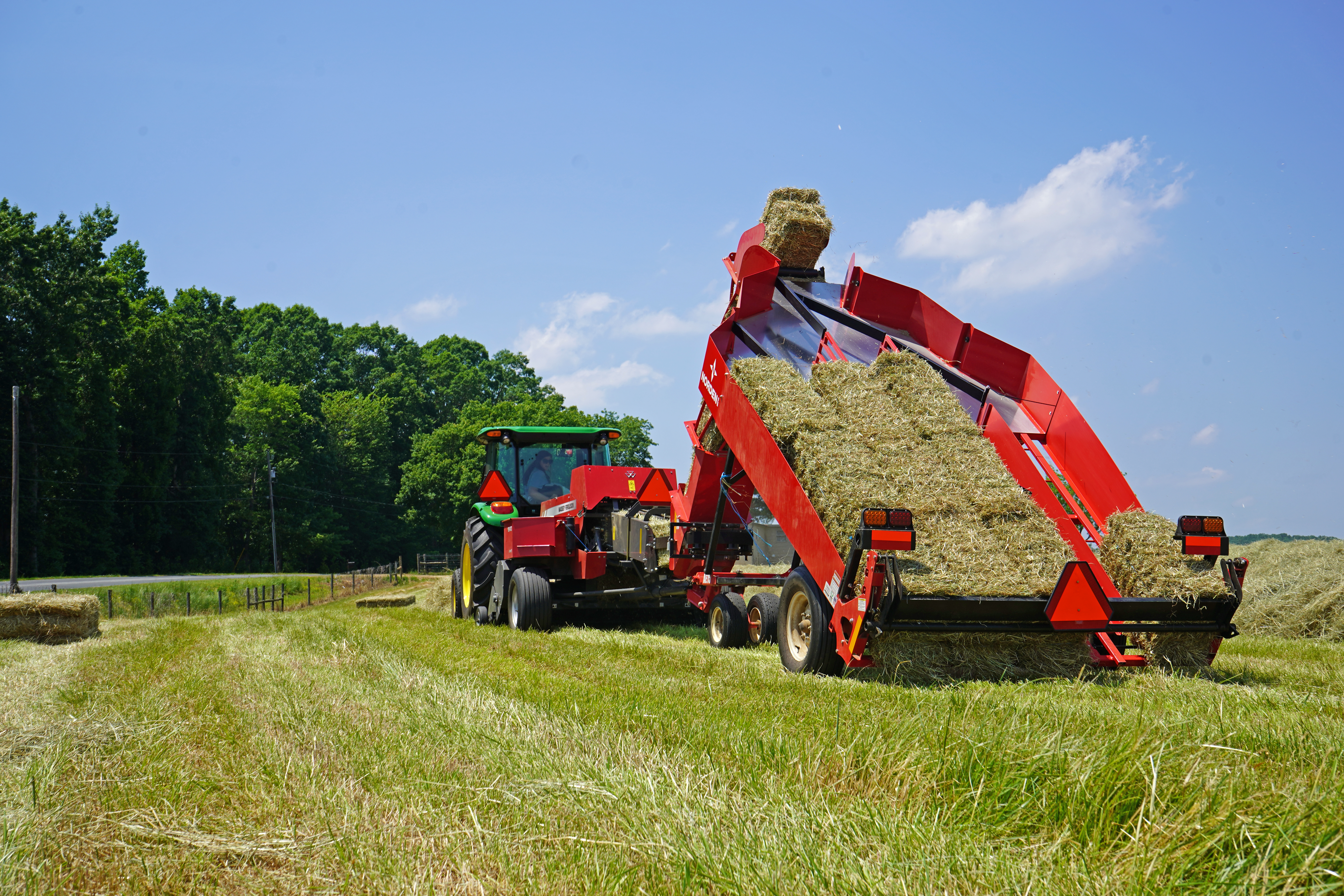
Bale accumulator

Bale accumulator: Typically these are attached directly to the baler and arrange the small square bales into groups to be retrieved with a "bale grabber" or "bale grab" mounted on a loader. There are a number of different methods employed by these machines to arrange the bales into groups. One method is to allow up to three bales to be pushed in line onto a tray that is then emptied sideways by a hydraulically driven push bar onto a platform. After four or five such pushes, a group is made of 8, 10 12, or 15 bales and the platform is emptied onto the ground.

Another, more efficient method, that doesn't use hydraulics, is to use a system of levers and gates to guide bales into channels. These can have four, five, or six channels and accommodate two or three bales per channel. This method can make groups of 4, 8, 10, 12, 15 or 18 bales. In this method, the last bale of the group triggers a rear gate open, and the bales are deposited on the ground.

These groups can be bound with twine for stack stability or not and be stacked on wagons or trailers for transport to storage. These groups are ideal for storage in buildings accessible to equipment. This is also the ideal way to automate bales and also allow them to cure properly.

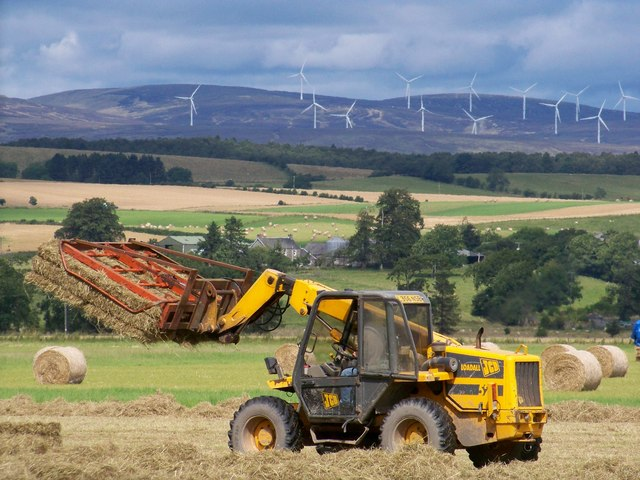
A smaller type of stacker or bale grab

Bale sledge: In Britain (if small square bales are still to be used), they are usually collected as they fall out of the baler in a bale sledge dragged behind the baler. This has four channels, controlled by automatic mechanical balances, catches, and springs, which sort each bale into its place in a square eight. When the sledge is full, a catch is tripped automatically, and a door at the rear opens to leave the eight lying neatly together on the ground. These may be picked up individually and loaded by hand, or they may be picked up all eight together by a bale grab on a tractor, a special front loader consisting of many hydraulically powered downward-pointing curved spikes. The square eight will then be stacked, either on a trailer for transport or in a roughly cubic field stack eight or ten layers high. This cube may then be transported by a large machine attached to the three-point hitch behind a tractor, which clamps the sides of the cube and lifts it bodily.

== Square/wire bale history ==
=== Hay presses, wire balers ===
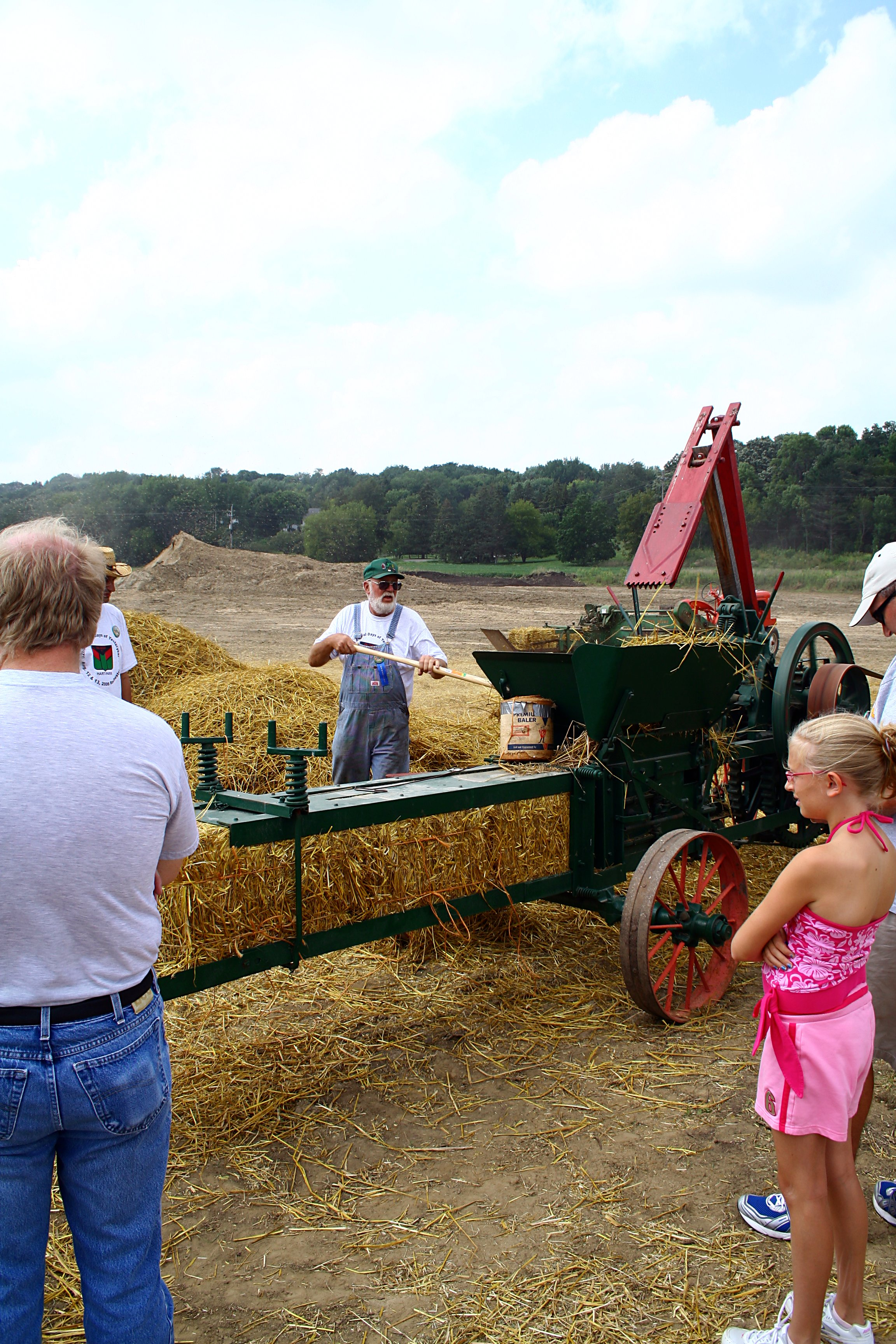
Stationary baler

Prior to 1937, the hay press was the common name of the stationary baling implement, powered with a tractor or stationary engine using a belt on a belt pulley, with the hay being brought to the baler and fed in by hand. Later, balers were made mobile, with a 'pickup' to gather up the hay and feed it into the chamber. These often used air-cooled gasoline engines mounted on the baler for power. The biggest change to this type of baler since 1940 is being powered by the tractor through its power take-off (PTO), instead of by a built-in internal combustion engine.

In present-day production, small square balers can be ordered with twine knotters or wire tie knotters.

Not all stationary wire-tying balers used two wires. It was not uncommon for the larger bale size – usually 17 in × 22 in (43 cm × 56 cm) – machines to use 'boards' that had three slots for wires and hence tied three wires per bale. Most North American manufacturers produced these machines as either regular models or as size options. 'Small square' three wire tying pick-up balers were available from the early 1930s, principally from J. I. Case & Co. and Ann Arbor. These machines were hand-tying and hand-threading machines.

=== Storage methods ===
Before electrification occurred in rural parts of the United States in the 1940s, some small dairy farms would have tractors but not electric power. Often just one neighbor who could afford a tractor would do all the baling for surrounding farmers still using horses.

To get the bales up into the hayloft, a pulley system ran on a track along the peak of the barn's hayloft. This track also stuck a few feet out the end of the loft, with a large access door under the track. On the bottom of the pulley system was a bale spear, which was pointed on the end and had retractable retention spikes.

A flatbed wagon would pull up next to the barn underneath the end of the track, the spear lowered down to the wagon and speared into a single bale. Another method used a hay harpoon, and there was also a hay grapple. These were capable of carrying up to 12 bales at a time. The pulley rope would be used to manually lift the bale up until it could enter the mow through the door, then moved along the track into the barn and finally released for manual stacking in tight rows across the floor of the loft. As the stack filled the loft, the bales would be lifted higher and higher with the pulleys until the hay was stacked all the way up to the peak.

When electricity arrived, the bale spear, pulley, and track system were replaced by long motorized bale conveyors known as hay elevators. A typical elevator is an open skeletal frame, with a chain that has dull 3-inch (76 mm) spikes every few feet along the chain to grab bales and drag them along. One elevator replaced the spear track and ran the entire length of the peak of the barn. A second elevator was either installed at a 30-degree slope on the side of the barn to lift bales up to the peak elevator or used dual front-back chains surrounding the bale to lift bales straight up the side of the barn to the peak elevator.

A bale wagon pulled up next to the lifting elevator, and a farm worker placed bales one at a time onto the angled track. Once bales arrived at the peak elevator, adjustable tipping gates along the length of the peak elevator were opened by pulling a cable from the floor of the hayloft, so that bales tipped off the elevator and dropped down to the floor in different areas of the loft. This permitted a single elevator to transport hay to one part of a loft and straw to another part.

This complete hay elevator lifting, transport, and dropping system reduced bale storage labor to a single person, who simply pulls up with a wagon, turns on the elevators, and starts placing bales on it, occasionally checking to make sure that bales are falling in the right locations in the loft.

The neat stacking of bales in the loft is often sacrificed for the speed of just letting them fall and roll down the growing pile in the loft, and changing the elevator gates to fill in open areas around the loose pile. But if desired, the loose bale pile dropped by the elevator could be rearranged into orderly rows between wagon loads.

=== Usage once in the barn ===
The process of retrieving bales from a hayloft has stayed relatively unchanged from the beginning of baling. Typically workers were sent up into the loft, to climb up onto the bale stack, pull bales off the stack, and throw or roll them down the stack to the open floor of the loft. Once the bale is down on the floor, workers climb down the stack, open a cover over a bale chute in the floor of the loft, and push the bales down the chute to the livestock area of the barn.

Most barns were equipped with several chutes along the sides and in the center of the loft floor. This permitted bales to be dropped into the area where they were to be used. Hay bales would be dropped through side chutes, to be broken up and fed to the cattle. Straw bales would be dropped down the center chute, to be distributed as bedding in the livestock standing/resting areas.

Traditionally multiple bales were dropped down to the livestock floor and the twine was removed by hand. After drying and being stored under tons of pressure in the haystack, most bales are tightly compacted and need to be torn apart and fluffed up for use.

One recent method of speeding up all this manual bale handling is the bale shredder, which is a large vertical drum with rotary cutting/ripping teeth at the base of the drum. The shredder is placed under the chute and several bales are dropped in. A worker then pushes the shredder along the barn aisle as it rips up a bale and spews it out in a continuous fluffy stream of material.

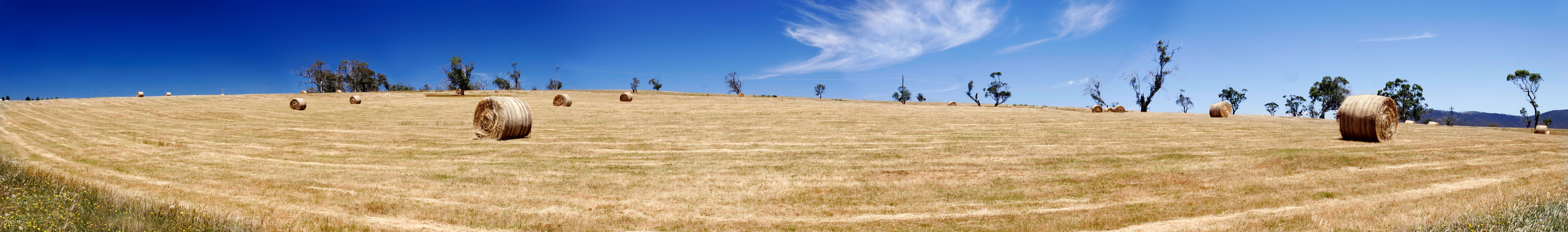
Field of hay bales, lines in field made by baler

== Industrial balers ==
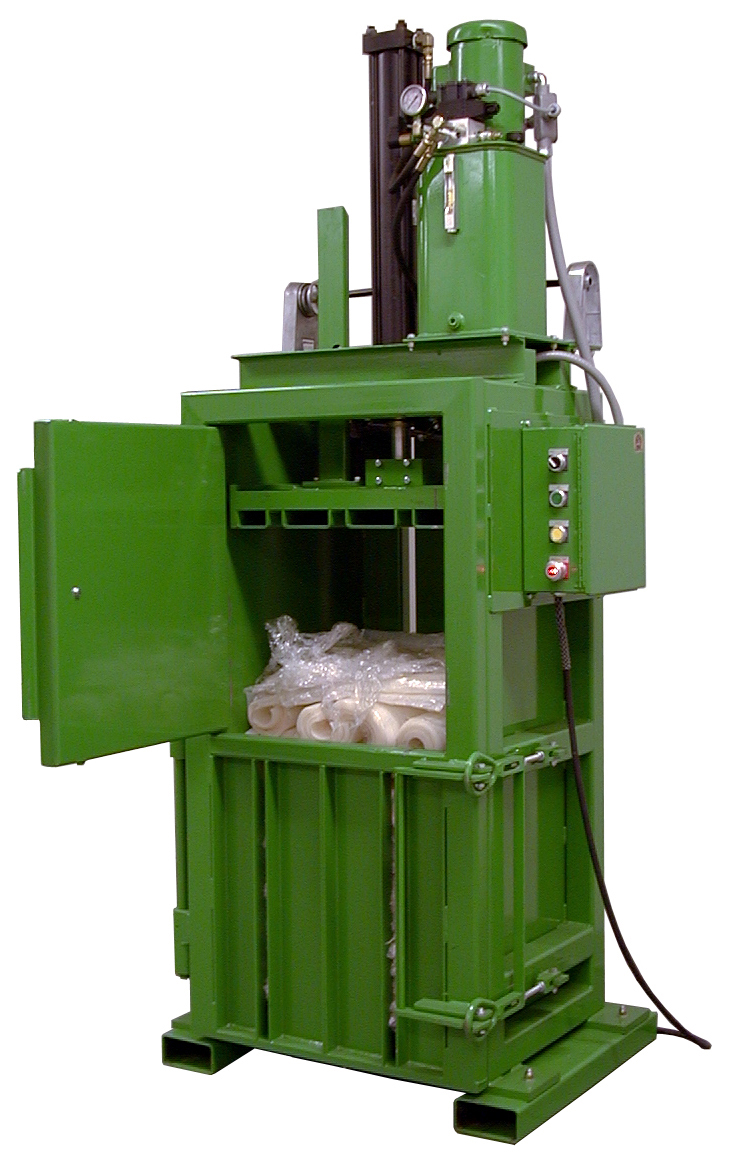
A specialized baler designed to compact stretch wrap

Industrial balers are typically used to compact similar types of waste, such as office paper, cardboard, plastic, foil, and cans, for sale to recycling companies. These balers are made of steel with a hydraulic ram to compress the material loaded. Some balers are simple and labor-intensive but are suitable for smaller volumes. Other balers are very complex and automated and are used where large quantities of waste are handled.

Used in recycling facilities, balers are a packaging step that allows for the aforementioned commodities to be broken down into dense cubes of one type of material at a time. There are different balers used depending on the material type. After a specific material is crushed down into a dense cube, it is tied to a bale by a thick wire and then pushed out of the machine. This process allows for easy transport of all materials involved.

Two-ram baler: A two-ram baler is a baling machine that contains two cylinders and is able to bundle and package most commodities except for cardboard and clear film. This baler is known for its durability and is able to take in more bulky material.

Single-ram baler: A single-ram baler is a baling machine that contains one cylinder. Because this baler is relatively smaller than the two-ram baler, it is best for small and medium commodities.

Closed door baler: This baler bales clear plastic film.

American baler: This baler bales corrugated materials.

== See also ==
- Aluminium recycling
- Beaverslide
- Compactor
- Farm wagon
- Glass recycling
- Hay
- Hay rake
- List of farm implements
- Paper recycling
- Paper shredder
- Plastic recycling
- Straw bale
- Tedder
- Trolley
- Windrow
