= Acroceras macrum =

Nile grass

Scientific classification
- Kingdom: Plantae
- Clade: Tracheophytes
- Clade: Angiosperms
- Clade: Monocots
- Clade: Commelinids
- Order: Poales
- Family: Poaceae
- Subfamily: Panicoideae
- Genus: Acroceras
- Species: A. macrum

Binomial name
- Acroceras macrum Stapf

Synonyms
- Neohusnotia macra (Stapf) C.C. Hsu; Panicum gimmae Fiori

Species of plant

Acroceras macrum (Nile grass, Nyl grass) is a species of perennial grass. The whole plant grows to 20–70 centimetres (8–27 1/2 in) tall. The roots are extended rhizomes and the bright green, lanceolate leaves are typically 8–20 cm long. it produces spiked inflorescences 2–8 cm long. It produces seeds but is usually propagated using cuttings of the rhizomes.

The species is native to Africa grows well in flooded, moist, and humid conditions and does not do well in periods of drought. Thus, it is often found on streamsides, pond margins, and in swampy places; it prefers acidic soils. It is susceptible to leaf spot caused by Phyllosticta and smut caused by Ustilago syntherismae. It has been studied in breeding programs and it has been introduced to Australia and South America for cultivation. It is grown extensively as pasture, silage, and hay. It is palatable and nutritious for animal feed.
