= Jenipapucu River =

River in Marajó, Brazil

- Location within Brazil

Location
- Country: Brazil
- State: Pará

Physical characteristics
- Mouth
  - location: Lake Arari
  - coordinates: 0°34′55″S 49°07′40″W

The Jenipapucu River (Portuguese: Rio Jenipapucu) is a river of Marajó, which itself is an island in the Amazon Delta. It is located in the state Pará in northern Brazil.

The Jenipapucu River enters Lake Arari through its northern shore. It flows through the swamp areas called mondongos that are normally flooded during the wet season. It connects to the Tartarugas River through the Tartarugas Canal (Canal Tartarugas), created in the first half of the 20th century to connect Lake Arari to the Atlantic Ocean and to facilitate drainage of the area in times of flooding. The Jenipapucu River is often clogged by German grass and water hyacinths, making the passage of boats difficult.

Along the Jenipapucu was a large fazenda owned by the Jesuits that employed slave labour.

== See also ==
- List of rivers of Pará
