= Acroceras elegans =

Scientific classification
- Kingdom: Plantae
- Clade: Tracheophytes
- Clade: Angiosperms
- Clade: Monocots
- Clade: Commelinids
- Order: Poales
- Family: Poaceae
- Subfamily: Panicoideae
- Genus: Acroceras
- Species: A. elegans

Binomial name
- Acroceras elegans A. Camus, 1955

Synonyms
- Panicum elegans Cordem.

Species of grass

Acroceras elegans is a species of plant in the grass family. It is found in Madagascar and Réunion.
