= Grain crimping =

Preservation method for livestock feed

Grain crimping or moist grain crimping is an agricultural technology, an organic way to preserve feed grain into livestock fodder by fermentation.

Crimped grain brings health benefits to the animals and economic benefits such as cost savings and increased meat or milk production to the farmer.

== History ==
Crimping was developed in Finland in the late 1960s by two farmer brothers, Aimo and Gunnar Korte, based on findings of British researchers as early as 1918. The brothers made the first crimper machine for home farm use. As knowledge of the device became widespread, they established a company to manufacture and sell the machines.

British researchers had established that grain attains its peak nutritional value when the moisture content is between 35% and 45%. It took about 50 years before this knowledge was successfully utilized to process and preserve grain when moist.

== Description ==
Traditionally grain is only harvested when it is dry enough to be ground by a hammer mill. Moist grain cannot be ground or stored without machine drying and using preservatives, which increases cost.

In crimping, the grain is combined moist and run through the crimper machine, which will break and flatten the grains. Additives, such as preservatives or molasses and water (if necessary) can be added to ensure the protection of nutrients.

Crimped grain is stored in storage silos as a silage.

Crimped grain is dustless, thus convenient to handle, does not require further processing, and is often preferred by animals over drier and dustier feeds.

Practical experiments by farming and livestock research institutions in Finland, Sweden, UK and elsewhere have confirmed that crimped feed has higher nutritional value, it increases the animals' growth and milk production, improves milk quality and the animals' health and helps cut costs.

An important point is that crimping home-grown grain and processing the feed on the spot at the farm, enables feed ingredients to be controlled and fully traceable. This helps in prevention of diseases, such as BSE.

== See also ==
- Animal husbandry
- Dairy farming
- Harvest
