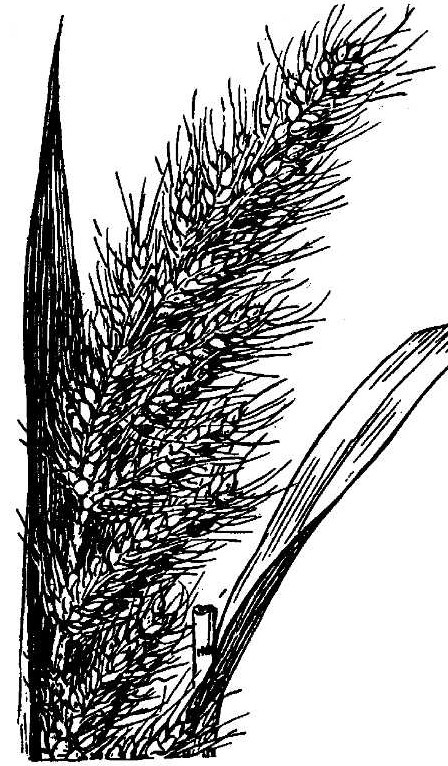

Conservation status
- Least Concern (IUCN 3.1)

Scientific classification
- Kingdom: Plantae
- Clade: Tracheophytes
- Clade: Angiosperms
- Clade: Monocots
- Clade: Commelinids
- Order: Poales
- Family: Poaceae
- Subfamily: Panicoideae
- Genus: Echinochloa
- Species: E. crus-pavonis

Binomial name
- Echinochloa crus-pavonis (Kunth) Schult.

= Echinochloa crus-pavonis =

Species of plant

Echinochloa crus-pavonis is a species of grass known by the common name gulf cockspur grass. It is native to much of the Americas, Africa, and part of Asia, and it is known throughout the world as an introduced species. It is an annual grass often exceeding 1.5 meters in maximum height. The inflorescence is divided into several branches coated in green spikelets.
