= Echinochloa oryzicola =

Scientific classification
- Kingdom: Plantae
- Clade: Tracheophytes
- Clade: Angiosperms
- Clade: Monocots
- Clade: Commelinids
- Order: Poales
- Family: Poaceae
- Subfamily: Panicoideae
- Genus: Echinochloa
- Species: E. oryzicola

Binomial name
- Echinochloa oryzicola (Vasinger) Vasinger

Species of grass

Echinochloa oryzicola, also called late watergrass or echinochloa phyllopogon, is an annual species of monocot grass that grows in temperate climates. It is native to East Asia, and is found in China, Korea, Japan and the Russian Far East near Vladivostok. It has been introduced into Europe, in Belgium, France, Germany, Italy, Portugal and Spain, and also the Transcaucasus. As a weed, some examples in Portugal have developed resistance to Group A and Group B herbicides.
