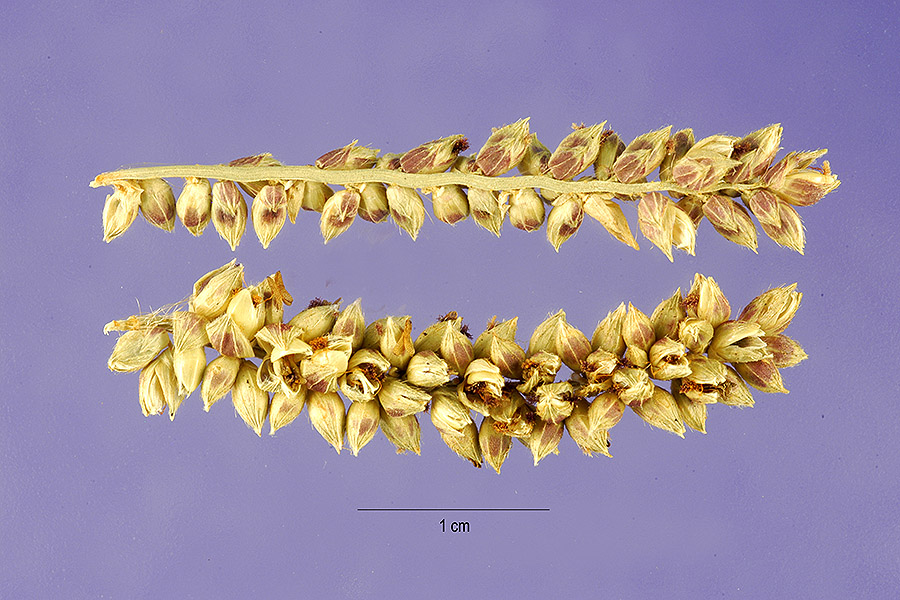
- Antelope grass seeds.

Conservation status
- Least Concern (IUCN 3.1)

Scientific classification
- Kingdom: Plantae
- Clade: Tracheophytes
- Clade: Angiosperms
- Clade: Monocots
- Clade: Commelinids
- Order: Poales
- Family: Poaceae
- Subfamily: Panicoideae
- Genus: Echinochloa
- Species: E. pyramidalis

Binomial name
- Echinochloa pyramidalis (Lam.) Hitchc. and Chase

Synonyms
- Echinochloa holubii (Stapf) Stapf; Panicum holubii Stapf; Panicum pyramidale Lam.; Panicum quadrifarium Hochst. ex A. Rich.

= Echinochloa pyramidalis =

Species of grass, "antelope grass"

Echinochloa pyramidalis is a species of large grass, occurring naturally in flooded regions and beside lakes in tropical Africa and America, and introduced to various other countries. It is commonly known as antelope grass.

== Description ==
Echinochloa pyramidalis is a large, perennial, reed-like grass growing to a height of about 300 cm (10 ft) or even taller. The stems are solid and roots grow from the lower nodes. The leaves are stiff and blade-shaped and up to 60 cm (24 in) long, the ligules of the lower leaves having a fringe of short hairs round the margin which are absent from those of the upper leaves. The leaf sheaths can be either hairy or glabrous (hairless). The inflorescence has a central axis some 15 to 30 cm (6 to 12 in) long, the racemes on either side being up to 8 cm (3 in) long and bearing short-stalked, purplish, acute, awnless spikelets some 3 to 4 mm (0.12 to 0.16 in) long. This is a strong-growing plant with a fasciculated (arranged in bundles) root system and in suitable localities, forms dense stands of even height.

== Distribution and habitat ==
Echinochloa pyramidalis is native to tropical and subtropical Africa. It is found throughout the continent in seasonally inundated grassland, swamps, river and lake edges. It grows well in black clay, and is moderately tolerant of anoxic conditions. It forms a substantial part of the vegetation in the Sudd, the vast swamp in South Sudan through which the White Nile passes. It has been introduced to other areas of the world as a fodder crop and has not in general become naturalised. Its altitudinal range is 300 to 1,500 m (1,000 to 5,000 ft).

== Uses ==
Echinochloa pyramidalis is palatable to livestock and is cultivated for fodder, being able to withstand heavy grazing; it grows during the wet season, dying back to the base during the dry season, but will resprout vigorously after wildfires, even in the middle of the dry season. It can be made into hay, but for this purpose the glabrous varieties are chosen. The grain is sometimes used for human consumption.

This grass can be used to prevent erosion on river banks prone to flooding and on earth dams. It can be used in a similar way to reeds for sewage control. Where it has become invasive, as for example in Mexico and Guyana, it reduces biodiversity and grows so vigorously that it displaces native plants.
