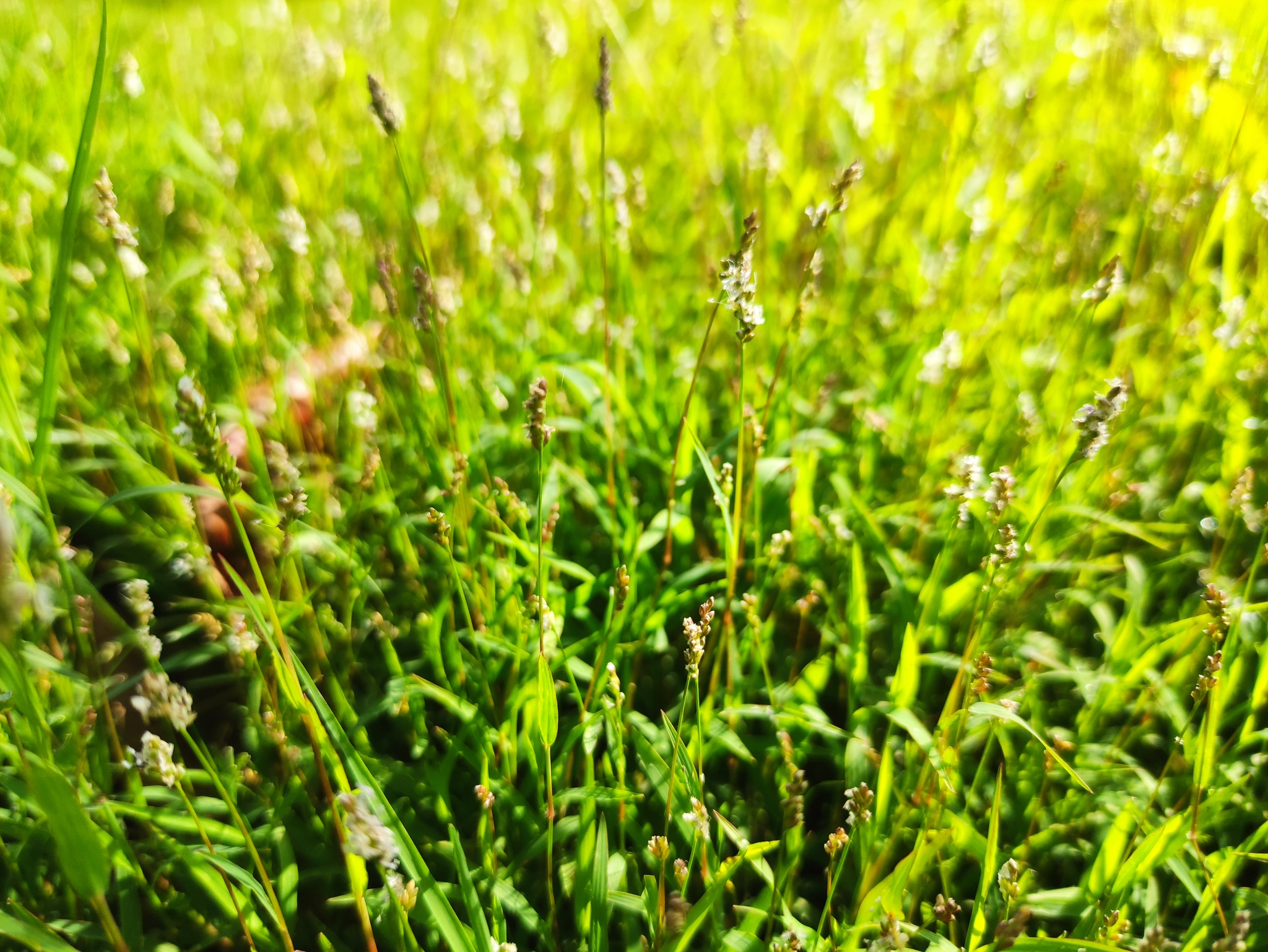
- Acroceras hubbardii

Scientific classification
- Kingdom: Plantae
- Clade: Tracheophytes
- Clade: Angiosperms
- Clade: Monocots
- Clade: Commelinids
- Order: Poales
- Family: Poaceae
- Subfamily: Panicoideae
- Supertribe: Panicodae
- Tribe: Paniceae
- Subtribe: Boivinellinae
- Genus: Acroceras; Stapf

Type species
- Acroceras oryzoides (syn of A. zizanioides) Stapf

Synonyms
- Commelinidium Stapf; Neohusnotia A.Camus; Setiacis S.L.Chen & Y.X.Jin

= Acroceras =

Genus of grasses

Acroceras is a genus of tropical and subtropical plants in the grass family.

The genus is widespread across warmer parts of Asia, Africa, and the Americas, with a high amount of diversity in Madagascar.

Species

- Acroceras amplectens
- Acroceras attenuatum
- Acroceras boivinii
- Acroceras bosseri
- Acroceras calcicola
- Acroceras chaseae
- Acroceras diffusum
- Acroceras elegans
- Acroceras excavatum
- Acroceras fluminense
- Acroceras gabunense
- Acroceras hubbardii
- Acroceras ivohibense
- Acroceras lateriticum
- Acroceras macrum
- Acroceras mandrarense
- Acroceras manongarivense
- Acroceras munroanum
- Acroceras parvulum
- Acroceras paucispicata
- Acroceras sambiranense
- Acroceras seyrigii
- Acroceras tenuicaule
- Acroceras tonkinense
- Acroceras zizanioides

formerly included

see Brachiaria Panicum

- Acroceras paucispicatum - Brachiaria paucispicata
- Acroceras pilgerianum - Panicum pilgerianum

== See also ==
- List of Poaceae genera
