= Oplismenopsis =

Scientific classification
- Kingdom: Plantae
- Clade: Embryophytes
- Clade: Tracheophytes
- Clade: Angiosperms
- Clade: Monocots
- Clade: Commelinids
- Order: Poales
- Family: Poaceae
- Subfamily: Panicoideae
- Supertribe: Andropogonodae
- Tribe: Paspaleae
- Subtribe: Arthropogoninae
- Genus: Oplismenopsis; Parodi
- Species: O. najada

Binomial name
- Oplismenopsis najada (Hack. & Arechav.) Parodi

Synonyms
- Panicum najadum Hack. & Arechav.; Echinochloa najada (Hack. & Arechav.) Parodi; Oplismenus najadus (Hack. & Arechav.) Parodi; Panicum amadryadum Arechav. ex Hicken

Genus of grasses

Oplismenopsis is a genus of South American plants in the grass family. The only known species is Oplismenopsis najada, native to southern Brazil, Uruguay, and northeastern Argentina.
