= Bale wrapper =

Agricultural machinery

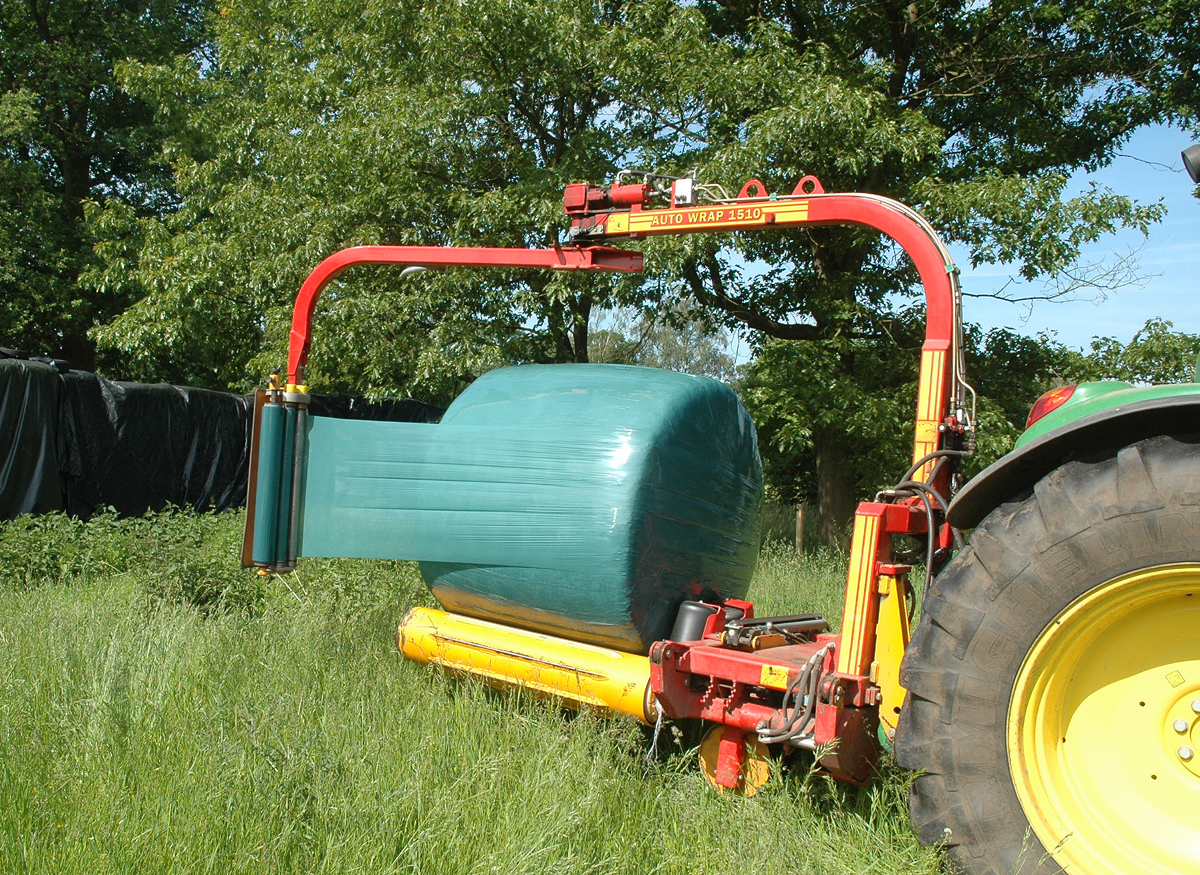
Self Loading Satellite Bale Wrapper

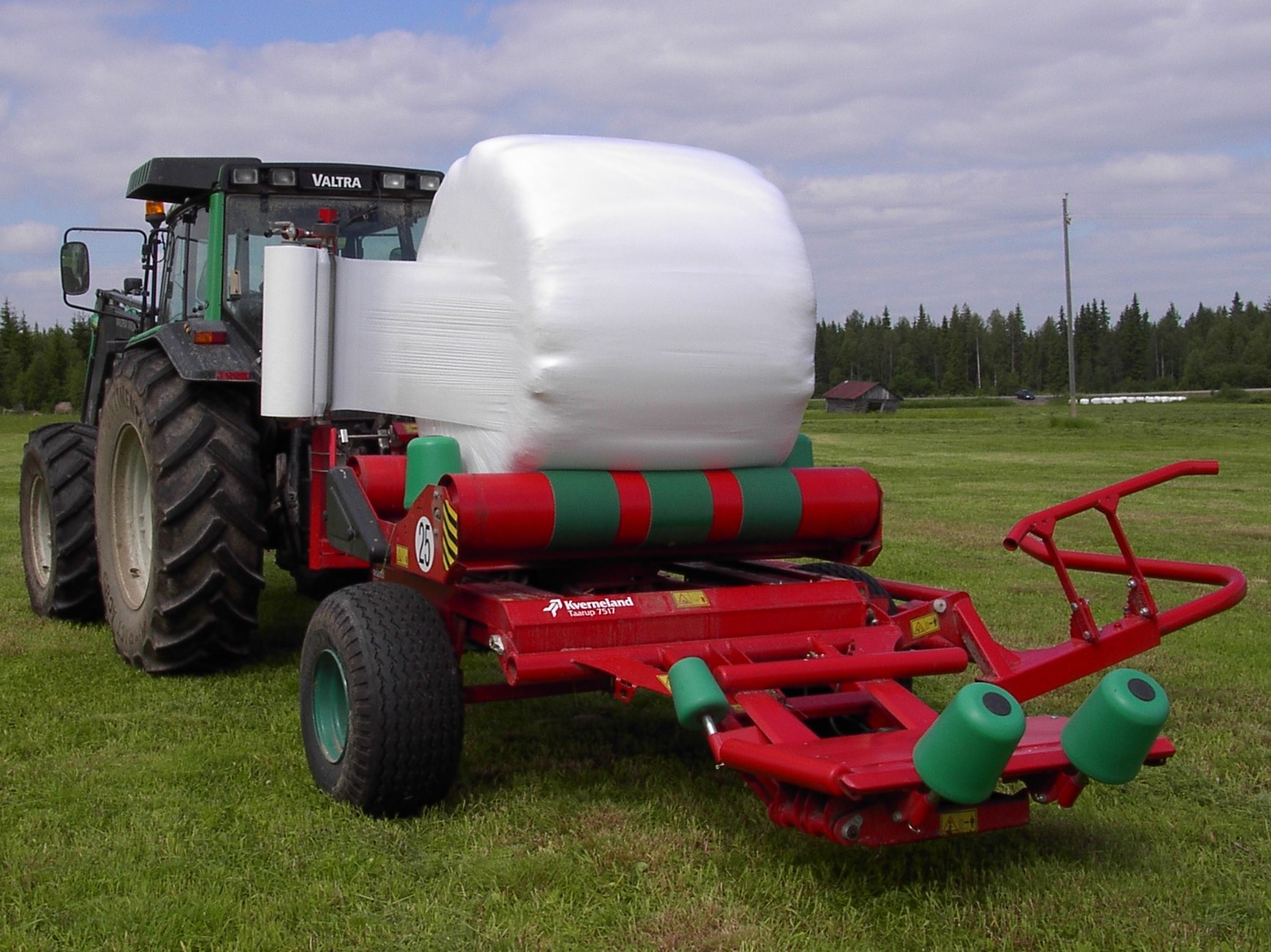
A pulled self-loading bale wrapper.

A bale wrapper is a farm implement for wrapping bales in plastic, for them to turn into silage.

Bale wrappers come in three main forms - turntable type, satellite type and in-line type.

== Satellite bale wrapper ==
A satellite bale wrapper usually consists of hydraulic driven bale supporting rollers and a hydraulic driven rotating satellite arm which carries the plastic film roll and dispensing unit. The rotation of the support rollers and the satellite arm are synchronized so that an even cover of plastic film is applied to the bale as the wrapping process takes place. High speed satellite wrappers have two rotating satellite arms which effectively halves the time taken to wrap a bale.

== Turntable bale wrapper ==
The wrapper has a loading arm, much like a bale handler, at the side, that scoops up a bale and places it on the wrapping table. The wrapping table usually consists of two rollers, and four belts which slowly spin the bales while the table itself revolves. As the bale turns, plastic film is pulled through the dispensing unit and wrapped tightly on the bale. When the table has revolved at least 16 times, the bale can be ejected. This is done by a hydraulic ram which tilts the wrapping table, so that the bale can be tipped off. The film is cut and then tied to the wrapper for the next bale. All this is controlled via a computer inside the cab of the tractor.

== In-line bale wrapper ==
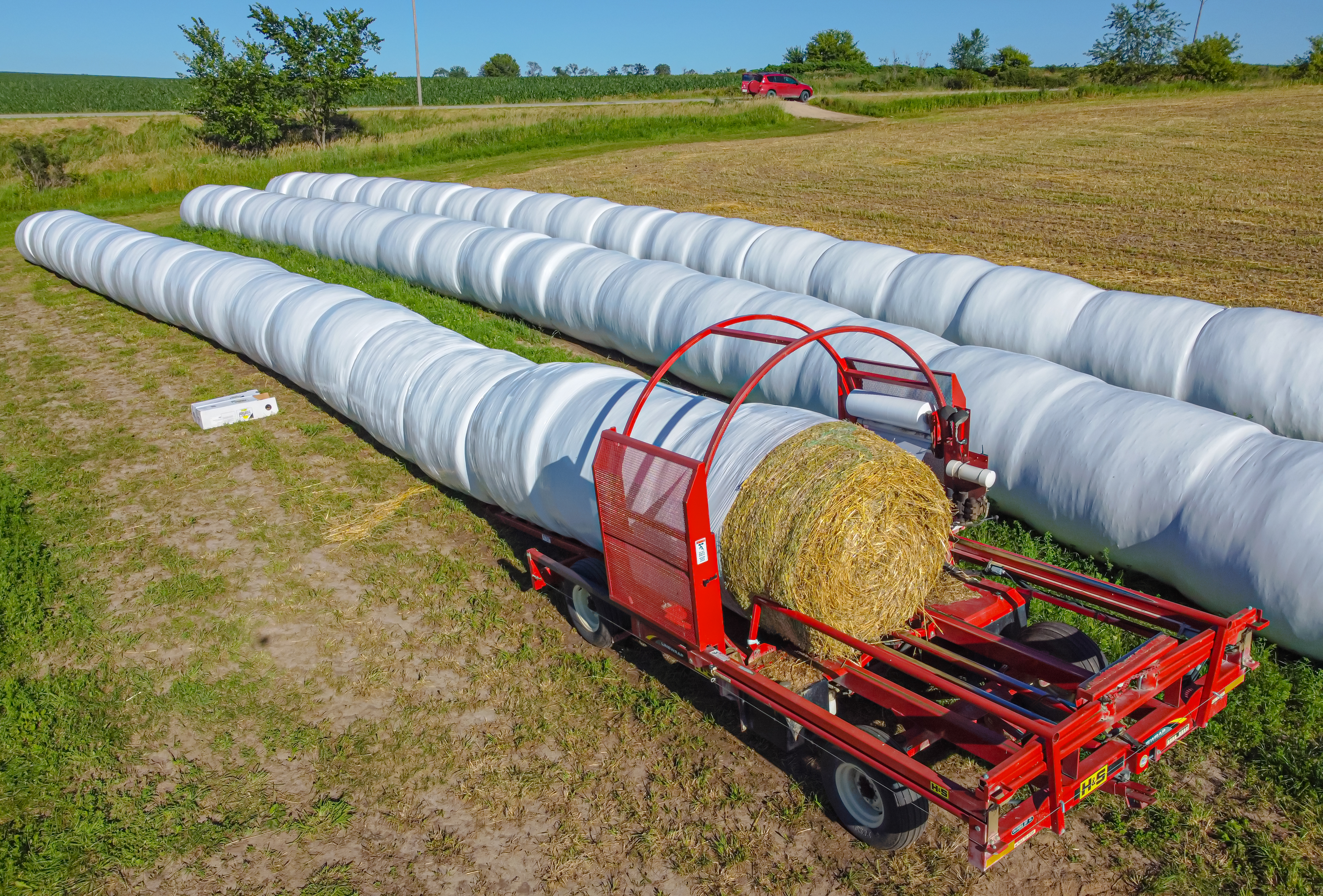
In-line bale wrapper

Best suited for high volume producers the in-line wrapper places bales in neat rows along fields and yards. The bale is placed on the wrappers saddle or table and is driven forward by a push ram allowing the producers to consecutively wrap each bale into one long tube. This also allows for producers to save time and money in the process, by eliminating the need for an extra working hand and save on plastic wrap costs.
