= Echinochloa polystachya =

Conservation status
- Least Concern (IUCN 3.1)

Scientific classification
- Kingdom: Plantae
- Clade: Tracheophytes
- Clade: Angiosperms
- Clade: Monocots
- Clade: Commelinids
- Order: Poales
- Family: Poaceae
- Subfamily: Panicoideae
- Genus: Echinochloa
- Species: E. polystachya

Binomial name
- Echinochloa polystachya (Kunth) Hitchc.

Synonyms
- List: Echinochloa polystachya var. spectabilis (Nees ex Trin.) Mart.Crov.; Oplismenus polystachyus Kunth; Oplismenus spectabilis (Nees ex Trin.) Kunth; Orthopogon hirsutus Spreng. ex Steud.; Panicum bonplandianum Steud.; Panicum phyllanthum Steud.; Panicum polystachyum (Kunth) Steud.; Panicum spectabile Nees ex Trin.; Pseudechinolaena spectabilis (Nees ex Trin.) Herter

Species of grass

Echinochloa polystachya, the German grass, is a species of grass (family Poaceae), native to the New World Tropics and Subtropics, from Texas and Florida down to Argentina. It is an aquatic or semi-aquatic perennial that can grow in water as deep as 2 m (7 ft). It is a useful fodder for water buffaloes, and to a lesser extent, cattle. In the Amazon floodplain it can reach productivity levels of 99.6 t/ha (39.7 long ton/acre; 44.4 short ton/acre) in dry mass, one of the highest levels ever measured in natural vegetation and belongs to the C4 plants . Given that it occupies about 200,000 km^{2} (77,000 mi^{2}) of territory during the rainy season, it contributes on the order of 1% of the primary productivity of the planet.
