= Silage =

Fermented fodder preserved by acidification

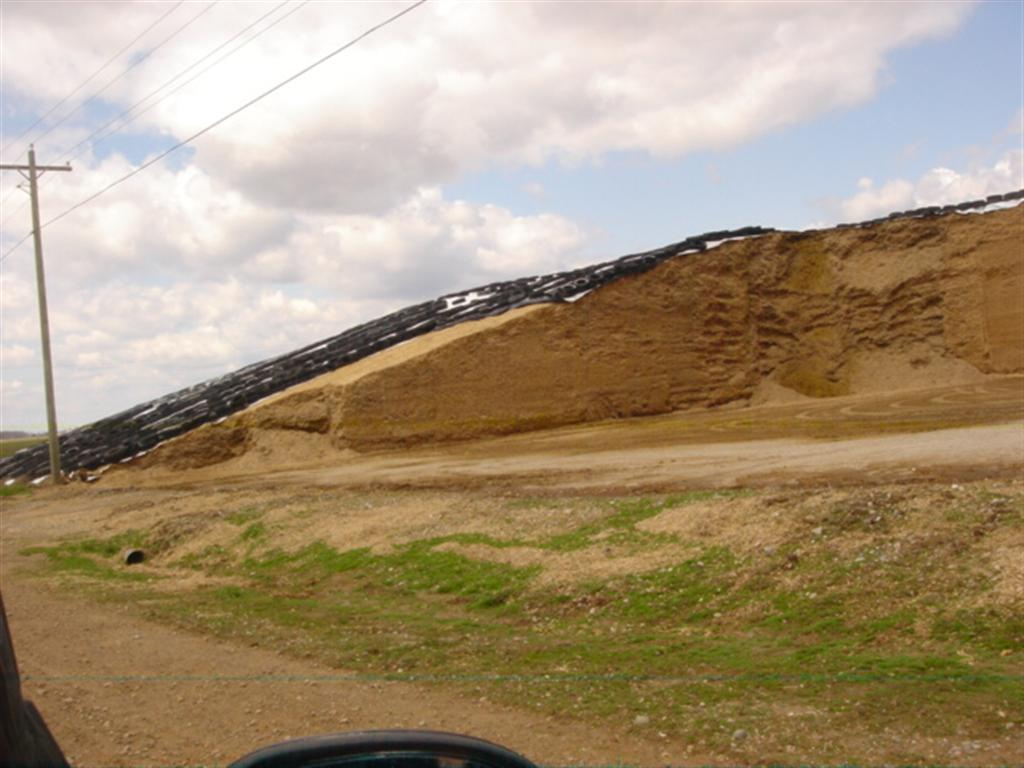
Silage underneath plastic sheeting is held down by scrap tires. Concrete beneath the silage prevents fermented juice from leaching out.

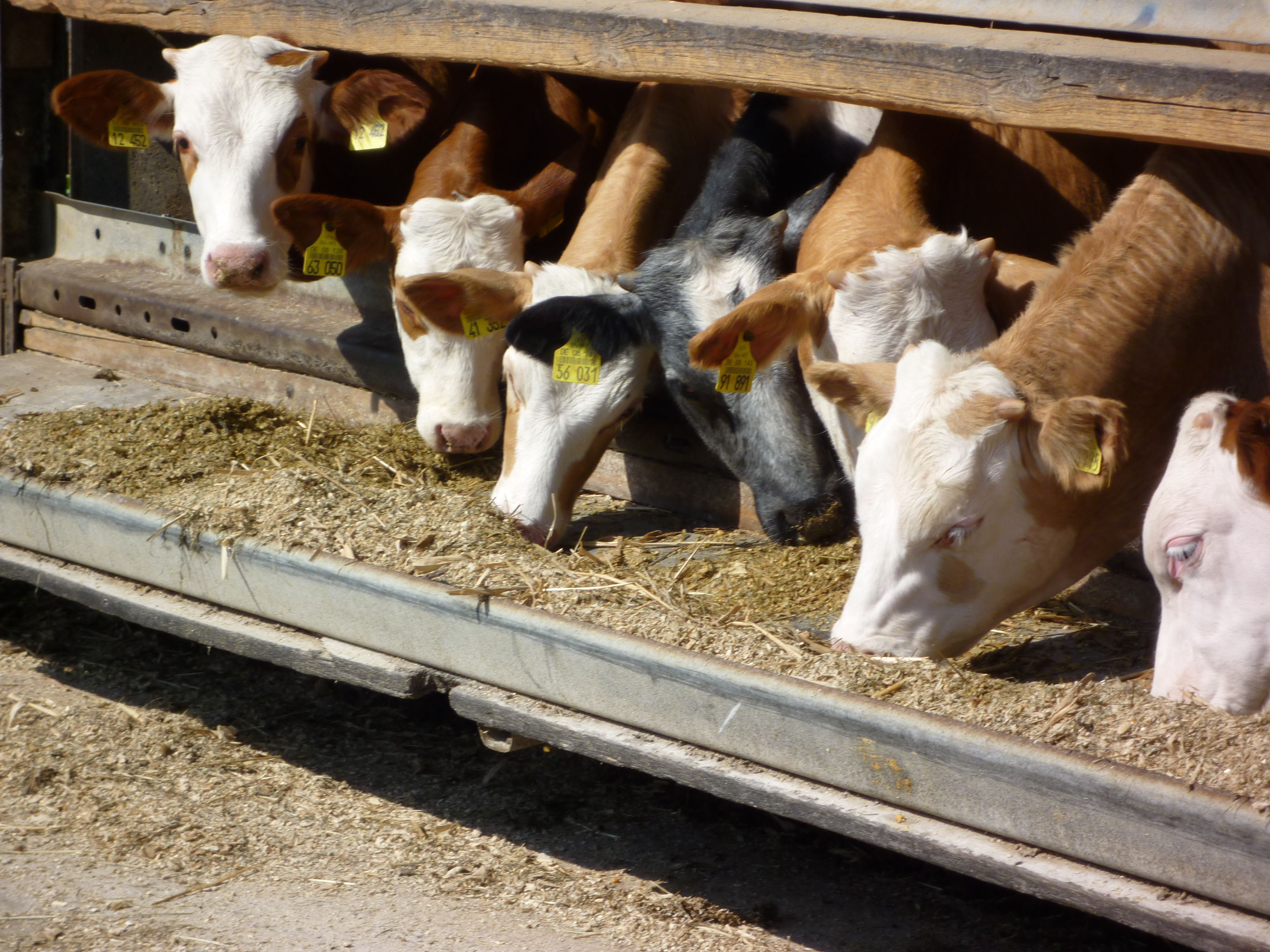
Cattle eating silage

Silage is fodder made from green foliage crops which have been preserved by fermentation to the point of souring. It is fed to cattle, sheep, and other ruminants. The fermentation and storage process is called ensilage, ensiling, or silaging. The exact methods vary, depending on available technology, local tradition, and prevailing climate.

Silage is usually made from grass crops including maize, rye, sorghum, or other cereals, using the entire green plant (not just the grain). Specific terms may be used for silage made from particular crops, such as oatlage for oats and haylage for alfalfa (haylage may also refer to high dry-matter silage made from hay).

== History ==
Using the same technique as the process for making sauerkraut, green fodder has been preserved for animals in parts of Germany since the start of the 19th century. This practice gained the attention of French agriculturist Auguste Goffart of Sologne, near Orléans. He published a book in 1877 which described the experiences of preserving green crops in silos. Goffart's experience attracted considerable attention. The conditions of dairy farming in the United States suited the ensiling of green maize fodder, and was soon adopted by New England farmers. Francis Morris of Maryland prepared the first silage produced in America in 1876. The favourable results obtained in the US led to the introduction of the system in the United Kingdom, where Thomas Kirby first introduced the process for British dairy herds.

Modern silage preserved with acid and prevented from contact with air was invented by Finnish academic and professor of chemistry Artturi Ilmari Virtanen. Virtanen was awarded the 1945 Nobel prize in chemistry "for his research and inventions in agricultural and nutrition chemistry, especially for his fodder preservation method", practically inventing modern silage.

Early silos were made of stone or concrete either above or below ground, but it is recognized that air may be sufficiently excluded in a tightly pressed stack, though in this case a few inches of the fodder around the sides is generally useless owing to mildew. In the US, structures were typically constructed of wooden cylinders 35 to 40 feet (11 to 12 m) in depth.

In the early days of mechanized agriculture (late 1800s), stalks were cut and collected manually using a knife and horsedrawn wagon, and fed into a stationary machine called a "silo filler" that chopped the stalks and blew them up a narrow tube to the top of a tower silo.

== Production ==
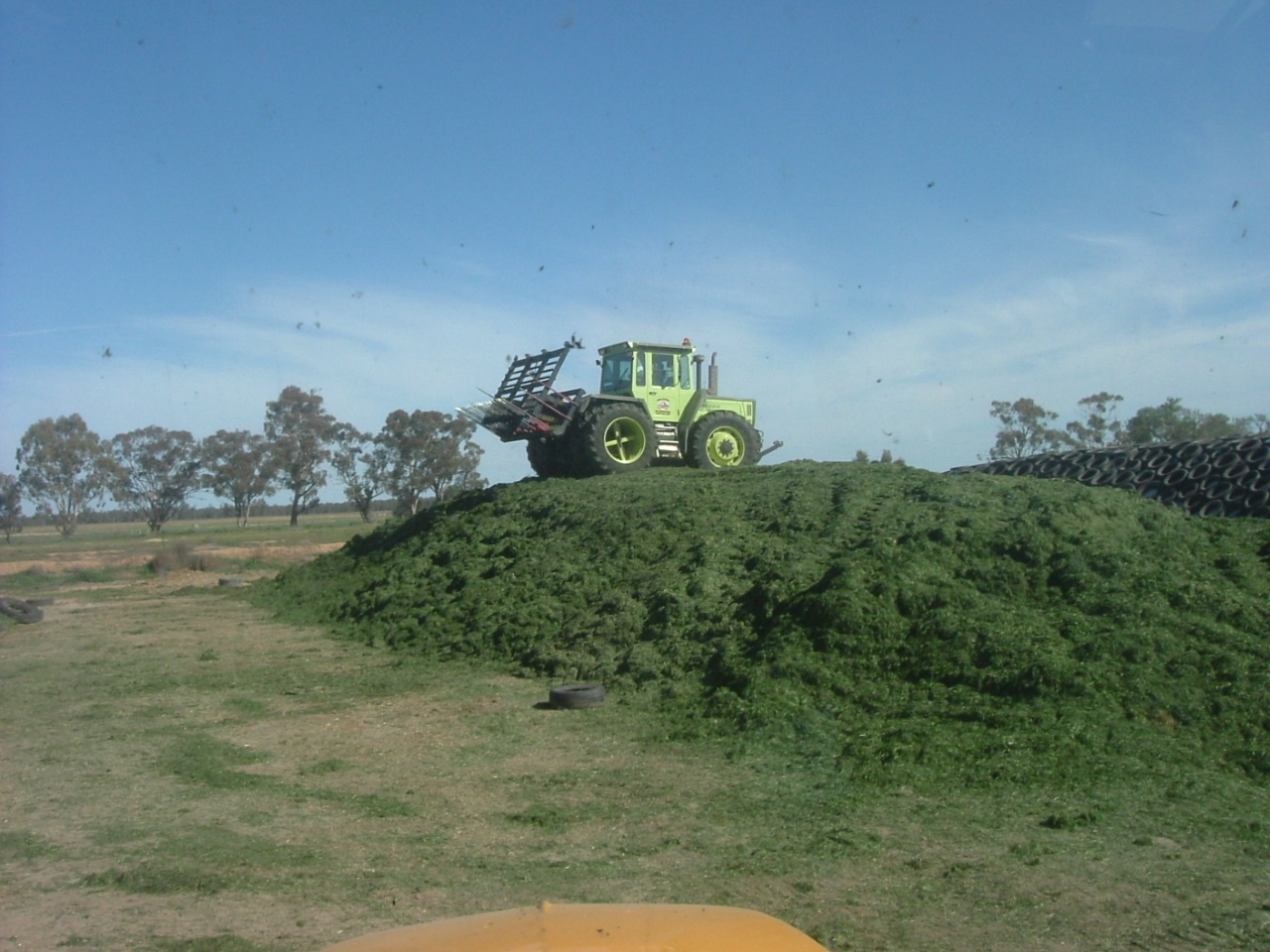
MB Trac rolling a silage heap or "clamp" in Victoria, Australia

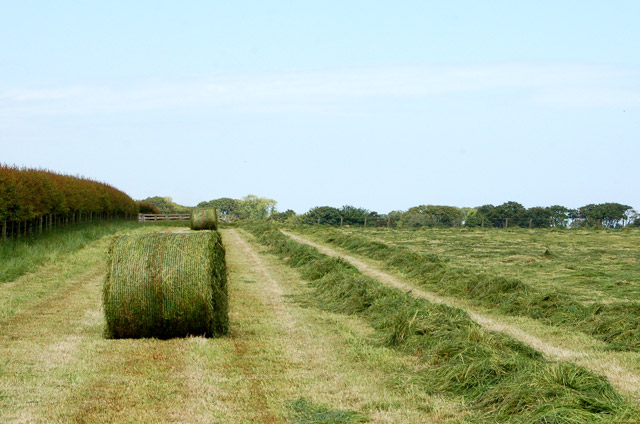
Partially dried mown grass is formed into cylindrical bales in the field (above) and sealed in polywrap (below).

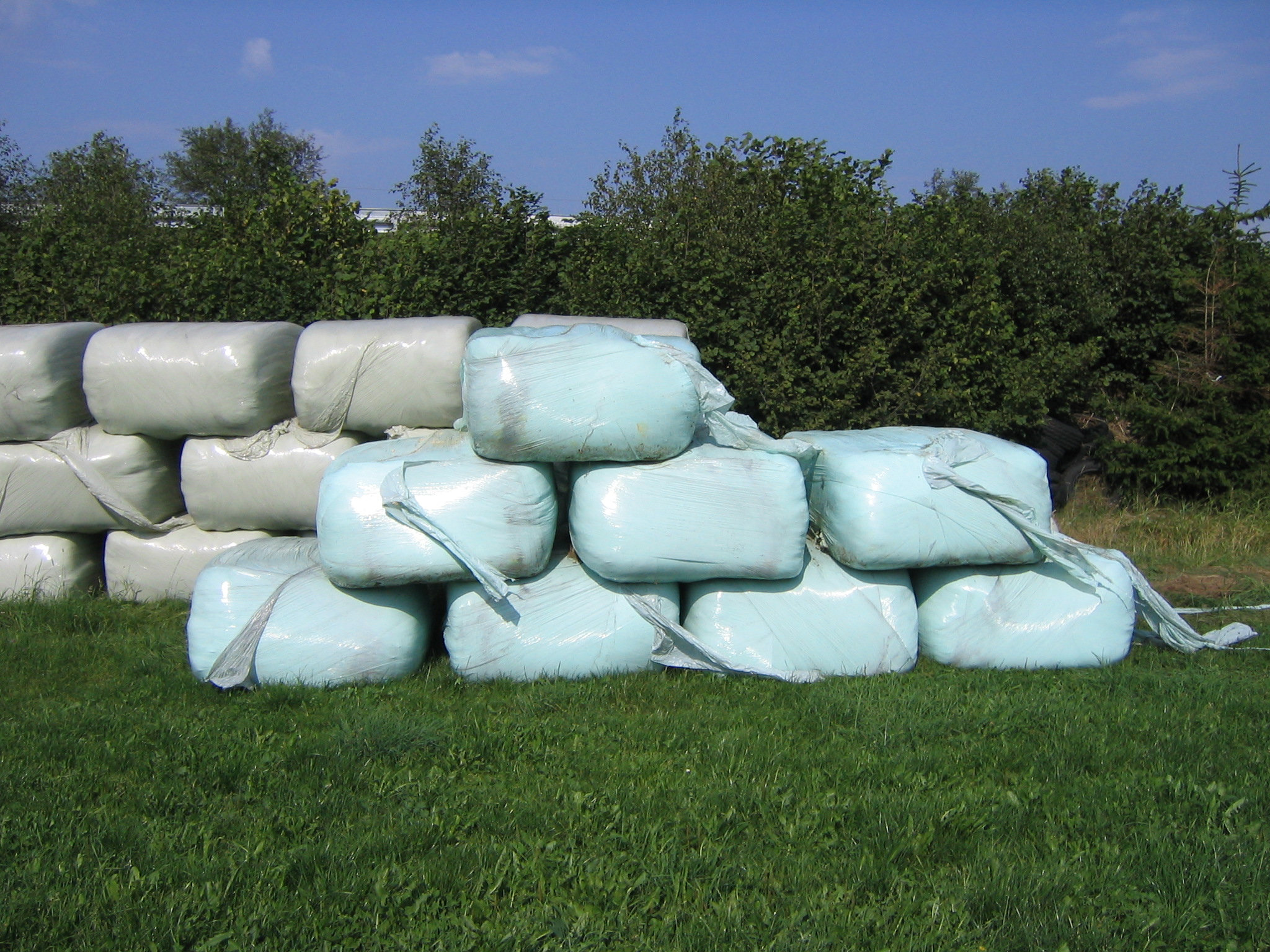

The crops most often used for ensilage are the ordinary grasses, clovers, alfalfa, vetches, oats, rye, and maize. Many crops have ensilaging potential, including potatoes and various weeds, notably spurrey such as Spergula arvensis. Silage must be made from plant material with a suitable moisture content: about 50–60% depending on the means of storage, the degree of compression, and the amount of water that will be lost in storage, but not exceeding 75%. Weather during harvest need not be as fair and dry as when harvesting for drying. For corn, harvest begins when the whole-plant moisture is at a suitable level, ideally a few days before it is ripe. For pasture-type crops, the grass is mown and allowed to wilt for a day or so until the moisture content drops to a suitable level. Ideally the crop is mowed when in full flower, and deposited in the silo on the day of its cutting.

After harvesting, crops are shredded to pieces about 15 mm (1/2 in) long. The material is spread in uniform layers over the floor of the silo, and closely packed. When the silo is filled or the stack built, a layer of straw or some other dry porous substance may be spread over the surface. In the silo, the pressure of the material, when chaffed, excludes air from all but the top layer; in the case of the stack, extra pressure is applied by weights to prevent excessive heating.

=== Equipment ===
Forage harvesters collect and chop the plant material, and deposit it in trucks or wagons. These forage harvesters can be either tractor-drawn or self-propelled. Harvesters blow the chaff into the wagon through a chute at the rear or side of the machine. Chaff may also be emptied into a bagger, which puts the silage into a large plastic bag that is laid out on the ground.

In North America, Australia, northwestern Europe, and New Zealand, it is common for silage to be placed in large heaps on the ground, compacted by tractor to push out the air, then covered with plastic sheets that are held down by used tires or tire ring walls. In New Zealand and Northern Europe, "clamps" made of concrete or old wooden railway ties (sleepers) and built into the side of a bank are sometimes used. The chopped grass can then be dumped in at the top, to be drawn from the bottom in winter. This requires considerable effort to compress the stack in the silo to cure it properly. Again, the pit is covered with a plastic sheet and weighed down with tires.

In an alternative method, the cut vegetation is formed into bales using a baler, making balage (North America) or silage bales (UK, Australia, New Zealand). The grass or other forage is cut and partly dried until it contains 30–40% moisture (much drier than bulk silage, but too damp to be stored as dry hay). It is then made into large bales, which are wrapped tightly in plastic to exclude air. The plastic may wrap the whole of each cylindrical or cuboid bale, or be wrapped around only the curved sides of a cylindrical bale, leaving the ends uncovered. In this case, the bales are placed tightly end to end on the ground, making a long continuous "sausage" of silage, often at the side of a field. The wrapping may be performed by a bale wrapper, while the baled silage is handled using a bale handler or a front-loader, either impaling the bale on a flap, or by using a special grab. The flaps do not hole the bales.

In the UK, baled silage is most often made in round bales about 1.2 m × 1.2 m (4 ft × 4 ft), individually wrapped with four to six layers of "bale wrap plastic" (black, white or green 25-micrometre stretch film). The percentage of dry matter can vary from about 20% dry matter upwards. The continuous "sausage" referred to above is made with a special machine that wraps the bales as they are pushed through a rotating hoop, which applies the bale wrap to the outside of the bales (round or square) in a continuous wrap. The machine places the bales on the ground after wrapping by moving forward slowly during the wrapping process.

== Haylage ==
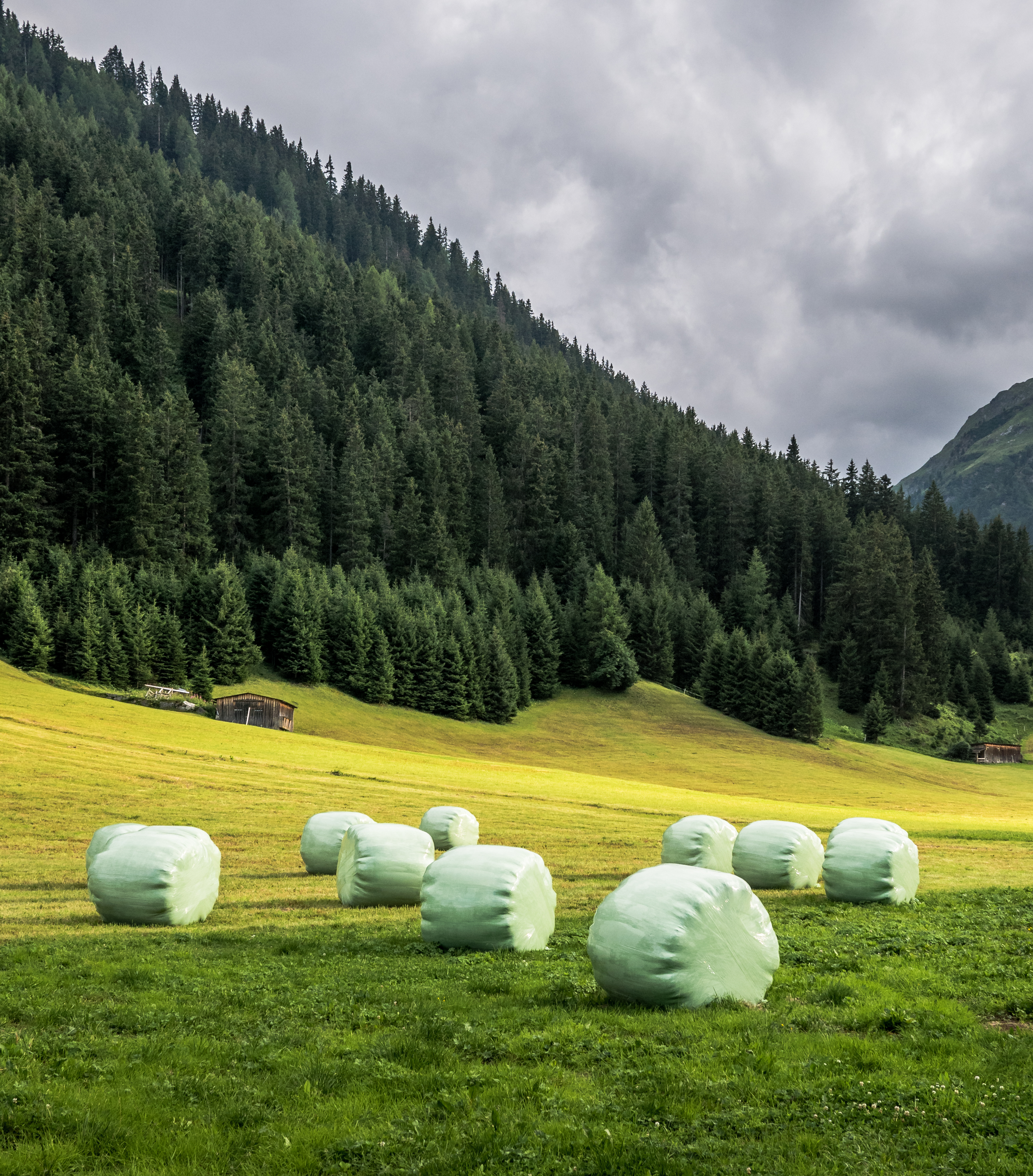
Haylage bales in Tyrol

Haylage sometimes refers to high-dry-matter silage of around 40–60%, typically made from hay. Horse haylage is usually 60–70% dry matter, made in small bales or larger bales.

Handling of wrapped bales is most often with some type of gripper that squeezes the plastic-covered bale between two metal parts to avoid puncturing the plastic. Simple fixed versions are available for round bales, which are made of two shaped pipes or tubes spaced apart to slide under the sides of the bale, but when lifted will not let it slip through. Often used on the tractor's loader as an attachment called a bale grabber, they incorporate a trip tipping mechanism which can flip the bales over on to the flat side or end for storage on the thickest plastic layers.

== Fermentation ==
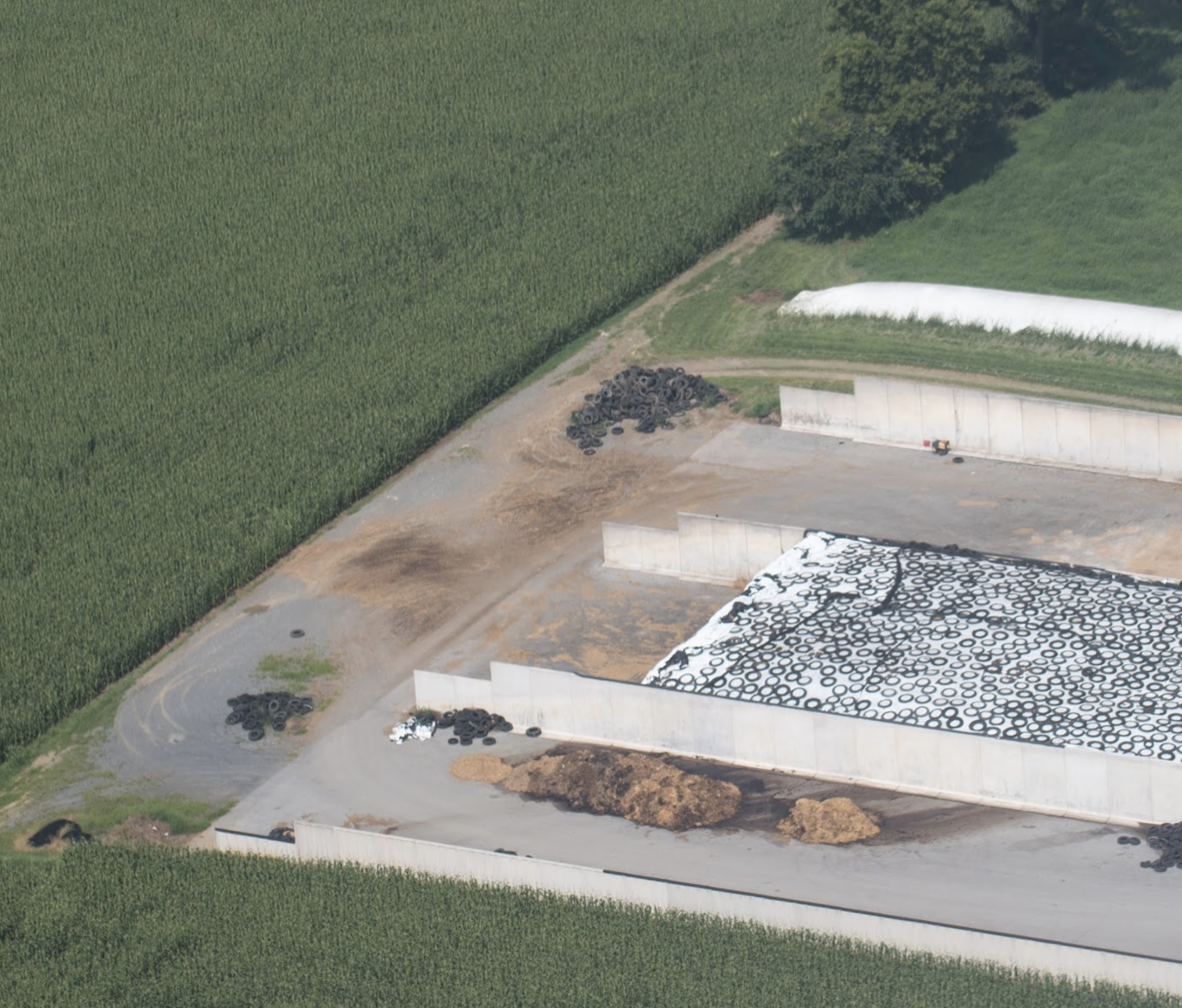
Top view of silage fermentation

Silage undergoes anaerobic fermentation, which starts about 48 hours after the silo is filled, and converts sugars to acids. Fermentation is essentially complete after about two weeks.

Before anaerobic fermentation starts, there is an aerobic phase in which the trapped oxygen is consumed. How closely the fodder is packed determines the nature of the resulting silage by regulating the chemical reactions that occur in the stack. When closely packed, the supply of oxygen is limited, and the attendant acid fermentation brings about decomposition of the carbohydrates present into acetic, butyric, and lactic acids. This product is named sour silage. If the fodder is unchaffed and loosely packed, or the silo is built gradually, then oxidation proceeds more rapidly and the temperature rises; if the mass is compressed when the temperature is 60–70 °C (140–160 °F), then the action ceases and sweet silage results. The nitrogenous ingredients of the fodder also change: in making sour silage, as much as one-third of the albuminoids may be converted into amino and ammonium compounds; in making sweet silage, a smaller proportion is changed, but they become less digestible. If the fermentation process is poorly managed, then sour silage acquires an unpleasant odour due to excess production of ammonia or butyric acid (the latter is responsible for the smell of rancid butter).

In the past, the fermentation was conducted by indigenous microorganisms, but, today, some bulk silage is inoculated with specific microorganisms to speed fermentation or improve the resulting silage. Silage inoculants contain one or more strains of lactic acid bacteria, and the most common is Lactobacillus plantarum. Other bacteria used include Lactobacillus buchneri, Enterococcus faecium, and Pediococcus species.

Ryegrasses have high sugars and respond to nitrogen fertiliser better than any other grass species. These two qualities have made ryegrass the most popular grass for silage-making for the last sixty years. There are three ryegrasses in seed form and commonly used: Italian, Perennial and Hybrid.

== Pollution and waste ==
The fermentation process of silo or pit silage releases liquid. Silo effluent is corrosive. It can also contaminate water sources unless collected and treated. The high nutrient content can lead to eutrophication (hypertrophication), the growth of bacterial or algal blooms.

Plastic sheeting used for sealing pit or baled silage needs proper disposal, and some areas have recycling schemes for it. Traditionally, farms have burned silage plastics; however, odor and smoke concerns have led certain communities to restrict that practice.

== Storing silage ==
Silage must be firmly packed to minimize the oxygen content, lest it spoil.

Silage goes through four major stages in a silo:

- Presealing, which, after the first few days after filling a silo, enables some respiration and some dry-matter loss, but stops.
- Fermentation, which occurs over a few weeks. pH drops, and there is more dry-matter loss, but hemicellulose is broken down; aerobic respiration stops.
- Infiltration, which enables some oxygen infiltration, allowing for limited microbial respiration. Available carbohydrates are lost as heat and gas.
- Emptying, which exposes surface, causing additional loss; rate of loss increases.

== Safety ==
Silos are potentially hazardous: deaths may occur in the process of filling and maintaining them, and several safety precautions are necessary. There is a risk of injury by machinery or from falls. When a silo is filled, fine dust particles in the air can become explosive because of their large aggregate surface area. Also, fermentation presents respiratory hazards. The ensiling process produces "silo gas" during the early stages of the fermentation process. Silage gas contains nitric oxide (NO), which will react with oxygen (O_{2}) in the air to form nitrogen dioxide (NO_{2}), which is toxic. Lack of oxygen inside the silo can cause asphyxiation. Molds that grow when air reaches cured silage can cause organic dust toxic syndrome. Collapsing silage from large bunker silos has caused deaths.

Silage itself poses no special danger, and the improvement in legislation to regulate the animal-food industry has reduced the problems concerning food-related human diseases by improvement of the hygienic quality of silage. Milk from cows fed with silage containing clostridial spores could represent a risk in hard-cheese production. A special focus has to be directed to zoonotic pathogens like listeria, mycotoxins, clostridia, and E. coli bacteria as a result of deficient hygiene in silage production and could end up in dairy products.

== Nutrition ==
Silage can be substituted for root crops. Bulk silage is commonly fed to dairy cattle, while baled silage tends to be used for beef cattle, sheep, and horses. The advantages of silage as animal feed are several:

- During fermentation, the silage bacteria act on the cellulose and carbohydrates in the forage to produce volatile fatty acids (VFAs), such as acetic, propionic, lactic, and butyric acids. By lowering pH, these produce a hostile environment for competing bacteria that might cause spoilage. The VFAs thus act as natural preservatives, in the same way that the lactic acid in yogurt and cheese increases the preservability of what began as milk, or how vinegar (dilute acetic acid) preserves pickled vegetables. This preservative action is particularly important during winter in temperate regions, when green forage is unavailable.
- When silage is prepared under optimal conditions, the modest acidity also has the effect of improving palatability, and provides a dietary contrast for the animal. (However, excessive production of acetic and butyric acids can reduce palatability: the mix of bacteria is ideally chosen so as to maximize lactic acid production.)
- Several of the fermenting organisms produce vitamins: for example, lactobacillus species produce folate and vitamin B12.
- The fermentation process that produces VFA also yields energy that the bacteria use: some of the energy is released as heat. Silage is thus modestly lower in caloric content than the original forage, in the same way that yogurt has modestly fewer calories than milk. However, this loss of energy is offset by the preservation characteristics and improved digestibility of silage.

== Anaerobic digestion ==
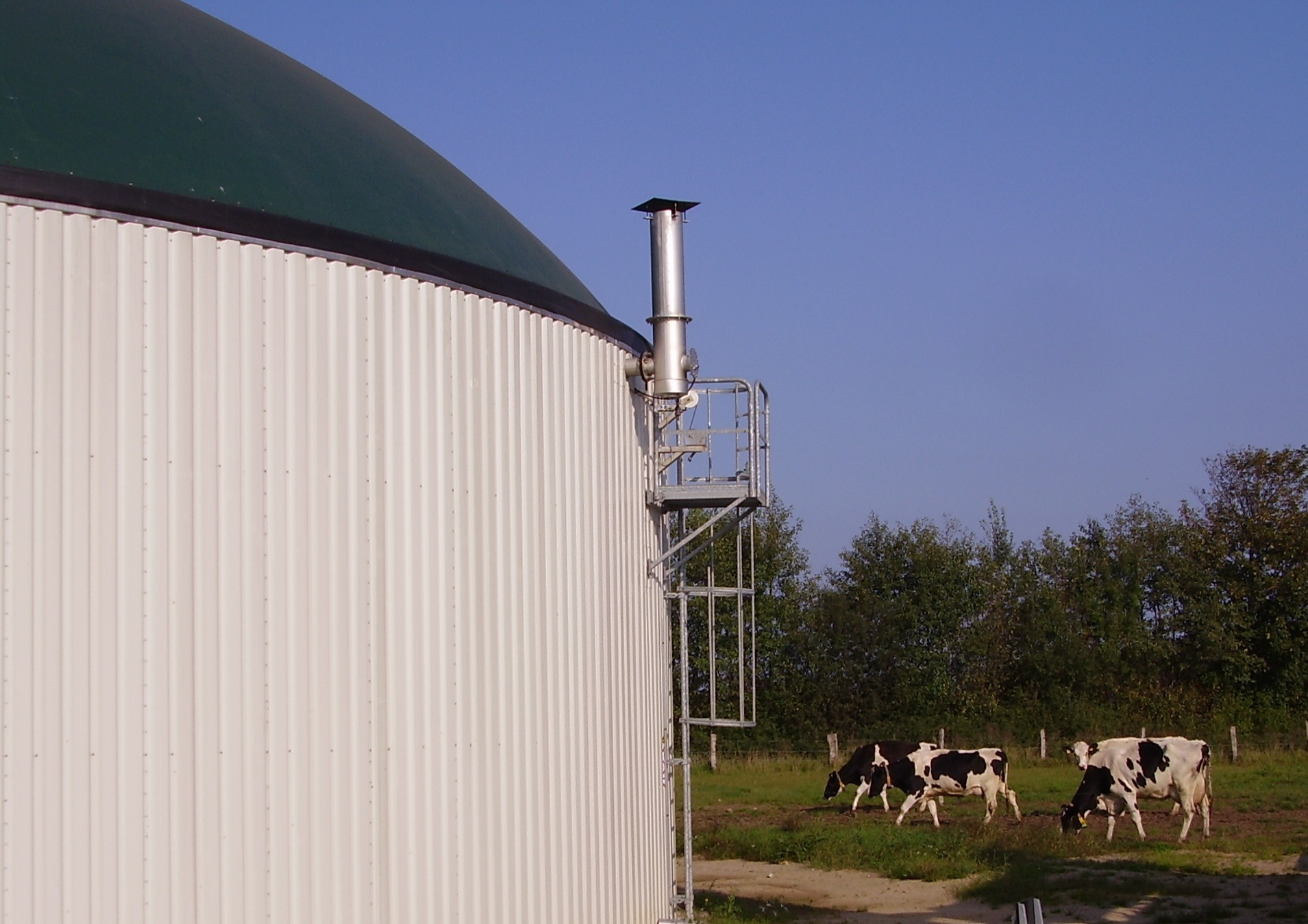
Anaerobic digester

Silage may be used for anaerobic digestion.

== Fish silage ==
Fish silage is a method used for conserving by-products from fishing for later use as feed in fish farming. This way, the parts of the fish that are not used as human food such as fish guts (entrails), fish heads, and trimmings are used as ingredients in feed pellets. The silage is performed by first grinding the remains and mixing it with formic acid, and then storing it in a tank. The acid helps with preservation as well as further dissolving the residues. Process tanks for fish silage can be aboard ships or on land.

== See also ==
- Grain crimping
- Grain bin
