= Mannosylglycerate synthase =

Class of enzymes

Identifiers
- EC no.: 2.4.1.269

Databases
- IntEnz: IntEnz view
- BRENDA: BRENDA entry
- ExPASy: NiceZyme view
- KEGG: KEGG entry
- MetaCyc: metabolic pathway
- PRIAM: profile
- PDB structures: RCSB PDB PDBe PDBsum
Search
- PMC: articles
- PubMed: articles
- NCBI: proteins

Mannosylglycerate synthase (EC 2.4.1.269) is an enzyme with systematic name GDP-mannose:D-glycerate 2-alpha-D-mannosyltransferase. It catalyses the following chemical reaction

D-glyceric acid
+ GDP-mannose
GDP
2-(α-D-mannosyl)-D-glyceric acid

The enzyme characterised from transfers a mannose sugar unit from GDP-mannose to D-glyceric acid, giving 2-(α-D-mannosyl)-D-glyceric acid, with guanosine diphosphate (GDP) as a byproduct. In thermophilic bacteria, the product protects against osmotic shock and in some cases is produced in a two-step process that uses mannosyl-3-phosphoglycerate synthase to give a phosphoglycerate intermediate which is hydrolysed by the enzyme mannosyl-3-phosphoglycerate phosphatase.
