= Phosphoenolpyruvic carboxylase =

Phosphoenolpyruvic carboxylase may refer to:

- Phosphoenolpyruvate carboxykinase (diphosphate), an enzyme
- Phosphoenolpyruvate carboxykinase (ATP), an enzyme
