= C4 carbon fixation =

Photosynthetic process in some plants

Leaf anatomy in most C_{4} plants. A: Mesophyll cell B: Chloroplast C: Vascular tissue D: Bundle sheath cell E: Stoma F: Vascular tissue: 1. CO_{2} is fixed to produce a four-carbon molecule (malate or aspartate).; 2. The molecule exits the cell and enters the bundle sheath cells.; 3. It is then broken down into CO_{2} and pyruvate. CO_{2} enters the Calvin cycle to produce carbohydrates.; 4. Pyruvate reenters the mesophyll cell, where it is reused to produce malate or aspartate.

C_{4} carbon fixation or the Hatch–Slack pathway is one of three known photosynthetic processes of carbon fixation in plants. It owes the names to the 1960s discovery by Marshall Davidson Hatch and Charles Roger Slack.

C_{4} fixation is an addition to the ancestral and more common C_{3} carbon fixation. The main carboxylating enzyme in C_{3} photosynthesis is called RuBisCO, which catalyses two distinct reactions using either CO_{2} (carboxylation) or oxygen (oxygenation) as a substrate. RuBisCO oxygenation gives rise to phosphoglycolate, which is toxic and requires the expenditure of energy to recycle through photorespiration. C_{4} photosynthesis reduces photorespiration by concentrating CO_{2} around RuBisCO.

To enable RuBisCO to work in a cellular environment where there is a lot of carbon dioxide and very little oxygen, the leaves of C_{4} plants generally contain two partially isolated compartments called mesophyll cells and bundle-sheath cells. CO_{2} is initially fixed in the mesophyll cells in a reaction catalysed by the enzyme PEP carboxylase in which the three-carbon phosphoenolpyruvate (PEP) reacts with CO_{2} to form the four-carbon oxaloacetic acid (OAA). OAA can then be reduced to malate or transaminated to aspartate. These intermediates diffuse to the bundle sheath cells, where they are decarboxylated, creating a CO_{2}-rich environment around RuBisCO and thereby suppressing photorespiration. The resulting pyruvate (PYR), together with about half of the phosphoglycerate (PGA) produced by RuBisCO, diffuses back to the mesophyll. PGA is then chemically reduced and diffuses back to the bundle sheath to complete the reductive pentose phosphate cycle (RPP). This exchange of metabolites is essential for C_{4} photosynthesis to work.

Additional biochemical steps require more energy in the form of ATP to regenerate PEP, but concentrating CO_{2} allows high rates of photosynthesis at higher temperatures. Higher CO_{2} concentration overcomes the reduction of gas solubility with temperature (Henry's law). The CO_{2} concentrating mechanism also maintains high gradients of CO_{2} concentration across the stomatal pores. This means that C_{4} plants have generally lower stomatal conductance, reduced water losses and have generally higher water-use efficiency. C_{4} plants are also more efficient in using nitrogen, since PEP carboxylase is cheaper to make than RuBisCO. However, since the C_{3} pathway does not require extra energy for the regeneration of PEP, it is more efficient in conditions where photorespiration is limited, typically at low temperatures and in the shade.

== Discovery ==
The first experiments indicating that some plants do not use C_{3} carbon fixation but instead produce malate and aspartate in the first step of carbon fixation were done in the 1950s and early 1960s by Hugo Peter Kortschak and Yuri Karpilov. The C_{4} pathway was elucidated by Marshall Davidson Hatch and Charles Roger Slack, in Australia, in 1966. While Hatch and Slack originally referred to the pathway as the "C_{4} dicarboxylic acid pathway", it is sometimes called the Hatch–Slack pathway.

== Anatomy ==
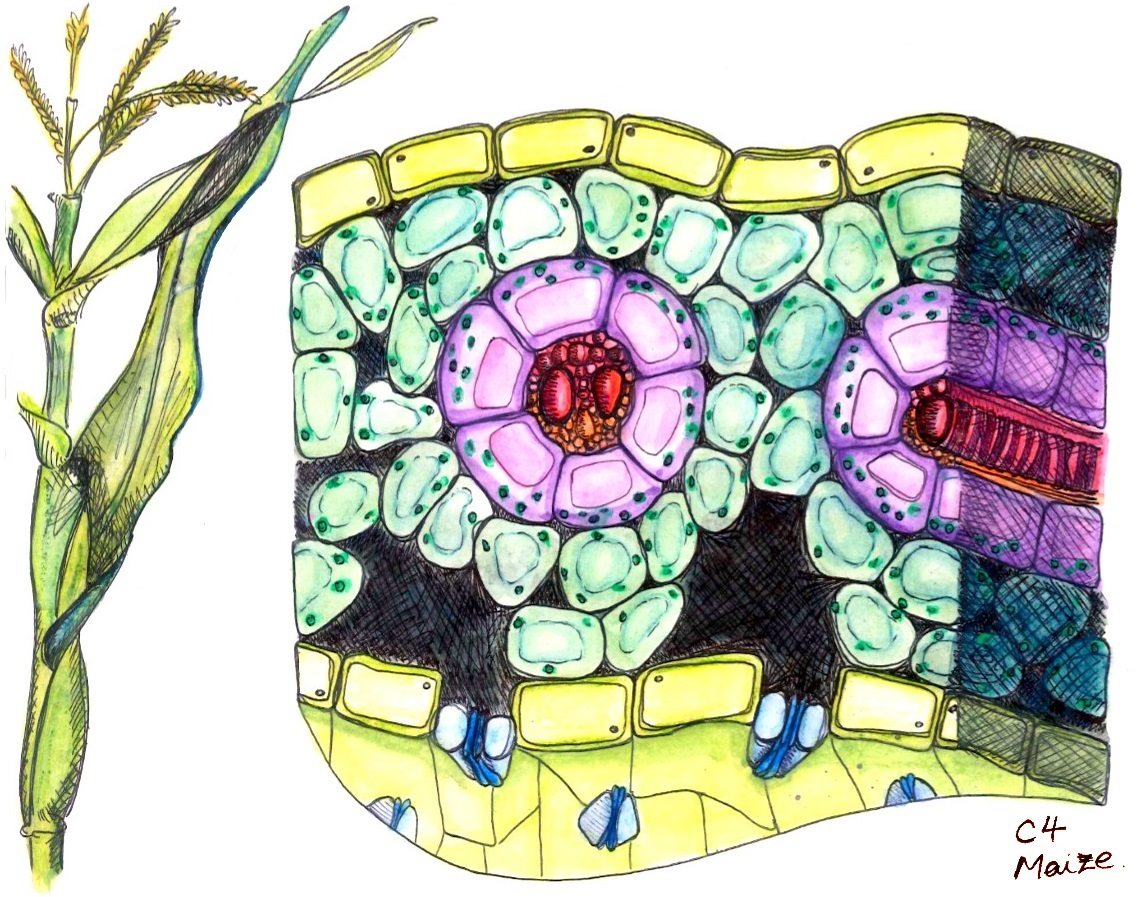
Cross section of a maize leaf, a C_{4} plant. Kranz anatomy (rings of cells) shown

C_{4} plants often possess a characteristic leaf anatomy called kranz anatomy, from the German word for wreath. Their vascular bundles are surrounded by two rings of cells; the inner ring, called bundle sheath cells, contains starch-rich chloroplasts lacking grana, which differ from those in mesophyll cells present as the outer ring. Hence, the chloroplasts are called dimorphic. The primary function of kranz anatomy is to provide a site in which CO_{2} can be concentrated around RuBisCO, thereby avoiding photorespiration. Mesophyll and bundle sheath cells are connected through numerous cytoplasmic sleeves called plasmodesmata whose permeability at leaf level is called bundle sheath conductance. A layer of suberin is often deposed at the level of the middle lamella (tangential interface between mesophyll and bundle sheath) in order to reduce the apoplastic diffusion of CO_{2} (called leakage). The carbon concentration mechanism in C_{4} plants distinguishes their isotopic signature from other photosynthetic organisms.

Although most C_{4} plants exhibit kranz anatomy, there are, however, a few species that operate a limited C_{4} cycle without any distinct bundle sheath tissue. Suaeda aralocaspica, Bienertia cycloptera, Bienertia sinuspersici and Bienertia kavirense (all chenopods) are terrestrial plants that inhabit dry, salty depressions in the deserts of the Middle East. These plants have been shown to operate single-cell C_{4} CO_{2}-concentrating mechanisms, which are unique among the known C_{4} mechanisms. Although the cytology of both genera differs slightly, the basic principle is that fluid-filled vacuoles are employed to divide the cell into two separate areas. Carboxylation enzymes in the cytosol are separated from decarboxylase enzymes and RuBisCO in the chloroplasts. A diffusive barrier is between the chloroplasts (which contain RuBisCO) and the cytosol. This enables a bundle-sheath-type area and a mesophyll-type area to be established within a single cell. Although this does allow a limited C_{4} cycle to operate, it is relatively inefficient. Much leakage of CO_{2} from around RuBisCO occurs.

There is also evidence of inducible C_{4} photosynthesis by non-kranz aquatic macrophyte Hydrilla verticillata under warm conditions, although the mechanism by which CO_{2} leakage from around RuBisCO is minimised is currently uncertain.

== Biochemistry ==
In C_{3} plants, the first step in the light-independent reactions of photosynthesis is the fixation of CO_{2} by the enzyme RuBisCO to form 3-phosphoglycerate. However, RuBisCo has a dual carboxylase and oxygenase activity. Oxygenation results in part of the substrate being oxidized rather than carboxylated, resulting in loss of substrate and consumption of energy, in what is known as photorespiration. Oxygenation and carboxylation are competitive, meaning that the rate of the reactions depends on the relative concentration of oxygen and CO_{2}.

In order to reduce the rate of photorespiration, C_{4} plants increase the concentration of CO_{2} around RuBisCO. Often, to facilitate this, two partially isolated compartments differentiate within leaves: the mesophyll and the bundle sheath. Instead of direct fixation by RuBisCO, CO_{2} is initially incorporated into a four-carbon organic acid (either malate or aspartate) in the mesophyll. The organic acids then diffuse through plasmodesmata into the bundle sheath cells. There, they are decarboxylated creating a CO_{2}-rich environment. The chloroplasts of the bundle sheath cells convert this CO_{2} into carbohydrates by the conventional C_{3} pathway.

There is large variability in the biochemical features of C4 assimilation, and it is generally grouped in three subtypes, differentiated by the main enzyme used for decarboxylation ( NADP-malic enzyme, NADP-ME; NAD-malic enzyme, NAD-ME; and PEP carboxykinase, PEPCK). Since PEPCK is often recruited atop NADP-ME or NAD-ME it was proposed to classify the biochemical variability in two subtypes. For instance, maize and sugarcane use a combination of NADP-ME and PEPCK, millet uses preferentially NAD-ME and Megathyrsus maximus, uses preferentially PEPCK.

=== NADP-ME ===
NADP-ME subtype

The first step in the NADP-ME type C_{4} pathway is the conversion of pyruvate (Pyr) to phosphoenolpyruvate (PEP), by the enzyme Pyruvate phosphate dikinase (PPDK). This reaction requires inorganic phosphate and ATP plus pyruvate, producing PEP, AMP, and inorganic pyrophosphate (PP_{i}). The next step is the carboxylation of PEP by the PEP carboxylase enzyme (PEPC) producing oxaloacetate. Both of these steps occur in the mesophyll cells:

pyruvate + P_{i} + ATP → PEP + AMP + PP_{i}
PEP + CO_{2} → oxaloacetate

PEPC has a low K_{M} for HCO^{−}_{3} — and, hence, high affinity, and is not confounded by O_{2} thus it will work even at low concentrations of CO_{2}.

The product is usually converted to malate (M), which diffuses to the bundle-sheath cells surrounding a nearby vein. Here, it is decarboxylated by the NADP-malic enzyme (NADP-ME) to produce CO_{2} and pyruvate. The CO_{2} is fixed by RuBisCo to produce phosphoglycerate (PGA) while the pyruvate is transported back to the mesophyll cell, together with about half of the phosphoglycerate (PGA). This PGA is chemically reduced in the mesophyll and diffuses back to the bundle sheath where it enters the conversion phase of the Calvin cycle. For each CO_{2} molecule exported to the bundle sheath the malate shuttle transfers two electrons, and therefore reduces the demand of reducing power in the bundle sheath.

=== NAD-ME ===
NAD-ME subtype

Here, the OAA produced by PEPC is transaminated by aspartate aminotransferase to aspartate (ASP) which is the metabolite diffusing to the bundle sheath. In the bundle sheath ASP is transaminated again to OAA and then undergoes a futile reduction and oxidative decarboxylation to release CO_{2}. The resulting Pyruvate is transaminated to alanine, diffusing to the mesophyll. Alanine is finally transaminated to pyruvate (PYR) which can be regenerated to PEP by PPDK in the mesophyll chloroplasts. This cycle bypasses the reaction of malate dehydrogenase in the mesophyll and therefore does not transfer reducing equivalents to the bundle sheath.

=== PEPCK ===
PEPCK subtype

In this variant the OAA produced by aspartate aminotransferase in the bundle sheath is decarboxylated to PEP by PEPCK. The fate of PEP is still debated. The simplest explanation is that PEP would diffuse back to the mesophyll to serve as a substrate for PEPC. Because PEPCK uses only one ATP molecule, the regeneration of PEP through PEPCK would theoretically increase photosynthetic efficiency of this subtype, however this has never been measured. An increase in relative expression of PEPCK has been observed under low light, and it has been proposed to play a role in facilitating balancing energy requirements between mesophyll and bundle sheath.

=== Metabolite exchange ===
While in C_{3} photosynthesis each chloroplast is capable of completing light reactions and dark reactions, C_{4} chloroplasts differentiate in two populations, contained in the mesophyll and bundle sheath cells. The division of the photosynthetic work between two types of chloroplasts results inevitably in a prolific exchange of intermediates between them. The fluxes are large and can be up to ten times the rate of gross assimilation. The type of metabolite exchanged and the overall rate will depend on the subtype. To reduce product inhibition of photosynthetic enzymes (for instance PECP) concentration gradients need to be as low as possible. This requires increasing the conductance of metabolites between mesophyll and bundle sheath, but this would also increase the retro-diffusion of CO_{2} out of the bundle sheath, resulting in an inherent and inevitable trade off in the optimisation of the CO_{2} concentrating mechanism.

== Light harvesting and light reactions ==
To meet the NADPH and ATP demands in the mesophyll and bundle sheath, light needs to be harvested and shared between two distinct electron transfer chains. ATP may be produced in the bundle sheath mainly through cyclic electron flow around Photosystem I, or in the mesophyll mainly through linear electron flow, depending on the light available in the bundle sheath or in the mesophyll. The relative requirement of ATP and NADPH in each type of cell will depend on the photosynthetic subtype. The apportioning of excitation energy between the two cell types will influence the availability of ATP and NADPH in the mesophyll and bundle sheath. For instance, green light is not strongly adsorbed by mesophyll cells and can preferentially excite bundle sheath cells, or vice versa for blue light. Because bundle sheaths are surrounded by mesophyll, light harvesting in the mesophyll will reduce the light available to reach bundle sheath cells. Also, the bundle sheath size limits the amount of light that can be harvested.

== Efficiency ==
Different formulations of efficiency are possible depending on which outputs and inputs are considered. For instance, average quantum efficiency is the ratio between gross assimilation and either absorbed or incident light intensity. Large variability of measured quantum efficiency is reported in the literature between plants grown in different conditions and classified in different subtypes but the underpinnings are still unclear. One of the components of quantum efficiency is the efficiency of dark reactions, biochemical efficiency, which is generally expressed in reciprocal terms as ATP cost of gross assimilation (ATP/GA).

In C_{3} photosynthesis ATP/GA depends mainly on CO_{2} and O_{2} concentration at the carboxylating sites of RuBisCO. When CO_{2} concentration is high and O_{2} concentration is low photorespiration is suppressed and C_{3} assimilation is fast and efficient, with ATP/GA approaching the theoretical minimum of 3.

In C_{4} photosynthesis CO_{2} concentration at the RuBisCO carboxylating sites is mainly the result of the operation of the CO_{2} concentrating mechanisms, which cost circa an additional 2 ATP/GA but makes efficiency relatively insensitive of external CO_{2} concentration in a broad range of conditions.

Biochemical efficiency depends mainly on the speed of CO_{2} delivery to the bundle sheath, and will generally decrease under low light when PEP carboxylation rate decreases, lowering the ratio of CO_{2}/O_{2} concentration at the carboxylating sites of RuBisCO. The key parameter defining how much efficiency will decrease under low light is bundle sheath conductance. Plants with higher bundle sheath conductance will be facilitated in the exchange of metabolites between the mesophyll and bundle sheath and will be capable of high rates of assimilation under high light. However, they will also have high rates of CO_{2} retro-diffusion from the bundle sheath (called leakage) which will increase photorespiration and decrease biochemical efficiency under dim light. This represents an inherent and inevitable trade off in the operation of C_{4} photosynthesis. C_{4} plants have an outstanding capacity to attune bundle sheath conductance. Interestingly, bundle sheath conductance is downregulated in plants grown under low light and in plants grown under high light subsequently transferred to low light as it occurs in crop canopies where older leaves are shaded by new growth.

== Evolution and advantages ==
C_{4} plants have a competitive advantage over plants possessing the more common C_{3} carbon fixation pathway under conditions of drought, high temperatures, and nitrogen or CO_{2} limitation. When grown in the same environment, at 30 °C, C_{3} grasses lose approximately 833 molecules of water per CO_{2} molecule that is fixed, whereas C_{4} grasses lose only 277. This increased water use efficiency of C_{4} grasses means that soil moisture is conserved, allowing them to grow for longer in arid environments.

C_{4} carbon fixation has evolved in at least 62 independent occasions in 19 different families of plants, making it a prime example of convergent evolution. This convergence may have been facilitated by the fact that many potential evolutionary pathways to a C_{4} phenotype exist, many of which involve initial evolutionary steps not directly related to photosynthesis. C_{4} plants arose around 35 million years ago during the Oligocene (precisely when is difficult to determine) and were becoming ecologically significant in the early Miocene around 21 million years ago. C_{4} metabolism in grasses originated when their habitat migrated from the shady forest undercanopy to more open environments, where the high sunlight gave it an advantage over the C_{3} pathway. Drought was not necessary for its innovation; rather, the increased parsimony in water use was a byproduct of the pathway and allowed C_{4} plants to more readily colonize arid environments.

Today, C_{4} plants represent about 5% of Earth's plant biomass and 3% of its known plant species. Despite this scarcity, they account for about 23% of terrestrial carbon fixation. Increasing the proportion of C_{4} plants on earth could assist biosequestration of CO_{2} and represent an important climate change avoidance strategy. Present-day C_{4} plants are concentrated in the tropics and subtropics (below latitudes of 45 degrees) where the high air temperature increases rates of photorespiration in C_{3} plants.

== Plants that use C_{4} carbon fixation ==
About 8,100 plant species use C_{4} carbon fixation, which represents about 3% of all terrestrial species of plants. All these 8,100 species are angiosperms. C_{4} carbon fixation is more common in monocots compared with dicots, with 40% of monocots using the C_{4} pathway, compared with only 4.5% of dicots. Despite this, only three families of monocots use C_{4} carbon fixation compared to 15 dicot families. Of the monocot clades containing C_{4} plants, the grass (Poaceae) species use the C_{4} photosynthetic pathway most. 46% of grasses are C_{4} and together account for 61% of C_{4} species. C_{4} has arisen independently in the grass family some twenty or more times, in various subfamilies, tribes, and genera, including the Andropogoneae tribe which contains the food crops maize, sugar cane, and sorghum. Teff is also C_{4}, as are various kinds of millet. Of the dicot clades containing C_{4} species, the order Caryophyllales contains the most species. Of the families in the Caryophyllales, the Chenopodiaceae use C_{4} carbon fixation the most, with 550 out of 1,400 species using it. About 250 of the 1,000 species of the related Amaranthaceae also use C_{4}.

Members of the sedge family Cyperaceae, and members of numerous families of eudicots – including Asteraceae (the daisy family), Brassicaceae (the cabbage family), and Euphorbiaceae (the spurge family) – also use C_{4}.

No large trees (above 15 m in height) use C_{4}, however a number of small trees or shrubs smaller than 10 m exist which do: six species of Euphorbiaceae all native to Hawaii and two species of Amaranthaceae growing in deserts of the Middle-East and Asia.

The following list summarizes the taxonomic distribution of plants with C_{4}:

Clades	Order	Family	Genus
Superasterids	Caryophyllales	Caryophyllaceae	Polycarpaea – 20 C_{4} species
Superasterids	Caryophyllales	Aizoaceae	Sesuvioideae – 30 C_{4} species, 1–6 origins
Superasterids	Caryophyllales	Amaranthaceae	Aerva (Amaranthoideae) – 4 C_{4} species; Alternanthera (Gomphrenoideae) – 17 C_{4} species (also includes C_{3}–C_{4} intermediates); Amaranthus (Amaranthoideae) – 90 C_{4} species; Atriplex (Chenopodioideae) – around 180 C_{4} species; Bassia–Camphorosma clade (Camphorosmoideae) – 24 C_{4} species (also includes one C_{3}–C_{4} intermediate), 1–2 origins; Bienertia (Suaedoideae) – 3 C_{4} species; Caroxyleae (syn. Caroxyloneae, Salsoloideae) – 157 C_{4} species; Gomphrenoids (Gomphrenoideae) – 138 C_{4} species; Salsoleae (Salsoloideae) – 158 C_{4} species, 2–4 origins; Suaeda aralocaspica (Suaedoideae); Suaeda sect. Salsina – 30 C_{4} species; Suaeda sect. Schoberia – 9 C_{4} species; Tecticornia – (Salicornioideae) 2 C_{4} species; Tidestromia (Gomphrenoideae) – 8 C_{4} species
Superasterids	Caryophyllales	Gisekiaceae	Gisekia pharnaceoides
Superasterids	Caryophyllales	Molluginaceae	Mollugo – 2 C_{4} species, 2 origins
Superasterids	Caryophyllales	Nyctaginaceae	Allionia – 2 C_{4} species; Boerhavia – 42 C_{4} species
Superasterids	Caryophyllales	Polygonaceae	Calligonum – 80 C_{4} species
Superasterids	Caryophyllales	Portulacaceae	Portulaca – 100 C_{4} species, 1–2 origins
Asterids - Lamiids	Boraginales	Heliotropiaceae	Euploca (also includes C_{3}–C_{4} intermediates) – 130 C_{4} species, 1–3 origins
Asterids - Lamiids	Lamiales	Acanthaceae	Blepharis – 15 C_{4} species, 1–4 origins
Asterids - Lamiids	Lamiales	Scrophulariaceae	Anticharis – 4 C_{4} species
Asterids - Campanulids	Asterales	Asteraceae	Flaveria (Tageteae) – 7 C_{4} species, 2–3 origins (also includes C_{3} and intermediate); Coreopsideae – 41 C_{4} species; Pectis (Tageteae) – 90 C_{4} species
Rosids - Fabids	Zygophyllales	Zygophyllaceae	Tribuloideae – 37 C_{4} species, 1–2 origins; Tetraena simplex
Rosids - Fabids	Malpighiales	Euphorbiaceae	Euphorbia subgenus Chamaesyce section Anisophyllum (also treated as genus Chamaesyce) – 350 C_{4} species (also including C_{3} and C_{3}–C_{4} intermediate species)
Rosids - Malvids	Brassicales	Cleomaceae	Cleome angustifolia; C. gynandra; C. oxalidea
Monocots	Alismatales	Hydrocharitaceae	the only known aquatic C_{4} plants: Egeria densa; Hydrilla verticillata
Monocots	Poales	Poaceae	Aristida – 288 C_{4} species; Stipagrostis – 56 C_{4} species; Chloridoideae (without Centropodieae) – 1596 C_{4} species; Centropodia – 4 C_{4} species; Eriachne – 50 C_{4} species; Tristachyideae – 87 C_{4} species; Andropogoneae – 1228 C_{4} species (incl. maize, sugarcane, sorghum); Reynaudia filiformis; Axonopus – 90 C_{4} species; Paspalum – 379 C_{4} species; Anthaenantia – 4 C_{4} species; Arthropoginae/Mesosetum clade – 35 C_{4} species, 1–2 origins; Arthropoginae/Onchorachis clade – 2 C_{4} species; Arthropoginae/Colaeteania clade – 7 C_{4} species, 1–2 origins; Anthephorinae – 286 C_{4} species; Echinochloa – 35 C_{4} species; Neurachne–Paraneurachne – 2 C_{4} species, 2 origins; Melinidinae–Panicinae–Cenchrinae – 889 C_{4} species; Alloteropsis – 5 C_{4} species, 1–2 origins (incl. C_{3} and intermediate)
Monocots	Poales	Cyperaceae	Bulbostylis – 211 C_{4} species; Cyperus – 757 C_{4} species; Eleocharis ser. Tenuissimae – 10 C_{4} species; Eleocharis vivipara; Fimbristylis – 303 C_{4} species; Rhynchospora – 40 C_{4} species

== Genetic engineering C_{4} rice project ==
Given the advantages of C_{4}, a group of scientists from institutions around the world are working on the C_{4} Rice Project to produce a strain of rice, naturally a C_{3} plant, that uses the C_{4} pathway by studying the C_{4} plants maize and Brachypodium. As rice is the world's most important human food—it is the staple food for more than half the planet—having rice that is more efficient at converting sunlight into grain could have significant global benefits towards improving food security. The team claims C_{4} rice could produce up to 50% more grain—and be able to do it with less water and nutrients.

The researchers have already identified genes needed for C_{4} photosynthesis in rice and are now looking towards developing a prototype C_{4} rice plant. In 2012, the Government of the United Kingdom along with the Bill & Melinda Gates Foundation provided US$14 million over three years towards the C_{4} Rice Project at the International Rice Research Institute. In 2019, the Bill & Melinda Gates Foundation granted another US$15 million to the Oxford-University-led C4 Rice Project. The goal of the 5-year project is to have experimental field plots up and running in Taiwan by 2024.

C_{2} photosynthesis, an intermediate step between C_{3} and Kranz C_{4}, may be preferred over C_{4} for rice conversion. The simpler system is less optimized for high light and high temperature conditions than C_{4}, but has the advantage of requiring fewer steps of genetic engineering and performing better than C_{3} under all temperatures and light levels. In 2021, the UK Government provided £1.2 million on studying C_{2} engineering.

== See also ==
- C_{2} photosynthesis
- C_{3} photosynthesis
- CAM photosynthesis
