= South Mountain Concert Hall =

- U.S. National Register of Historic Places
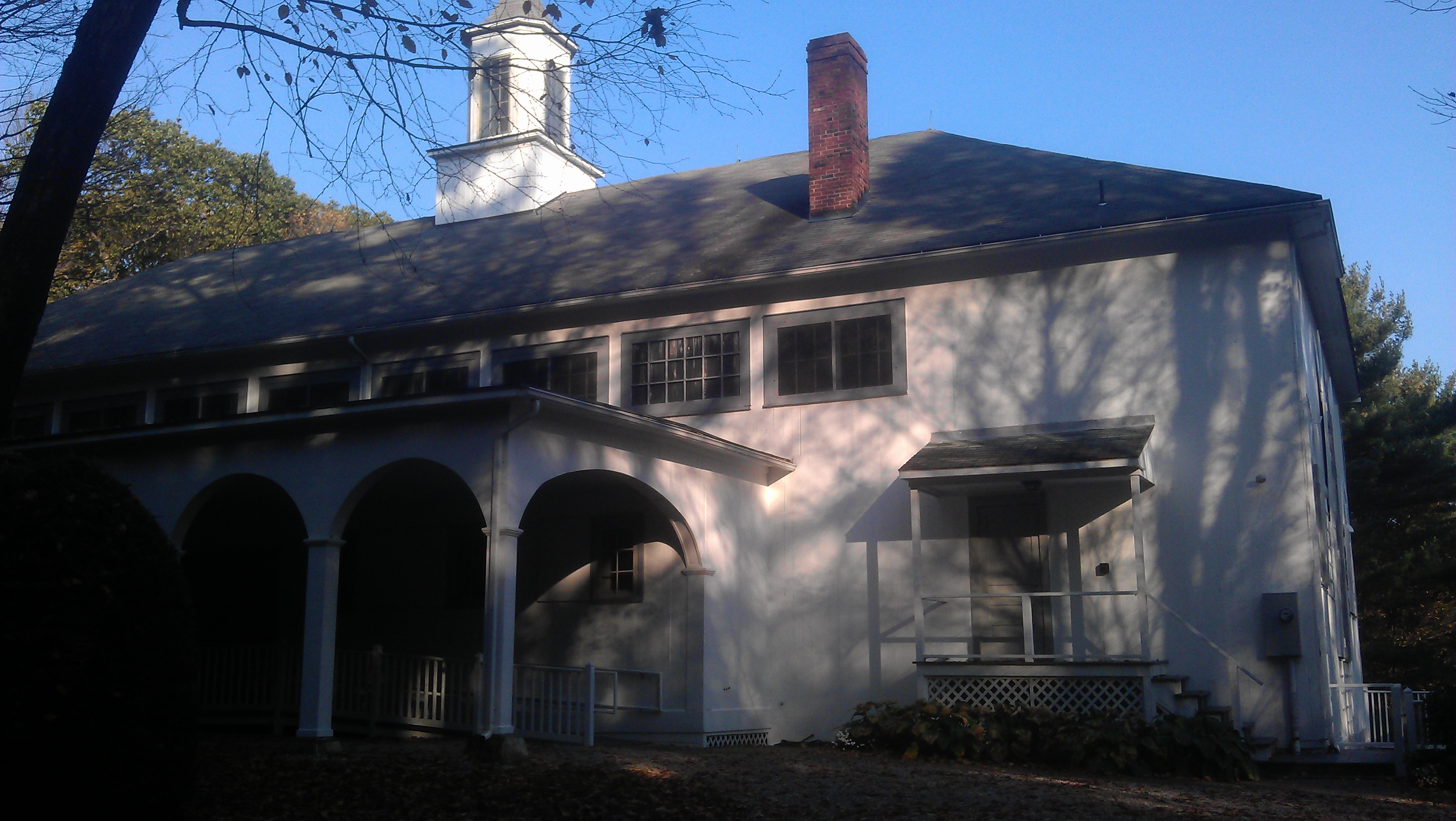

- Location within Massachusetts Location within the United States
- Location: New South Mountain Rd. (472 South St.), Pittsfield, Massachusetts
- Coordinates: 42°25′14″N 73°15′52″W
- Area: 10 acres (4.0 ha)
- Built: 1918
- NRHP reference No.: 73001943
- Added to NRHP: August 14, 1973

South Mountain Concert Hall is a historic performance hall on New South Mountain Road in Pittsfield, Massachusetts. Founded in 1918 by Chicago native Elizabeth Sprague Coolidge, it has been home to a classical music summer performance series since then, featuring name performers including Leonard Bernstein, Rudolf Serkin, and major chamber music ensembles. The hall was listed on the National Register of Historic Places in 1973, and the extensive estate grounds are open to the public as a nature preserve.

== History ==
South Mountain was founded in 1918 by Elizabeth Sprague Coolidge, who had moved to the Berkshires in a bid to improve her husband's health. A longtime supporter of chamber music, Mrs. Coolidge in 1916 established the Berkshire String Quartet, which at first gave concerts in her home. Two years later she had the performance hall built on her property that continues in use today.

The hall has played host to a large number of well-known classical music performers, including Peter Serkin, Leontyne Price, the Guarneri String Quartet, the Juilliard Quartet, and others. It has been the setting for world premiere performances of works by Bartók, Stravinsky, Ravel, and Schoenberg. The first complete cycle of the 24 chamber works of Johannes Brahms was given here in 1924.

== Setting and architecture ==
South Mountain is set on 200 acres (81 ha) of primarily woodland, formerly part of the Coolidge estate. The grounds are operated by the non-profit that manages the facility as a nature preserve open to the public on a year-round basis. The hall is a single-story timber-frame structure, built to resemble a church. It has a hip roof with a cupola, at the center, and a porte cochere at the main entrance on one of the long sides. The long side opposite the entrance has five bays, each of which is fitted with a French door, and there are casement-style windows above them for ventilation. The main timbers for the building were taken from an old textile mill, and the seats were pews taken from a church. The interior is finished with old wooden paneling. The hall is sited adjacent to an open lawn, from which the music can also be heard. In addition to the hall Mrs. Coolidge had cabins built to provide housing for performers.

== See also ==
- National Register of Historic Places listings in Berkshire County, Massachusetts
