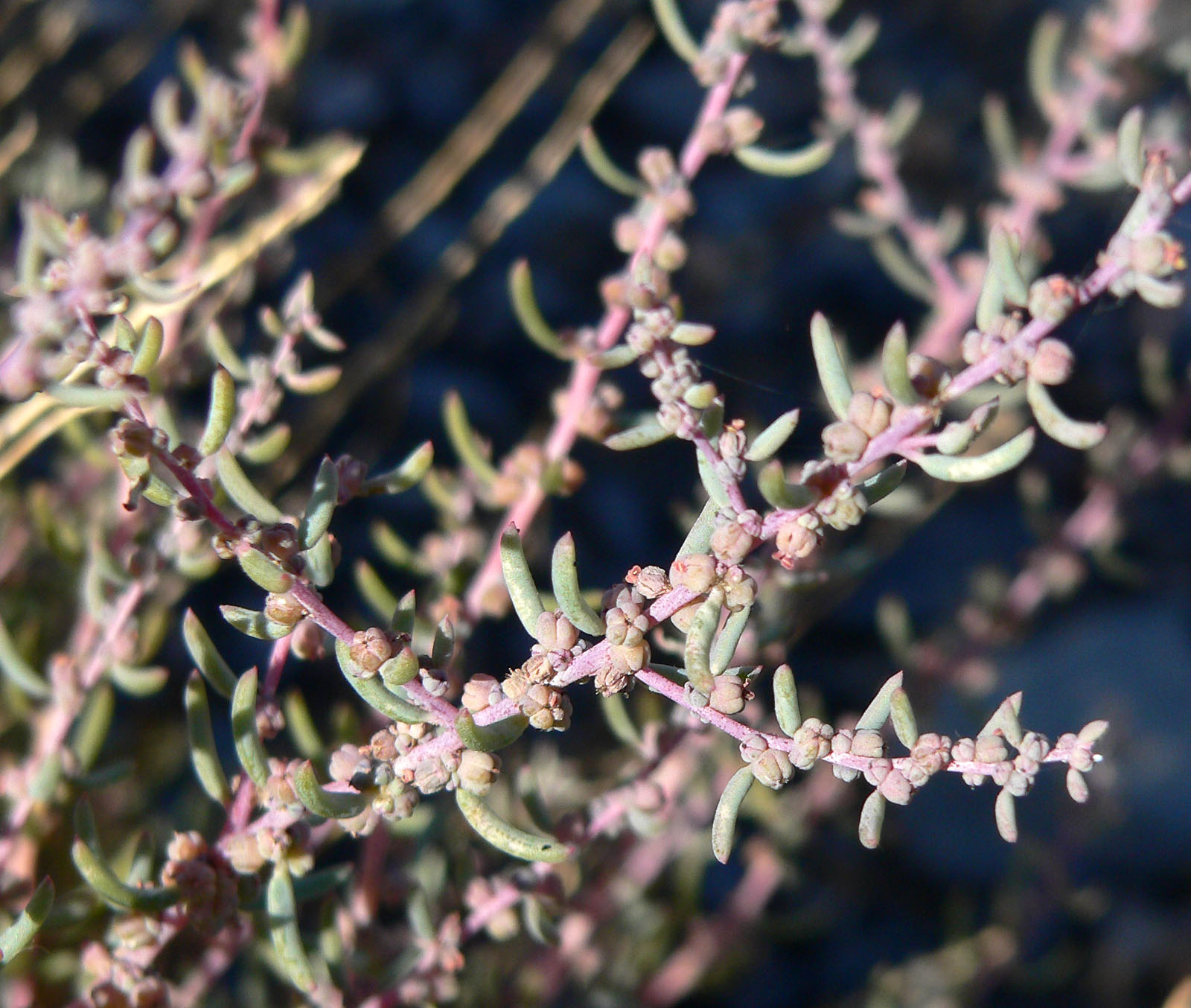
- Suaeda nigra

Scientific classification
- Kingdom: Plantae
- Clade: Tracheophytes
- Clade: Angiosperms
- Clade: Eudicots
- Order: Caryophyllales
- Family: Amaranthaceae
- Subfamily: Suaedoideae; Ulbr.

Genera
- about 2 genera, see text

= Suaedoideae =

Subfamily of flowering plants

The Suaedoideae are a subfamily of plants in the family Amaranthaceae (now including the former family Chenopodiaceae). These plants are characterized by well-developed leaves, which, except for the Bienertia genus, feature a central vascular bundle and numerous lateral bundles. Suaedoideae are found nearly worldwide and play a significant role in the vegetation of shorelines and salty inland habitats, particularly in arid regions. The subfamily includes both C3 and C4 plants, with C4 photosynthesis having originated independently four times within the group. Phylogenetic research divides Suaedoideae into two tribes: Bienertieae and Suaedeae.

== Description ==
The Suaedoideae have well-developed leaves. Except for genus Bienertia, the leaves show a central and many lateral vascular bundles. The leaves are neither decurrent nor amplexicaul.

The inflorescences are axillary cymes. The flowers are sitting free in the axils of bracts, with lateral bracteoles. The perianth consists of 5 tepals, which are more or less fused basally. 5 stamens are present. The seed encloses a spiral embryo, mostly without any perisperm.

== Distribution ==
The Suaedoideae have a nearly worldwide distribution. They are important members of the vegetation of shores and salty inland habitats. They are especially common in dry (arid) regions.

== Photosynthesis pathway ==
Among the species of Suaedoideae, there are nearly equal numbers of C_{3}-plants and C_{4}-plants. During the evolution of the subfamily, the C_{4}-photosynthesis pathway seems to have been derived from four independent origins: two times with Kranz C_{4} anatomy in Suaeda section Salsina and Suaeda section Schoberia. Two independent origins of non-Kranz C_{4} systems are found in Bienertia and Suaeda section Borszczowia. In these plants, the photosynthesis pathways are located without spatial separation in a "single cell C_{4}" type.

== Systematics ==
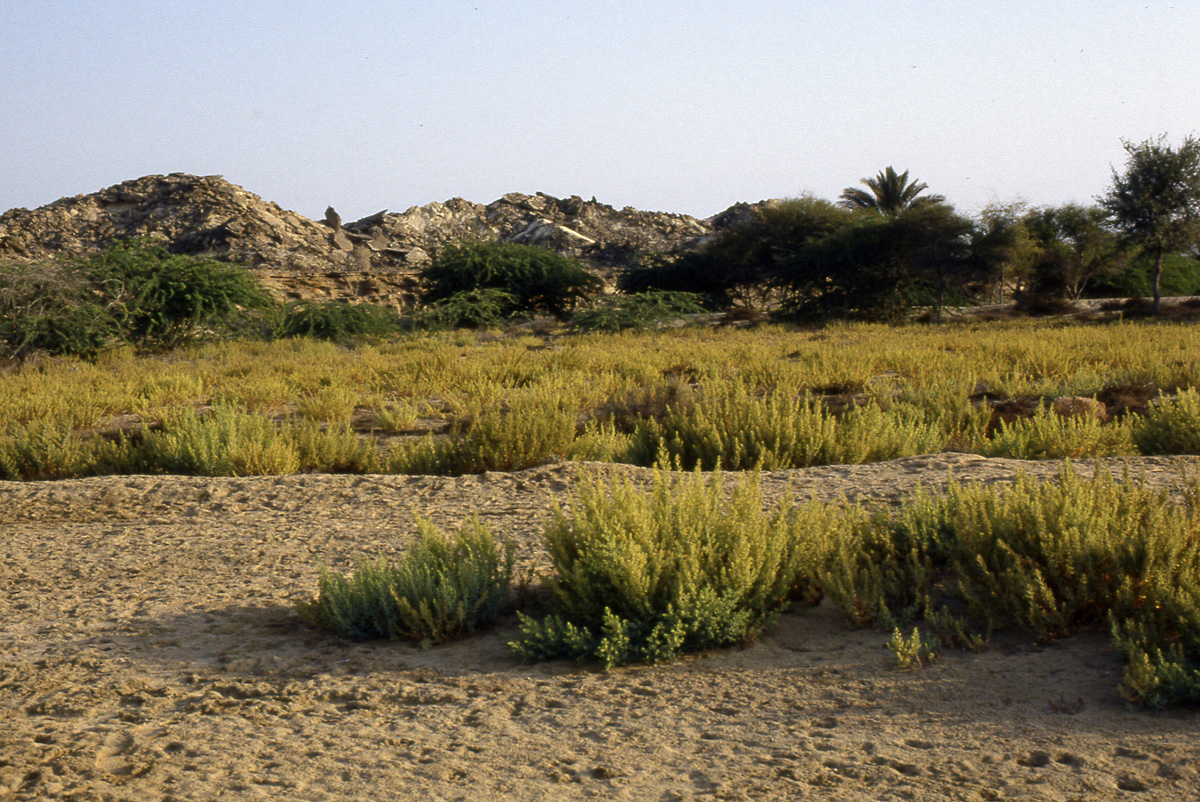
Habitat of Bienertia sinuspersici

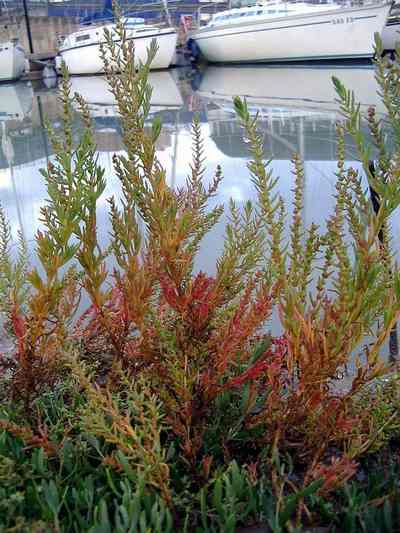
Suaeda maritima

According to phylogenetic research by Kapralov et al. (2006), the Suaedoideae are grouped in 2 tribes:

- Tribus Bienertieae Ulbr., with only one genus:
  - Bienertia Bunge ex Boiss., with 3 species:
    - Bienertia cycloptera Bunge ex Boiss.
    - Bienertia sinuspersici Akhani
    - Bienertia kavirense Akhani
- Tribus Suaedeae, with only one genus:
  - Suaeda Forssk. ex J.F.Gmel. (inclusive Alexandra Bunge and Borszczowia Bunge). With about 82 species, nearly worldwide. The genus can be further divided:
    - subgenus Brezia (Moq.) Freitag & Schütze
      - section Brezia (Moq.) Volk
    - subgenus Suaeda
      - section Alexandra (Bunge) Kapralow et al.
      - section Borszczowia (Bunge) Freitag & Schütze
      - section Physophora Iljin
      - section Salsina Moq. s.l. (sensu Schütze et al.)
      - section Schanginia (C.A.Meyer) Volk
      - section Schoberia (C.A.Meyer) Volk
      - section Suaeda

== See also ==
- Halophyte
