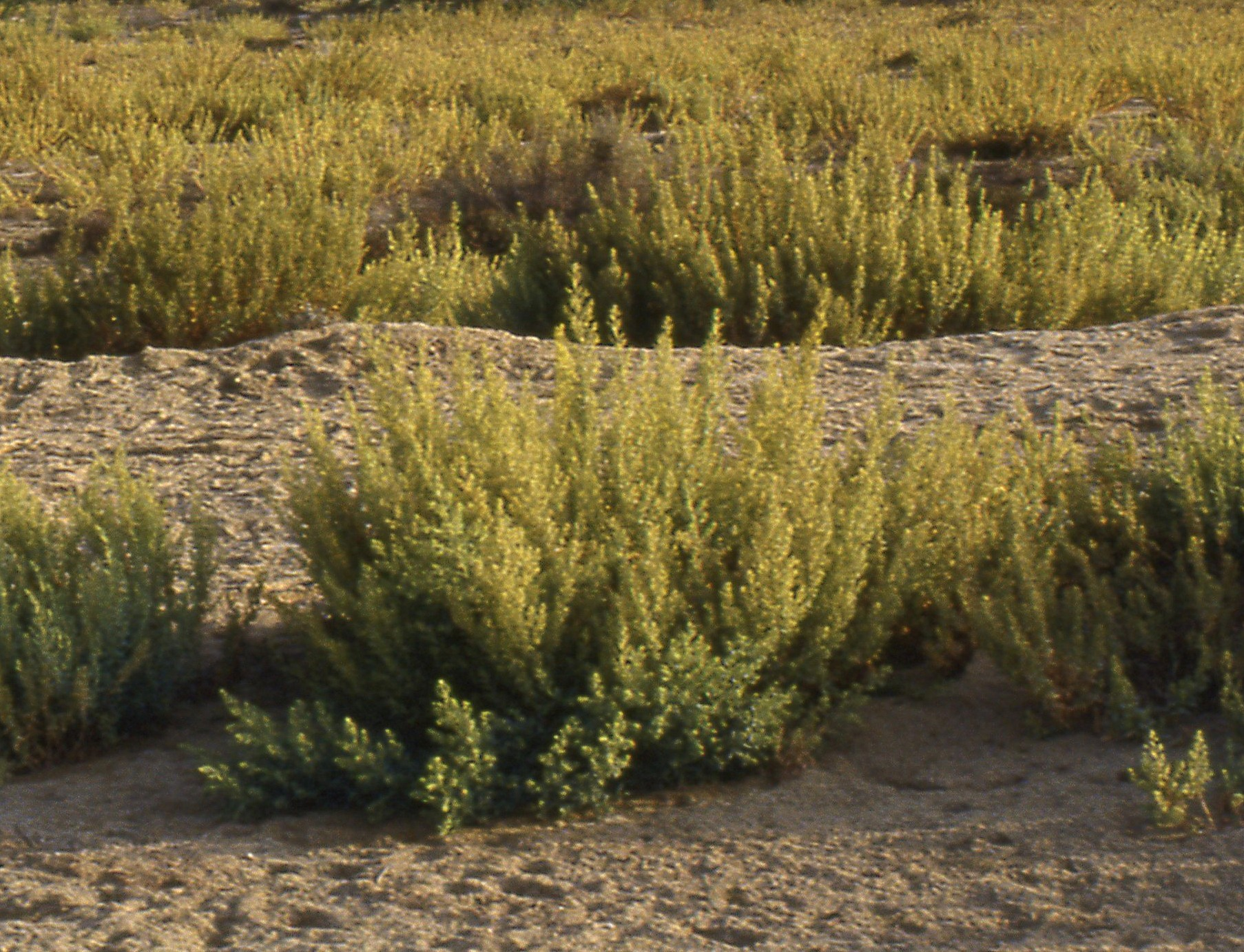
- Bienertia sinuspersici

Scientific classification
- Kingdom: Plantae
- Clade: Tracheophytes
- Clade: Angiosperms
- Clade: Eudicots
- Order: Caryophyllales
- Family: Amaranthaceae
- Genus: Bienertia
- Species: B. sinuspersici

Binomial name
- Bienertia sinuspersici Akhani

= Bienertia sinuspersici =

Species of succulent

Bienertia sinuspersici is a flowering plant that currently is classified in the family Amaranthaceae, although it was previously considered to belong to the family Chenopodiaceae.

Bienertia sinuspersici conducts C_{4} photosynthesis, but lacks the two cell types, bundle sheath and mesophyll cells, that are typical of Kranz anatomy in most C_{4} plants. Bienertia sinuspersici and three other former chenopods (Suaeda aralocaspica, Bienertia cycloptera, and Bienertia kavirense) instead conduct single-celled C_{4} photosynthesis within individual chlorenchyma cells. Single-celled C_{4} photosynthesis is achieved in Bienertia sinuspersici by the subcellular partitioning of dimorphic chloroplasts into two distinct cellular compartments, the central chloroplast compartment (CCC) and the peripheral chloroplast compartment (PCC).

Bienertia sinuspersici is native to countries surrounding the Persian Gulf: Iran, Iraq, the United Arab Emirates, Saudi Arabia, Qatar, and Kuwait. Bienertia Sinuspersici is a desert plant that is well adapted to growing in hot, dry, high salt environments.
