= Fritz Magg =

Fritz Magg (April 18, 1914 – July 20, 1997) was a renowned Austrian-American cellist, known for his career spanning over six decades as a soloist, symphony and chamber ensemble performer, and educator.

== Biography ==
Magg was born in Vienna to Paul Julius and Helene Magg. As a student, in the early to mid-1930s, he attended the Hochschule Für Musik, Cologne and the Hochschule Für Musik, Berlin, as well as the École Normale de Musique de Paris. His main teachers were Paul Grümmer, and Diran Alexanian. In 1934, he became the principal cellist with the Vienna Symphony Orchestra, but he left Europe four years later in 1938, after the Nazis invaded Austria. In the United States, he served in the US Army Air Force from 1943 to 1946. In addition to his military service, during his first decade in the United States he held the principal cello position with the Metropolitan Opera Orchestra, and joined the Gordon String Quartet, which continued as the Berkshire String Quartet after the loss of its founding member, violinist Jacques Gordon, in 1948. The newly renamed quartet was engaged at the Indiana University School of Music as the quartet in residence, and Magg became a member of the faculty, rising to become the chairman of the string department for 32 years, and a Professor Emeritus. After retirement, he continued his career as a visiting professor at the New England Conservatory and at the Hartt School of Music.

== Legacy ==
Fritz Magg is listed as an influence and teacher in the biographies of many modern cellists, and is the author of Cello Exercises: A Comprehensive Survey of Essential Cello Technique, published by G. Schirmer, Inc. in 1966. He also created a video teaching series called Cello Sounds of Today. Magg was awarded the American String Teachers Association Artist Teacher Award, posthumously, in 1998. Magg is the namesake of the 1698 cello by Antonio Stradivari which was in his provenance from 1956 until 1991.
