= Berkshire String Quartet =

The Berkshire String Quartet was an American classical chamber group founded and funded in 1916 at the height of World War I by Elizabeth Sprague Coolidge. The quartet, originally, was the Kortschak String Quartet, named for Hugo Kortschak (1884–1957), a member of the Chicago Symphony Orchestra from 1907 until 1914 (serving as assistant concertmaster from 1910 until 1914). Kortschak was a key figure in organizing the Berkshire Chamber Music Festival founded by Coolidge. The original Berkshire String Quartet disbanded sometime after 1941.

In July 1948, the successors of the Gordon Quartet were about to disband for a lack of funding and loss of its founder, Jacques Gordon (1897–1948), who had disbanded the quartet in 1947 due to ill health. Coolidge came to the rescue. She underwrote enough additional performances to make the quartet's summer season possible. But, according to Time magazine, Coolidge, for one of the few times in her life, asked a sentimental favor in return. "Would the quartet please call itself the Berkshire Quartet?" The quartet agreed and, at the urging of Wilfred Bain, moved its permanent residence to the Indiana University School of Music. The quartet continued to maintain its summer residence at Music Mountain, a hilltop near Falls Village, Connecticut, where, in 1930, Gordon had founded a Chamber Music Festival named after the hilltop.

== Former members ==
Founding members in 1916, in residence at Pittsfield, Massachusetts

- Hugo Kortschak (1884–1957) (first violin)
- Serge Kotlarsky (1893–1987) (second violin)
- Clarance Evans (viola)
- Emmeran Stoeber (1882–1945) (cello)

Other members at Pittsfield

- Hermann Julius Felber, Jr. ( –1892) (second violin, debut 1917) †
- Émile August Ferir (1873–1949) (viola)
- Edouard Dethier (1885–1962) †

† In 1917, Hermann Felber was drafted into the US Army; Edouard Dethier of New York played in his place.

Successor of the Gordon Quartet beginning in 1948, in residence at Indiana University and Music Mountain

Founding members in 1948

- Urico Rossi (1916–2001) (first violin), formerly a student of Kortschak
- Albert Lazan (1914–2003) (second violin)
- David Dawson ( –1975) (viola)
- Fritz Magg (1914–1997) (cello)

Other members after 1948

- Jerry Horner (1935–2019) (violist from 1975–1976)
- Paul Biss (viola)

== See also ==
- Zhanna Arshanskaya Dawson, David Dawson's wife
