= Hugo P. Kortschak =

Dr. Hugo Peter Kortschak
- Born: September 27, 1911; Chicago, Illinois
- Died: August 20, 1983 (aged 71); Honolulu, Hawaii
- Known for: Discovering the C4 pathway in 1957
- Spouse: Kate Leilani Kortschak
- Children: Alice M Kortschak; Nonnie Winifred Kortschak

Hugo Peter Kortschak (or Kortschack; 4 September 1911, in Chicago, Illinois – 20 August 1983) was an American biologist who discovered the C4 pathway in 1957. This pathway is an adaptation found in plants which reduces loss of energy via the inefficient C2 pathway. It is found in several plants, such as maize and sugarcane. The C4 pathway was rediscovered by Marshall Hatch and Roger Slack (to whom the discovery is sometimes wrongly credited).

In 1981 Kortschak, along with Hatch and Slack, won the Rank Prize in Nutrition for "outstanding work on the mechanism of photosynthesis which established the existence of an alternative pathway for the initial fixation of carbon dioxide in some important food plants".

He was the son of the Austrian-American violinist Hugo Kortschak, father of Alice M Kortschak and Nonnie Winifred Kortschak.

== See also ==
- C4 carbon fixation
- Photorespiration
- Biology
- Plant physiology
- Phytochemistry
