= PEP carboxylase =

PEP carboxylase may refer to:

- Phosphoenolpyruvate carboxylase, an enzyme
- Phosphoenolpyruvate carboxykinase (diphosphate), an enzyme
