= Roger Slack =

British-born plant scientist and biochemist (1937-2016)

Roger Slack FRS FRSNZ
- Born: Charles Roger Slack; 22 April 1937; Ashton-under-Lyne, Lancashire, England
- Died: 24 October 2016 (aged 79); Palmerston North, New Zealand
- Education: University of Nottingham
- Spouse: Pam Shaw (m. 1963)
- Children: 2
- Scientific career
- Fields: Plant biology and biochemistry
- Workplaces: Crop and Food Research
- Thesis: The role of boron in plant nutrition (1962)

Charles Roger Slack FRS FRSNZ (22 April 1937 – 24 October 2016) was a British-born plant biologist and biochemist who lived and worked in Australia (1962–1970) and New Zealand (1970–2000). In 1966, jointly with Marshall Hatch, he discovered C4 photosynthesis (also known as the Hatch Slack Pathway).

== Biography ==
Slack was born on 22 April 1937 in Ashton-under-Lyne, Lancashire, England; the first and only child of Albert and Eva Slack. He studied biochemistry at the University of Nottingham, where he graduated with a Bachelor of Science (Honours) in 1958, and a PhD in 1962. He married Pam Shaw in March 1963, and had two children.

From 1962, Slack worked as a biochemist at the David North Plant Research Centre in Brisbane, Queensland, Australia (funded by the Colonial Sugar Refining Co. Ltd). In 1970, he joined the Department of Scientific and Industrial Research in New Zealand. From 1989 until his retirement in 2000, Slack was a senior scientist at the newly formed Crown Research Institute for Crop & Food Research in Palmerston North.

Slack died in Palmerston North in 2016.

== Roger Slack Award ==
In 2007 the New Zealand Society of Plant Biologists renamed their annual award after Slack. The award is made to society members to recognise an outstanding contribution to the study of plant biology. It was renamed in recognition of his outstanding contribution as a plant biologist and biochemist in New Zealand, his role in the discovery of C4 photosynthesis (also known as the Hatch Slack Pathway), and his contribution as an early member of the New Zealand Society of Plant Biologists.

== Honours ==
- 1970: Peter Goldacre Award from the Australian Society of Plant Scientists (previously called the Australian Society of Plant Physiologists).
- 1980: Charles F Kettering Award from the American Society of Plant Physiologists, shared with Hugo Kortschak and Marshall (Hal) Davidson Hatch.
- 1981: Rank Prize for Nutrition, shared with Hugo Kortschak and Marshall (Hal) Davidson Hatch.
- 1983: Elected as a Fellow of the Royal Society of New Zealand.
- 1989: Elected as a Fellow of the Royal Society.

== Bibliography ==
Selected articles:

- Hatch MD, Slack CR (October 1966). "Photosynthesis by sugar-cane leaves. A new carboxylation reaction and the pathway of sugar formation". The Biochemical Journal. 101 (1): 103–11. doi:10.1042/bj1010103. PMC 1270070. PMID 5971771.
- Hatch MD, Slack CR (June 1970). "Photosynthetic CO2-fixation pathways". Annual Review of Plant Physiology. 21 (1): 141–62. doi:10.1146/annurev.pp.21.060170.001041.
- Roughan PG, Slack CR (June 1982). "Cellular Organization of Glycerolipid Metabolism". Annual Review of Plant Physiology. 33 (1): 97–132. doi:10.1146/annurev.pp.33.060182.000525.
