= Theophil Joachim Heinrich Bienert =

Baltic German botanist

Theophil Joachim Heinrich Bienert (3 May 1833 – 5 April 1873) was a Baltic German botanist who lived and worked mainly in Imperial Russia.

== Life and work ==
Theophil Joachim Heinrich Bienert was born in Kandava, in the Courland Governorate of the Russian Empire (present-day Latvia), and studied in Jelgava to become an apothecary. In 1858 he moved to Tartu in present-day Estonia and worked there as an assistant to the head of the Botanical Garden there. In 1858-59 he participated in the Russian Geographical Society's scientific expedition to Khorasan. He then stayed in Tartu until 1872, when he moved to Riga and took up a position at Riga Technical University. The genus Bienertia is named in honour of him by Alexander Bunge.

== Selected writings ==
- Baltische Flora, enthaltend die in Esth-, Liv- u. Kurland wildwachsenden Samenpflanzen u. höheren Sporenpflanzen (1872)
