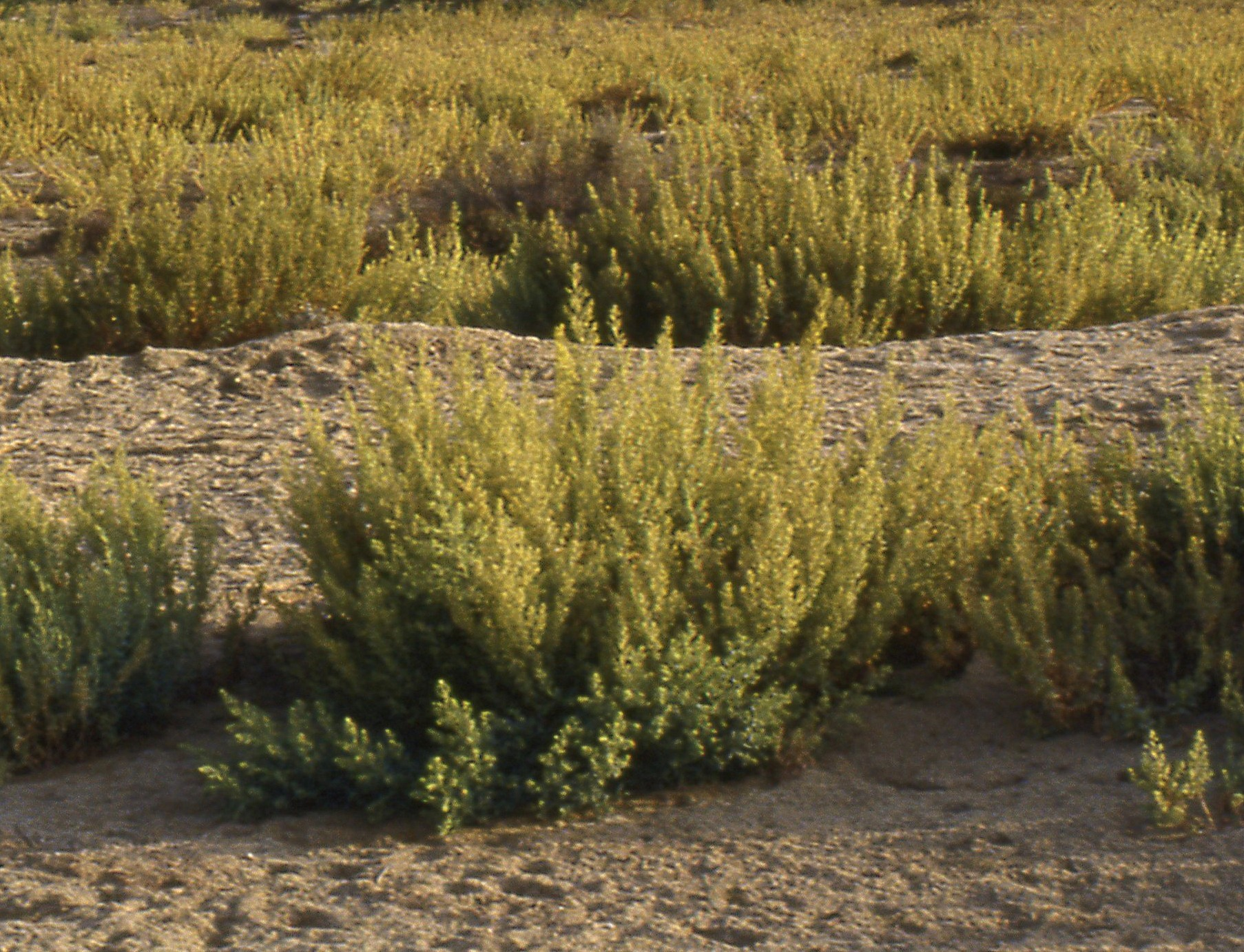
- Bienertia sinuspersici

Scientific classification
- Kingdom: Plantae
- Clade: Tracheophytes
- Clade: Angiosperms
- Clade: Eudicots
- Order: Caryophyllales
- Family: Amaranthaceae
- Subfamily: Suaedoideae
- Genus: Bienertia; Bunge ex Boiss. (1879)

Species
- 3 species, see text

= Bienertia =

Genus of plants in the amaranth family

Bienertia is a flowering plant genus that currently is classified in the family Amaranthaceae s.l. (including the family Chenopodiaceae). The genus is named after botanist Theophil Joachim Heinrich Bienert. For long time, the genus was considered to consist only of one species, Bienertia cycloptera, but in 2005 and 2012, two new species have been separated.

Species of this genus have acquired an unusual, single-cell type of C_{4} carbon fixation without Kranz anatomy, also found in some species of the closely related genus Suaeda.

== Species ==
Four species are accepted.

- Bienertia cycloptera Bunge – Turkey, Transcaucasus, Iran, Afghanistan, Pakistan, Turkmenistan, Kazakhstan, and southern European Russia
- Bienertia kavirense Akhani – Iran
- Bienertia przewalskii (Bunge) G.L.Chu – north-central China, Inner Mongolia, and Mongolia
- Bienertia sinuspersici Akhani – Iran, Iraq, Saudi Arabia, and the Persian Gulf states
