= Hugo Kortschak =

Austrian-born American violinist (1884–1957)

- Born: February 24, 1884; Goldwörth, Upper Austria, Austria
- Died: September 19, 1957 (aged 73); Honolulu, Hawaii, United States
- Citizenship: United States
- Occupation: Violinist
- Organization(s): Chicago Symphony Orchestra; Yale University; Manhattan School of Music
- Spouse: Alice Plaut (1884–1972)
- Children: Alice Kortschak (1909–1995); Hugo P. Kortschak (1911–1983)

Hugo Kortschak (February 28, 1884 – September 19, 1957) was an Austrian-born American violinist and a member of the Chicago Symphony Orchestra from 1907 until 1914 (serving as assistant concertmaster from 1910 until 1914), founding member of the Berkshire String Quartet and Dean of Music at Yale University. His son was the plant physiologist Hugo P. Kortschak.

The Berkshire String Quartet was founded when music patroness Elizabeth Sprague Coolidge persuaded Kortschak to move his quartet from Chicago to Pittsfield, Massachusetts, where its members could focus exclusively on chamber music. In his youth Kortschak was a member of the Pozniak-Trio founded by the Polish pianist Bronislaw Pozniak. Kortschak was an owner of several fine violins, including:

- In 1914: a Joseph Guarnerius violin, once the property of the Crown Treasurer of Spain; and
- Period of ownership unknown: Giuseppe Guarneri del Gesù, 1739c
- From 1925 to 1957: a 1698 Stradivarius violin, once owned by Joseph Joachim and later Joan Field

Kortschak was an influential teacher in Chicago, Illinois. Ruth Scott Miller, the first female music critic of the Chicago Tribune, studied violin with Kortschak between 1912 and 1915, first in Chicago and then Berlin. She credited Kortschak and conductor Frederick Stock for inspiring her to become a concert violinist. Kortschak was a key figure in organizing the Berkshire Chamber Music Festival founded by Coolidge. The original Berkshire String Quartet disbanded sometime after 1941.

== Honors ==
Kortschak is a recipient of the Elizabeth Sprague Coolidge Medal for "eminent services to chamber music."
