= Mannosyl-3-phosphoglycerate synthase =

Class of enzymes

Identifiers
- EC no.: 2.4.1.217
- CAS no.: 393512-63-5

Databases
- IntEnz: IntEnz view
- BRENDA: BRENDA entry
- ExPASy: NiceZyme view
- KEGG: KEGG entry
- MetaCyc: metabolic pathway
- PRIAM: profile
- PDB structures: RCSB PDB PDBe PDBsum
- Gene Ontology: AmiGO / QuickGO
Search
- PMC: articles
- PubMed: articles
- NCBI: proteins

Mannosyl-3-phosphoglycerate synthase (EC 2.4.1.217) is an enzyme that catalyzes the chemical reaction

3-phospho-D-glyceric acid
+ GDP-mannose
GDP
2-(α-D-mannosyl)-3-phosphoglyceric acid

The two substrates of this enzyme characterised from Pyrococcus horikoshii are 3-phospho-D-glyceric acid and GDP-mannose. Its products are 2-(α-D-mannosyl)-3-phosphoglyceric acid (mannosyl-3-phosphoglycerate) and guanosine diphosphate (GDP). In this thermophilic bacteria, the product has its phosphate group removed by hydrolysis by the enzyme mannosyl-3-phosphoglycerate phosphatase. This gives a compound, mannosylglycerate, which acts to protect against osmotic shock.

This enzyme belongs to the family of glycosyltransferases, specifically the hexosyltransferases. The systematic name of this enzyme class is GDP-mannose:3-phosphoglycerate 3-alpha-D-mannosyltransferase. This enzyme is also called MPG synthase.
