= Marshall Hatch =

Australian biochemist (born 1932)

Marshall (Hal) Davidson Hatch AM (born 24 December 1932) was an Australian biochemist and plant physiologist. He was the chief research scientist at the CSIRO Division of Plant Industry in Canberra. He is a Fellow of the Australian Academy of Science, a Fellow of the Royal Society, a Foreign Associate of the US National Academy of Sciences and was awarded Honorary Doctorates from the University of Göttingen and the University of Queensland. In Australia, in 1966, he elucidated, jointly with Charles Roger Slack, the C_{4} pathway for the fixation of carbon, which is also sometimes known as the Hatch-Slack pathway. He is now retired.

== Early life ==
Hatch was born in Perth, Western Australia to Alice (née Dalziell) and Lloyd Davidson Hatch. His father was an accountant and the family moved to Sydney in 1947. His primary education was at Applecross Primary School and he then had a year of high school at Wesley College before moving east. He was 14 when he commenced at Newington College where he completed the last four years (1947–1950) of his high school education. He was a member of the First XV Rugby team and won the State under 17 years mile championship at Newington. He then majored in biochemistry at the University of Sydney completing his BSc with Honours in 1954 and a PhD in 1959.

== Career ==
From 1955 to 1959 he was a plant research scientist at the Commonwealth Scientific and Industrial Research Organisation (CSIRO) in Sydney. He was awarded a Fulbright Fellowship in 1959 to work with Professor Paul Stumpf in the Department of Biochemistry at the University of California, Davis.

From 1961 to 1966 Hatch worked as research officer in the David North Plant Research Centre at Colonial Sugar Refining Co Ltd in Brisbane with K.T. Glasziou. He was a reader in botany at the University of Queensland in 1967; he returned to CSR from 1968 to 1969 serving as director of the David North Plant Research Centre. Since 1970 he has been chief research scientist at CSIRO Plant Industry in Canberra.

== Honours ==
- Centenary Medal in 2001 for service to Australian society and science in biochemistry and physiology.
- International Prize for Biology in 1991 for his contributions to the plant sciences.
- Member of the Order of Australia in 1981 for public service in the field of plant metabolism.
- Rank Prize in Nutrition in 1981, along with Hugo Kortschak and Roger Slack, for "outstanding work on the mechanism of photosynthesis which established the existence of an alternative pathway for the initial fixation of carbon dioxide in some important food plants".
- Lemberg Medal in 1974, Australian Society for Biochemistry and Molecular Biology

Awards
Preceded by Haddon King	Clarke Medal; 1973	Succeeded by Cecil Hugh Tyndale-Biscoe
