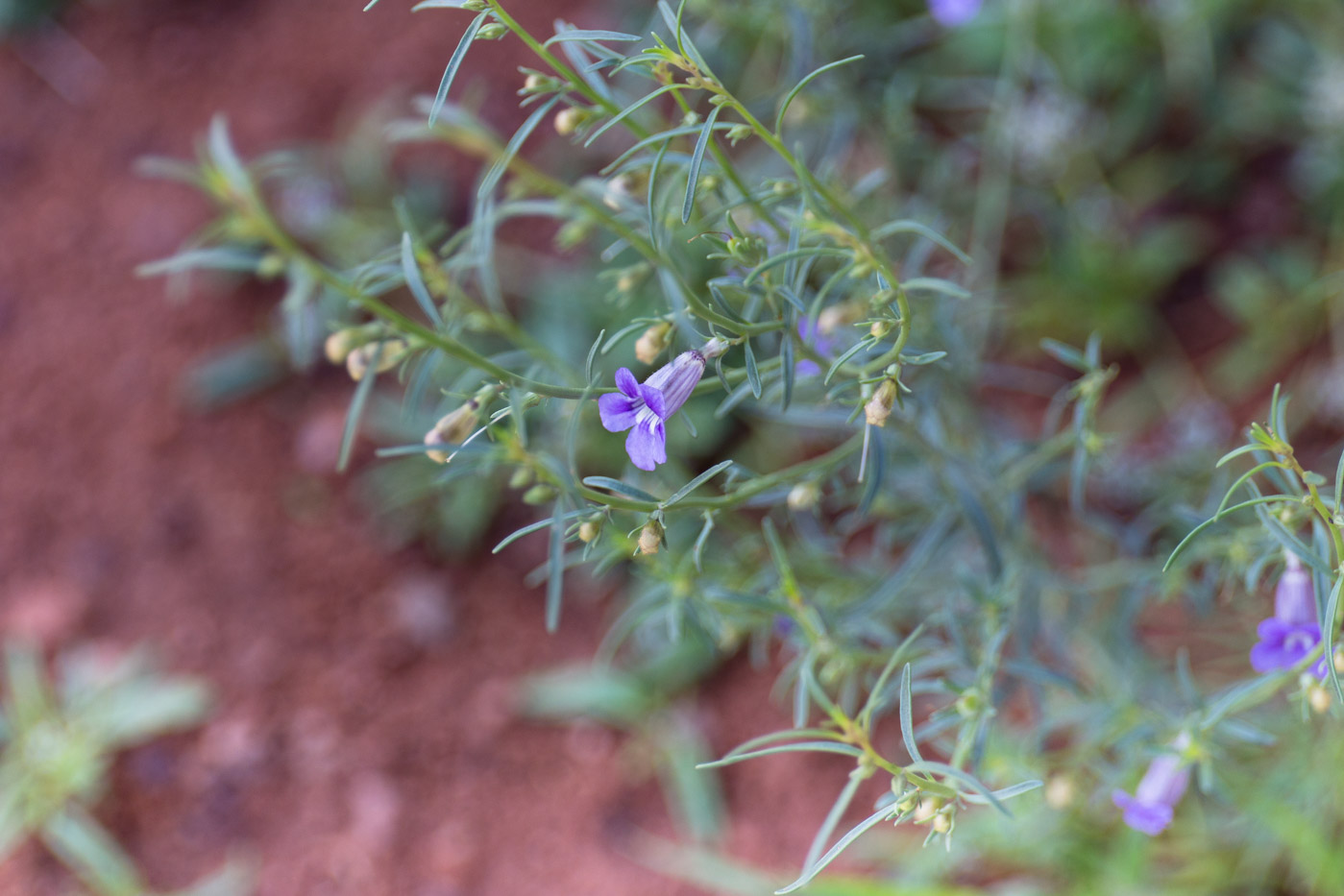
- Anticharis senegalensis

Scientific classification
- Kingdom: Plantae
- Clade: Tracheophytes
- Clade: Angiosperms
- Clade: Eudicots
- Clade: Asterids
- Order: Lamiales
- Family: Scrophulariaceae
- Genus: Anticharis; Endl.

= Anticharis =

Genus of flowering plants

Anticharis is a genus of flowering plants belonging to the family Scrophulariaceae.

Its native range is Africa to India.

Species:

- Anticharis angolensis B.Nord.
- Anticharis arabica Endl.
- Anticharis ebracteata Schinz
- Anticharis glandulosa Asch.
- Anticharis imbricata Schinz
- Anticharis inflata Marloth & Engl.
- Anticharis juncea L.Bolus
- Anticharis kaokoensis B.Nord.
- Anticharis namibensis B.Nord.
- Anticharis scoparia (E.Mey. ex Benth.) Hiern ex Schinz
- Anticharis senegalensis (Walp.) Bhandari
