= Ruth Scott Miller =

American music critic (1895–1984)

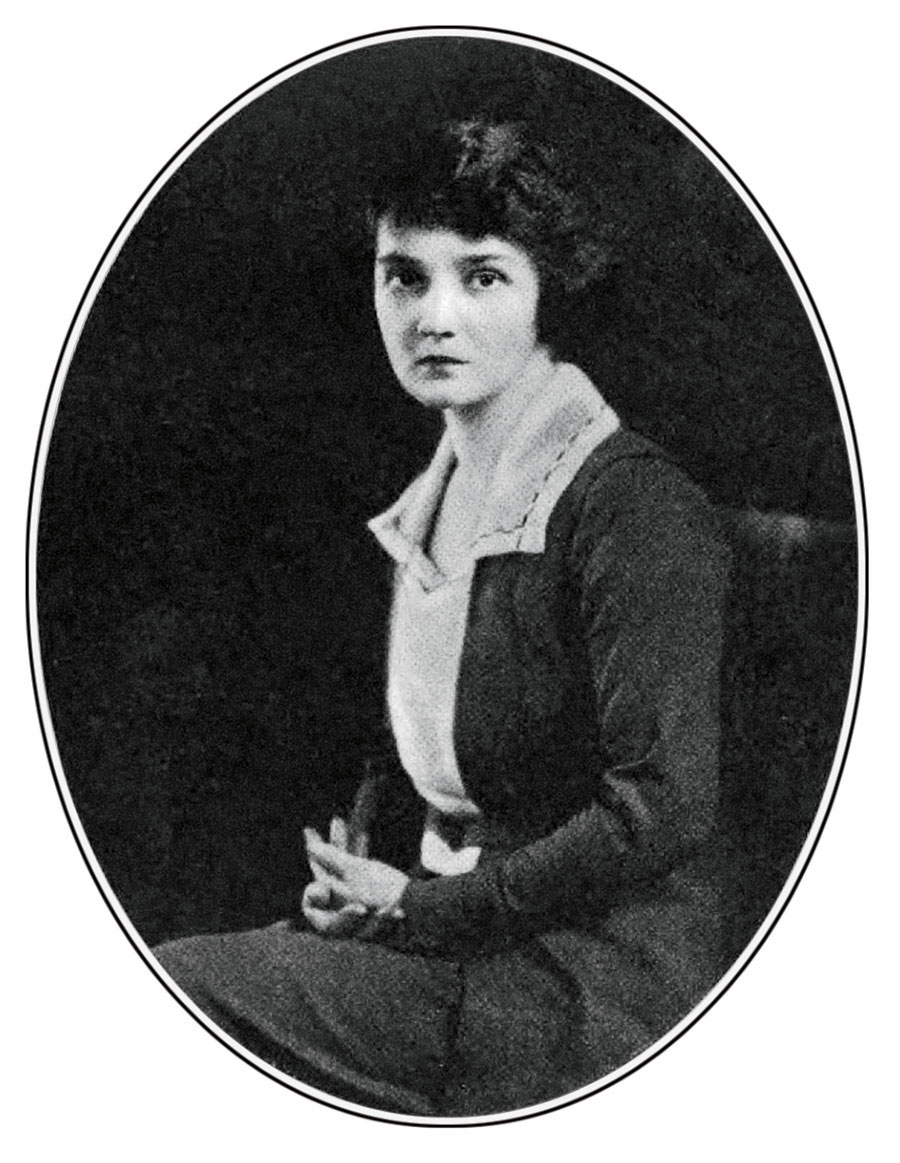
- Born: Ruth Johnson; June 19, 1895; Missouri, U.S.
- Died: September 14, 1984 (aged 89); Virginia, U.S.
- Occupations: Violinist; music critic; author; teacher

Ruth Scott Miller (née Johnson; June 19, 1895 – September 14, 1984) was an American music critic, violinist, author, and teacher. She served as music critic for the Chicago Tribune and contributed to other periodicals such as The Saturday Evening Post and Ladies' Home Journal.

== Early life and education ==
Ruth Johnson was born in Missouri to Pearl Makinson Johnson, who worked as a dressmaker. In 1902, when she was seven years old, Pearl married James W. Miller, a printer, and took his surname.

A 1916 newspaper article in the Topeka Daily Capital notes that Miller was raised in a musical family, which fostered her early musical education. Her stepfather James was the son of George W. Miller, a member of Marshall's Civic Band. James's sister, Ona Miller Briefer, was a harpist and singer.

Miller initially studied violin with Carlton Wood of Topeka. She learned counterpoint, harmony, and composition from Arthur Olaf Andersen of the American Conservatory of Music and Frederick Stock, music director of the Chicago Symphony Orchestra. In 1911, she furthered her violin studies in Chicago under the tutelage of Hugo Kortschak, assistant concertmaster of the Chicago Symphony Orchestra. Kortschak returned to his native Austria in 1912, and Miller traveled to his home in St. Veit to continue her studies with him, accompanied by her mother. She returned to the United States in 1913, hoping to visit Berlin in 1915 as a concert soloist. In 1915, she was named a student-artist soloist with the Chicago Symphony Orchestra season at Ravinia. Thereafter, she began teaching violin in Chicago at the Fine Arts Building.

In a self profile for the Ladies' Home Journal, Miller wrote that she dreamed of being a concert violinist from the age of eight: "Yearning to be a musician completely absorbed me for years. It ruled me to the exclusion of all else".

== Career ==
Miller was the first female music critic for the Chicago Tribune, writing for the paper from September 1920 to May 1921. Chicago historian and music critic Hannah Edgar points out the novelty and significance of Miller's position: she was the first woman to fill that role, at a time when it was nearly unheard of for women to write under their own bylines outside the society section. In the critical and historical survey Unsung: A History of Women in American Music, Christine Ammer underscores the problem of representation, noting that well into the 1970s "fewer than one-third of newspaper critics were women".

The editors of the Chicago Tribune noted that Miller came to their attention through her two articles about music in the Saturday Evening Post, "Our American Music Makers" (1919) and "Our Orchestral Americanization" (1920). She herself said that the Chicago Tribune "had a lot of readers and wanted a critic who could write for the masses and not for 'four or five thousand freak music lovers'. So I wrote for the masses and allowed the five thousand music lovers to scream themselves black in the face about it. How they did yell! Whew!" She would later downplay her time with the Tribune, referring to it as "pinch hitting", while simultaneously claiming that a number of readers thought she was "the best music critic the Tribune had ever had".

In a 1922 article, she references a broken shoulder that required the 1921–1922 musical season to heal. Thereafter, she moved to New York City. She continued to publish with the Saturday Evening Post and the Ladies' Home Journal. Focusing on education, she argued in 1923, "What the industry of music really needs is a widespread presentation of both sides of the artistic curtain, back stage [sic] as well as out front". Her articles advocate for professional music education for American youth in order to adequately prepare them for American orchestras, detailed in particular in "Cost of a Career" (1924) and in her support of the Civic Music Students' Orchestra of Chicago.

In March 1924, Miller moved to Sandwich, Massachusetts, and renovated a colonial-era home, which she profiled in a Saturday Evening Post article. She was named an honorary member of the Cape Cod Press Club in 1925. A trip to France in 1927 yielded the translation of A Century of Fashion by fashion designer Jean Philippe Worth.

Between 1925 and 1927, she published three pieces with the Ladies' Home Journal, one romantic short story about music titled "Jazz Enthroned" and two articles warning of the dangers of divorce and its links to child criminality.

Hannah Edgar believes that Miller's relationship to the editors at the Saturday Evening Post and the Ladies' Home Journal eventually became strained, with correspondence describing "an acrimonious falling-out, with one missive alluding to Miller's 'unfortunate attitude'". Edgar describes Miller's colorful correspondence, "slinging caps locks and underscores for emphasis". Nonetheless, she contributed to the Ladies' Home Journal until at least 1927. Her home in Sandwich was foreclosed on in 1934 due to delinquent tax payments. Edgar reports that Miller was evicted; she traced Miller's subsequent whereabouts to "the rear unit of a rental cottage" in Chincoteague, Virginia, where she was known as "a difficult tenant who owned a pack of unruly dogs". Miller lived in the cottage until her death in 1984.

== Publications ==
- Jean Philippe Worth. A Century of Fashion. Trans. Ruth Scott Miller. Boston: Little, Brown, and Co., 1928.

== See also ==
- Claudia Cassidy
