= Phosphoenolpyruvate carboxykinase (diphosphate) =

Class of enzymes

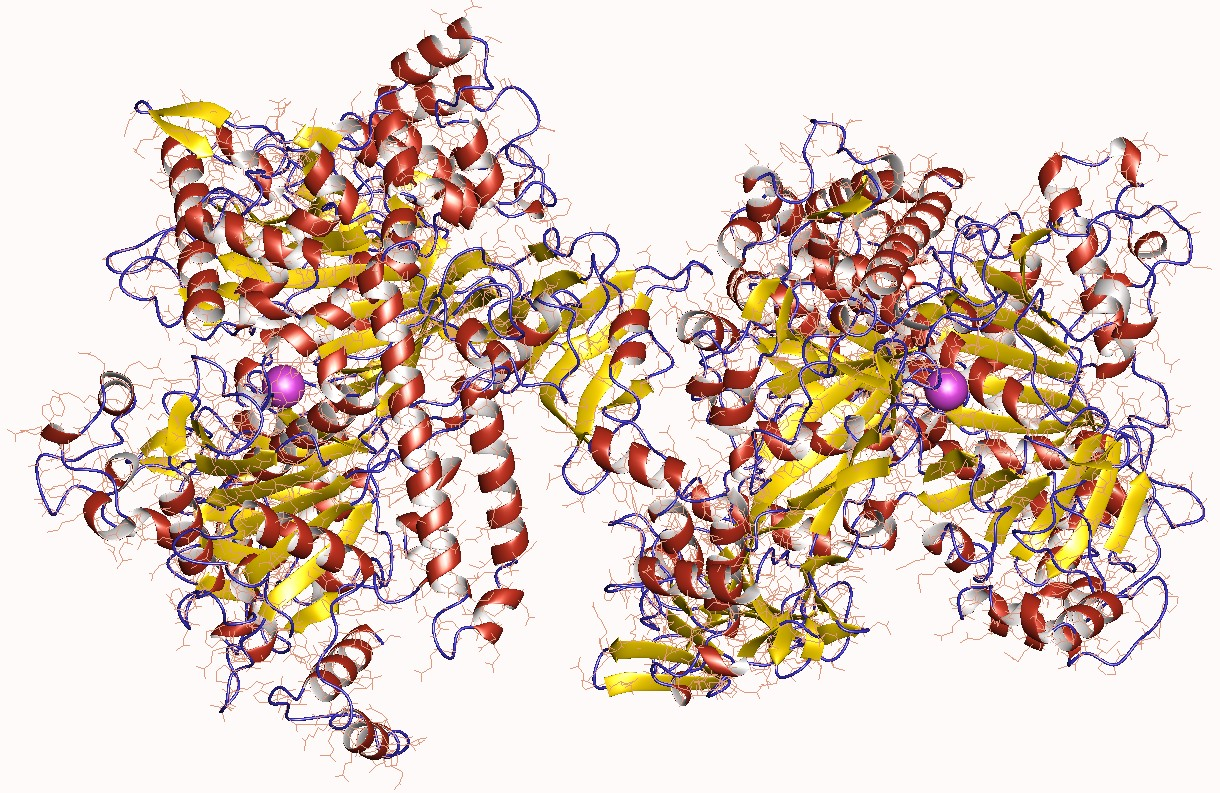
- Phosphoenolpyruvate carboxykinase (pyrophosphate) homodimer, Actinomyces israelii

Identifiers
- EC no.: 4.1.1.38
- CAS no.: 2598306

Databases
- BRENDA: enzyme data
- ExPASy: NiceZyme view
- KEGG: enzyme entry
- MetaCyc: metabolic pathway
- Rhea: reactions
- PDB structures: RCSB PDB PDBe PDBsum
Search
- PMC: articles
- PubMed: articles
- NCBI: proteins

Phosphoenolpyruvate carboxykinase (diphosphate) (EC 4.1.1.38), with the systematic name diphosphate:oxaloacetate carboxy-lyase (transphosphorylating; phosphoenolpyruvate-forming), is an enzyme characterised from Propionibacterium shermanii that catalyses a chemical reaction which converts oxaloacetic acid and pyrophosphate (PP_{i}) to phosphoenolpyruvic acid, carbon dioxide, and orthophosphate (P_{i}):

oxaloacetic acid
PP_{i}
CO_{2}
phosphoenolpyruvic acid
+ P_{i}

Phosphoenolpyruvate carboxykinase reactions like this one are reversible but in vivo often precede mainly in the forward direction (eg: phosphoenolpyruvate carboxykinase (ATP) in plants).
