= Phosphoglycerate =

Phosphoglycerate may refer to:

- 2-Phosphoglycerate
- 3-Phosphoglycerate
