= Mannosyl-3-phosphoglycerate phosphatase =

Identifiers
- EC no.: 3.1.3.70

Databases
- IntEnz: IntEnz view
- BRENDA: BRENDA entry
- ExPASy: NiceZyme view
- KEGG: KEGG entry
- MetaCyc: metabolic pathway
- PRIAM: profile
- PDB structures: RCSB PDB PDBe PDBsum
- Gene Ontology: AmiGO / QuickGO
Search
- PMC: articles
- PubMed: articles
- NCBI: proteins

The enzyme mannosyl-3-phosphoglycerate phosphatase (EC 3.1.3.70) catalyzes a chemical reaction which removes a phosphate group (P_{i}) by hydrolysis:

2-(α-D-mannosyl)-3-phosphoglyceric acid
H_{2}O
P_{i}
2-(α-D-mannosyl)-D-glyceric acid

The enzyme was characterised in the thermophilic bacteria, Pyrococcus horikoshii, and the product 2-(α-D-mannosyl)-D-glyceric acid (mannosylglycerate) helps prevent osmotic shock.

This enzyme belongs to the family of hydrolases, specifically those acting on phosphoric monoester bonds. The systematic name is 2-O-(α-D-mannosyl)-3-phosphoglycerate phosphohydrolase.

== Structural studies ==
As of late 2007, two structures have been solved for this class of enzymes, with PDB accession codes 1WZC and 1XVI.
