= Music Mountain Summer Chamber Music Festival =

American summer chamber music festival

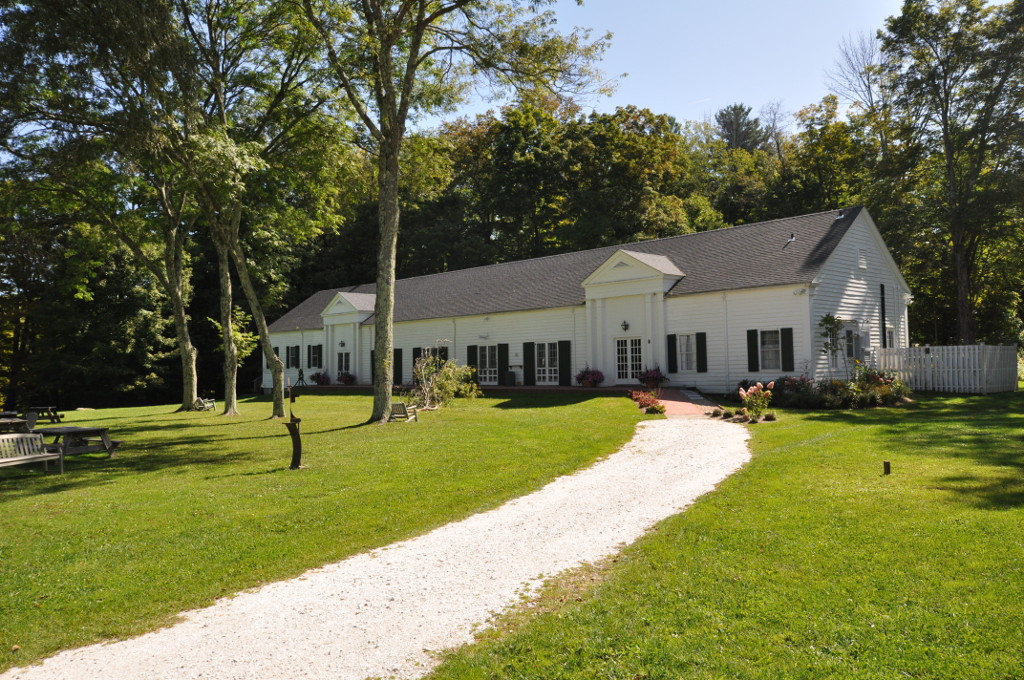
Gordon Hall

The Music Mountain Summer Chamber Music Festival, located on Music Mountain Road in Falls Village, Connecticut, is among America's oldest continuing summer chamber music festivals. Founded in 1930, it is currently in its 97th season, having survived the Great Depression, World War II, the early death of founder, Jacques Gordon, and most recently the coronavirus global pandemic when there were no concerts on Music Mountain, but online live-streamed concerts organized by artistic director Oskar Espina Ruiz.

== Mission ==
Music Mountain's original mission was to promote the teaching and performance of the string quartet literature. Its mission has grown to ensure that current and future generations experience the transformative power of music in an intimate and beautiful setting through broad offerings of live performances and educational experiences. The focus of the programs is on classical chamber music, in particular the string quartet, and on jazz.

== History ==
Music Mountain was founded in 1930 by the violinist Jacques Gordon as the permanent home for the Gordon String Quartet. Though chamber music, specifically the string quartet, is Music Mountain's focus, jazz and pop offerings were added in 1987. It is known for regularly programming world-famous artists. Music Mountain also offers a variety of teaching programs each season. Music Mountain's educational and artistic activities were overseen from 1975 until 2017 by Nicholas Gordon, son of founder Jacques Gordon. In 2016, Oskar Espina Ruiz, clarinetist, was named artistic director. Board member Ann M. McKinney was elected Interim President upon Nick Gordon's death in October, 2017.

There have been three string quartets that were in residence at Music Mountain each summer: the Gordon String Quartet (1930-1947), the Berkshire String Quartet (1948-1980), and the Manhattan String Quartet (1981-1988). Since 1989, there is a new quartet or chamber group each week.

Music Mountain is managed by a Board of Directors led by President Barbara von Bechtolsheim and Artistic and Executive Director, Oskar Espina Ruiz. Past Board Presidents have included Ann M. McKinney, David M. Conte, and Mike Abram.

== Premises ==
Music Mountain concerts take place in Gordon Hall, an acoustically stellar chamber music hall. Designed to be the analog of the violin, the beaming in the ceiling replicates the bass bar and sound post of the violin, the French doors mimic the f holes in the belly of the fiddle. The shape of Gordon Hall is similar to that of a violin, being long and narrow. The chamber itself is completely surrounded by air with hollow walls, a crawl space under the floor and above the ceiling. There is nothing to impede the ability of the walls, floor and ceiling to vibrate when music is played on the stage. There are approximately 350 seats in Gordon Hall. Outdoor seating is available on Sundays, with a popular concession stand offering beverages, snacks, and ice cream, with wine on Saturdays.

In addition to Gordon Hall, Music Mountain has 4 houses, each named after an instrument in the string quartet, all of which are prefabricated mail-order buildings from Sears, Roebuck & Co. and built in 1930. The property has been listed in the National Register of Historic Places for the impressive architecture of Gordon Hall, and for the relatively rare example of mail-order houses.

== Concerts ==
In the 2025 summer season, Music Mountain hosted 27 concerts, and additional community events. This included 8 concerts in the Saturday evening series - including big band and jazz. The remaining 19 concerts were part of Music Mountain's chamber/string quartet series, featuring Benjamin Hochman, the Balourdet, American, Euclid, Juilliard, and Arianna String Quartets, and more.

See also:

- National Register of Historic Places listings in Litchfield County, Connecticut
