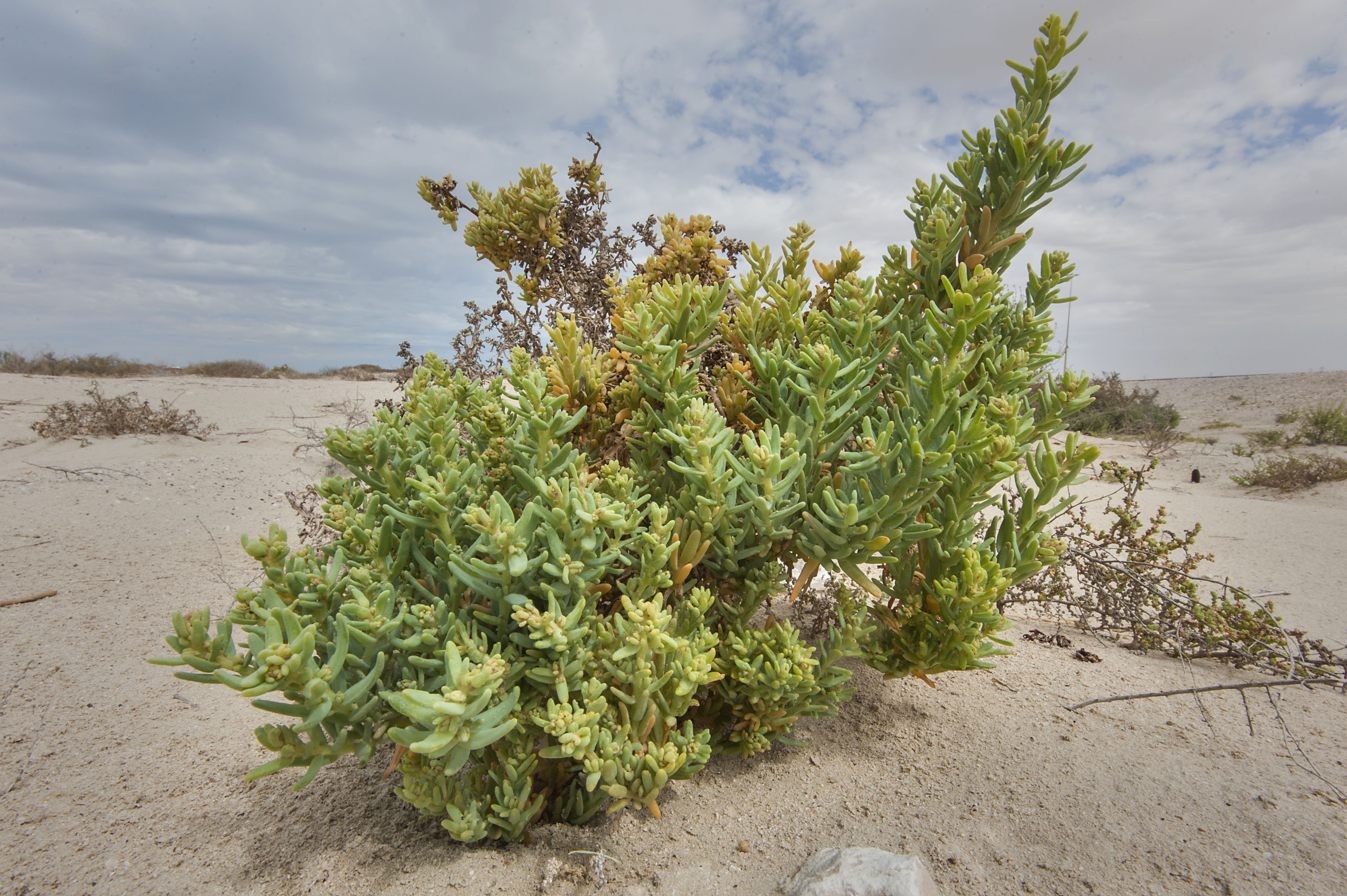
- Bienertia cycloptera

Scientific classification
- Kingdom: Plantae
- Clade: Tracheophytes
- Clade: Angiosperms
- Clade: Eudicots
- Order: Caryophyllales
- Family: Amaranthaceae
- Genus: Bienertia
- Species: B. cycloptera

Binomial name
- Bienertia cycloptera Bunge

= Bienertia cycloptera =

Species of flowering plant in the amaranth family

Bienertia cycloptera is a species of flowering plant that is native to the Middle East, south-eastern Europe, and central Asia. It is a succulent, smooth annual plant with long, curved, cylindrical leaves. Its flowers have both male and female reproducing parts and its fruits are small and spherical. Bienertia cycloptera grows in hot, dry climates with little rainfall and tolerates soils with high salinity levels very well. Due to its specific growing conditions, B. cycloptera is not a very common, nor widespread plant. Even over most of its range, it often grows sparsely in small patches of growth. One notable aspect of Bienertia cycloptera is its unique C4 photosynthesis mechanism. Unlike most C4 plants, in B. cycloptera the photosynthetic mechanism occurs within a single chlorenchyma cell, without Kranz anatomy.

== Distribution ==
Bienertia cycloptera is located throughout the Middle East, south-eastern Europe, and central Asia. The plant can be found in Armenia, Azerbaijan, Turkey, Iran, Pakistan, and Afghanistan. The range of Bienertia cycloptera throughout the Eurasian supercontinent covers an area from 24° to 49° N latitude and from 43° to 67° E longitude. It has an estimated range of 180 km^{2} (69 sq mi) in the Yerevan floristic region of Armenia, but occupies a mere 28 km^{2} (11 sq mi) of area. It fits the Deborah Rabinowitz's definition of a rare plant, even though it has a wide geographical range but low abundance where it is present.

== Habitat and ecology ==
Bienertia cycloptera grows in warm climates. It grows in regions where the hottest months have a daily temperature between 20 and 30 °C (68 and 86 °F), and annual precipitation ranges from 400 mm to 76 mm. Bienertia cycloptera tolerates saline and, temporarily, moist clay soils. The soils are rich in sodium ions and sulfate ions, with salinity ranging between 21 ds/m to 90 ds/m. In most habitats, Climacoptera turcomanica can be found alongside Bienertia cycloptera.

Bienertia cycloptera is an endangered species. Due to the historically saline soils of the Aarat Plain becoming more suitable for humans and therefore less saline, the B. cycloptera have not been able to regrow. It falls under Category 1 of endangered species according to the Red Data Book of Armenia. Conservation efforts have been underway with a protected population in the Vordan Karmir Reservation. These efforts include monitoring the remaining populations and searching for new habitats.

== Morphology ==
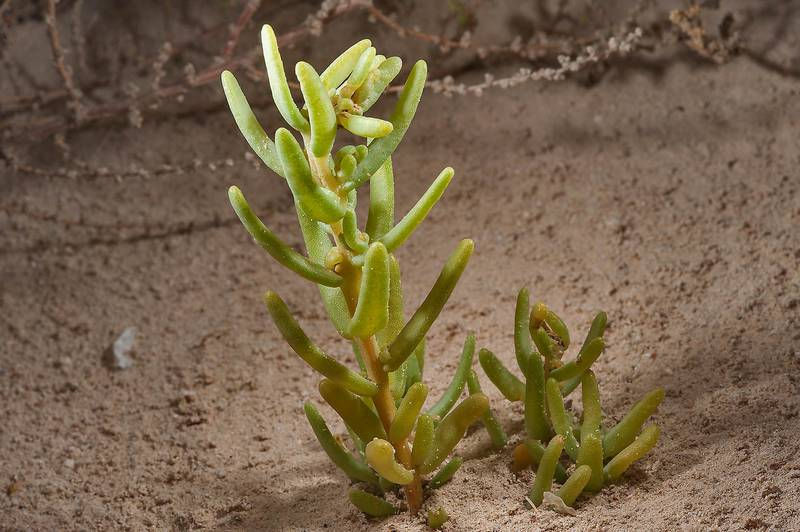
The cylindrical succulent-like leaves of the B. cycloptera plants are shown.

Bienertia cycloptera is characteristically a succulent, smooth, light green annual plant. It typically grows from 15 to 40 cm (5.9 to 16 in) in length. Habitually, the plant exists in a shrub-like form. They do not have an extensive branching pattern. The leaves are long, cylindrical, and curved. They are directly connected to the stem. They extend outwards. Since many B. cycloptera grow near each other, this pattern of leaves and the long stems lead to the shrub-like appearance of the plant.

== Flowers and fruit ==
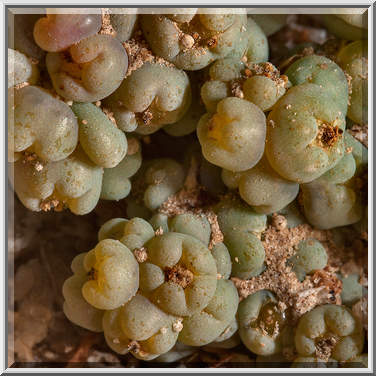
This shows the button-like fruits of Bienertia cycloptera

As a flower, Bienertia cycloptera produces both male and female flowers on the same plant, classifying as a monoecious plant. The fruits are shaped as small bubbles with a concave head. In its natural habitat, the plant germinates in the spring and then develops into the fall where reproductive growth happens via flowers. There are not enough pictures and research done on B. cycloptera's flowers and fruits that the distinction remains ambiguous.

== Medicinal use ==
In Persia, B. cycloptera is widely used for use in alternative medicine, especially for properties associated with antimicrobial, antihyperglycemic, and lipo catalytic properties. However, there is little scientific research showing evidence of this. A recent article that sought to rectify this lack of knowledge by testing B. cycloptera against different microbes and analyzing its lipid composition, finding a strong correlation with microbe reduction and a wide composition of lipids.

== Other significance ==
The plant B. cycloptera has a unique photosynthetic arrangement. As for the cellular structure of the plant, chlorenchyma cells have rubisco in the chloroplasts of the cell separated by channels and the PEPC in other cytoplasmic channels of the cell. This allows for the unique structure of the single celled C4 plant. This is a unique structure considering that every other C4 plants have spatial separation in the form of cells. However, scientists found evidence for this arrangement by measuring the carbon-13 isotope values and found it consistent with other C4 species.

In the field of scientific research for agriculture, B. cycloptera has been used as a subject for studying the potential changing of commercial crops from C3 to C4 photosynthetic plants. Studies on B. cycloptera have found that C4 photosynthetic cells are remarkably similar to that of C3 photosynthetic cells, hinting that genetic manipulation may require less anatomical change than previously thought.
