= Phosphoenolpyruvate carboxykinase (ATP) =

Class of enzymes

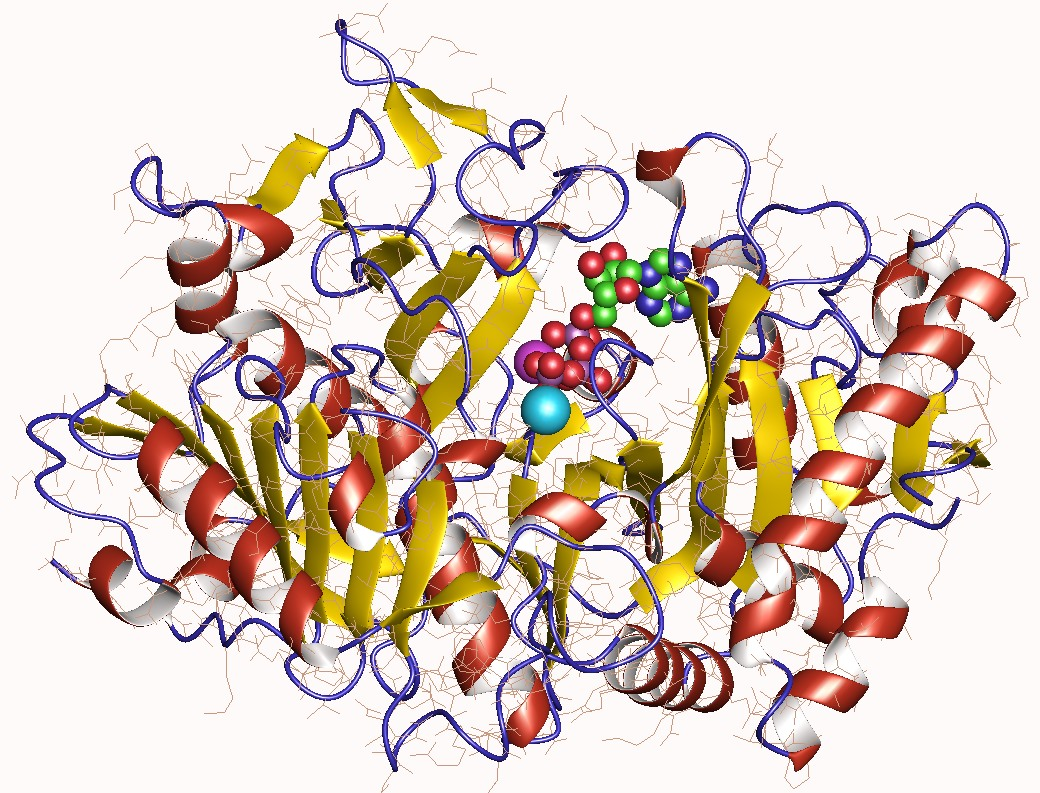
- Phosphoenolpyruvate carboxykinase (ATP) monomer, E.Coli

Identifiers
- EC no.: 4.1.1.49
- CAS no.: 9073-94-3

Databases
- BRENDA: enzyme data
- ExPASy: NiceZyme view
- KEGG: enzyme entry
- MetaCyc: metabolic pathway
- Rhea: reactions
- PDB structures: RCSB PDB PDBe PDBsum
Search
- PMC: articles
- PubMed: articles
- NCBI: proteins

Phosphoenolpyruvate carboxykinase (ATP) (EC 4.1.1.49, phosphopyruvate carboxylase (ATP), phosphoenolpyruvate carboxylase, phosphoenolpyruvate carboxykinase, phosphopyruvate carboxykinase (adenosine triphosphate), PEP carboxylase, PEP carboxykinase, PEPCK (ATP), PEPK, PEPCK, phosphoenolpyruvic carboxylase, phosphoenolpyruvic carboxykinase, phosphoenolpyruvate carboxylase (ATP), phosphopyruvate carboxykinase, ATP:oxaloacetate carboxy-lyase (transphosphorylating)) is an enzyme from baker's yeast with systematic name ATP:oxaloacetate carboxy-lyase (transphosphorylating; phosphoenolpyruvate-forming). It transfers a phosphate group from adenosine triphosphate (ATP) to convert oxaloacetic acid to phosphoenolpyruvic acid, with adenosine diphosphate (ADP) and carbon dioxide as byproducts:

oxaloacetic acid
ATP
ADP + CO_{2}
phosphoenolpyruvic acid

== Structural studies ==
The structure of the enzyme from Escherichia coli has been determined by X-ray crystallography.

== See also ==
- Phosphoenolpyruvate carboxykinase
