= List of Heliotropium species =

The following species in the flowering plant genus Heliotropium, the heliotropes, are accepted by Plants of the World Online. A number of species previously in Tournefortia were reassigned to Heliotropium in recent years as molecular methods became available.

== A ==
- Heliotropium abbreviatum Rusby
- Heliotropium acuminatum (A.DC.) Govaerts
- Heliotropium acutiflorum Kar. & Kir.
- Heliotropium adenogynum I.M.Johnst.
- Heliotropium aegyptiacum Lehm.
- Heliotropium agdense Bunge
- Heliotropium albiflorum Engl.
- Heliotropium albovillosum Riedl
- Heliotropium alii Y.J.Nasir
- Heliotropium ammophilum Craven
- Heliotropium amplexicaule Vahl
- Heliotropium anchusanthum Hiern
- Heliotropium angiospermum Murray
- Heliotropium angustiflorum (Ruiz & Pav.) Govaerts
- Heliotropium anomalum Hook. & Arn.
- Heliotropium antiatlanticum Emb.
- Heliotropium antioquianum J.I.M.Melo
- Heliotropium arbainense Fresen.
- Heliotropium arborescens L.
- Heliotropium arboreum (Blanco) Mabb.
- Heliotropium argenteum Willd. ex Lehm.
- Heliotropium arguzioides Kar. & Kir.
- Heliotropium asperrimum R.Br.
- Heliotropium astrotrichum (A.DC.) Govaerts
- Heliotropium aucheri DC.
- Heliotropium auro-argenteum (Killip) Govaerts
- Heliotropium azzanum O.Schwartz

== B ==
- Heliotropium bacciferum Forssk.
- Heliotropium balfourii Gürke
- Heliotropium baluchistanicum Kazmi
- Heliotropium benadirense Chiov.
- Heliotropium biannulatiforme Popov
- Heliotropium biannulatum Bunge
- Heliotropium biblianum Craven
- Heliotropium bogdanii Czukav.
- Heliotropium borasdjunense Rech.f.
- Heliotropium bovei Boiss.
- Heliotropium brevilimbe Boiss.
- Heliotropium brevilobatum (K.Krause) J.I.M.Melo
- Heliotropium bucharicum B.Fedtsch.
- Heliotropium buruense Craven

== C ==
- Heliotropium cabulicum Bunge
- Heliotropium calcareum Stocks
- Heliotropium caribaeum (Griseb.) Feuillet
- Heliotropium chaudharyanum Al-Turki, Omer & Ghafoor
- Heliotropium chenopodiaceum (DC.) Clos
- Heliotropium chorassanicum Bunge
- Heliotropium ciliatum Kaplan
- Heliotropium circinatum Griseb.
- Heliotropium confertiflorum Boiss. & Noë
- Heliotropium congestum Baker
- Heliotropium coriaceum Lehm.
- Heliotropium crassifolium Boiss.
- Heliotropium crispatum F.Muell. ex Benth.
- Heliotropium crispum Desf.
- Heliotropium curassavicum L.
- Heliotropium cuspidatum (Kunth) Feuillet

== D ==
- Heliotropium dasycarpum Ledeb.
- Heliotropium dentatum Balf.f.
- Heliotropium denticulatum Boiss. & Hausskn.
- Heliotropium derafontense Vierh.
- Heliotropium dicricophorum Rech.f. & Riedl
- Heliotropium digynum (Forssk.) Asch. ex C.Chr.
- Heliotropium disciforme Akhani
- Heliotropium dissitiflorum Boiss.
- Heliotropium distantiflorum Hassl. ex I.M.Johnst.
- Heliotropium dolosum De Not.

== E ==
- Heliotropium earlei (Britton) Greuter, P.A.González & R.Rankin
- Heliotropium ellipticum Ledeb.
- Heliotropium elongatum (Lehm.) Gürke
- Heliotropium eremobium Bunge
- Heliotropium eremogenum I.M.Johnst.
- Heliotropium erianthum I.M.Johnst.
- Heliotropium eritrichioides Kotschy
- Heliotropium esfahanicum Khat.
- Heliotropium esfandiarii Akhani & Riedl
- Heliotropium europaeum L.

== F ==
- Heliotropium fedtschenkoanum Popov
- Heliotropium ferrugineogriseum Nábělek
- Heliotropium filiflorum (Griseb.) Feuillet
- Heliotropium filifolium (Miers) I.M.Johnst.
- Heliotropium floridum Clos
- Heliotropium foetidissimum (L.) Feuillet
- Heliotropium formosanum I.M.Johnst.
- Heliotropium fragillimum Rech.f.
- Heliotropium fuliginosum (Kunth) J.I.M.Melo

== G ==
- Heliotropium gaubae Riedl
- Heliotropium geissei F.Phil. ex Phil.
- Heliotropium genovefae I.M.Johnst.
- Heliotropium gibberosum (Urb.) Feuillet
- Heliotropium giessii Friedr.-Holzh.
- Heliotropium gigantifolium (Killip ex J.S.Mill.) J.I.M.Melo
- Heliotropium gillianum (Riedl) Kazmi
- Heliotropium glabriusculum A.Gray
- Heliotropium glabrum (L.) Feuillet
- Heliotropium glutinosum Phil.
- Heliotropium gossypii Ponert
- Heliotropium gracilipes (I.M.Johnst.) J.I.M.Melo
- Heliotropium gracillimum Bunge
- Heliotropium grande Popov
- Heliotropium greuteri Riedl
- Heliotropium griffithii Boiss.
- Heliotropium gypsaceum Rech.f. & Riedl

== H ==
- Heliotropium halacsyi Riedl
- Heliotropium halame Boiss. & Buhse
- Heliotropium harareense E.S.Martins
- Heliotropium haussknechtii Bunge
- Heliotropium hirsutissimum Weber

== I ==
- Heliotropium incanum Ruiz & Pav.
- Heliotropium inconspicuum Reiche
- Heliotropium indicum L.

== J ==
- Heliotropium jaffiuelii I.M.Johnst.
- Heliotropium jizanense Al-Turki, Omer & Ghafoor
- Heliotropium johnstonii Ragonese

== K ==
- Heliotropium kaserunense Bornm.
- Heliotropium kavirense Riedl
- Heliotropium keralense Sivar. & Manilal
- Heliotropium khayyamii Akhani
- Heliotropium krauseanum Fedde
- Heliotropium kumense Bunge
- Heliotropium kuriense Vierh.
- Heliotropium kurtzii Gangui

== L ==
- Heliotropium laevigatum (Lam.) Feuillet
- Heliotropium lamarckii Feuillet
- Heliotropium lamondiae Kazmi
- Heliotropium lanceolatum Ruiz & Pav.
- Heliotropium laricum Bornm.
- Heliotropium lasianthum Riedl
- Heliotropium lasiocarpum Fisch. & C.A.Mey.
- Heliotropium leiocarpum Morong
- Heliotropium lilloi (I.M.Johnst.) Luebert
- Heliotropium linariifolium Phil.
- Heliotropium lineare (DC.) Gürke
- Heliotropium lippioides K.Krause
- Heliotropium litvinovii Popov
- Heliotropium longicalyx Rech.f.
- Heliotropium longiflorum (A.DC.) Jaub. & Spach
- Heliotropium longistylum Phil.
- Heliotropium luteoviride Rech.f. & Riedl
- Heliotropium luzonicum (I.M.Johnst.) Craven

== M ==
- Heliotropium macrodon (Fresen.) Gürke
- Heliotropium macrolimbe Riedl
- Heliotropium macrostachyum (DC.) Hemsl.
- Heliotropium magistri Raenko
- Heliotropium makranicum Rech.f. & Esfand.
- Heliotropium mamanense Bunge
- Heliotropium mandonii I.M.Johnst.
- Heliotropium maranjonense Luebert & Weigend
- Heliotropium maris-mortui Zohary
- Heliotropium megalanthum I.M.Johnst.
- Heliotropium melanochaeta (A.DC.) Feuillet
- Heliotropium mesinanum Bunge
- Heliotropium messerschmidioides Kuntze
- Heliotropium micranthos (Pall.) Bunge
- Heliotropium microspermum E.J.Thomps.
- Heliotropium microstachyum Ruiz & Pav.
- Heliotropium minutiflorum Bunge
- Heliotropium molle (Torr.) I.M.Johnst.
- Heliotropium muelleri (I.M.Johnst.) Craven
- Heliotropium murinum Craven
- Heliotropium myosotifolium (DC.) Reiche
- Heliotropium myosotoides Banks & Sol.

== N ==
- Heliotropium nicotianifolium Poir.
- Heliotropium nodulosum Rech.f., Aellen & Esfand.
- Heliotropium noeanum Boiss.

== O ==
- Heliotropium olgae Bunge
- Heliotropium oliganthum Rech.f., Aellen & Esfand.
- Heliotropium oliverianum Schinz
- Heliotropium ophioglossum Stocks ex Boiss.
- Heliotropium oxapampanum Luebert & Weigend

== P ==
- Heliotropium pamparomasense Luebert & Weigend
- Heliotropium pannifolium Burch. ex Hemsl.
- Heliotropium paronychioides DC.
- Heliotropium parvulum Popov
- Heliotropium patagonicum (Speg.) I.M.Johnst.
- Heliotropium paulayanum Vierh.
- Heliotropium petiolare (A.DC.) Govaerts
- Heliotropium philippianum I.M.Johnst.
- Heliotropium phylicoides Cham.
- Heliotropium pileiforme Czukav.
- Heliotropium pinnatisectum Pérez-Mor.
- Heliotropium pleiopterum F.Muell.
- Heliotropium popovii Riedl
- Heliotropium pseudoindicum H.Chuang
- Heliotropium pterocarpum (DC.) Hochst. & Steud. ex Bunge
- Heliotropium pueblense Standl.
- Heliotropium pycnophyllum Phil.

== R ==
- Heliotropium ramosissimum (Lehm.) Sieber ex DC.
- Heliotropium rechingeri Riedl
- Heliotropium remotiflorum Rech.f. & Riedl
- Heliotropium riebeckii Schweinf. & Vierh.
- Heliotropium riedlii Craven
- Heliotropium roigii (Britton) Feuillet
- Heliotropium rollotii (Killip) J.I.M.Melo
- Heliotropium romeroi (I.M.Johnst.) J.I.M.Melo
- Heliotropium rotundifolium Sieber ex Lehm.
- Heliotropium rudbaricum (Bornm.) Riedl
- Heliotropium rufipilum (Benth.) I.M.Johnst.
- Heliotropium ruhanyi Riedl & Esfand.
- Heliotropium ruiz-lealii I.M.Johnst.
- Heliotropium rusbyi Govaerts

== S ==
- Heliotropium samoliflorum Bunge
- Heliotropium saonae Alain
- Heliotropium sarmentosum (Lam.) Craven
- Heliotropium scabridum (Kunth) J.I.M.Melo
- Heliotropium schahpurense Bornm.
- Heliotropium schreiteri I.M.Johnst.
- Heliotropium schweinfurthii Boiss.
- Heliotropium scotteae Rendle
- Heliotropium seravschanicum Popov
- Heliotropium serpentinicum Rech.f.
- Heliotropium shirazicum Mozaff. ex Negaresh
- Heliotropium shoabense Vierh.
- Heliotropium sibiricum (L.) J.I.M.Melo
- Heliotropium simile Vatke
- Heliotropium sinuatum (Miers) I.M.Johnst.
- Heliotropium smaragdinum (Proctor) Feuillet
- Heliotropium sogdianum Bunge
- Heliotropium sokotranum Vierh.
- Heliotropium stamineum (Griseb.) Feuillet
- Heliotropium stapfianum J.I.M.Melo
- Heliotropium stenophyllum Hook. & Arn.
- Heliotropium steudneri Vatke
- Heliotropium stevenianum Andrz.
- Heliotropium styligerum Trautv.
- Heliotropium suaveolens M.Bieb.
- Heliotropium submolle Klotzsch
- Heliotropium subspinosum Thulin & A.G.Mill.
- Heliotropium sudanicum F.W.Andrews
- Heliotropium sultanense Bunge
- Heliotropium supinum L.
- Heliotropium szovitsii (Steven) Stschegl.

== T ==
- Heliotropium taftanicum Rech.f., Aellen & Esfand.
- Heliotropium taltalense (Phil.) I.M.Johnst.
- Heliotropium thermophilum Kit Tan, A.Çelik & Gemici
- Heliotropium tiaridioides Cham.
- Heliotropium transalpinum Vell.
- Heliotropium trichostomum Bunge
- Heliotropium tubulosum E.Mey. ex DC.
- Heliotropium tzvelevii T.N.Popova

== U ==
- Heliotropium ulei (Vaupel) Feuillet
- Heliotropium ulophyllum Rech.f. & Riedl

== V ==
- Heliotropium velutinum (Sm.) Govaerts
- Heliotropium verdcourtii Craven
- Heliotropium veronicifolium Griseb.
- Heliotropium viridiflorum Lehm.

== W ==
- Heliotropium wagneri Vierh.
- Heliotropium wissmannii O.Schwartz

== Z ==
- Heliotropium zeylanicum (Burm.f.) Lam.
- Heliotropium ziegleri Akhani
