= Heliotropium aff. wagneri =

Conservation status
- Vulnerable (IUCN 3.1)

Scientific classification
- Kingdom: Plantae
- Clade: Tracheophytes
- Clade: Angiosperms
- Clade: Eudicots
- Clade: Asterids
- Order: Boraginales
- Family: Heliotropiaceae
- Genus: Heliotropium
- Species: H. aff. wagneri

Binomial name
- Heliotropium aff. wagneri

Species of flowering plant

Heliotropium aff. wagneri is an undescribed plant in the family Heliotropiaceae. It resembles Heliotropium wagneri, but differs in fruits breaking up into four nutlets and flowers that are always yellow, never white.

Endemic to Samhah in Yemen, its natural habitats are subtropical or tropical dry lowland grassland and rocky shores.
