= Heliotropium aegyptiacum =

Scientific classification
- Kingdom: Plantae
- Clade: Tracheophytes
- Clade: Angiosperms
- Clade: Eudicots
- Clade: Asterids
- Order: Boraginales
- Family: Heliotropiaceae
- Genus: Heliotropium
- Species: H. aegyptiacum

Binomial name
- Heliotropium aegyptiacum Lehm.

Synonyms
- Heliotropium cimaliense Vierh.; Heliotropium cinerascens Steud. ex DC.; Heliotropium ellipticum R.Br.; Heliotropium pallens Delile

Species of plant in the borage family

Heliotropium aegyptiacum is a species of flowering plant in the family Heliotropiaceae. It is native to Egypt, northwest tropical Africa, Socotra, Kenya, and the Arabian Peninsula. It is favored by desert locusts (Schistocerca gregaria), but is toxic to livestock.
