= Heliotropium anderssonii =

Conservation status
- Vulnerable (IUCN 2.3)

Scientific classification
- Kingdom: Plantae
- Clade: Tracheophytes
- Clade: Angiosperms
- Clade: Eudicots
- Clade: Asterids
- Order: Boraginales
- Family: Heliotropiaceae
- Genus: Heliotropium
- Species: H. anderssonii

Binomial name
- Heliotropium anderssonii B.L.Rob.

Species of flowering plant in the borage family

Heliotropium anderssonii is a species of plant in the family Heliotropiaceae. It is endemic to Ecuador.
