= Heliotropium strictum =

Heliotropium strictum can refer to:

- Heliotropium strictum Kunth, a synonym of Euploca humilis (L.) Feuillet
- Heliotropium strictum Ledeb., a synonym of Heliotropium ellipticum Ledeb.
