= Heliotropium sokotranum =

Conservation status
- Least Concern (IUCN 3.1)

Scientific classification
- Kingdom: Plantae
- Clade: Tracheophytes
- Clade: Angiosperms
- Clade: Eudicots
- Clade: Asterids
- Order: Boraginales
- Family: Heliotropiaceae
- Genus: Heliotropium
- Species: H. sokotranum

Binomial name
- Heliotropium sokotranum Vierh. (1905)

Species of flowering plant in the borage family

Heliotropium sokotranum, aka Heliotropium socotranum, is a species of flowering plant in the family Heliotropiaceae. It is endemic to the island of Socotra. Its natural habitats are subtropical or tropical dry forests and subtropical or tropical dry shrubland.
