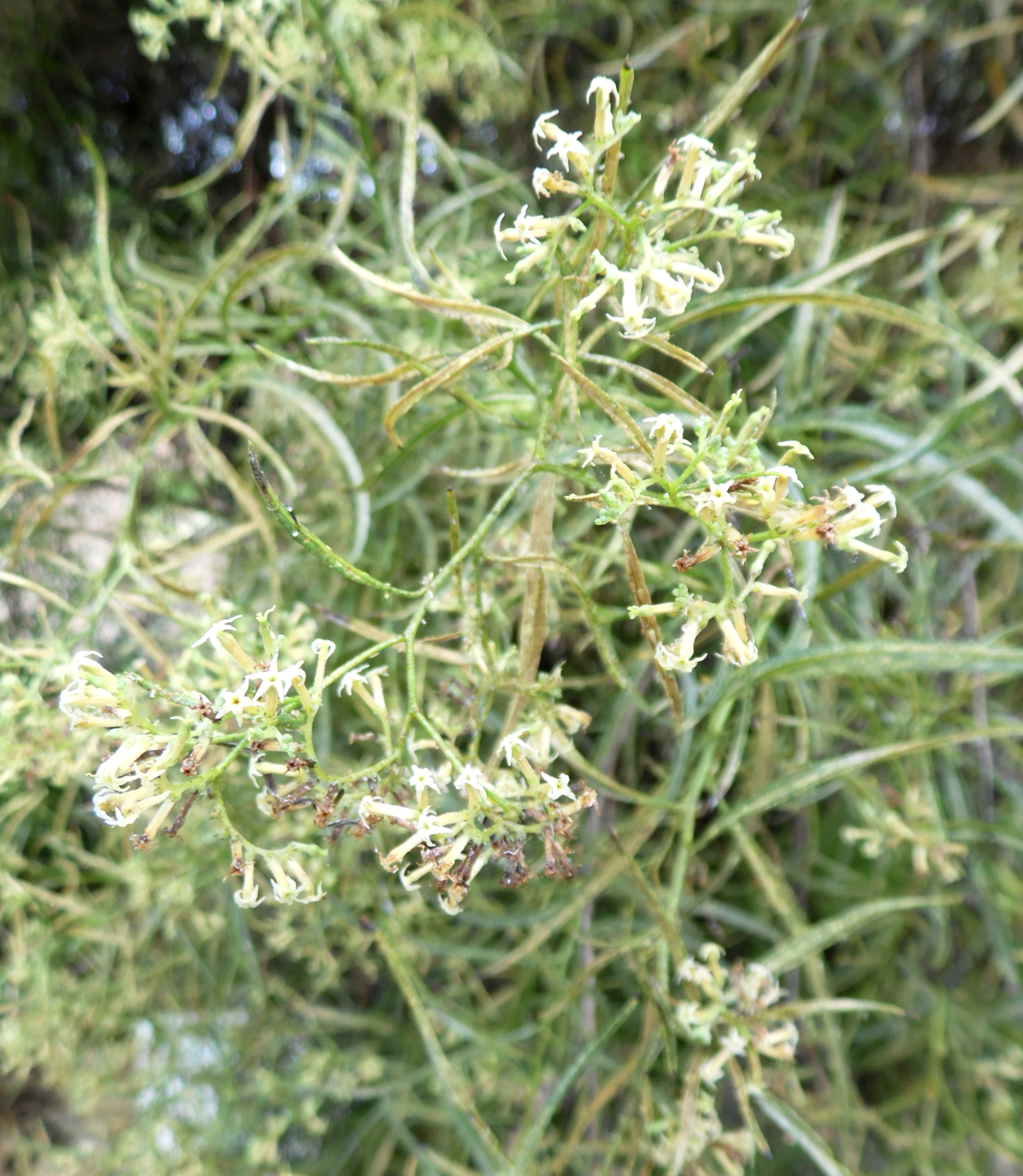
- Myriopus candidulus

Scientific classification
- Kingdom: Plantae
- Clade: Tracheophytes
- Clade: Angiosperms
- Clade: Eudicots
- Clade: Asterids
- Order: Boraginales
- Family: Boraginaceae
- Subfamily: Heliotropioideae
- Genus: Myriopus; Small

Species
- See text

Synonyms
- Verrucaria Medik.

= Myriopus =

Genus of Boraginaceae plants

Myriopus is a genus of flowering plants in the borage and forget-me-not family Boraginaceae (or Heliotropiaceae). Species in the genus are native to Latin America, the Caribbean, and Florida.

== Species ==
The following species are currently accepted in the genus Myriopus:

- Myriopus andrade-limae (J.I.M.Melo) J.I.M.Melo
- Myriopus breviflorus (A.DC.) Luebert
- Myriopus candidulus (Miers) Feuillet
- Myriopus eulinae J.I.M.Melo & R.S.Santos
- Myriopus gardneri (A.DC.) J.I.M.Melo
- Myriopus isabellinus (J.S.Mill.) J.I.M.Melo
- Myriopus maculatus (Jacq.) Feuillet
- Myriopus mapirensis (Lingelsh.) J.I.M.Melo
- Myriopus membranaceus (Gardner) J.I.M.Melo
- Myriopus microphyllus (Bertero ex Spreng.) Feuillet
- Myriopus paniculatus (Cham.) Feuillet
- Myriopus parvifolius (Alain) Feuillet
- Myriopus petionvillae (Urb. & Ekman) Feuillet
- Myriopus poliochros (Spreng.) Small
- Myriopus psilostachya (Kunth) Diane & Hilger
- Myriopus rubicundus (Salzm. ex DC.) Luebert
- Myriopus salicifolius (Gardner) J.I.M.Melo
- Myriopus salzmannii (A.DC.) Diane & Hilger
- Myriopus selleanus (Urb. & Ekman) J.I.M.Melo
- Myriopus stenophyllus (Urb.) Feuillet
- Myriopus subsessilis (Cham.) J.I.M.Melo
- Myriopus suffruticosus (L.) Feuillet
- Myriopus villosus (Salzm. ex A.DC.) J.I.M.Melo
- Myriopus volubilis (L.) Small
