= Heliotropium balfourii =

Conservation status
- Least Concern (IUCN 3.1)

Scientific classification
- Kingdom: Plantae
- Clade: Tracheophytes
- Clade: Angiosperms
- Clade: Eudicots
- Clade: Asterids
- Order: Boraginales
- Family: Heliotropiaceae
- Genus: Heliotropium
- Species: H. balfourii

Binomial name
- Heliotropium balfourii Gürke

Species of flowering plant in the borage family

Heliotropium balfourii is a species of plant in the family Heliotropiaceae. It is endemic to the island of Socotra in Yemen. Its natural habitats are subtropical or tropical dry forests and subtropical or tropical dry shrubland.
