= Heliotropium dentatum =

Conservation status
- Vulnerable (IUCN 3.1)

Scientific classification
- Kingdom: Plantae
- Clade: Tracheophytes
- Clade: Angiosperms
- Clade: Eudicots
- Clade: Asterids
- Order: Boraginales
- Family: Heliotropiaceae
- Genus: Heliotropium
- Species: H. dentatum

Binomial name
- Heliotropium dentatum Balf.f.

Species of flowering plant in the borage family

Heliotropium dentatum is a species of plant in the family Heliotropiaceae. It is endemic to northern Socotra island in Yemen. Its natural habitats are subtropical or tropical dry forests and subtropical or tropical dry shrubland.
