= Heliotropium shoabense =

Conservation status
- Data Deficient (IUCN 3.1)

Scientific classification
- Kingdom: Plantae
- Clade: Tracheophytes
- Clade: Angiosperms
- Clade: Eudicots
- Clade: Asterids
- Order: Boraginales
- Family: Heliotropiaceae
- Genus: Heliotropium
- Species: H. shoabense

Binomial name
- Heliotropium shoabense Vierh.

Species of flowering plant in the borage family

Heliotropium shoabense is a species of plant in the family Heliotropiaceae. It is a subshrub endemic to eastern Socotra, an African island which is part of Yemen.
