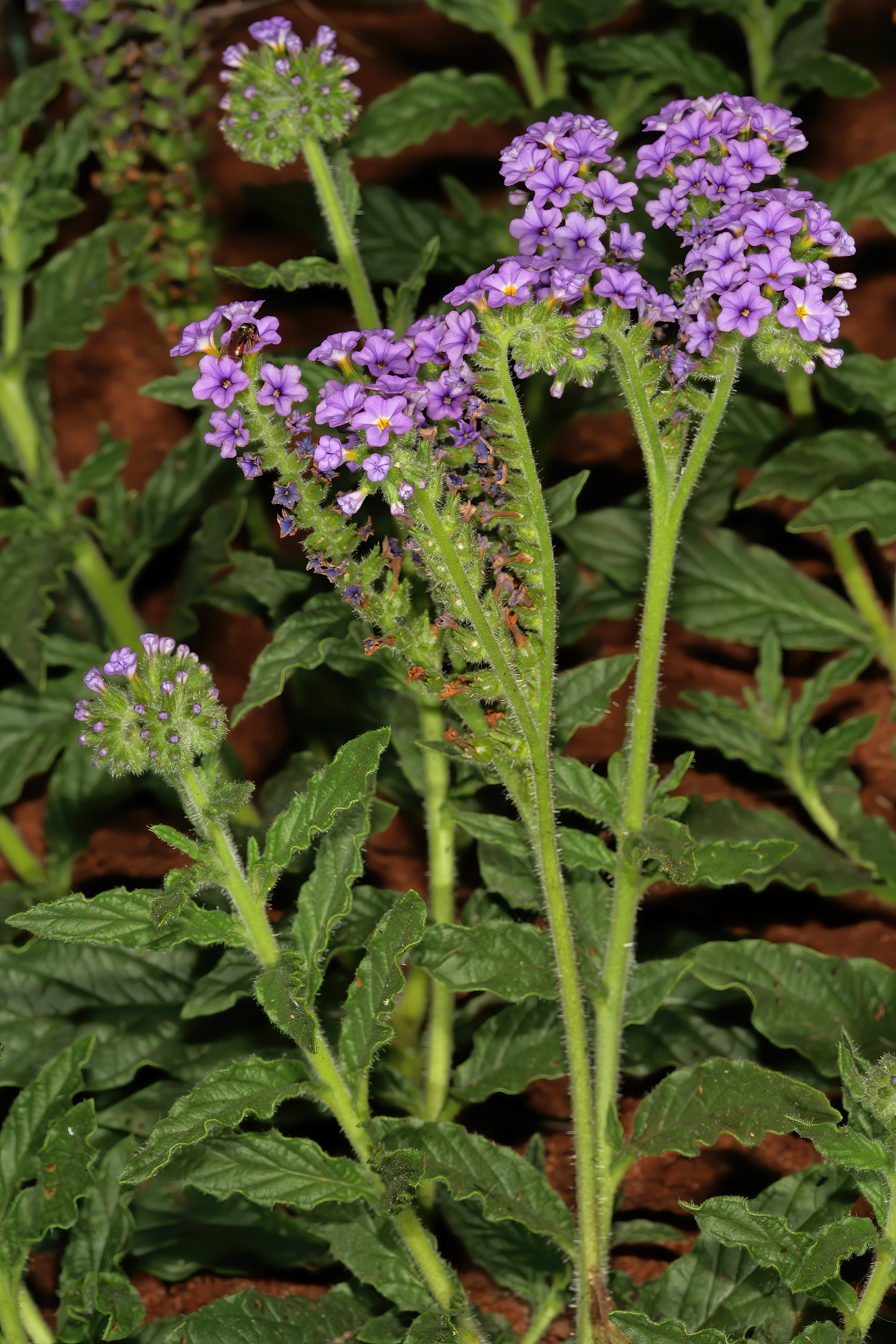

Scientific classification
- Kingdom: Plantae
- Clade: Tracheophytes
- Clade: Angiosperms
- Clade: Eudicots
- Clade: Asterids
- Order: Boraginales
- Family: Heliotropiaceae
- Genus: Heliotropium
- Species: H. amplexicaule

Binomial name
- Heliotropium amplexicaule Vahl

Synonyms
- Cochranea anchusifolia Heliotropium anchusifolium

= Heliotropium amplexicaule =

Species of flowering plant in the borage family

Heliotropium amplexicaule is a species of heliotrope known by several common names, including clasping heliotrope, blue heliotrope, and summer heliotrope. It is native to South America, especially Argentina, but it is known on several other continents where it is an introduced species, and in some areas such as eastern Australia, a noxious weed.

It was first described in 1794 by Martin Vahl.

This is a clumpy perennial herb growing branching, hairy stems to about 0.5 meters (1 ft 8 in) in maximum height. It has abundant foliage of oblong wavy-edged green leaves four to nine centimeters long. The curving terminal spike inflorescences hold several tiny bright purple flowers with rounded lobes and tubular yellow throats. The fruits are paired rough-surfaced nutlets.

Biological pest control is being investigated for reducing the spread of this plant in New South Wales and surrounding areas in Australia. The blue heliotrope leaf beetle, Deuterocampta quadrijuga, has shown promise, as has the flea beetle now called blue heliotrope flea beetle (Longitarsus spp.).

== Toxicity ==
Heliotropium amplexicaule contains pyrrolizidine alkaloids and is poisonous. This plant competes with desirable pastures and causes toxicity to stock.
