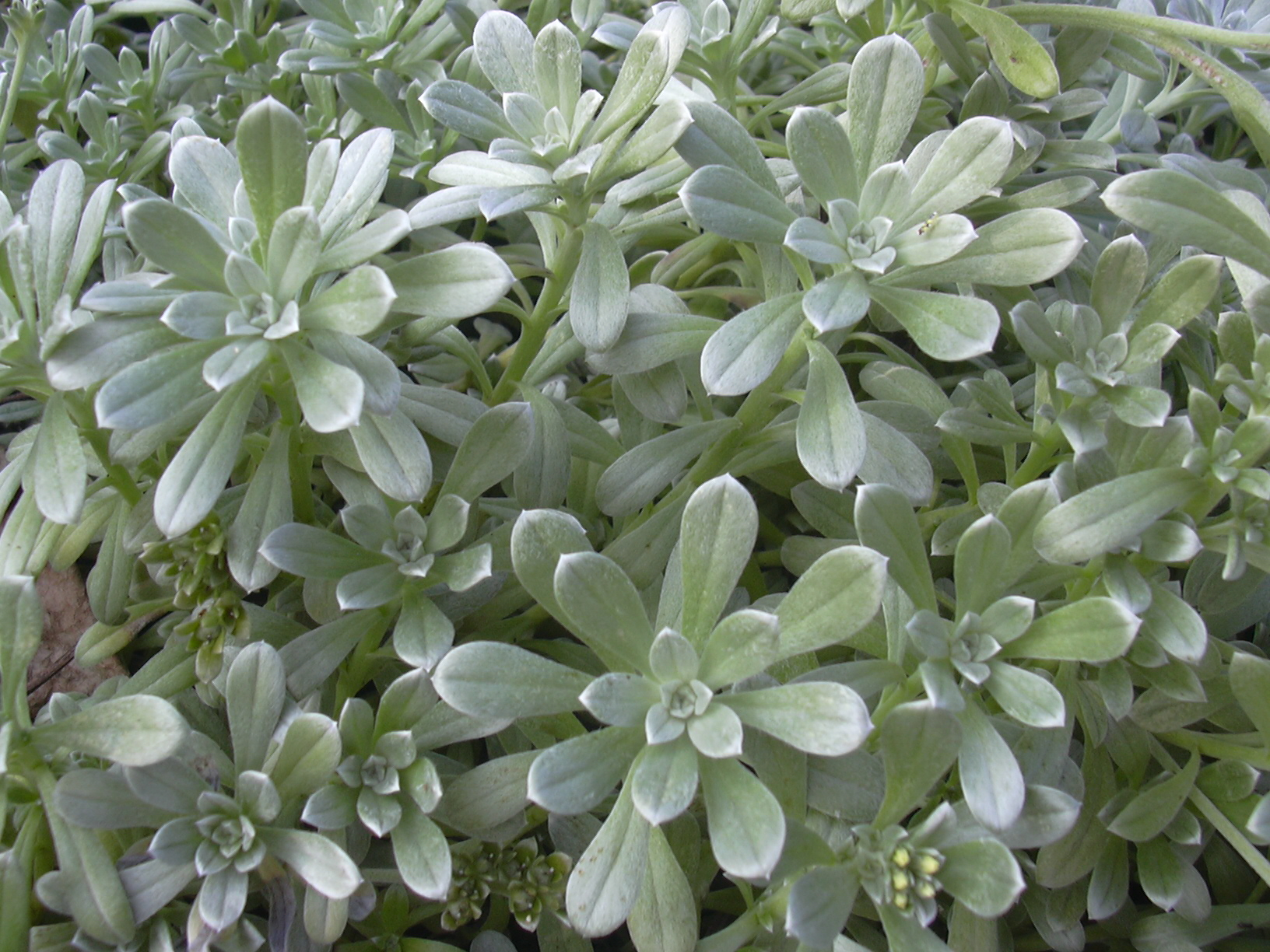
- H. a. var. argenteum

Scientific classification
- Kingdom: Plantae
- Clade: Tracheophytes
- Clade: Angiosperms
- Clade: Eudicots
- Clade: Asterids
- Order: Boraginales
- Family: Heliotropiaceae
- Genus: Heliotropium
- Species: H. anomalum

Binomial name
- Heliotropium anomalum Hook. & Arn.

= Heliotropium anomalum =

Species of flowering plant in the borage family

Heliotropium anomalum is a species of flowering shrub in the family Heliotropiaceae. Its common names include Polynesian heliotrope, Pacific heliotrope, Scrub heliotrope and hinahina kū kahakai (Hawaiian).

The species is native to the Hawaiian Islands, Guam, Christmas Island, Saipan, Tinian, Wake Island and New Caledonia.

H. a. var. argenteum is the official flower of the island Kahoʻolawe in Hawaii.
