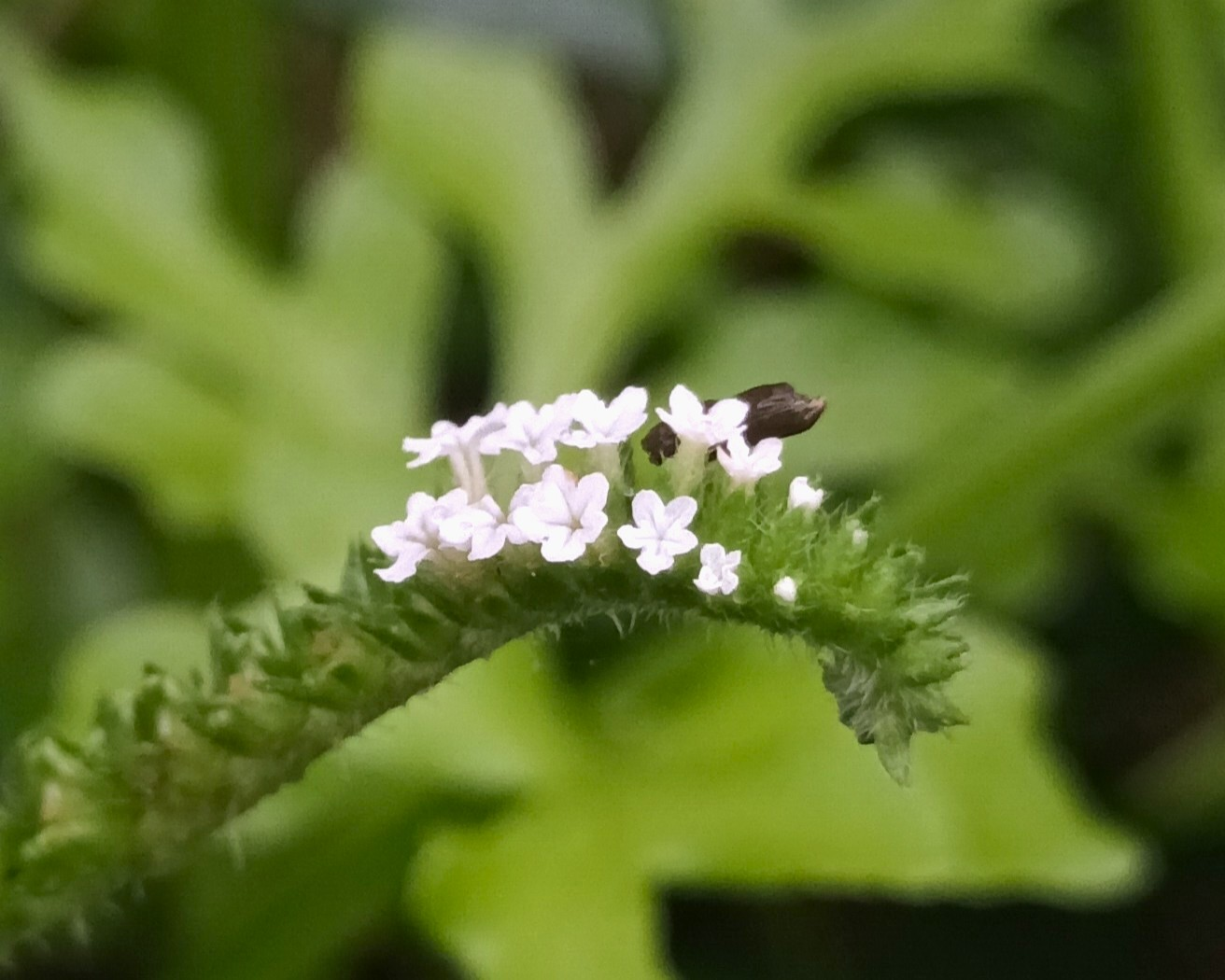

Scientific classification
- Kingdom: Plantae
- Clade: Tracheophytes
- Clade: Angiosperms
- Clade: Eudicots
- Clade: Asterids
- Order: Boraginales
- Family: Heliotropiaceae
- Genus: Heliotropium
- Species: H. keralense

Binomial name
- Heliotropium keralense Sivar. & Manilal

= Heliotropium keralense =

Species of flowering plant in the borage family

Heliotropium keralense is a small erect herb with a pubescent stem, ovate leaves and white flowers.

== Distribution ==
This species is native to South India, occurring in Karnataka (Dakshina Kannada and Udupi districts) and Kerala (Kozhikode, Malappuram, Palakkad, Thrissur, Kottayam, and Alappuzha districts).

== Uses ==
A paste made from the leaves is traditionally applied to treat scorpion stings.
