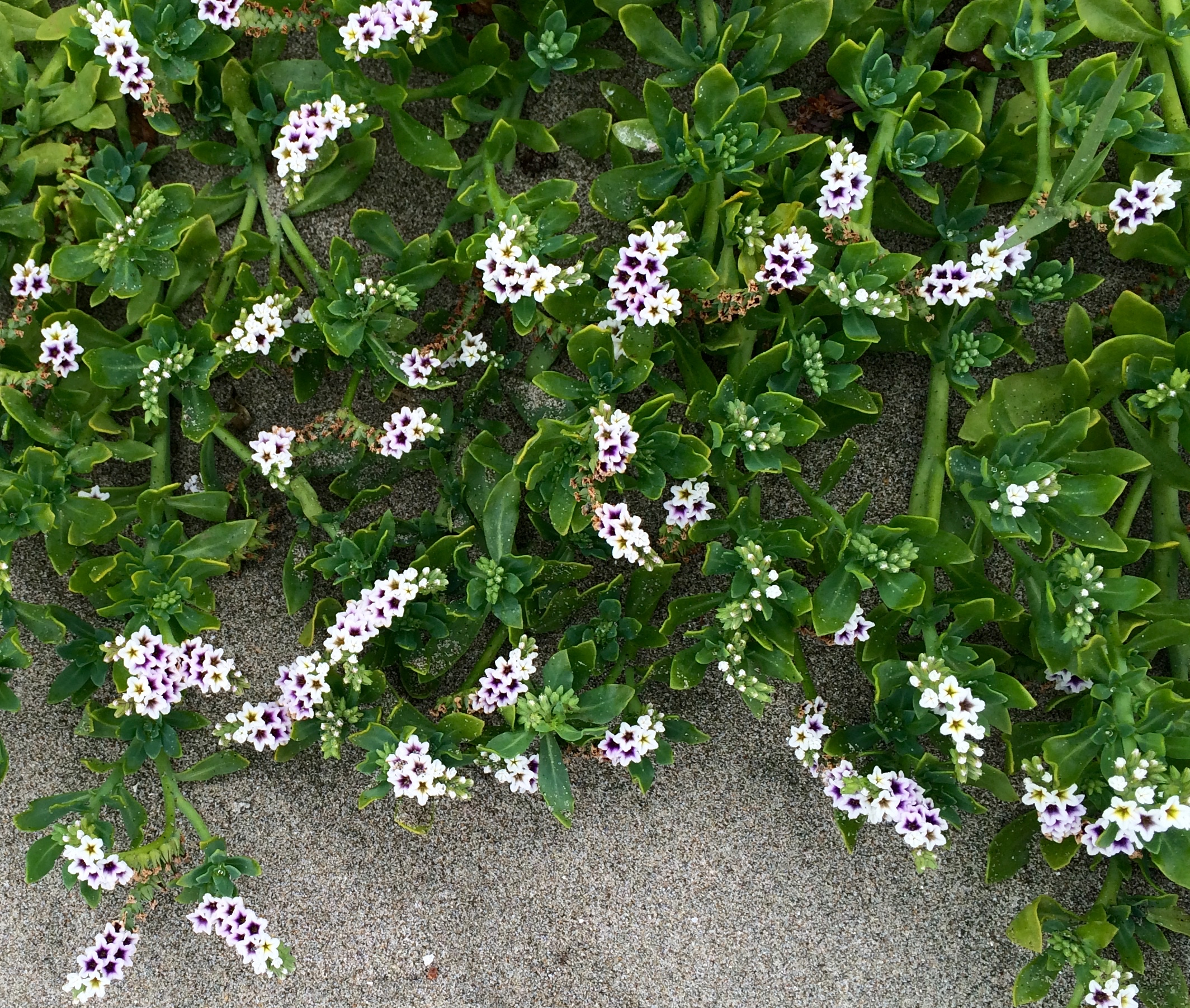
- variety oculatum in California

Conservation status
- Secure (NatureServe)

Scientific classification
- Kingdom: Plantae
- Clade: Tracheophytes
- Clade: Angiosperms
- Clade: Eudicots
- Clade: Asterids
- Order: Boraginales
- Family: Heliotropiaceae
- Genus: Heliotropium
- Species: H. curassavicum

Binomial name
- Heliotropium curassavicum L.

= Heliotropium curassavicum =

Species of flowering plant in the borage family

Heliotropium curassavicum, commonly called salt heliotrope, is a species of flowering plant in the family Heliotropiaceae. It is native to the Americas and Northern Australia and has been introduced elsewhere.

== Description ==
Heliotropium curassavicum is a perennial herb which can take the form of a prostrate creeper along the ground to a somewhat erect shrub approaching 0.5 m (1 1/2 ft) in height. The stem and foliage are fleshy, with the leaves thick and oval or spade-shaped.

The plentiful inflorescences are curled, coiling double rows of small bell-shaped flowers. Each flower is white with five rounded lobes and a purple or yellow throat. The fruit is a smooth nutlet.

== Taxonomy ==
There are five currently recognized varieties. These are:

- H. curassavicum var. argentinum - Native to the tropics of South America, including Argentina, Brazil, Paraguay, and Uruguay.
- H. curassavicum var. curassavicum - Globally widespread, native from the eastern U.S. to Argentina, and naturalized on seashores elsewhere. It has the smallest flowers, being only 2.5–3.5 mm wide
- H. curassavicum var. fruticulosum - Endemic to the San Juan and Mendoza provinces of Argentina.
- H. curassavicum var. obovatum - Widespread in western North America and Chihuahua, Mexico. Its flowers are 5–10 mm wide, with yellow or slightly purple-tinged throats.
- H. curassavicum var. oculatum - Native from southwestern Utah to Baja California. Its flowers are 3–5 mm wide with purple throats.
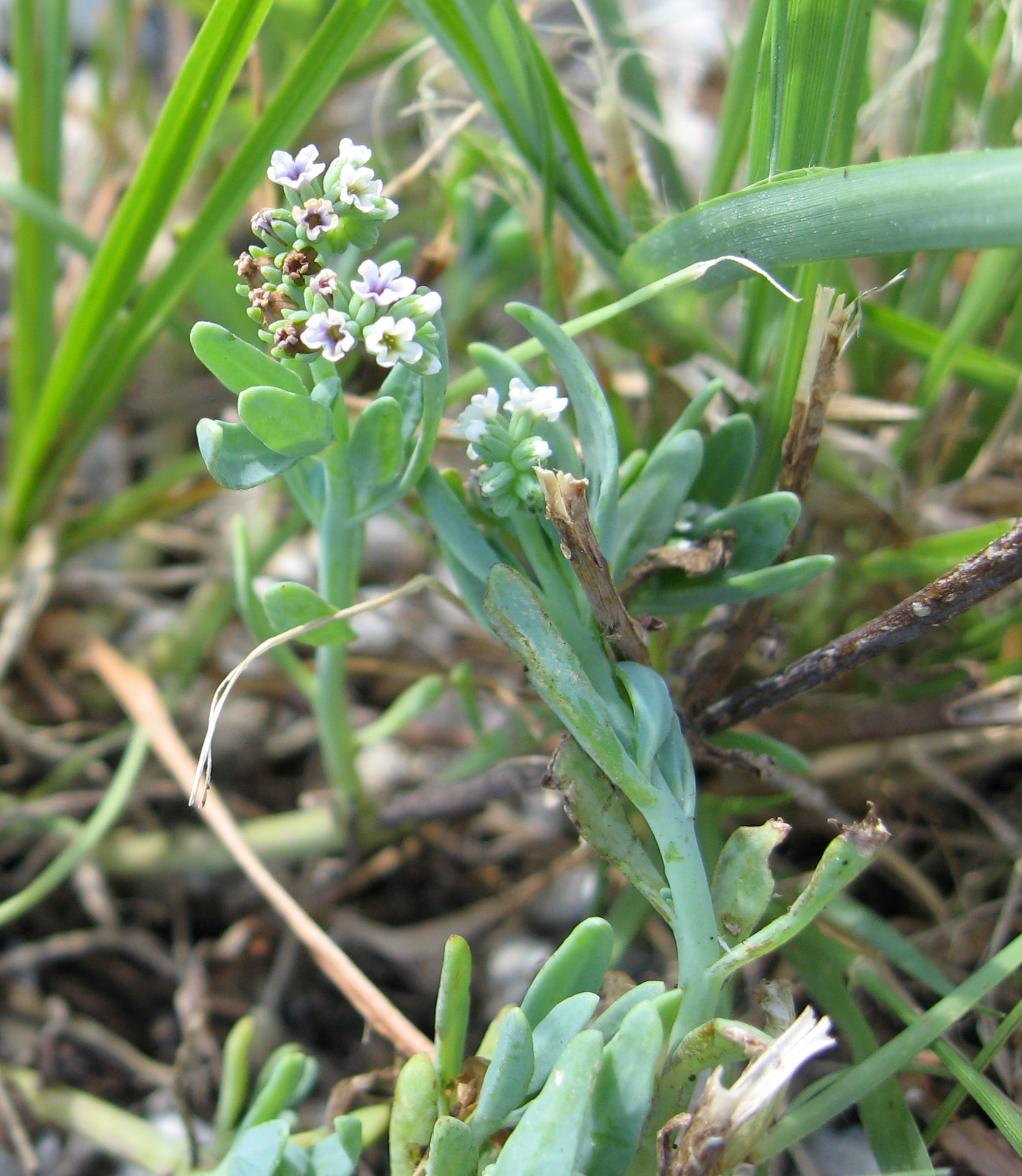
Variety curassavicum (Bahia Honda Key, Florida)

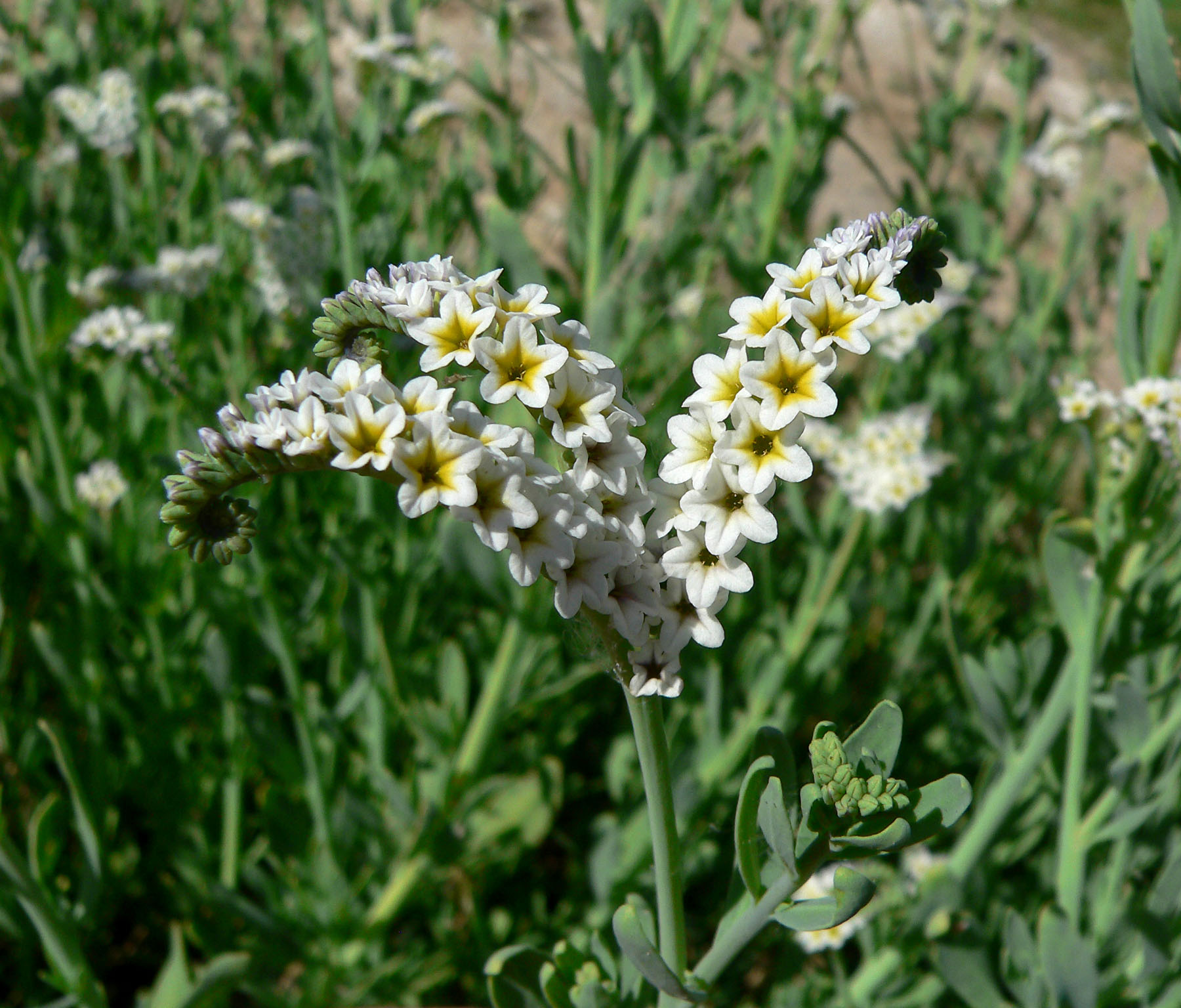
Variety obovatum (Moapa Valley, Nevada)

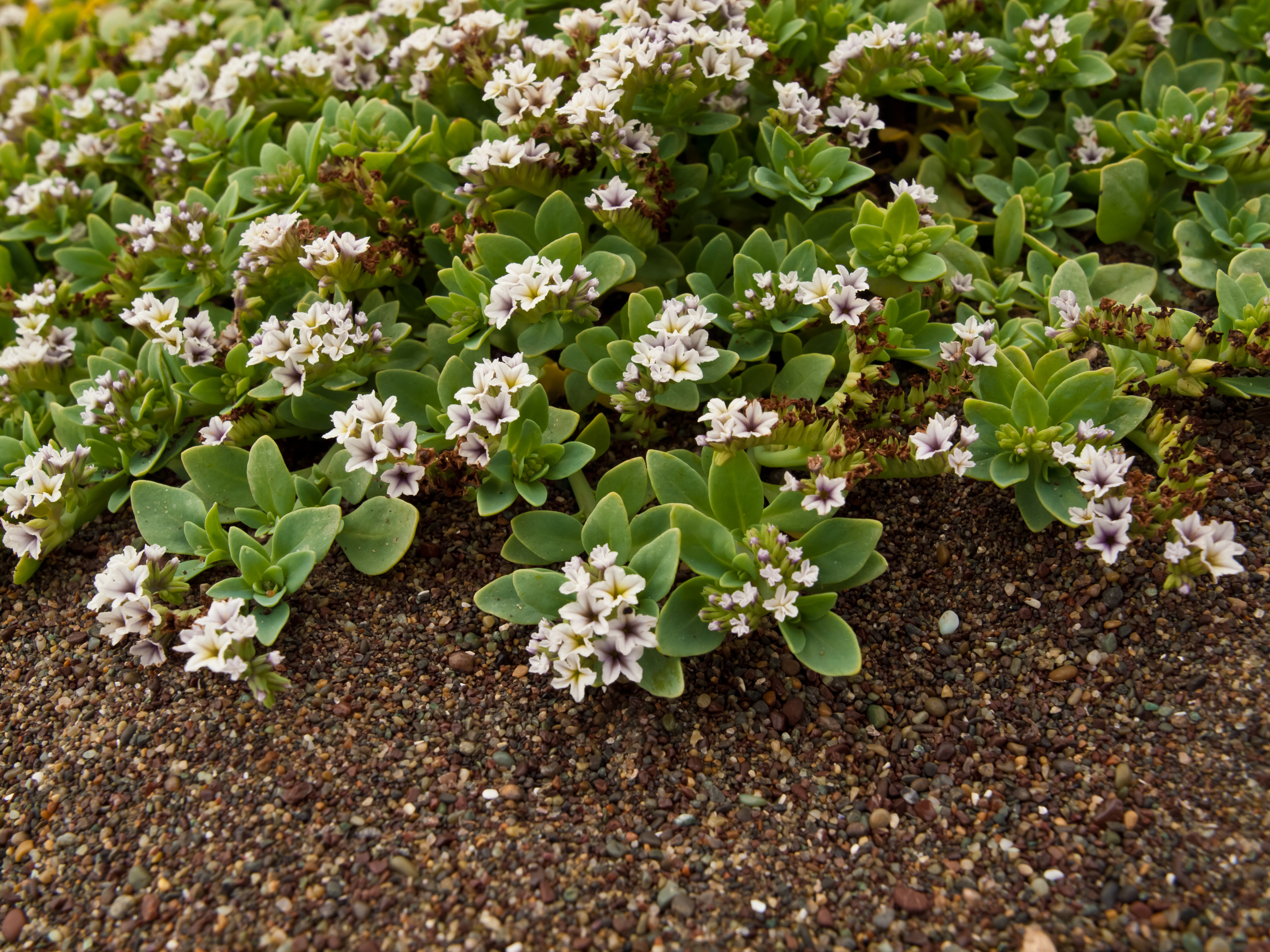
Variety oculatum (Marin County, California).

== Distribution and habitat ==
The species is native to Northern Australia including the Northern Territory, Western Australia and Queensland, and to much of the Americas, from Canada to Argentina, including the West Indies and Hawaii. It can be found as an introduced species (in some cases being invasive) in Africa, Eurasia, and southern Australia.

It thrives in salty soils, such as beach sand, alkali flats, and salt marshes. It is often found in disturbed coastal sites.

== Common names ==
Due to its wide geographical range that spans many nations and languages, H. curassavicum has been given an assortment of common names. In English, these include salt heliotrope, seaside heliotrope, monkey tail, quail plant and Chinese parsley. In Latin American Spanish, it is known as cola de mico, cola de gama or rabo alacrán. It is called kīpūkai in Hawaii.
