= Ixorhea =

Scientific classification
- Kingdom: Plantae
- Clade: Tracheophytes
- Clade: Angiosperms
- Clade: Eudicots
- Clade: Asterids
- Order: Boraginales
- Family: Heliotropiaceae
- Genus: Ixorhea; Fenzl
- Species: I. tschudiana

Binomial name
- Ixorhea tschudiana Fenzl

Genus of plants

Ixorhea is a genus of flowering plants belonging to the family Heliotropiaceae. Its only species is Ixorhea tschudiana. It may also be placed in the family Boraginaceae.

Its native range is Northwestern Argentina.
