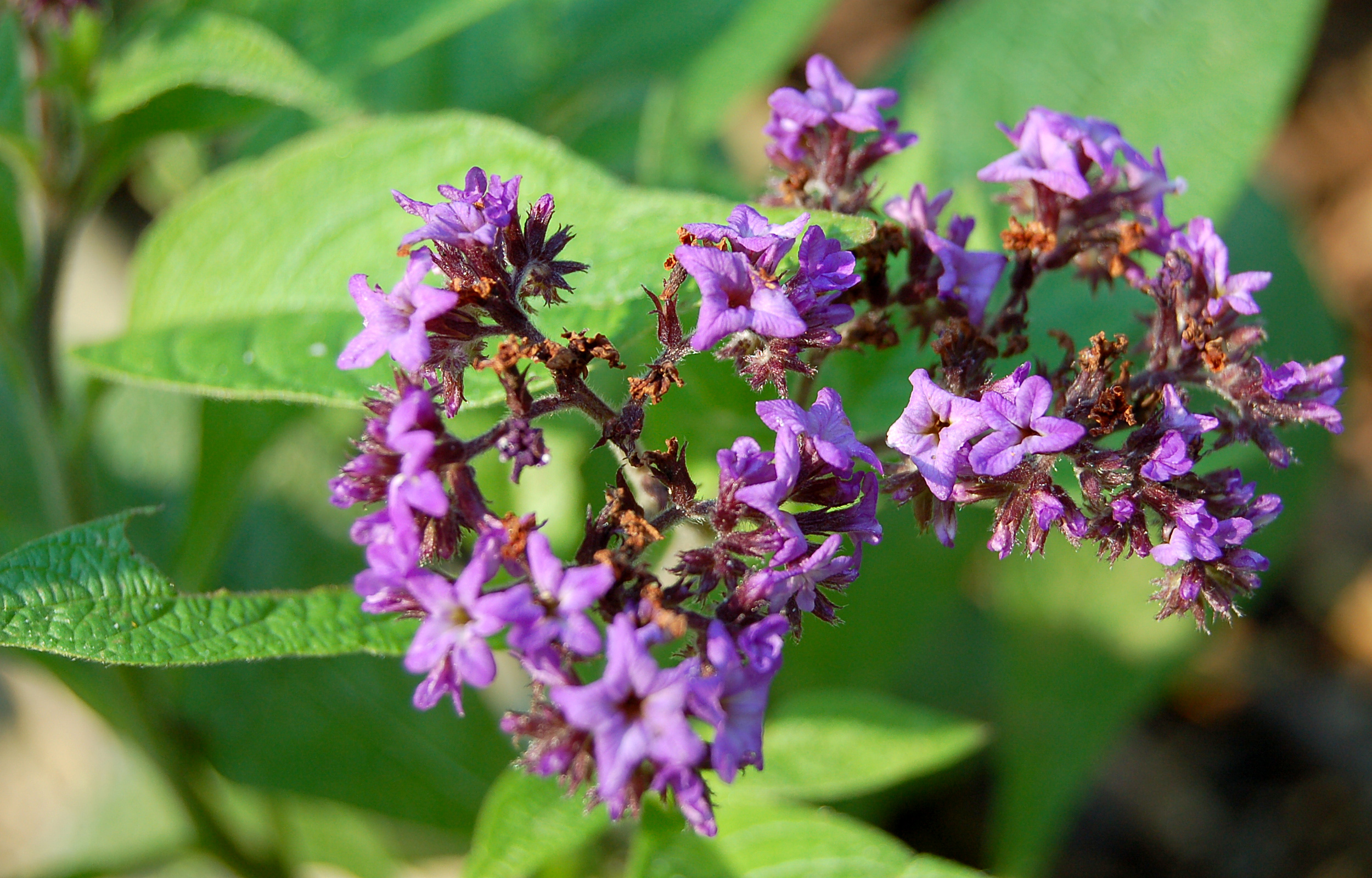

Scientific classification
- Kingdom: Plantae
- Clade: Tracheophytes
- Clade: Angiosperms
- Clade: Eudicots
- Clade: Asterids
- Order: Boraginales
- Family: Heliotropiaceae
- Genus: Heliotropium
- Species: H. arborescens

Binomial name
- Heliotropium arborescens L.

Synonyms
- Heliotropium corymbosum Ruiz & Pav.; Heliotropium peruvianum L.

= Heliotropium arborescens =

Garden heliotrope

Species of flowering plant in the borage family

Heliotropium arborescens, the garden heliotrope or just heliotrope, is a species of flowering plant in the family Heliotropiaceae, native to Bolivia, Colombia, and Peru. Common names also include cherry pie and common heliotrope.

== Description ==
Growing to 1.2 m (3.9 ft) tall and broad, it is a bushy, evergreen, short-lived shrub with dense clusters of bright purple flowers, notable for their intense, rather vanilla-like fragrance. Like many borage plants, the vanilla flower also contains poisonous pyrrolizidine alkaloids in addition to the fragrances.

== Distribution and habitat ==
The species is native to Bolivia, Colombia, and Peru.

== Cultivation ==
As a perennial, it is hardy in zones 10 to 11, and requires wintering indoors in zones 9 or colder. It is hardy down to about 5 °C (41 °F). It can also be grown as a half-hardy annual (grown from seed under glass and planted out after all danger of frost has passed) in those areas. Alternatively soft-wood cuttings may be taken in summer.

During the Victorian era in England this plant gained great recognition, often appearing in gardens and the herbaceous borders of parks. They were also grown as standards. A vanilla-scented heliotrope was laid on the coffin of the American poet Emily Dickinson. Note that the common name "garden heliotrope" may also refer to valerian, which is not closely related.

=== Cultivars ===
Its popularity may have become less in more modern times, but hardy and colourful cultivars, such as 'Princess Marina', have ensured that this plant still regularly appears in seed catalogues and garden centres. Other popular cultivars include, 'Mary Fox', the highly scented 'White Lady' or 'White Queen' and the taller 'Florence Nightingale'.

- 'Fragrant delight' has more fragrant purple flowers, and leaves with purple highlights.
- 'Marine' has large highly fragrant dark purple flowerheads to 15 cm (6 in) diameter, and burgundy leaves.
- 'Sweet heaven' has paler fragrant flowers and is more heat-tolerant.
- 'White' has flowers that smell of almonds.

‘Chatsworth’ and 'Princess Marina', both strongly scented with deep purple flowers, have gained the Royal Horticultural Society's Award of Garden Merit.

== Toxicity ==
The seeds are poisonous. The ASPCA's Animal Poison Control Center article on heliotropes lists them as a substance which is toxic to horses and can induce liver failure in equines. The plant is not very palatable, but will be eaten by animals with no other forage; poisonings typically occur from ingestion of green plant material or material in hay.

The toxic components can cause liver failure, referred to as "walking disease" or "sleepy staggers". Signs include weight loss, weakness, sleepiness, yawning, incoordination, yellowish discoloration to mucous membranes (icterus), neurologic problems secondary to liver failure (aimless walking, chewing motions, head pressing). Animals may appear to be normal at first, then become suddenly affected; the syndrome progresses rapidly over a few days to a week.

Pyrrolizidine alkaloids often cause upset stomachs and liver damage for humans who ingest any part of the plant.

The purple coloration of the flower lent itself to the so-called "heliotrope cyanosis" that was characteristic of severely ill patients in the 1918 flu pandemic.

== Gallery ==
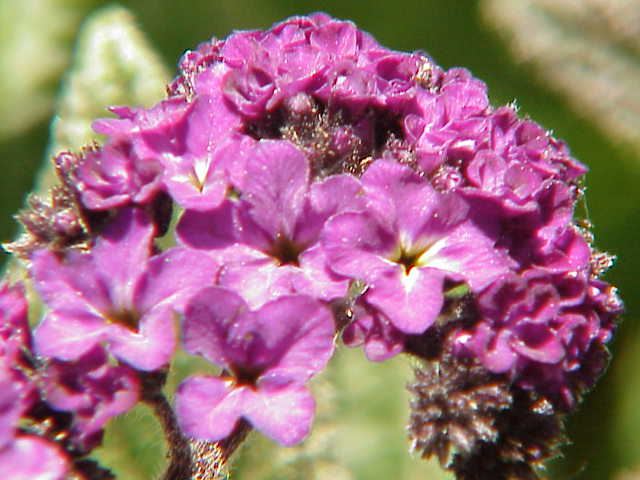

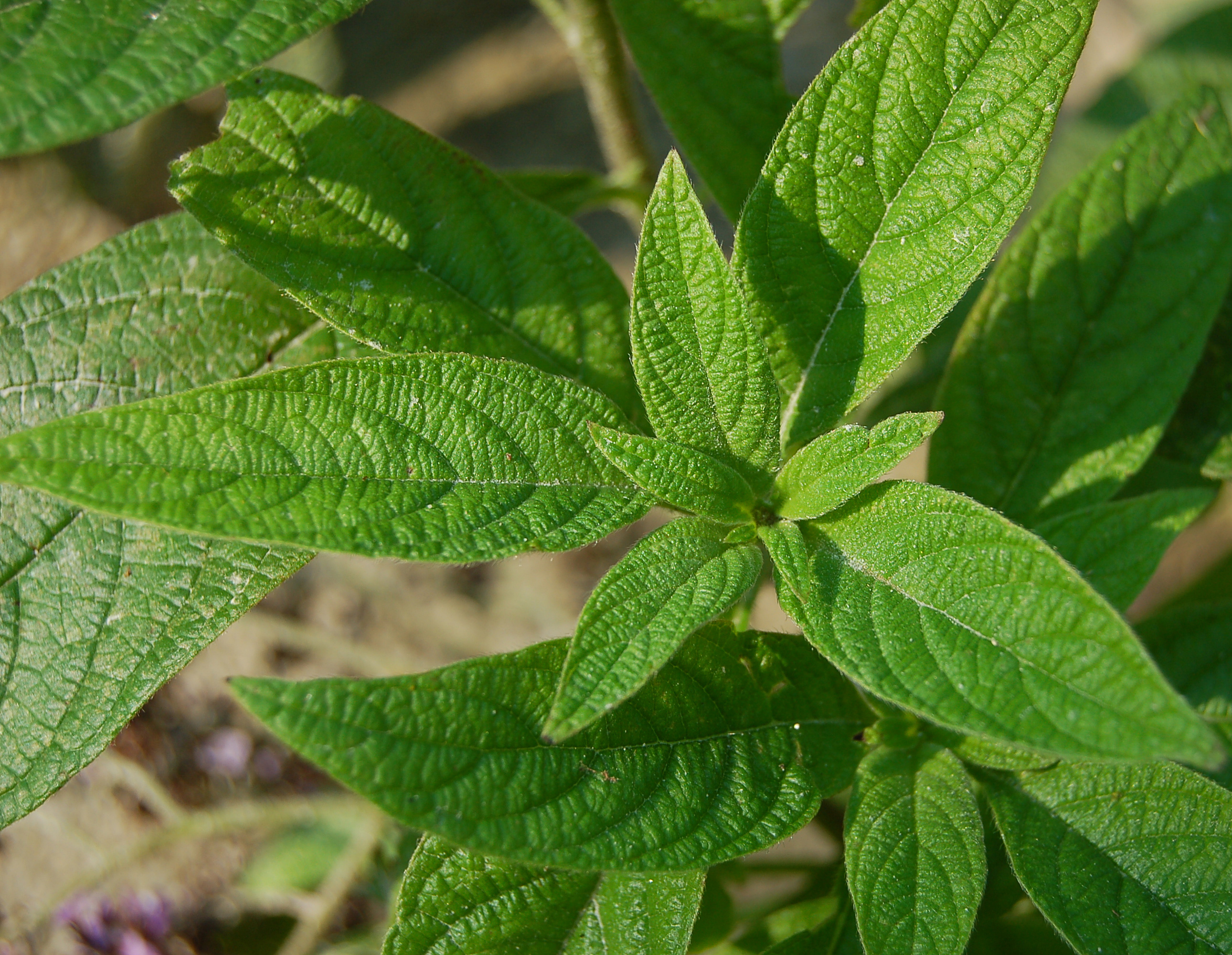

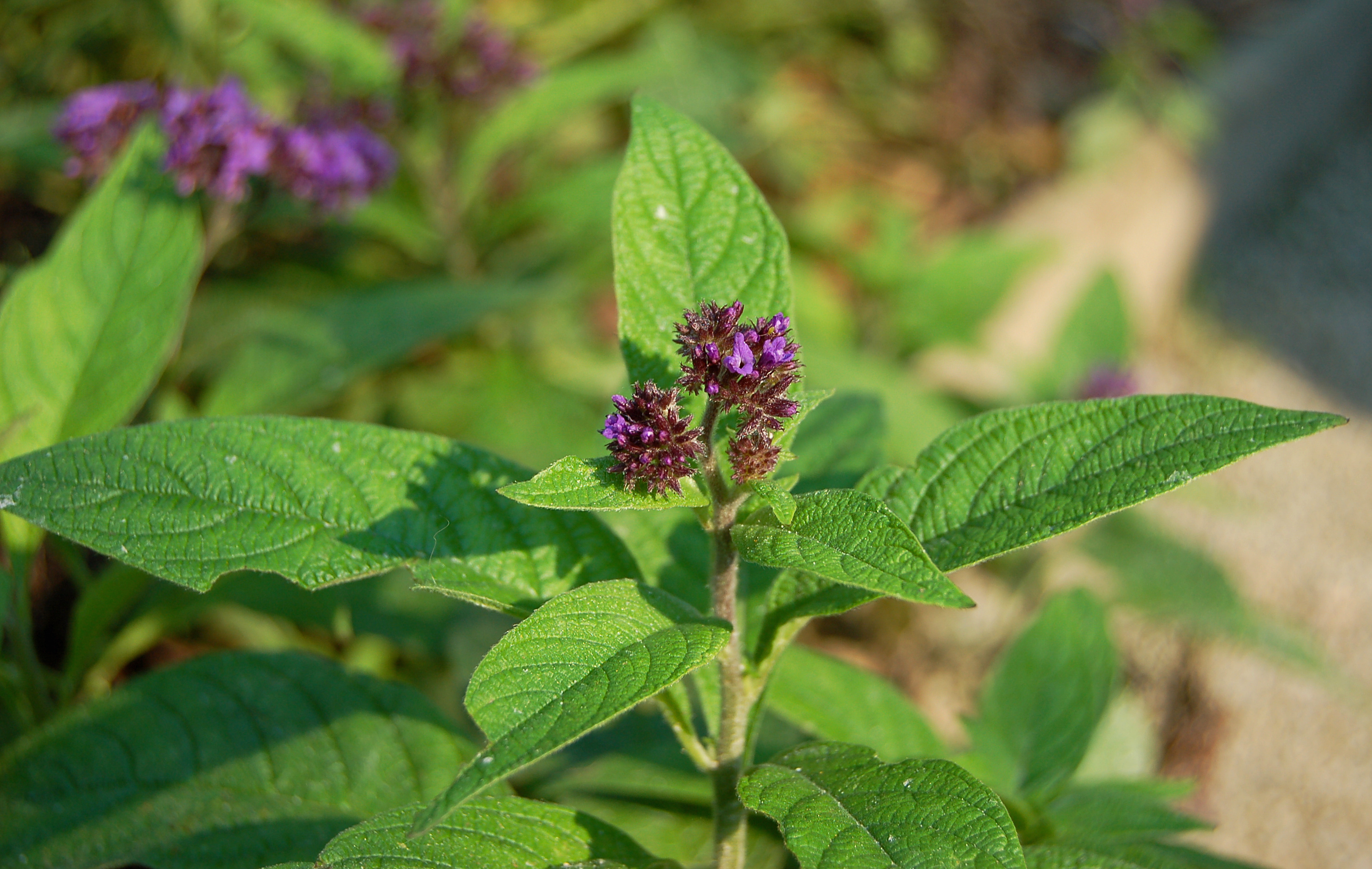

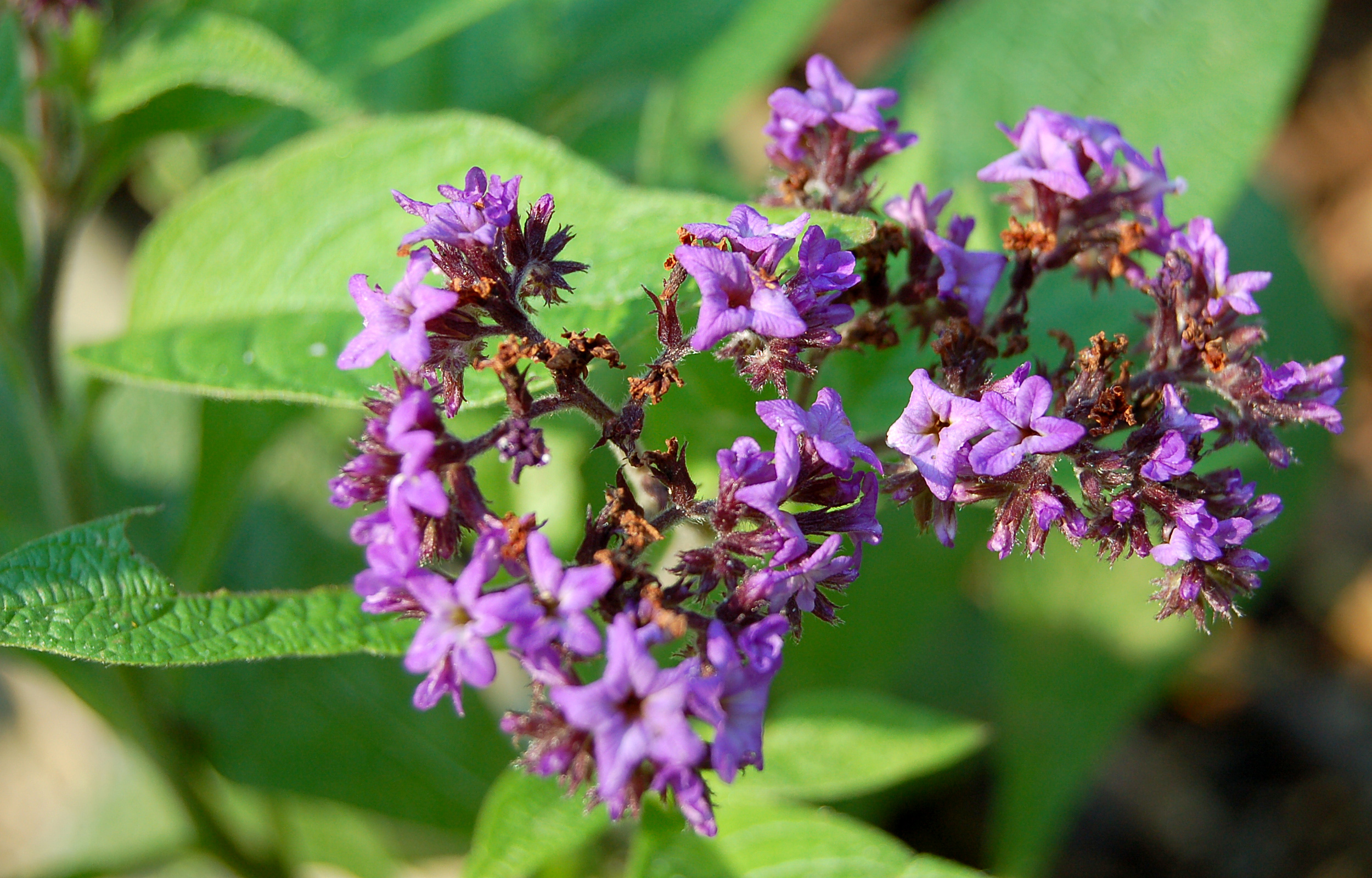
