= Heliotropium paulayanum =

Conservation status
- Vulnerable (IUCN 3.1)

Scientific classification
- Kingdom: Plantae
- Clade: Tracheophytes
- Clade: Angiosperms
- Clade: Eudicots
- Clade: Asterids
- Order: Boraginales
- Family: Heliotropiaceae
- Genus: Heliotropium
- Species: H. paulayanum

Binomial name
- Heliotropium paulayanum Vierh.

Species of flowering plant in the borage family

Heliotropium paulayanum is a species of plant in the family Heliotropiaceae. It is endemic to the island of Abd al Kuri in Yemen's Socotra Archipelago. Its natural habitat is subtropical or tropical dry shrubland.
