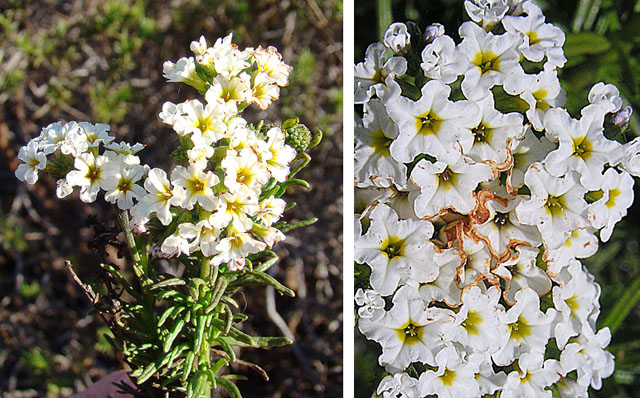

Scientific classification
- Kingdom: Plantae
- Clade: Tracheophytes
- Clade: Angiosperms
- Clade: Eudicots
- Clade: Asterids
- Order: Boraginales
- Family: Heliotropiaceae
- Genus: Heliotropium
- Species: H. stenophyllum

Binomial name
- Heliotropium stenophyllum Hook. et Arn.

= Heliotropium stenophyllum =

Species of flowering plant in the borage family

Heliotropium stenophyllum is a species of plant in the family Heliotropiaceae. It is endemic to Chile. Its natural habitats are semi-desert coastal areas of Northern Chile, in the 3 and 4 Region.
