= Heliotropium derafontense =

Conservation status
- Data Deficient (IUCN 3.1)

Scientific classification
- Kingdom: Plantae
- Clade: Tracheophytes
- Clade: Angiosperms
- Clade: Eudicots
- Clade: Asterids
- Order: Boraginales
- Family: Heliotropiaceae
- Genus: Heliotropium
- Species: H. derafontense

Binomial name
- Heliotropium derafontense Vierh.

Species of flowering plant in the borage family

Heliotropium derafontense is a species of plant in the family Heliotropiaceae. It is endemic to north-northeastern Socotra in Yemen.
