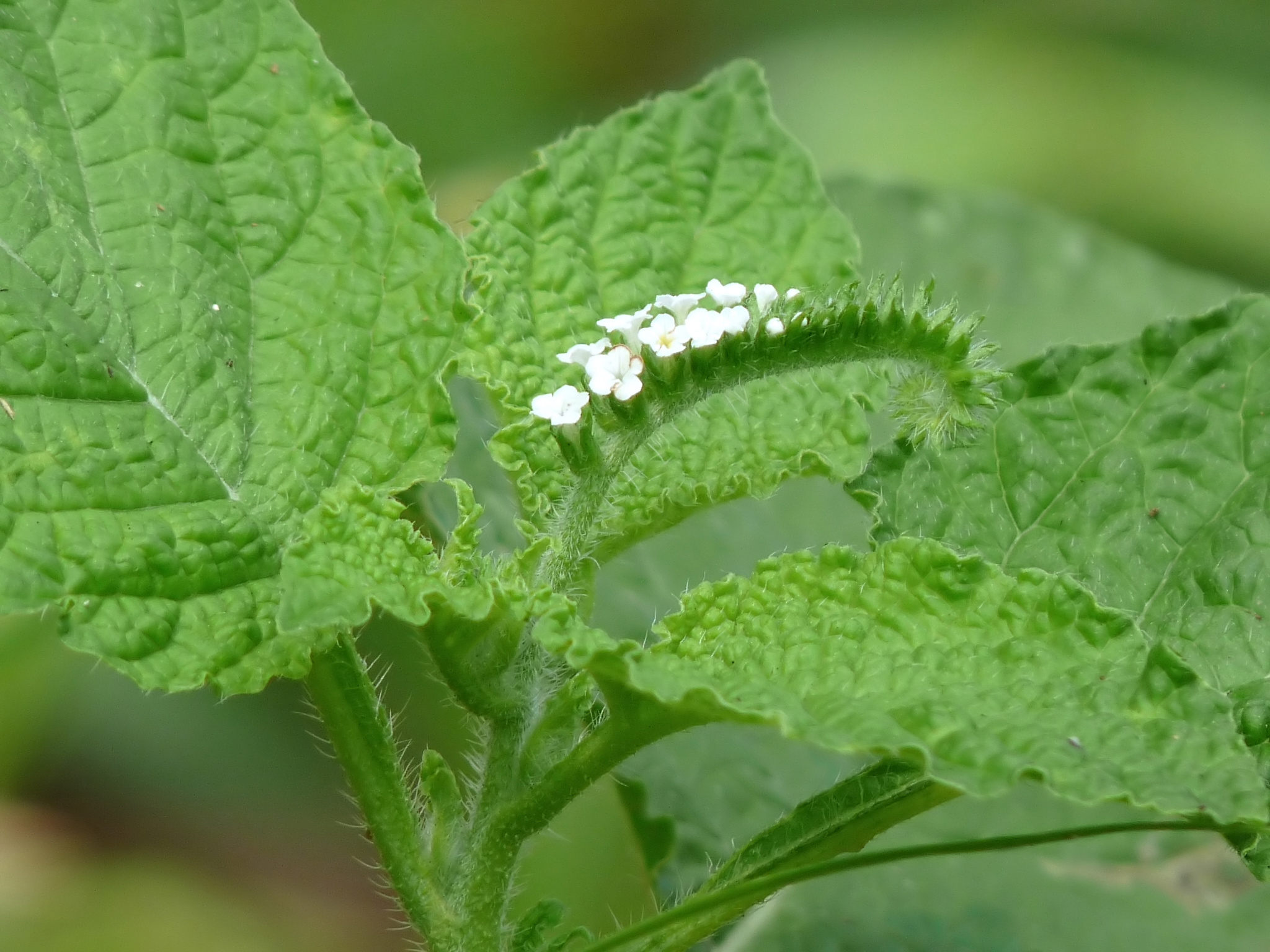

Conservation status
- Least Concern (IUCN 3.1)

Scientific classification
- Kingdom: Plantae
- Clade: Embryophytes
- Clade: Tracheophytes
- Clade: Angiosperms
- Clade: Eudicots
- Clade: Asterids
- Order: Boraginales
- Family: Heliotropiaceae
- Genus: Heliotropium
- Species: H. indicum

Binomial name
- Heliotropium indicum L.

Synonyms
- Heliophytum indicum Heliotropium parviflorum Tiaridium indicum

= Heliotropium indicum =

Species of flowering plant in the borage family

Heliotropium indicum, commonly known as Indian heliotrope or Indian turnsole, is an annual, hirsute plant. It has a curved arrangement of small flowers and velvety broad green leaves.

Native to South America and introduced to North America, Asia, and Africa, it is a common weed in waste places and settled areas. It contains toxic pyrrolizidine alkaloids but has been used in traditional medicine.

== Description ==
Indian heliotrope is an annual, erect, branched plant that can grow to a height of about 15–50 cm (5.9–19.7 in). It has a hairy stem, bearing alternating ovate to oblong-ovate leaves. It has small white or purple flowers with a green calyx; five stamens borne on a corolla tube; a terminal style; and a four-lobed ovary.

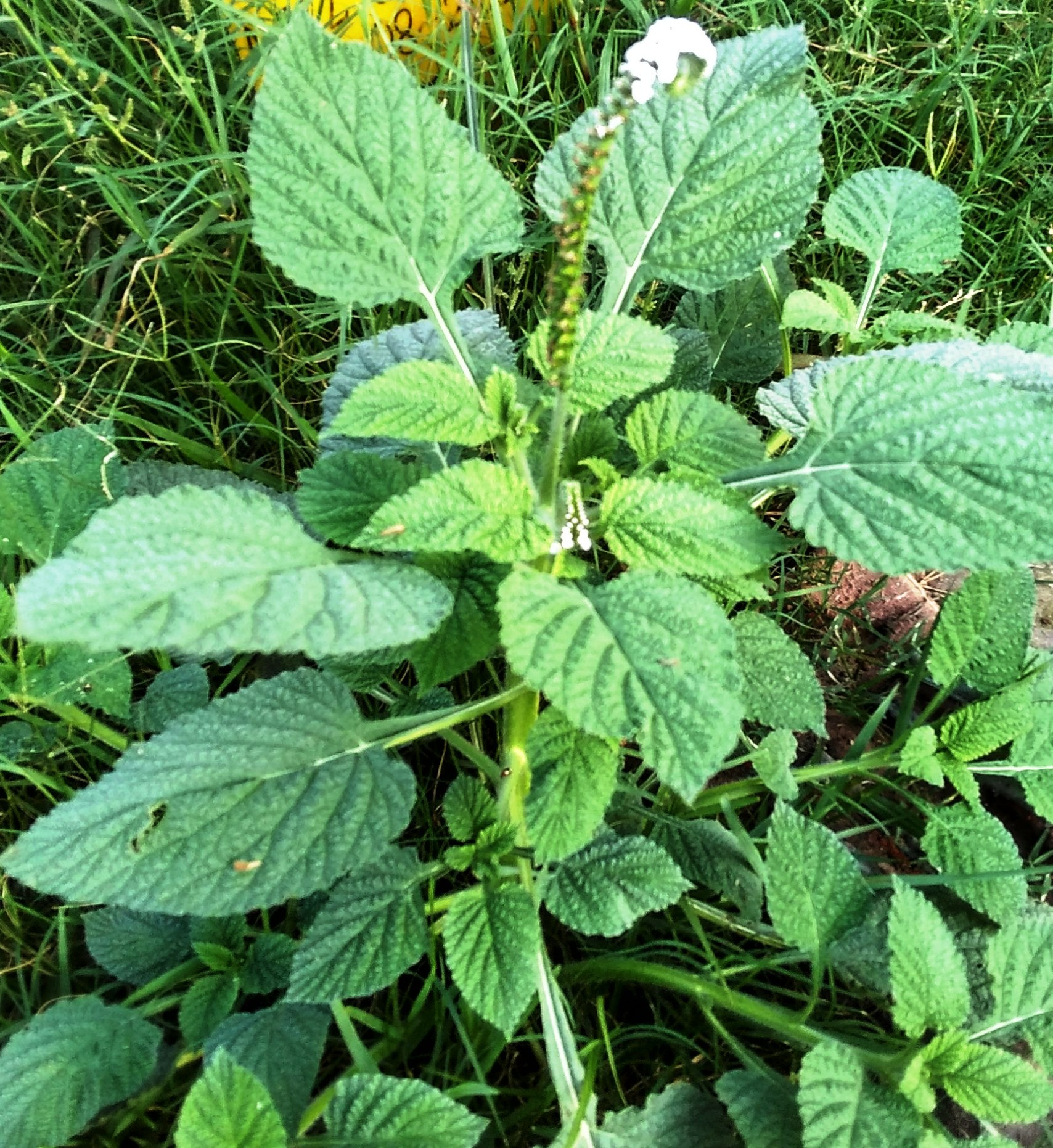
Leaves and flower

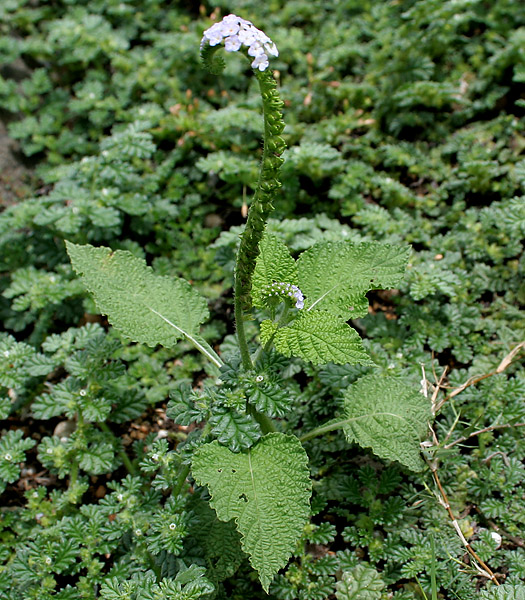
In Telangana, India

== Distribution and habitat ==
Native to South America and introduced pantropically

== Toxicity ==
Heliotropium indicum contains tumorigenic pyrrolizidine alkaloids.

== Traditional medicine ==
In the Philippines, the plant is chiefly used as a traditional medicine. The extracted juice from the pounded leaves of the plants is used on wounds, skin ulcers and furuncles. The juice is also used as an eye drop for conjunctivitis. The pounded leaves are used as poultice.

It is widely used in native medicine in Tamil Nadu, India.
