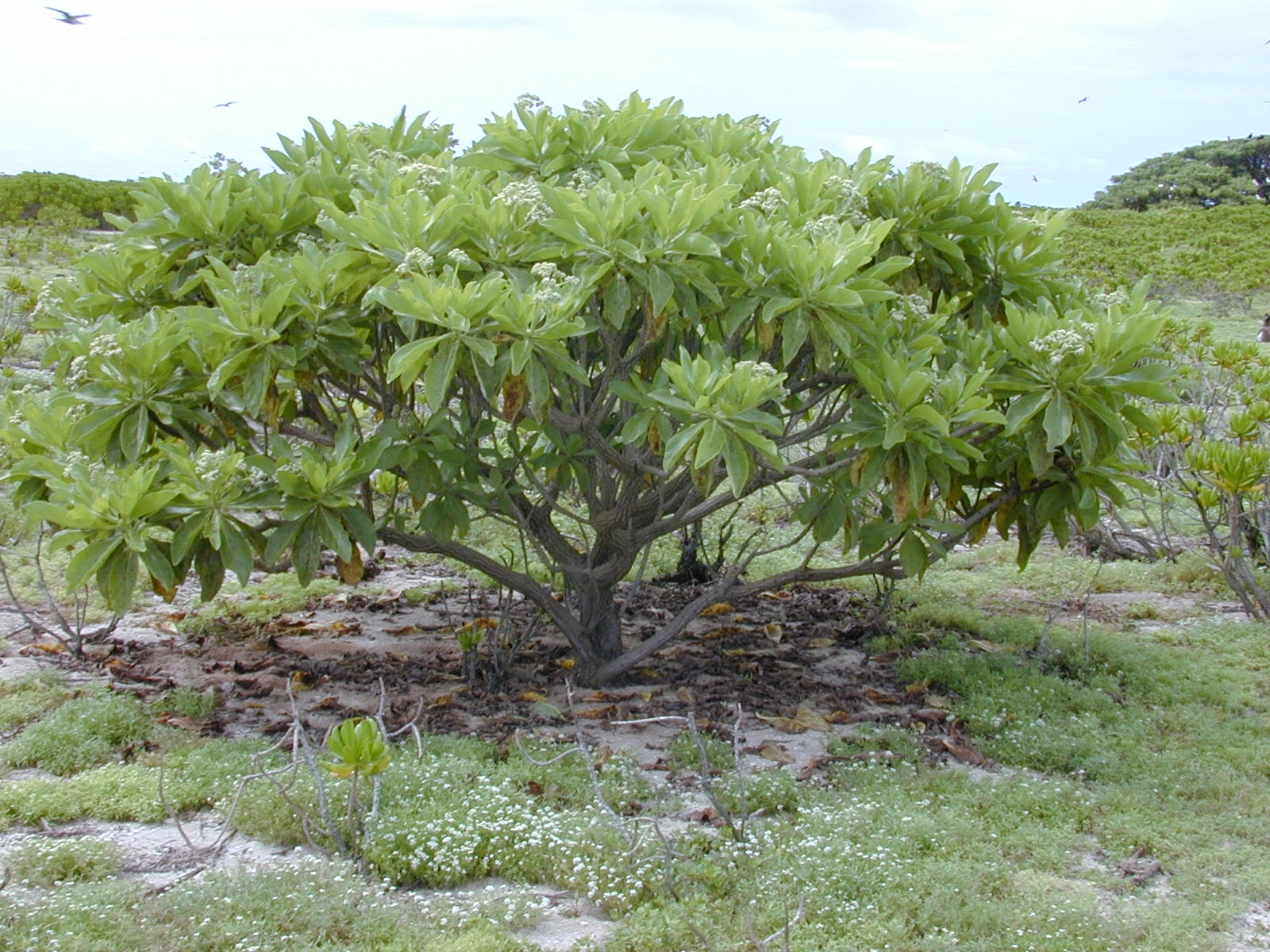
- In the Hawaiian Islands

Conservation status
- Least Concern (IUCN 3.1)

Scientific classification
- Kingdom: Plantae
- Clade: Embryophytes
- Clade: Tracheophytes
- Clade: Angiosperms
- Clade: Eudicots
- Clade: Asterids
- Order: Boraginales
- Family: Heliotropiaceae
- Genus: Heliotropium
- Species: H. arboreum

Binomial name
- Heliotropium arboreum (Blanco) Mabb.

Synonyms
- Argusia argentea (L.f.) Heine; Heliotropium foertherianum Diane & Hilger; Messerschmidia argentea (L.f.) I.M.Johnst.; Tournefortia arborea Blanco; Tournefortia argentea L.f.

= Heliotropium arboreum =

Species of plant

Heliotropium arboreum is a species of flowering plant in the family Heliotropiaceae. It is native to tropical Asia including southern China, Madagascar, northern Australia, and most of the atolls and high islands of Micronesia and Polynesia. Common names include velvetleaf soldierbush, tree heliotrope, veloutier, and octopus bush. It is a shrub or small tree typical of littoral zones reaching a height of 3.6 m (12 ft), with a spread of about 5 m (16 ft).

== Taxonomy ==
Originally published as Tournefortia argentea, it was transferred to Argusia argentea, and remained under that name until recently. It was subsequently restored to the genus Tournefortia before being transferred into the genus Heliotropium under a new name in 2003.

== Botanical description ==
The tree heliotrope is a small to medium sized growing tree that typically reaches heights of 3.7 metres (12 ft). The leaves of this tree are light green in color, silvery in sheen, and silky in texture. The tree produces small fruits and flowers during its bloom, (May through November). The flowers are tiny, reaching only 0.61 centimetres (0.24 in) in diameter, white, and do not begin to appear until the tree has reached a few years of age. The fruits it produces are small, opaque and fleshy. The bark is light gray/brown and is corrugated.

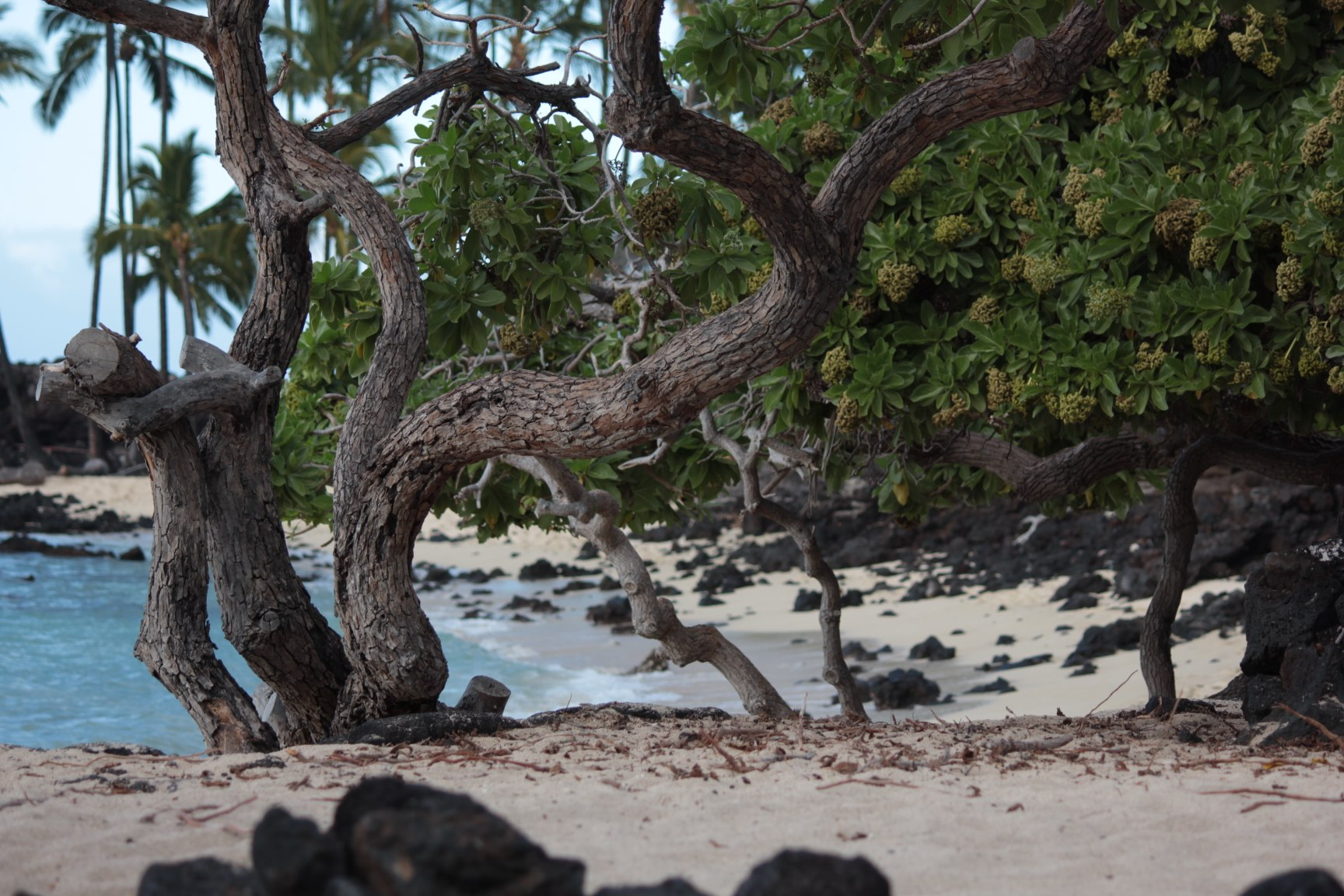
Tree heliotrope grove in Hawaii

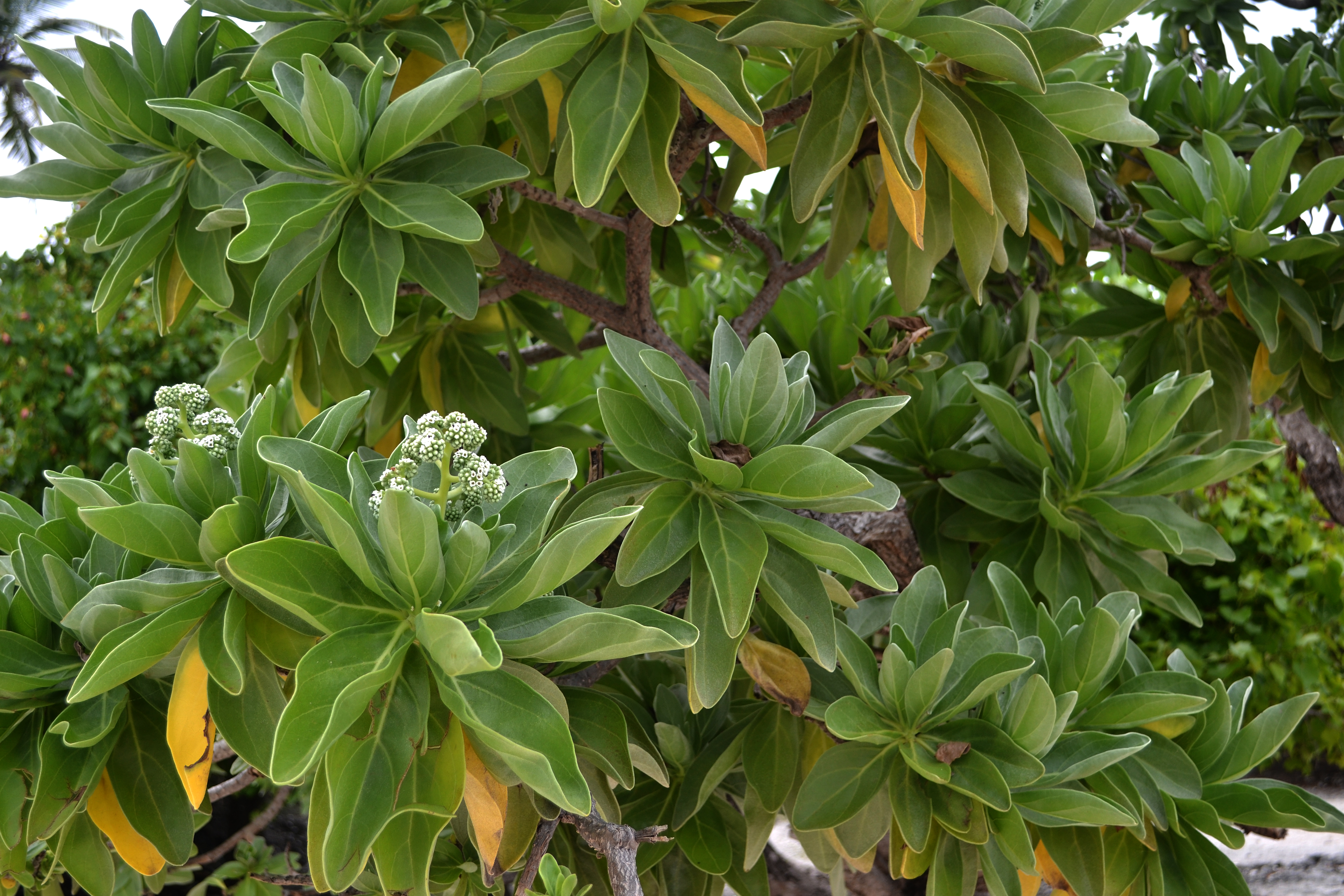
Closeup of leaves and flowers

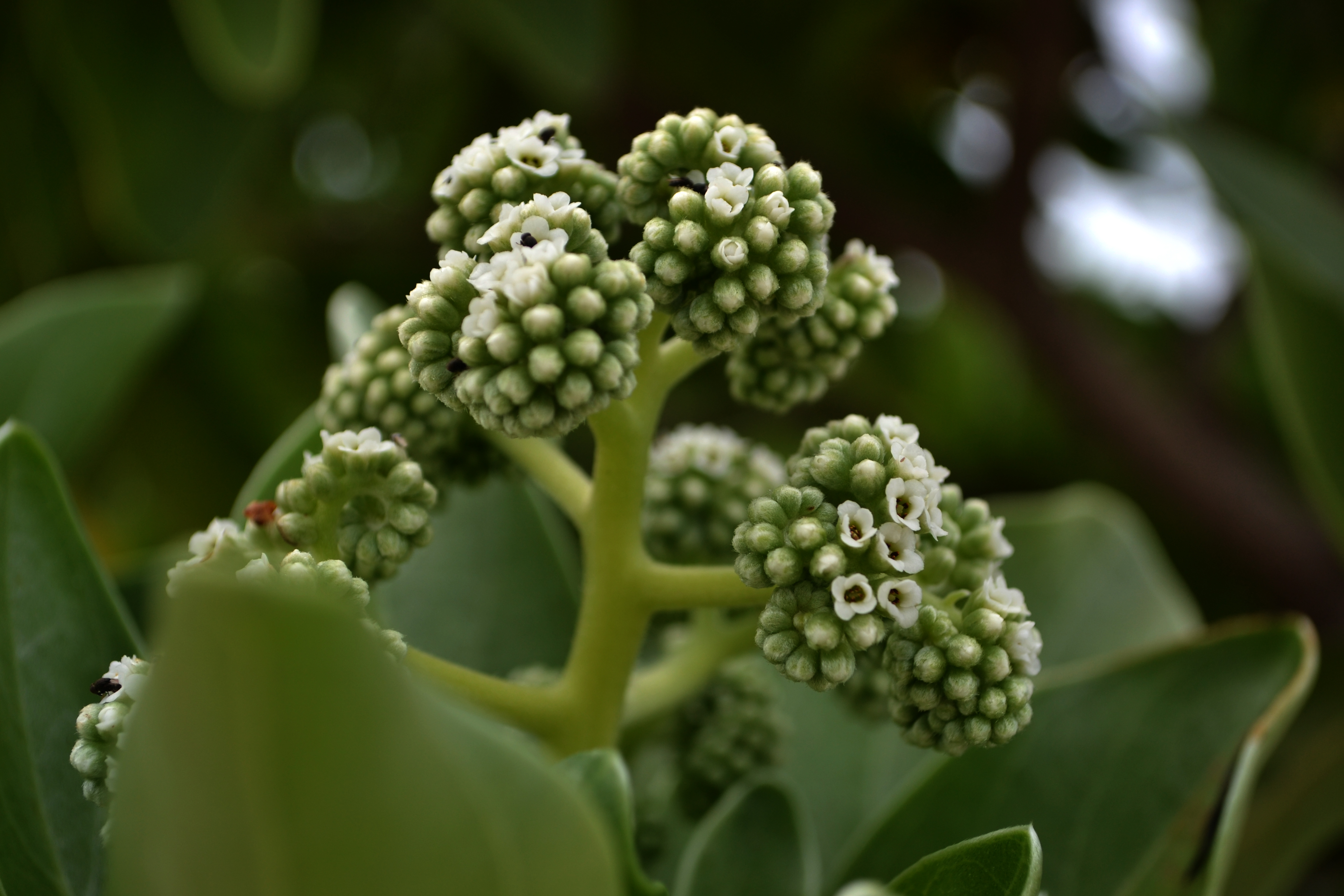
Flower

== Uses ==
=== Wood ===
The wood of H. arboreum is commonly used to make handicrafts, tools, and, in Polynesia, frames for swim goggles. Due to its availability, H. arboreum is used as firewood, and has become rare in some areas as a result.

=== Leaves ===
In the Marshall Islands, corpses are washed in water soaked with the leaves of the tree heliotrope to mask smells. The leaves are used as a spice on some islands, and can also be eaten raw as a salad. In Kiribati, oil from the leaves is used to make deodorant.

=== Medicinal ===
Octopus bush is used in many Pacific islands as a traditional medicine to treat ciguatera fish poisoning, which is caused by powerful ciguatoxins produced by microscopic Gambierdiscus algae. Scientists from the Institute of Research for Development (IRD) and the Louis Malarde Institute in French Polynesia and Pasteur Institute in New Caledonia are researching the plant chemistry and believe that senescent leaves contain rosmarinic acid and derivatives, which are known for its antiviral, antibacterial, antioxidant, and anti-inflammatory properties. The researchers think that rosmarinic acid removes the ciguatoxins from their sites of action, as well as being an anti-inflammatory agent.

=== Coastal protection ===
The preferred growing conditions of H. arboreum are in the littoral zone. It thrives in sandy barren soil with high drainage. It is capable of withstanding sea spray, and can grow in heavy winds. The tree is also a drought resistant variety, allowing it to survive the subtropical dry season of the South Pacific. These factors, plus the roots of H. arboreum taking hold in the sand, help stabilize the shore, mitigating coastal erosion.
