= Heliotropium argenteum =

Conservation status
- Vulnerable (IUCN 3.1)

Scientific classification
- Kingdom: Plantae
- Clade: Tracheophytes
- Clade: Angiosperms
- Clade: Eudicots
- Clade: Asterids
- Order: Boraginales
- Family: Heliotropiaceae
- Genus: Heliotropium
- Species: H. argenteum

Binomial name
- Heliotropium argenteum Willd. ex Lehm.

Synonyms
- Heliotropium lanatum Kunth

Species of flowering plant in the borage family

Heliotropium argenteum is a species of flowering plant in the family Heliotropiaceae. It is endemic to Ecuador. Its natural habitat is subtropical or tropical dry shrubland. It is threatened by habitat loss.
