= Heliotropium riebeckii =

Conservation status
- Vulnerable (IUCN 3.1)

Scientific classification
- Kingdom: Plantae
- Clade: Tracheophytes
- Clade: Angiosperms
- Clade: Eudicots
- Clade: Asterids
- Order: Boraginales
- Family: Heliotropiaceae
- Genus: Heliotropium
- Species: H. riebeckii

Binomial name
- Heliotropium riebeckii Schweinf. & Vierh.

Species of flowering plant in the borage family

Heliotropium riebeckii is a species of plant in the family Heliotropiaceae. It is endemic to the island of Socotra in Yemen. Its natural habitats are subtropical or tropical dry shrubland and subtropical or tropical wet lowland grassland.
