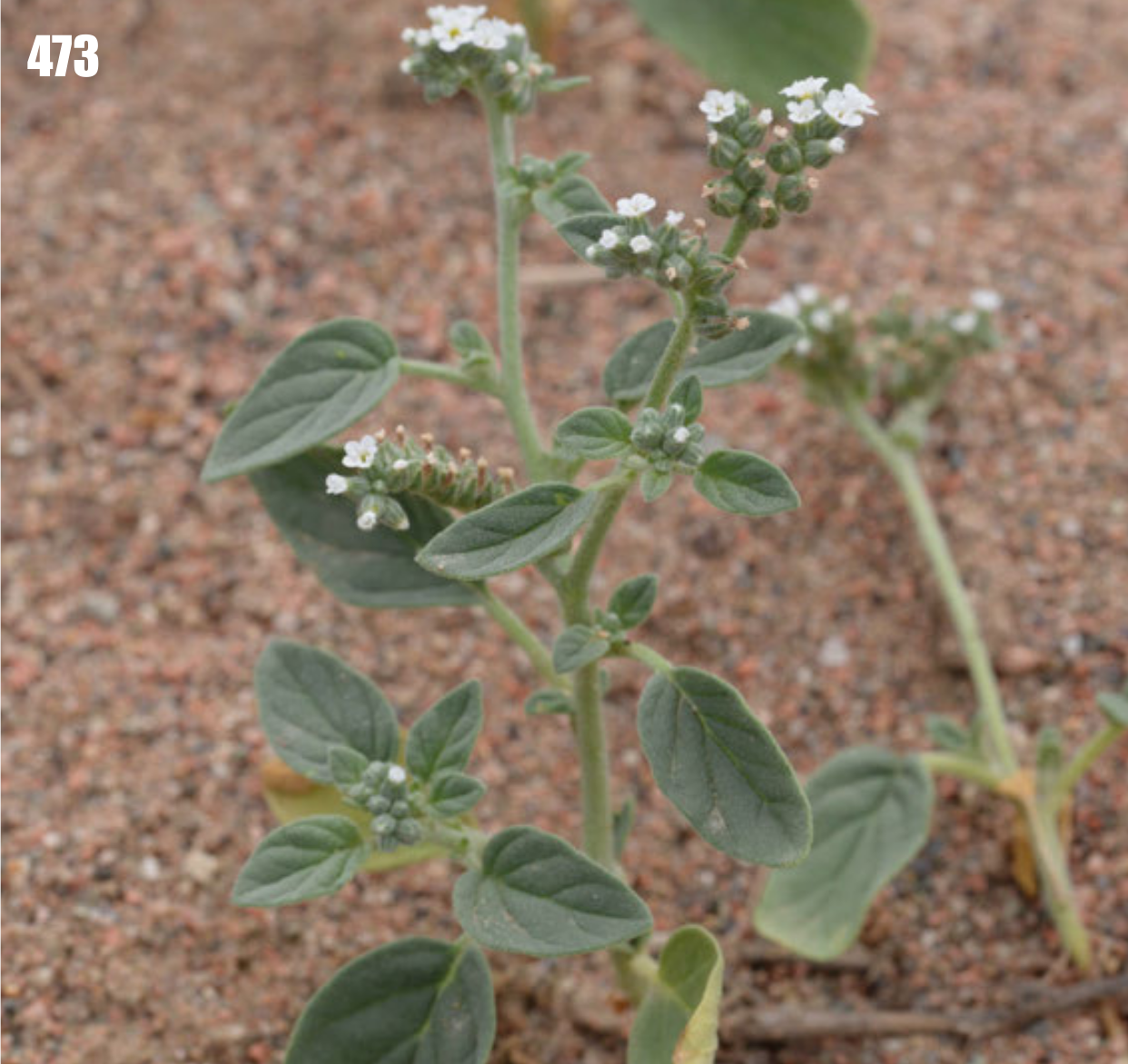

Scientific classification
- Kingdom: Plantae
- Clade: Embryophytes
- Clade: Tracheophytes
- Clade: Angiosperms
- Clade: Eudicots
- Clade: Asterids
- Order: Boraginales
- Family: Heliotropiaceae
- Genus: Heliotropium
- Species: H. ellipticum

Binomial name
- Heliotropium ellipticum Ledeb.

Synonyms
- List: Heliotropium eichwaldii Steud.; Heliotropium littorale Steven; Heliotropium parviflorum Steven ex Boiss.; Heliotropium stevenianum Andrz. ex Hohen.; Heliotropium striatum Hemsl.; Heliotropium strictum Ledeb.

= Heliotropium ellipticum =

Species of plant in the borage family

Heliotropium ellipticum is a species of flowering plant in the family Heliotropiaceae, native to Ukraine, Crimea, European Russia, the Caucasus, Turkey, Iran, Central Asia, and Pakistan. It is a weed and contaminant of cumin and other herbs and spices.
