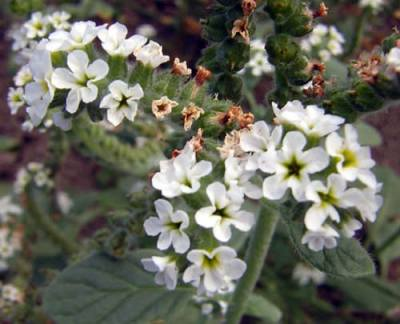

Scientific classification
- Kingdom: Plantae
- Clade: Tracheophytes
- Clade: Angiosperms
- Clade: Eudicots
- Clade: Asterids
- Order: Boraginales
- Family: Heliotropiaceae
- Genus: Heliotropium
- Species: H. europaeum

Binomial name
- Heliotropium europaeum L.

= Heliotropium europaeum =

Species of flowering plant in the borage family

Heliotropium europaeum is a species of heliotrope known by the common names European heliotrope and European turn-sole.

== Description ==
Heliotropium europaeum is an annual herb growing from a taproot and reaching maximum heights near 40 centimeters (16 in). The stem and oval-shaped leaves are covered in soft hairs. The inflorescences are coiled spikes of fragrant, white flowers with fuzzy or bristly sepals. Each flower is just a few millimeters wide. The fruit is a bumpy nutlet.

== Distribution and habitat ==
The species is native to Eurasia and North Africa, but it is widely naturalized elsewhere, such as in Australia and North America. It grows as a roadside weed in some places.

== Toxicity ==
It contains pyrrolizidine alkaloids and is poisonous.
