= Heliotropium wagneri =

Conservation status
- Vulnerable (IUCN 3.1)

Scientific classification
- Kingdom: Plantae
- Clade: Tracheophytes
- Clade: Angiosperms
- Clade: Eudicots
- Clade: Asterids
- Order: Boraginales
- Family: Heliotropiaceae
- Genus: Heliotropium
- Species: H. wagneri

Binomial name
- Heliotropium wagneri Vierh.

Species of flowering plant in the borage family

Heliotropium wagneri is a species of plant in the family Heliotropiaceae. It is endemic to the islands of Abd al Kuri and Samhah in Yemen's Socotra archipelago. Its natural habitats are subtropical or tropical dry shrubland and subtropical or tropical dry lowland grassland.
