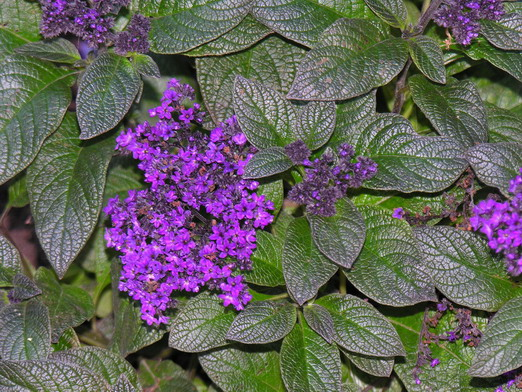
- Heliotropium arborescens

Scientific classification
- Kingdom: Plantae
- Clade: Tracheophytes
- Clade: Angiosperms
- Clade: Eudicots
- Clade: Asterids
- Order: Boraginales
- Family: Heliotropiaceae
- Genus: Heliotropium; Tourn. ex L. (1753)

Type species
- Heliotropium europaeum L.

Species
- 250-300, see text

Synonyms
- List: Beruniella Zakirov & Nabiev (1986); Bourjotia Pomel (1874); Bucanion Steven (1851); Ceballosia G.Kunkel ex Förther (1998); Cochranea Miers (1868); Dialion Raf. (1838); Eliopia Raf. (1838); Heliophytum DC. (1845); Hieranthemum Spach (1840); Lithococca Small ex Rydb. (1932); Meladendron Molina (1810); Notonerium Benth. (1876); Oskampia Raf. (1838), nom. illeg.; Parabouchetia Baill. (1887); Pentacarya DC. ex Meisn. (1840); Piptoclaina G.Don (1837); Pittonia Mill. (1754); Sarcanthus Andersson (1855); Schobera Scop. (1777); Scorpianthes Raf. (1838); Scorpiurus Heist. ex Fabr. (1763); Synzistachium Raf.(1838); Tetrandra Miq. (1858); Tiaridium Lehm. (1818); Valentina Speg. (1902), nom. illeg.; Valentiniella Speg. (1903)

= Heliotropium =

Genus of flowering plants in the borage family

Heliotropium /ˌhiːliəˈtroʊpiəm, -lioʊ-/ is a genus of flowering plants with around 325 species commonly known as heliotropes. They are highly toxic to dogs and cats, as well as to humans.

== Description ==
Like other members of the Heliotropiaceae, plants in the genus Heliotropium have 5-merous, tetracyclic flowers and actinomorphic corollas. They likewise share in their characteristic terminal styles and highly modified stigmatic heads (basal stigma, infertile apex). Species in the genus are typically herbs or subshrubs exclusively and are characterized by their dry fruits that divide into two or four mericarpids.

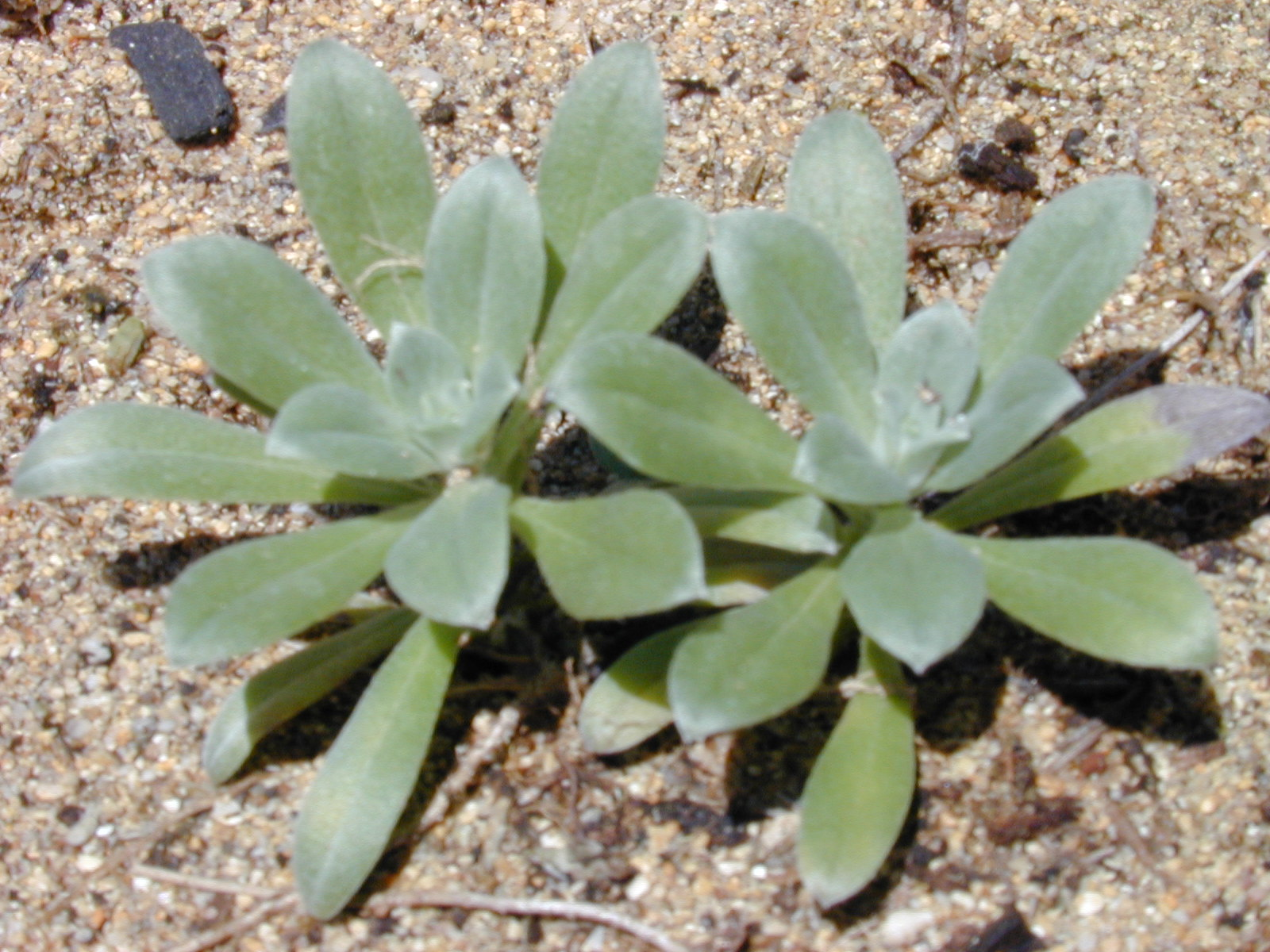
Heliotropium anomalum var. argenteum

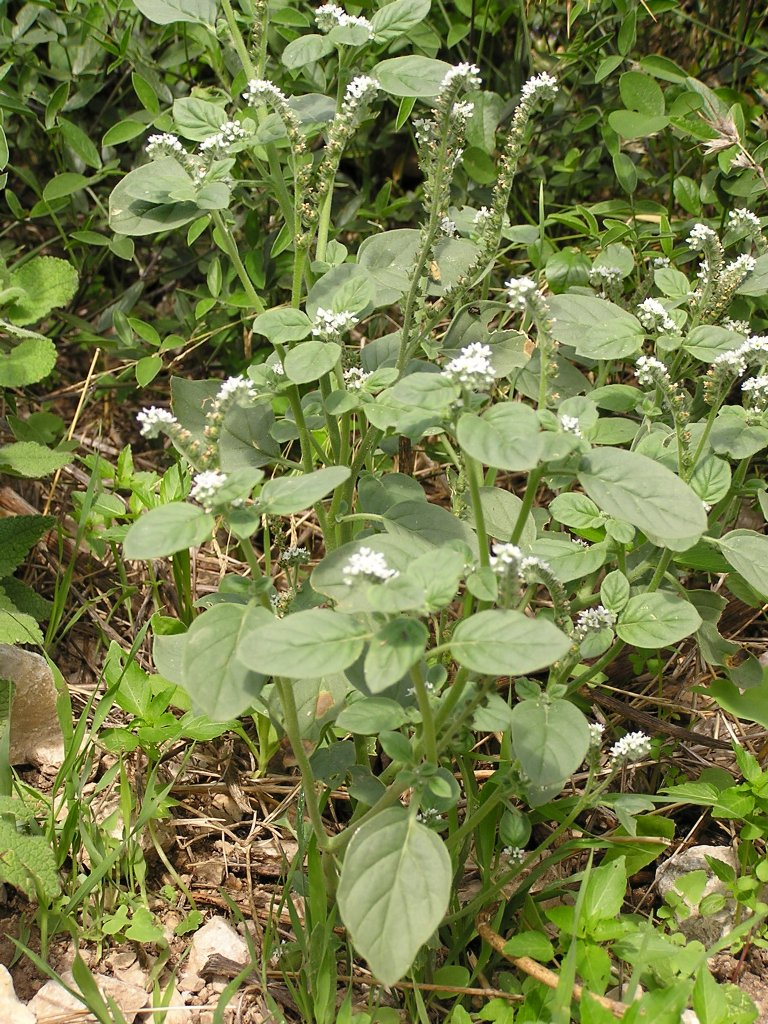
Heliotropium europaeum (European heliotrope)

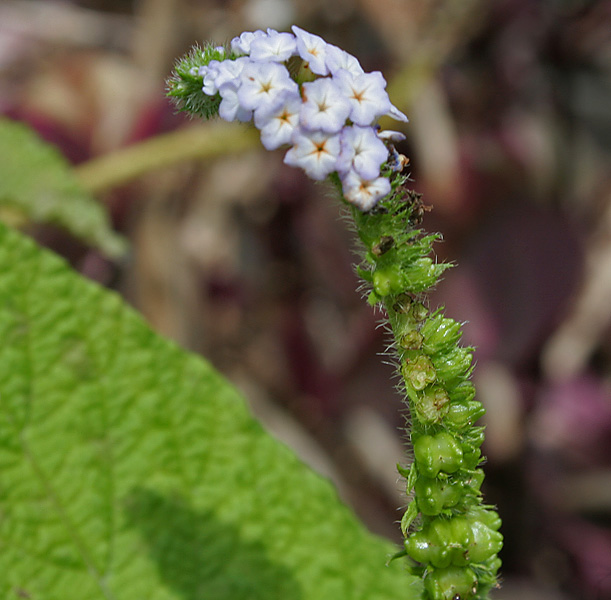
Heliotropium indicum inflorescence

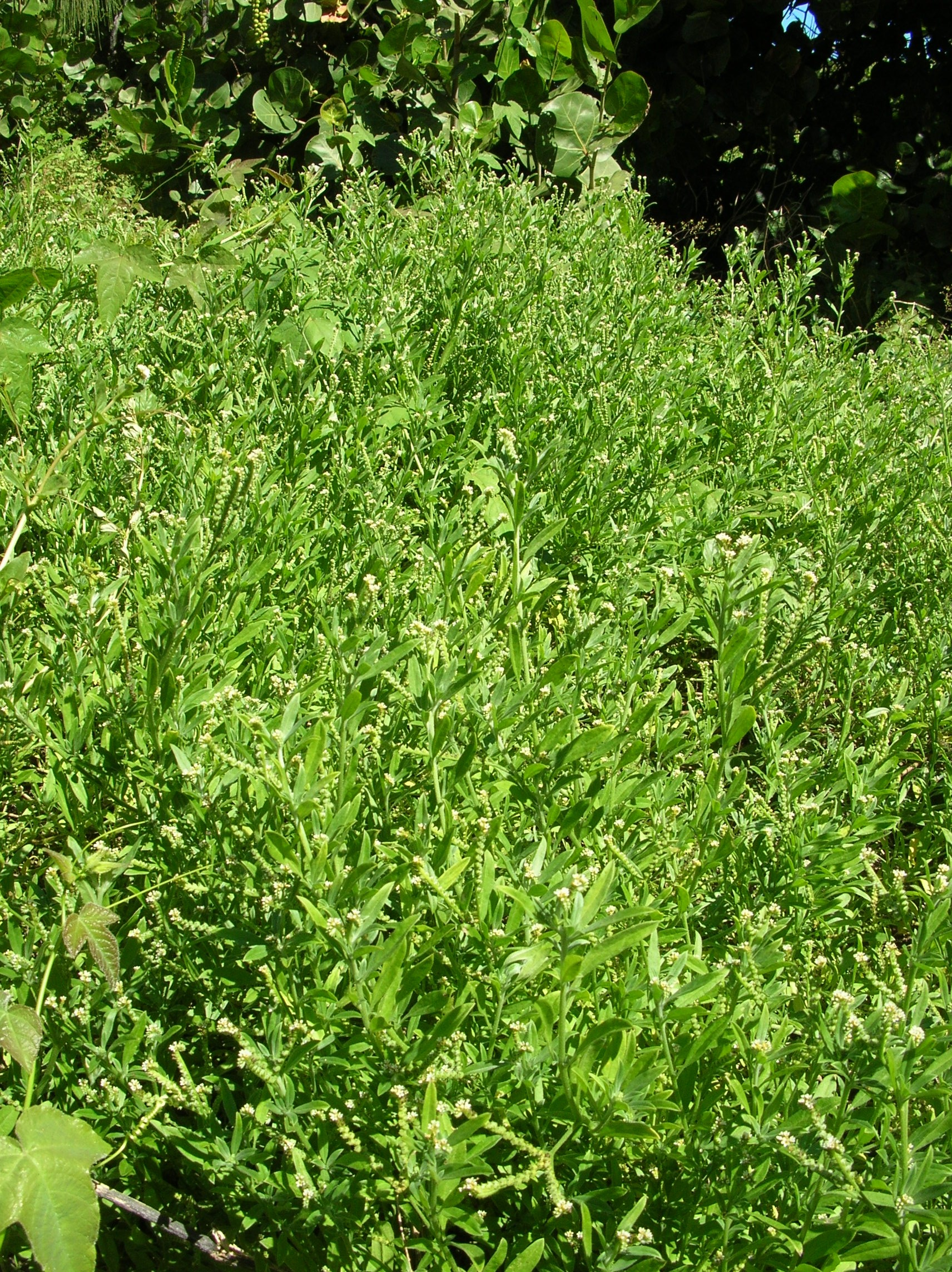
Heliotropium procumbens habit

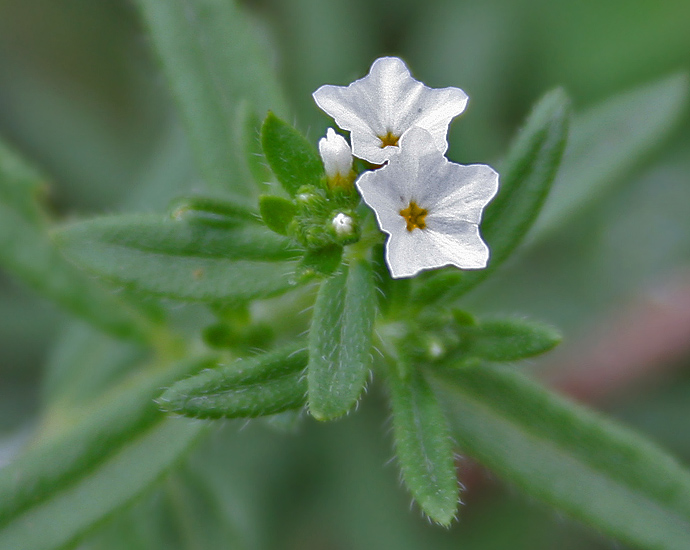
H. strigosum in India

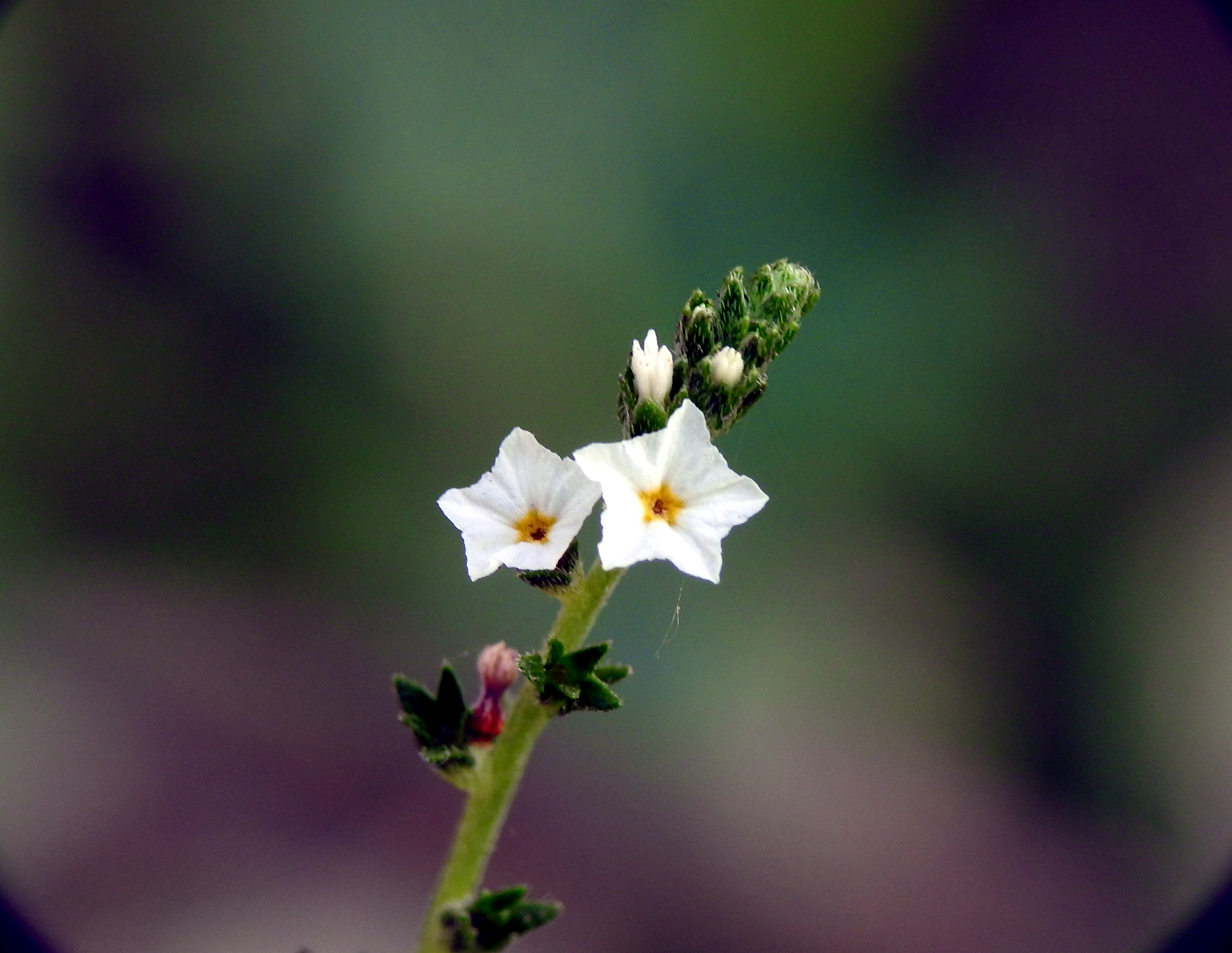
5-merosity in H. strigosum

== Taxonomy ==
Taxonomic revision supported through molecular phylogenetics led to the recognition of Euploca as genus separate from Heliotropium. In contrast, the genus Tournefortia was included in Heliotropium in a 2016 revision.

Within Heliotropium, there are four major clades:

- Heliotropium sect. Heliothamnus I.M.Johnst.
- Old World Heliotropium clade
- Heliotropium sect. Cochranea (Miers) Post & Kuntze
- Tournefortia clade, comprising Tournefortia sect. Tournefortia and all remaining New World Heliotropium species

Although traditionally included in the family Boraginaceae s.l., the genus is placed in the family Heliotropiaceae within the Boraginales order by the Boraginales Working Group.

=== Origins of diversification ===
Three of the four major clades within Heliotropium have their centers of diversity in South America. The origins of the remaining Old World Heliotropium clade can be traced back to a single colonization event from the New World. ITS1 data shows there is a single characteristic long deletion between positions 61 and 111 in the genome of the Old World species, which defines the Old World Heliotropium species and separates them from their New World counterparts. Researchers concluded this is a single autapomorphic character from a single deletion event in the past. This most reasonably explains how the whole group may have come to share this characteristic deletion when comparing the genomes of Old World and New World Heliotropium.

The most likely driver of Heliotropium diversification across the three New World clades is early Andean uplift. Researchers identified three independent diversification events in the phylogeny of Andean Heliotropium, whose timings correspond to late Miocene Andean uplift as well as the development of arid environments in South America during the Pliocene. These three diversification events each mark the separation of the Heliothamnus, Cochranea, and Tournefortia clades from the rest of Heliotropium.

Heliothamnus diversification is estimated to have taken place in the late Miocene. The age of Heliothamnus suggest that its diversification could have been triggered directly by the uplift of the Andes, something that would have promoted speciation in inner-Andean valleys and the Andean scrub. The majority of endemic Heliothamnus taxa in the region are restricted to these sorts of environments, further supporting this theory as the current leading theory explaining Heliothamnus diversification.

Before the main rise of the Andes, Cochranea and Tournefortia coinhabited the Andean region at the same time and significant speciation had not yet occurred. Once the Andes began to rise, Cochranea became isolated on the western side of the Andes while Tournefortia grew on the eastern side. This east-west division is still true of each group’s present distributions. The rise of the Andes affected the climate of the region and is believed to have contributed to the hyperaridity of the Atacama Desert, something that could have acted as an additional barrier to filter out other Heliotropium species into the range of Cochranea, thus promoting Cochranea speciation. Elevation differences would have also acted as barriers that helped promote speciation in Tournefortia species as many large groups within Tournefortia became well-adapted to high-elevation environments while other Heliotropium clades did not and thus could not coinhabit the same environments as Tournefortia.

=== Selected species ===
There are around 325 species in the genus.

- Heliotropium amplexicaule Vahl – clasping heliotrope, summer heliotrope, blue heliotrope
- Heliotropium anderssonii
- Heliotropium angiospermum
- Heliotropium anomalum Hook. & Arn. – Polynesian heliotrope, Pacific heliotrope (Pacific Islands)
  - Heliotropium anomalum var. argenteum – hinahina kū kahakai (Hawaii)
- Heliotropium arborescens – garden heliotrope, common heliotrope, cherry pie
- Heliotropium argenteum
- Heliotropium asperrimum R.Br.
- Heliotropium balfourii
- Heliotropium bracteatum R.Br.
- Heliotropium conocarpum F.Muell. ex Benth.
- Heliotropium crispatum F.Muell. ex Benth.
- Heliotropium diversifolium F.Muell. ex Benth.
- Heliotropium chenopodiaceum (A.DC.) Clos.
- Heliotropium claussenii DC.
- Heliotropium curassavicum L. – seaside heliotrope, salt heliotrope, monkey tail, quail plant, Chinese parsley; cola de mico (Spanish)
- Heliotropium dentatum
- Heliotropium derafontense
- Heliotropium ellipticum
- Heliotropium epacrideum F.Muell. ex Benth.
- Heliotropium europaeum L. – European heliotrope, European turnsole (Europe, Asia, and North Africa)
- Heliotropium fasciculatum R.Br.
- Heliotropium flintii F.Muell. ex A.S.Mitch.
- Heliotropium foertherianum Diane & Hilger – tree heliotrope, velvet soldierbush, octopus bush (South Asia, East Asia, Melanesia, western Polynesia, northern Australia)
- Heliotropium foliatum R.Br.
- Heliotropium glabellum R.Br.
- Heliotropium heteranthum (F.Muell.) Ewart & O.B.Davies
- Heliotropium indicum L. – Indian turnsole
- Heliotropium keralense Sivar. & Manilal
- Heliotropium kuriense
- Heliotropium laceolatum Loefg.
- Heliotropium lineariifolium Phil.
- Heliotropium megalanthumn I.M.Johnst.
- Heliotropium nigricans
- Heliotropium paniculatum R.Br.
- Heliotropium pannifolium – St. Helena heliotrope (Saint Helena) (extinct, c. 1820)
- Heliotropium pauciflorum R.Br.
- Heliotropium paulayanum
- Heliotropium pleiopterum F.Muell.
- Heliotropium popovii
- Heliotropium prostratum R.Br.
- Heliotropium ramosissimum
- Heliotropium riebeckii
- Heliotropium shoabense
- Heliotropium sinuatum (Miers) I.M.Johnst.
- Heliotropium socotranum
- Heliotropium stenophyllum
- Heliotropium strigosum Willd.
- Heliotropium tenellum
- Heliotropium ventricosum R.Br.
- Heliotropium wagneri
- Heliotropium aff. wagneri (Samhah, Yemen)

==== Formerly included here ====
- Chrozophora tinctoria (as H. tricoccum)
- Tournefortia gnaphalodes (L.) R.Br. ex Roem. & Schult. (as H. gnaphalodes L.)

=== Etymology ===
The name "heliotrope" derives from the old idea that the inflorescences of these plants turned their rows of flowers to the Sun. Ἥλιος (helios) is Greek for "Sun", τρέπειν (trepein) means "to turn". The Middle English name "turnsole" has the same meaning.

== Distribution and habitat ==
The genus has an almost cosmopolitan distribution.

== Ecology ==
Some danaine butterflies, such as male queen butterflies, visit these plants, being attracted to their pyrrolizidine alkaloids.

Caterpillars of the grass jewel (Freyeria trochylus), a gossamer-winged butterfly, feed on H. strigosum.

== Toxicity ==
The plants are highly toxic to dogs and cats, as well as to humans.

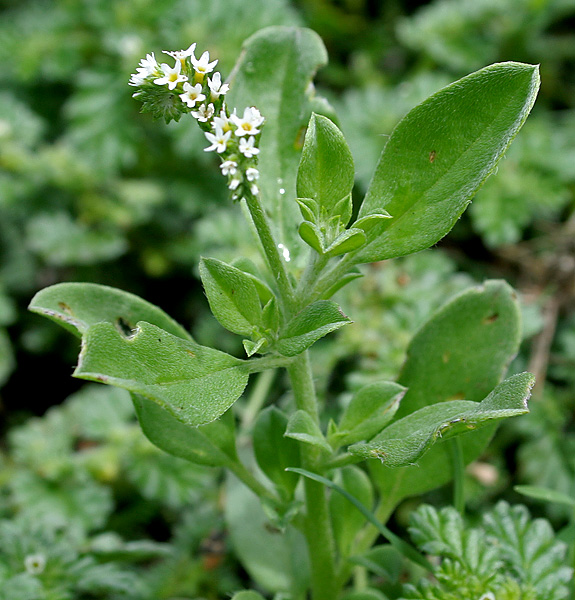
H. ovalifolium in India

Some species are weeds, and many are hepatotoxic if eaten due to abundant pyrrolizidine alkaloids. There have been cases of canine death due to over-ingestion of this toxic plant. Though it is not palatable and most animals will completely ignore it, there have been cases of horses, swine and cattle being poisoned due to contamination of hay.

=== Heliotrine and heliotridine ===
Seeds of the Heliotropium genus were discovered in the 1940s and 50s to be responsible for liver disease in populations that consumed them in large quantities, either inadvertently (as a contaminant of food crops) or deliberately (associated with the ingestion of herbal infusions for the treatment of certain ailments). The seeds contained high concentrations of pyrrolizidine alkaloids, identified mainly as the N-oxide of heliotrine (74%), and one or two other compounds similar in character to lasiocarpine. More recently, in 1993 and 2017, there have been reported cases of poisoning in Tajikistan from wheat contaminated with H. lasiocarpum seeds.

== Uses ==
Heliotropes are popular garden plants, most notably H. arborescens (garden heliotrope). Garden heliotrope is grown in Southern Europe as an ingredient for perfume. Heliotrope is the main ingredient in perfumes such as Byredo Heliotropia, Molinard Heliotrope, Etro Heliotrope, Fragonard Héliotrope Gingembre and others.

The sap of heliotrope flowers, namely of H. europaeum (European heliotrope), was used as a food coloring in Middle Ages and Early Modern French cuisine.

== In culture ==
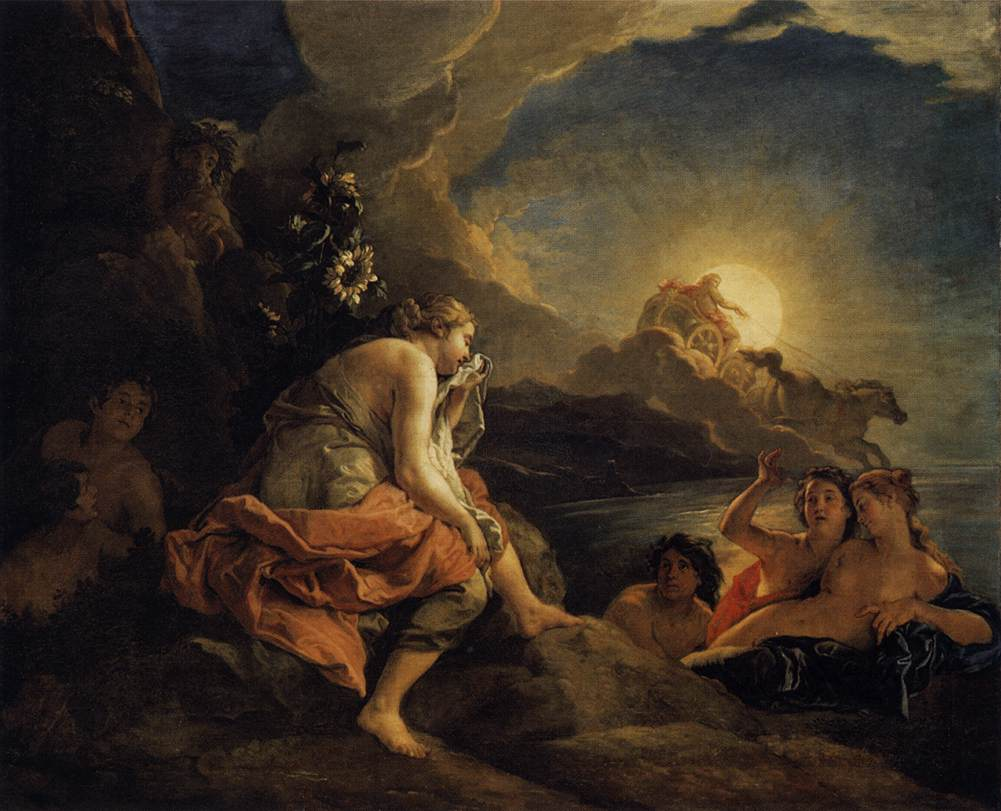
Clytie Transformed into a Sunflower, Charles de la Fosse, oil on canvas, 1688

A Classical myth, told in Ovid's Metamorphoses, imagines that the water nymph Clytie, in love with the sun god Helios, was scorned by him. Wasting away and refusing to eat or drink, she transformed into the heliotrope, whose flowers supposedly always face the Sun.

One of the most famous ragtime piano melodies is "Heliotrope Bouquet", composed in 1907 by Louis Chauvin (the first two strains) and Scott Joplin (the last two strains).

The purplish facial rash of dermatomyositis is called "heliotrope rash" because it resembles E. arborescens.

== See also ==
- Turnsole
- Heliotrope (disambiguation)
