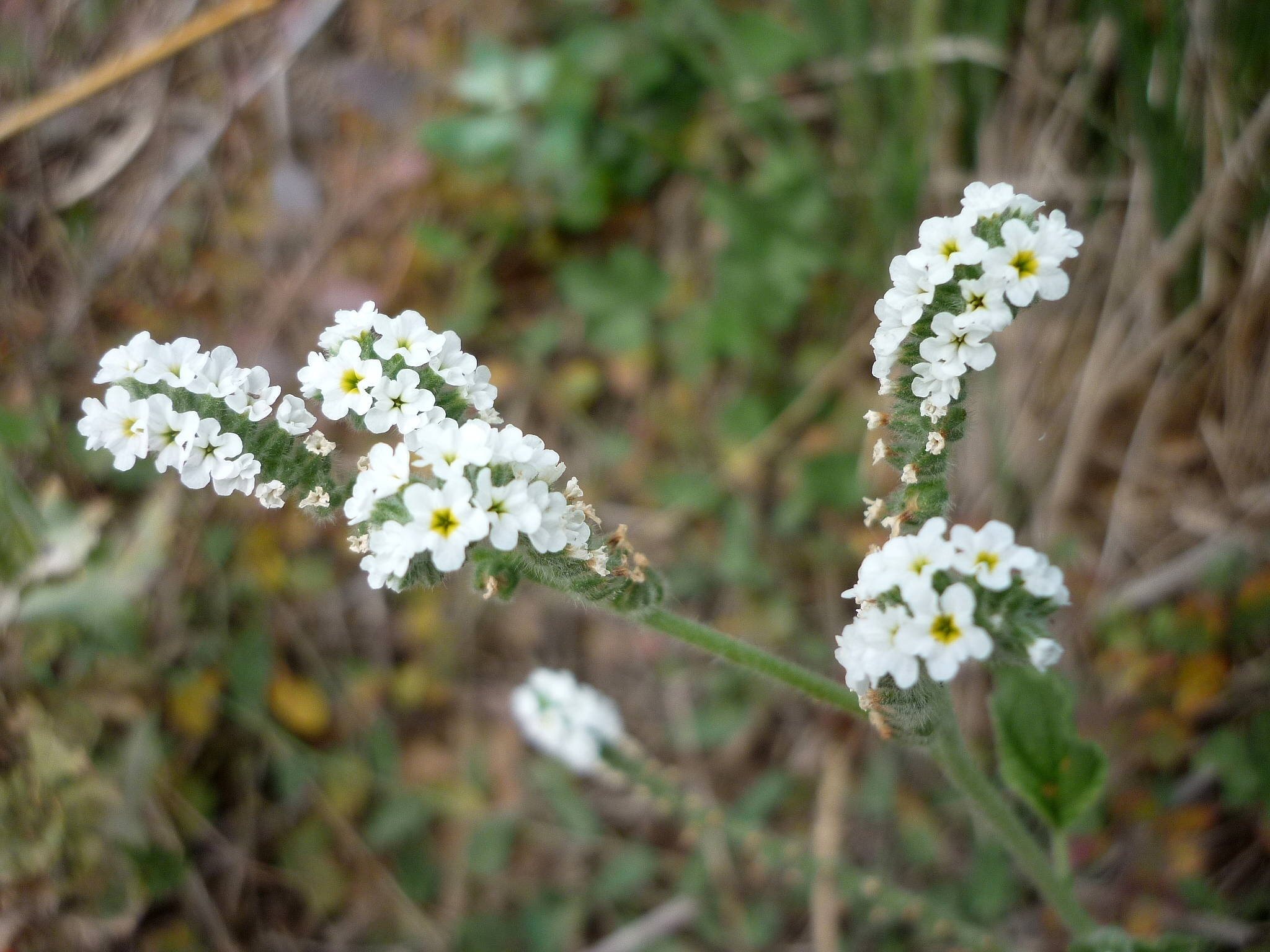
- Heliotropium europaeum

Scientific classification
- Kingdom: Plantae
- Clade: Tracheophytes
- Clade: Angiosperms
- Clade: Eudicots
- Clade: Asterids
- Order: Boraginales
- Family: Heliotropiaceae; Schrad.

Genera
- See text.

= Heliotropiaceae =

Family of plants

Heliotropiaceae are a cosmopolitan family of flowering plants with approximately 450 species worldwide, though it is concentrated especially in the tropics and subtropics.

== Description ==
In broad terms, members of the Heliotropiaceae are quite diverse in that they can be small trees, lianas, shrubs, sub-shrubs, or even perennial or annual herbs. However they all have 5-merous, tetracyclic flowers and actinomorphic corollas. These plants are also characterized by their terminal styles and highly modified stigmatic heads (basal stigma, infertile apex) as well as by their fruits (one or two-seeded mericarpids or drupes). Their conical stigmatic heads are unique and are thus a recognizable synapomorphy for this family. Heliotropiaceae mostly have distinctly scorpioid cymose inflorescences.

== Taxonomy ==
In a 2014 phylogenetic study, Ixorhea was sister to Euploca and Myriopus. Together they form a clade sister to Heliotropium, which comprises four major clades: Heliotropium sect. Heliothamnus I.M.Johnst., Old World Heliotropium, Heliotropium sect. Cochranea (Miers) Post & Kuntze, and the Tournefortia-clade, the latter comprising Tournefortia sect. Tournefortia and all remaining New World species of Heliotropium.

=== History ===
Prior to a 2016 revision, Heliotropiaceae were considered a subfamily of the Boraginaceae: Heliotropioideae. Even before that, however, there was already some indication in the field that Heliotropiaceae deserved to be recognized as an independent family. Anatomically, the presence of anatropous ovules in Heliotropiaceae as well as the presence of long suspensors and endosperm haustoria in Boraginaceae drove the earliest divide between the two families in the literature. Later, molecular data collected from a variety of families in the Boraginales collectively indicated that the Hydrophyllaceae were sister to the Heliotropiaceae, something that rendered the Boraginaceae paraphyletic.

=== Genera ===
As of December 2025, World Flora Online accepted three genera:

- Euploca Nutt.
- Heliotropium L.
- Ixorhea Fenzl

It places Myriopus, which has been included in the family, in Boraginaceae.
