= Scirpus cespitosus =

Scirpus cespitosus can refer to:

- Scirpus cespitosus L., a synonym of Trichophorum cespitosum (L.) Hartm.
- Scirpus cespitosus Pollich, a synonym of Eleocharis quinqueflora (Hartmann) O.Schwarz
