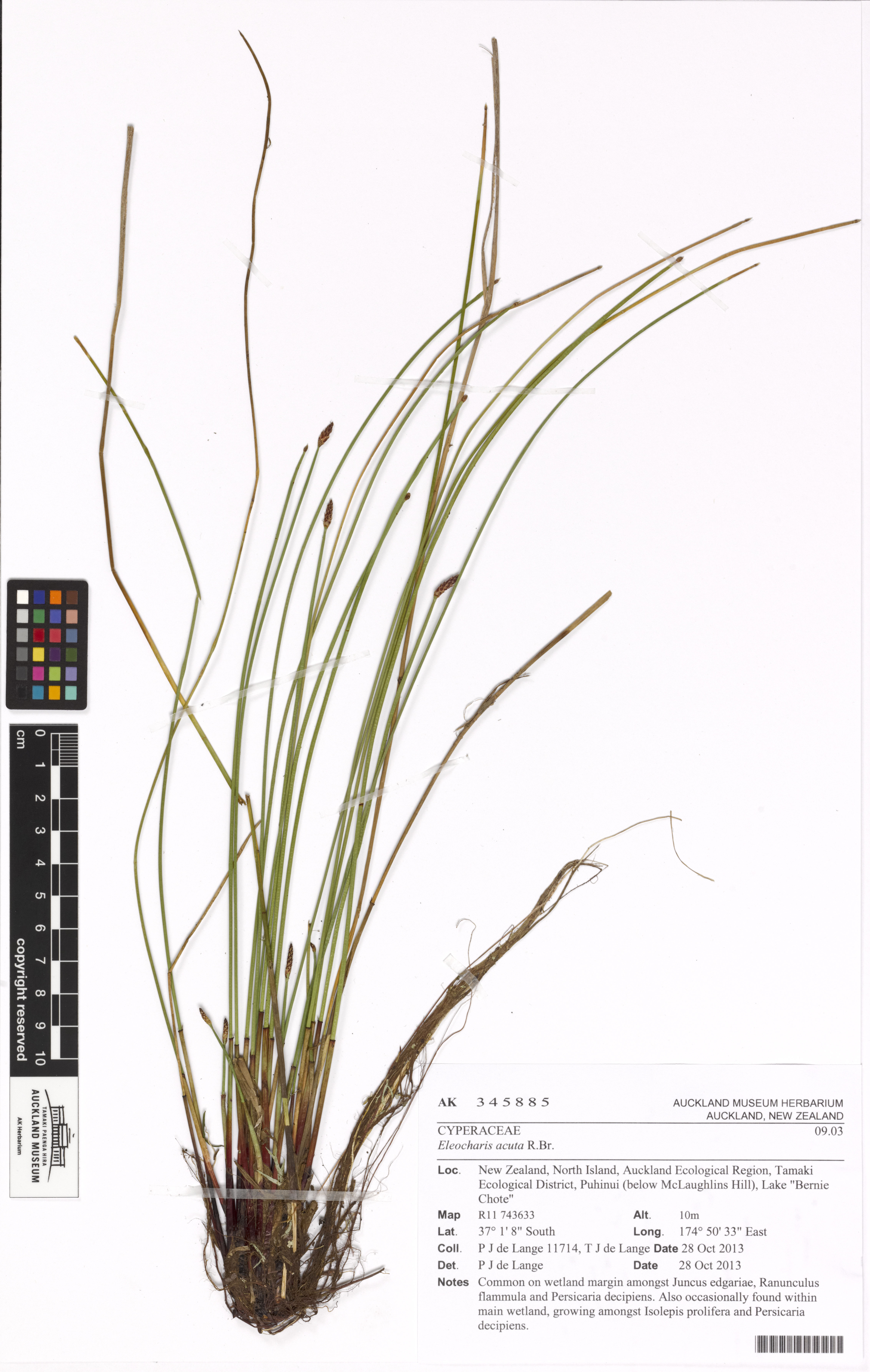

Scientific classification
- Kingdom: Plantae
- Clade: Tracheophytes
- Clade: Angiosperms
- Clade: Monocots
- Clade: Commelinids
- Order: Poales
- Family: Cyperaceae
- Genus: Eleocharis
- Species: E. acuta

Binomial name
- Eleocharis acuta R.Br.

= Eleocharis acuta =

Common spikerush

Species of plant

Eleocharis acuta, commonly known as common spikerush or small spikerush, is a sedge of the family Cyperaceae that is native to Australia.

== Description ==
The rhizomatous perennial herb to grass-like sedge typically grows to a height of 0.7 metres (2.3 ft). It blooms between September and December producing brown flowers. It has fine upright cylinder-shaped deep-green foliage that tapers to a fine point. It has tufted and terete culms that are 10 to 60 centimetres (3.9 to 23.6 in) in length with a diameter of 1 to 3 millimetres (0.039 to 0.118 in). The inflorescence is found at the tip of the spike and is composed of narrow-ovoid to narrow-cylindrical spikelets with a length of 10 to 30 mm (0.39 to 1.18 in). It will later form a shiny yellow to brown coloured nut with a plano-convex to biconvex, broad-obovoid shape that is around 1.5 to 1.7 mm (0.059 to 0.067 in) in length with a diameter of 1.1 to 1.2 mm (0.043 to 0.047 in).

== Taxonomy ==
The species was first formally described by the botanist Robert Brown in 1810 as part of the work Prodromus Florae Novae Hollandiae. The name of the species is often misapplied to Eleocharis pallens.

== Distribution and habitat ==
It is found widely through all Australian states, but not the Northern Territory. It is also found in New Zealand, New Guinea and Norfolk Island. In Western Australia it is found in and around swamps and clay pans in the Mid West, Wheatbelt, Great Southern and Goldfields-Esperance regions where it grows in sandy-peaty-clay soils.

It typically occurs in water or wet soil, seepage areas, freshwater lakes, and creek-beds.

== Uses ==
It is able to grow in stationary to slowly moving water with a range extends from the coast to many inland areas. It is used in wetland area and is habitat for waterbirds as nesting material and the seeds as a food source. The plant is sold commercially as it can form dense swards able to easily colonize shallow fresh water areas including along the edges of lagoons, dams, drainage lines and waterlogged low-lying areas.
