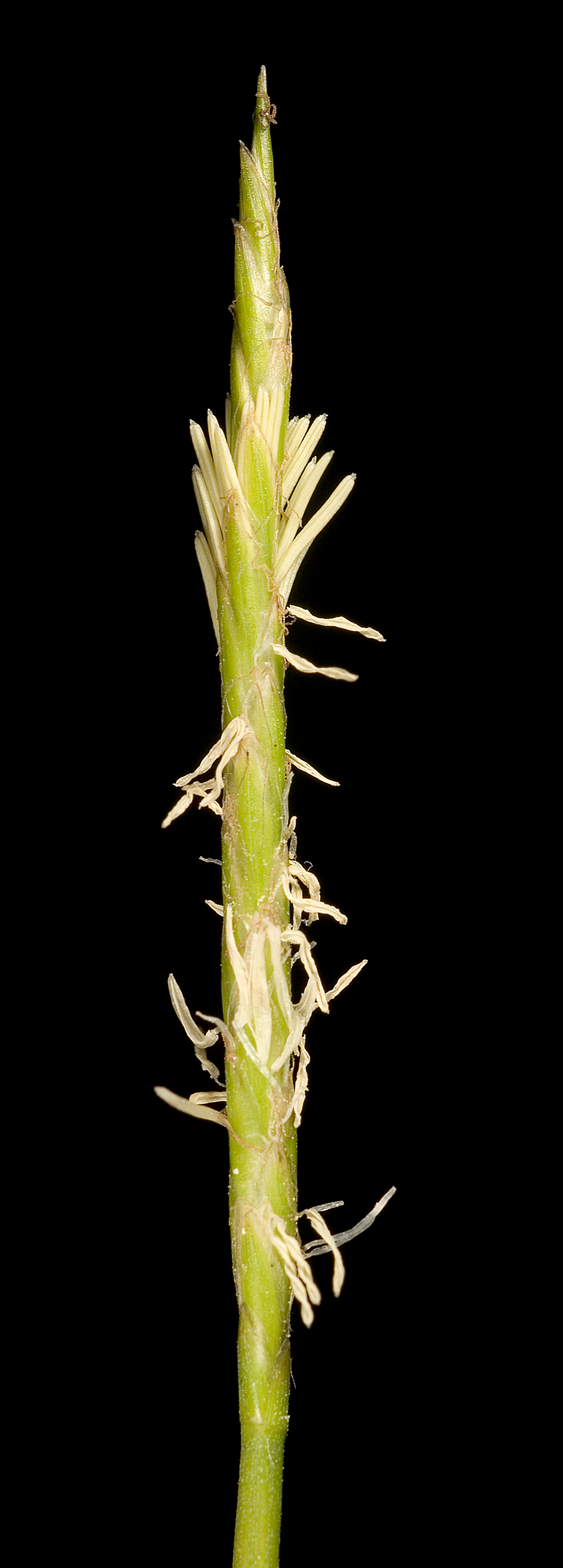

Conservation status
- Declared rare (DEC)

Scientific classification
- Kingdom: Plantae
- Clade: Tracheophytes
- Clade: Angiosperms
- Clade: Monocots
- Clade: Commelinids
- Order: Poales
- Family: Cyperaceae
- Genus: Eleocharis
- Species: E. keigheryi

Binomial name
- Eleocharis keigheryi K.L.Wilson

= Eleocharis keigheryi =

Species of grass-like plant

Eleocharis keigheryi is a sedge of the family Cyperaceae that is native to Australia.

The rhizomatousous perennial herb to grass-like sedge typically grows to a height of 0.4 metres (1.3 ft) and has a clumped habit. It blooms between August and November producing green flowers.

It is found in and around pools and swampy areas in the Wheatbelt and South West regions of Western Australia where it grows in sandy-loamy soils.

The species was first described in 1997 by Karen Wilson.
