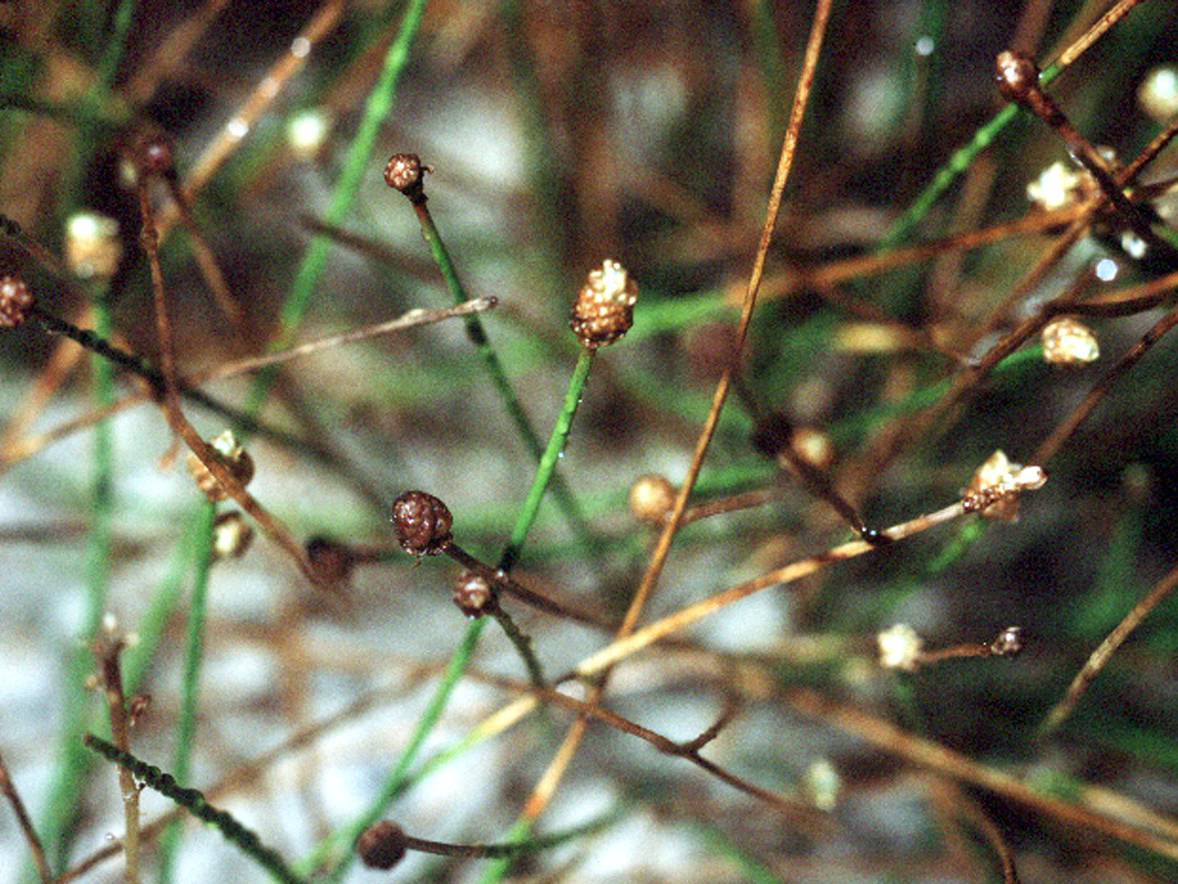

Scientific classification
- Kingdom: Plantae
- Clade: Embryophytes
- Clade: Tracheophytes
- Clade: Angiosperms
- Clade: Monocots
- Clade: Commelinids
- Order: Poales
- Family: Cyperaceae
- Genus: Eleocharis
- Species: E. parvula

Binomial name
- Eleocharis parvula (Roem. & Schult.) Link ex Bluff, Nees & Schauer

= Eleocharis parvula =

Species of grass-like plant

Eleocharis parvula is a species of spikesedge known by the common names dwarf spikerush, small spikerush and hairgrass in aquaria. It is a plant of brackish and saltwater habitat, such as marshes and mudflats. It is a perennial herb growing tufts of spongy, compressible stems not more than 10 centimeters tall. The plant grows from a tuber which is J-shaped or horseshoe-shaped, a characteristic that helps in the identification of the species. The inflorescence is an oval-shaped spikelet just 2 or 3 millimeters long, made up of several tiny flowers.

== Distribution ==
Eleocharis parvula has a disjunct, scattered distribution. It is widespread across much of Europe and North America (US, Canada, Mexico, Central America), with additional populations in the Russian Far East, Japan, Hainan, Java, Vietnam, Kazakhstan, Uzbekistan, Venezuela, Cuba, and Brazil.
