= Eleocharis pusilla =

Scientific classification
- Kingdom: Plantae
- Clade: Tracheophytes
- Clade: Angiosperms
- Clade: Monocots
- Clade: Commelinids
- Order: Poales
- Family: Cyperaceae
- Genus: Eleocharis
- Species: E. pusilla

Binomial name
- Eleocharis pusilla R.Br.

Species of grass-like plant

Eleocharis pusilla is a sedge of the family Cyperaceae that is native to Australia.

The annual herb to grass-like sedge typically grows to a height of 0.02 to 0.15 metres (0.07 to 0.49 ft) and has a tufted habit. It blooms between August and September producing white flowers.

It is found in the Kimberley region of Western Australia where it grows in red loamy-sandy soils around granite.
