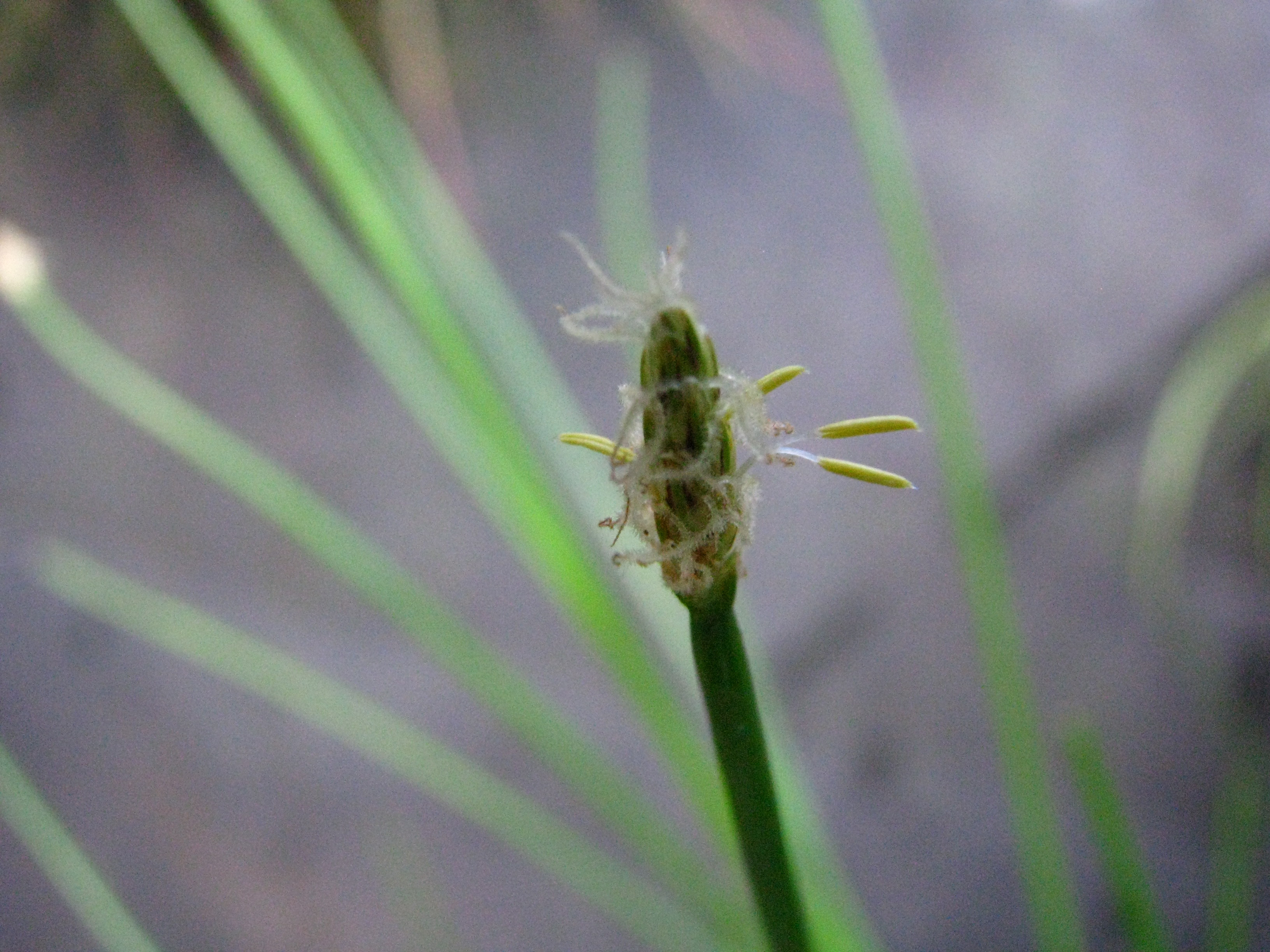
- Inflorescence
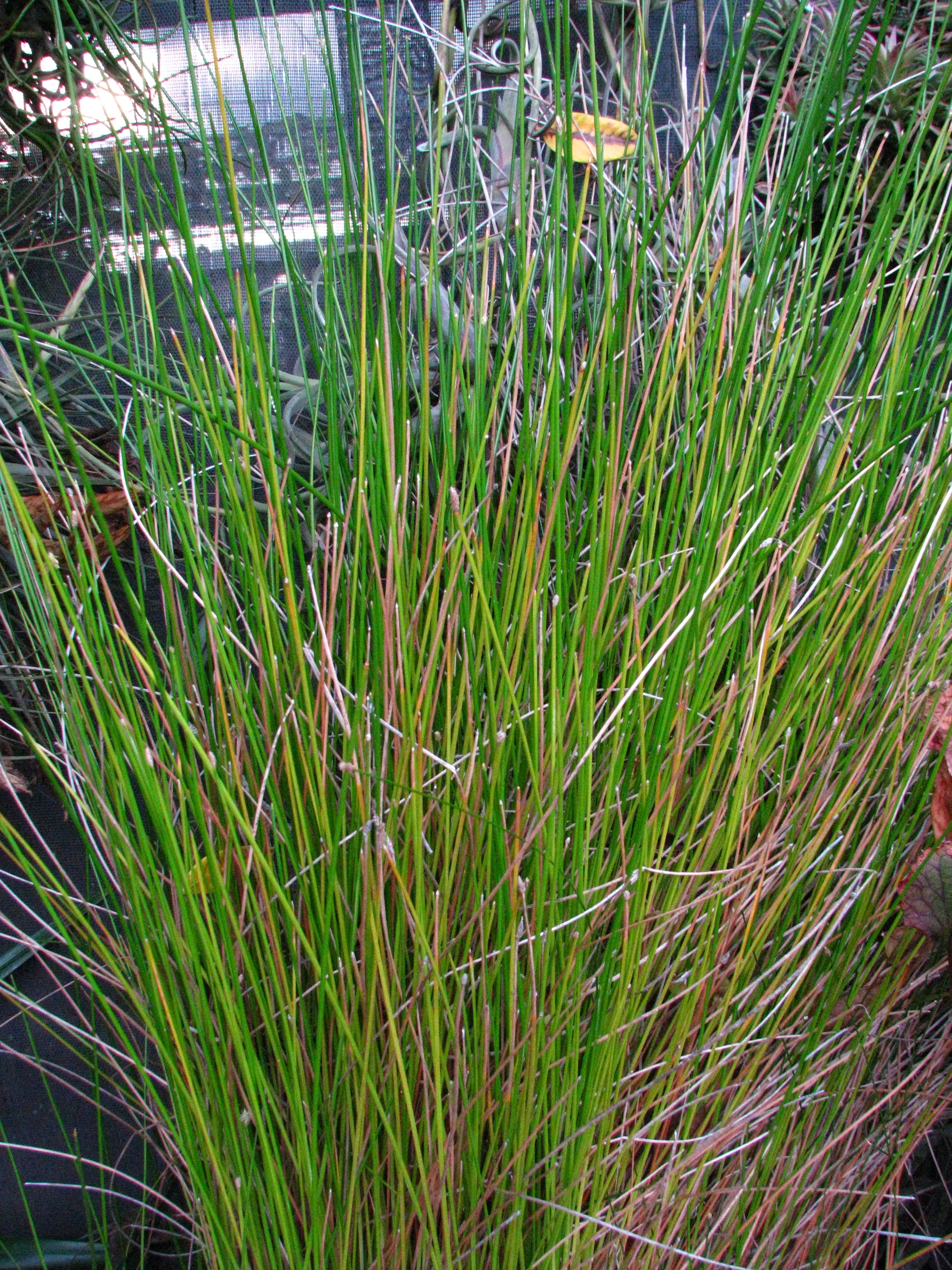
- Habit

Conservation status
- Least Concern (IUCN 3.1)

Scientific classification
- Kingdom: Plantae
- Clade: Tracheophytes
- Clade: Angiosperms
- Clade: Monocots
- Clade: Commelinids
- Order: Poales
- Family: Cyperaceae
- Genus: Eleocharis
- Species: E. erythropoda

Binomial name
- Eleocharis erythropoda Steud.

Synonyms
- List: Eleocharis calva (A.Gray) Torr. ex Fernald & Brackett; Eleocharis calva var. australis (Nees) H.St.John; Eleocharis palustris var. australis Nees; Eleocharis palustris var. calva A.Gray; Eleocharis palustris subvar. calva (A.Gray) Farw.; Scirpus glaucus Torr.; Scirpus nudissimus Steud. & Jard.; Trichophyllum palustre var. calvum (A.Gray) House

= Eleocharis erythropoda =

Species of plant

Eleocharis erythropoda, the bald spikerush, is a species of flowering plant in the family Cyperaceae. It is native to the Hawaiian Islands, and most of the United States (except California, Nevada, South Carolina, and Florida) and Canada (except Nunavut, Labrador, and Nova Scotia). A mat-forming perennial reaching 0.8 m (32 in), it is an obligate wetland species found from sea level up to 2,300 m (7,500 ft). It has been assessed as Least Concern.
