= Eleocharis bolanderi =

Scientific classification
- Kingdom: Plantae
- Clade: Tracheophytes
- Clade: Angiosperms
- Clade: Monocots
- Clade: Commelinids
- Order: Poales
- Family: Cyperaceae
- Genus: Eleocharis
- Species: E. bolanderi

Binomial name
- Eleocharis bolanderi A.Gray

Synonyms
- Eleocharis montevidensis var. bolanderi (A.Gray) V.E.Grant

Species of grass-like plant

Eleocharis bolanderi, commonly known as Bolander's spikerush, is a species of spikesedge. It is native to the western United States from Colorado west to Oregon and California. It grows in wet spots in several types of habitat, including mountain meadows and springs. It is a rhizomatous perennial herb producing erect, hairless stems 10 to 30 centimeters tall. The narrow, wispy leaves often have purple or reddish speckles and purplish tinting around the bases. The inflorescence is an oval-shaped spikelet at the tip of the stem under a centimeter long and made up of several dark brown, sometimes purple-tinged flowers.
