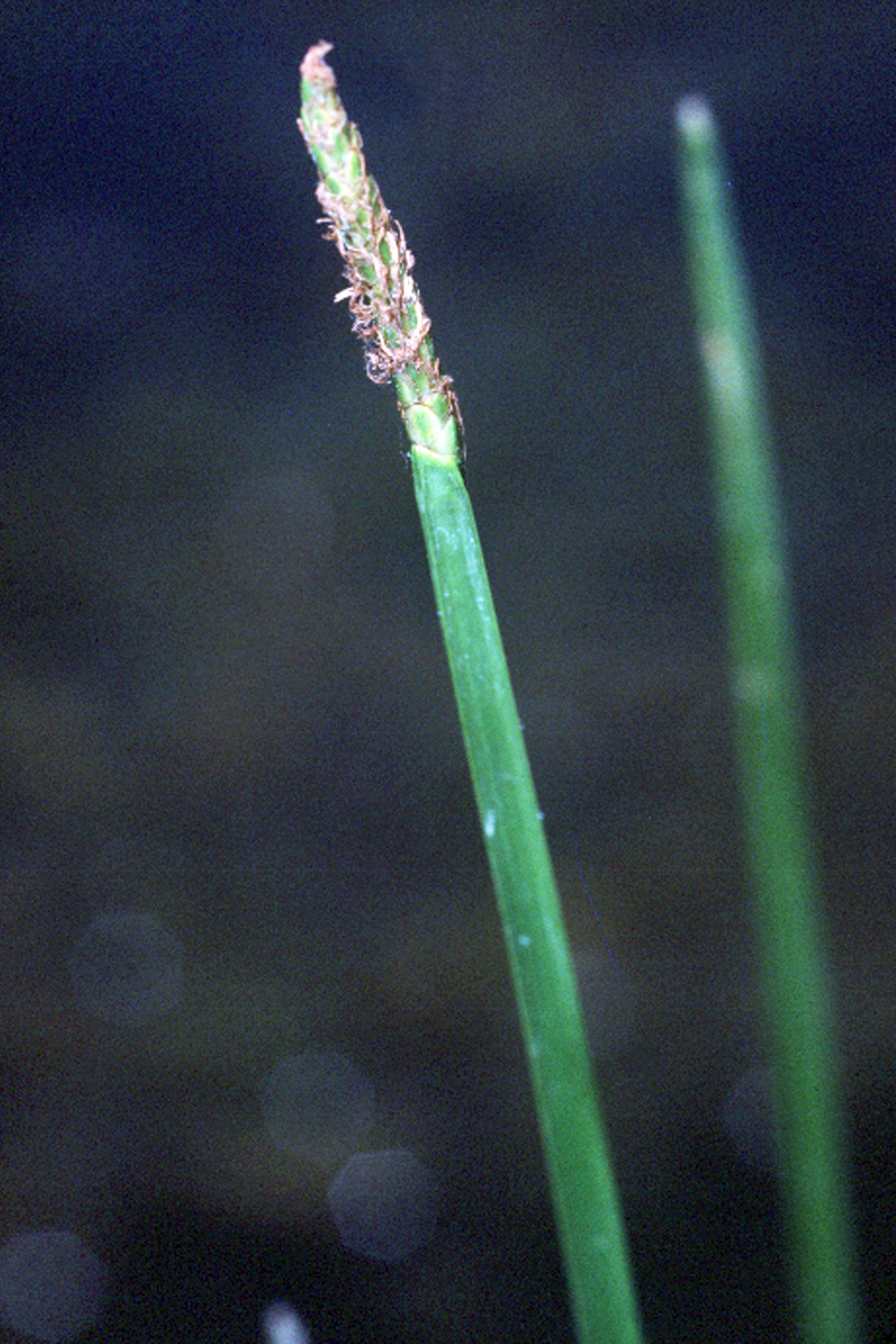

Scientific classification
- Kingdom: Plantae
- Clade: Tracheophytes
- Clade: Angiosperms
- Clade: Monocots
- Clade: Commelinids
- Order: Poales
- Family: Cyperaceae
- Genus: Eleocharis
- Species: E. quadrangulata

Binomial name
- Eleocharis quadrangulata (Michx.) Roem. & Schult.

Synonyms
- Scirpus quadrangulatus Michx.; Limnochloa quadrangulata (Michx.) Nees.; Eleocharis quadrangulata var. typica Fernald; Eleocharis quadrangulata var. crassior Fernald

= Eleocharis quadrangulata =

Species of grass-like plant

Eleocharis quadrangulata is a species of spikesedge known by the common names square-stem spikerush and four-angled spikerush. It is native to eastern and central North America (from Texas and Florida north to Ontario and Massachusetts), with additional populations in California, Oregon, and west-central Mexico (Durango, Jalisco, etc.). It grows in and around freshwater in lakes, ponds, and other bodies of water. It is a rhizomatous perennial herb growing one half to one meter in height. The spongy, compressible stem is a few millimeters wide and sharply four-angled. The inflorescence is a single spikelet 1.5 to 7.5 centimeters long which is made up of several flowers covered in light brown bracts.
