= Eleocharis triquetra =

Scientific classification
- Kingdom: Plantae
- Clade: Tracheophytes
- Clade: Angiosperms
- Clade: Monocots
- Clade: Commelinids
- Order: Poales
- Family: Cyperaceae
- Genus: Eleocharis
- Species: E. triquetra

Binomial name
- Eleocharis triquetra K.L.Wilson

Species of grass-like plant

Eleocharis triquetra is a sedge of the family Cyperaceae that is native to the Kimberley region of Western Australia.

The species was first described in 2011 by Karen Wilson.
