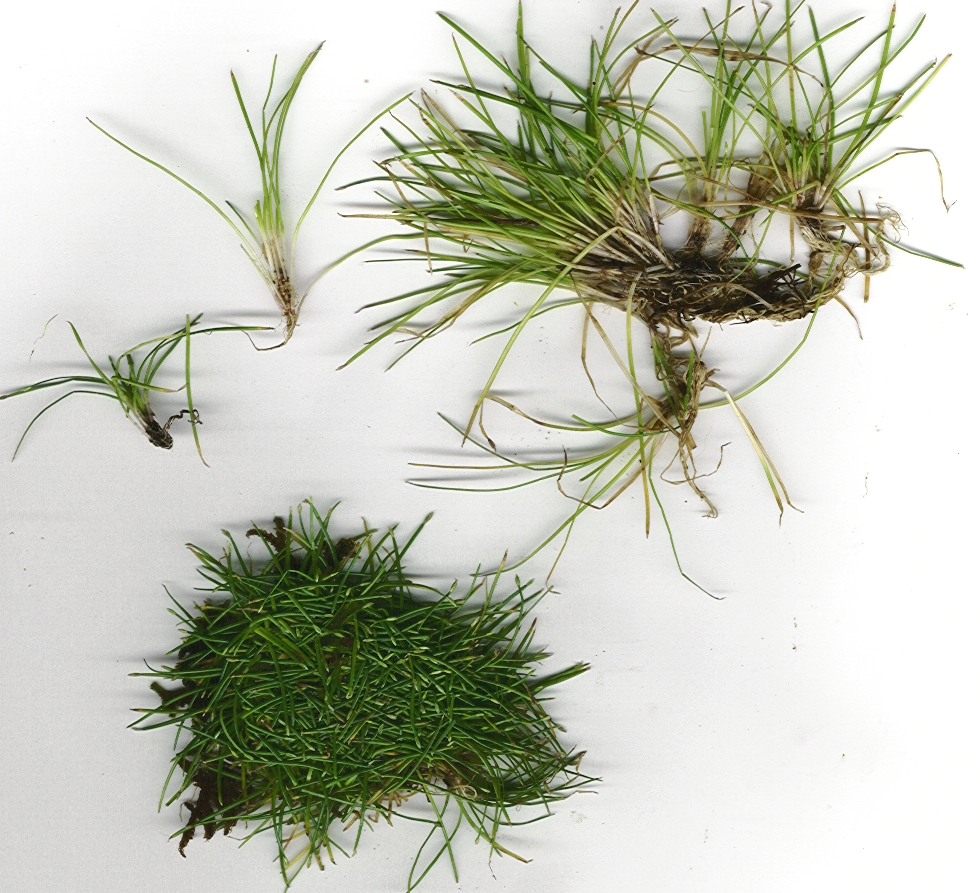

Scientific classification
- Kingdom: Plantae
- Clade: Tracheophytes
- Clade: Angiosperms
- Clade: Monocots
- Clade: Commelinids
- Order: Poales
- Family: Cyperaceae
- Genus: Eleocharis
- Species: E. radicans

Binomial name
- Eleocharis radicans (Poir.) Kunth

Synonyms
- Eleocharis lindheimeri

= Eleocharis radicans =

Species of plant

Eleocharis radicans is a species of spikesedge known by the common name rooted spikerush. This aquatic or semi-aquatic plant is native to the Americas as far north as Virginia and northern California. It grows in wet places such as streams, lakes, bogs, and moist meadows, where it roots on soaked ground or floats in the water. This is a rhizomatous, mat-forming perennial with thread-thin, spongy stems. It may have several thin leaves. The stems are topped with papery spikelets about half a centimeter long at maximum size and containing 4 to 12 flowers, each covered with a light-colored bract. The fruit is a minute white or yellow achene less than a millimeter long.
