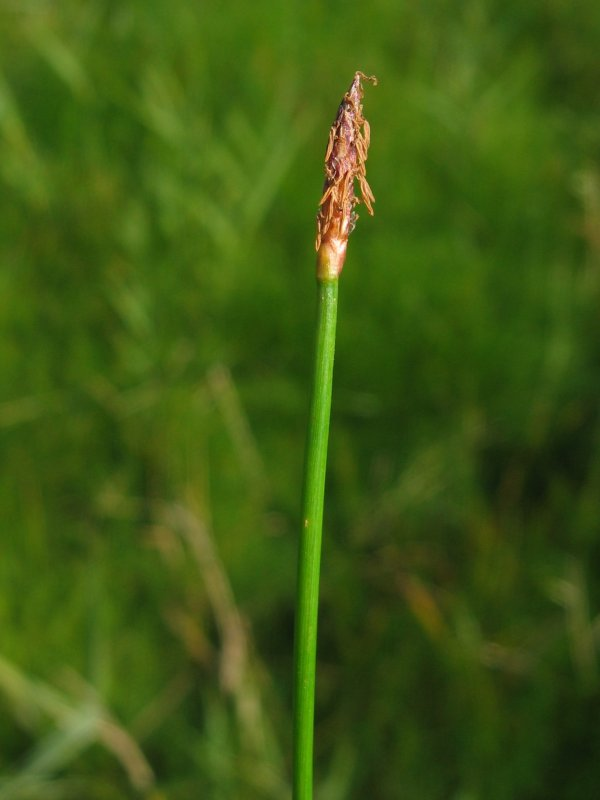

Scientific classification
- Kingdom: Plantae
- Clade: Tracheophytes
- Clade: Angiosperms
- Clade: Monocots
- Clade: Commelinids
- Order: Poales
- Family: Cyperaceae
- Genus: Eleocharis
- Species: E. uniglumis

Binomial name
- Eleocharis uniglumis (Link) Schult.

= Eleocharis uniglumis =

Species of grass-like plant

Eleocharis uniglumis is a species of plant belonging to the family Cyperaceae.

Its native range is Europe to Russian Far East and Nepal, Subarctic America to Northern USA.
