= Eleocharis papillosa =

Conservation status
- Priority Three — Poorly Known Taxa (DEC)

Scientific classification
- Kingdom: Plantae
- Clade: Tracheophytes
- Clade: Angiosperms
- Clade: Monocots
- Clade: Commelinids
- Order: Poales
- Family: Cyperaceae
- Genus: Eleocharis
- Species: E. papillosa

Binomial name
- Eleocharis papillosa Latz

Species of grass-like plant

Eleocharis papillosa is a sedge of the family Cyperaceae that is native to Australia.

The annual herb produces brown flowers in November.

It has a scattered population that is found in and around open clay flats and clay pans in the Mid West, Gascoyne, Pilbara and Goldfields-Esperance regions of Western Australia and grows in red clay soils over granite.
