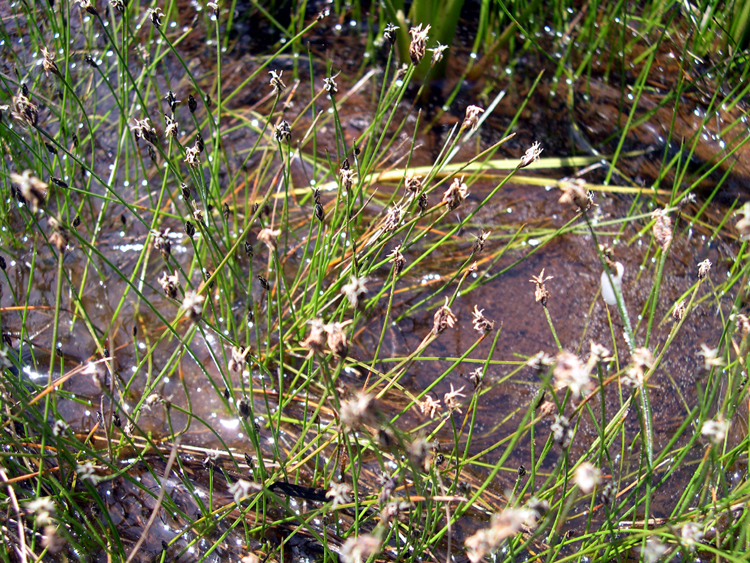

Scientific classification
- Kingdom: Plantae
- Clade: Tracheophytes
- Clade: Angiosperms
- Clade: Monocots
- Clade: Commelinids
- Order: Poales
- Family: Cyperaceae
- Genus: Eleocharis
- Species: E. pachycarpa

Binomial name
- Eleocharis pachycarpa É.Desv.

= Eleocharis pachycarpa =

Black sand spikerush

Species of grass-like plant

Eleocharis pachycarpa is a species of spikesedge known by the common name black sand spikerush. This plant is native to southern South America (Chile, Argentina, Paraguay, Uruguay) but it grows in other parts of the world as an introduced species, such as Australia and the US states of California and Nevada.

Eleocharis pachycarpa is a resident of moist areas, such as riverbanks, vernal pools, salt marshes, and wet meadows. This is a rhizomatous perennial generally not exceeding 40 centimeters in height. It forms clumps of very thin stringlike stems of smooth bright green which are four-sided or cylindrical. The stems are somewhat erect but they bend easily to become stolons; if the tip touches the substrate it may root there and produce a new plant. The spikelet is a flat oval shape up to a centimeter long and holds ten or more flowers, each covered in a dark purple-brown or black bract. The fruit is a tiny light-colored achene about a millimeter long.
