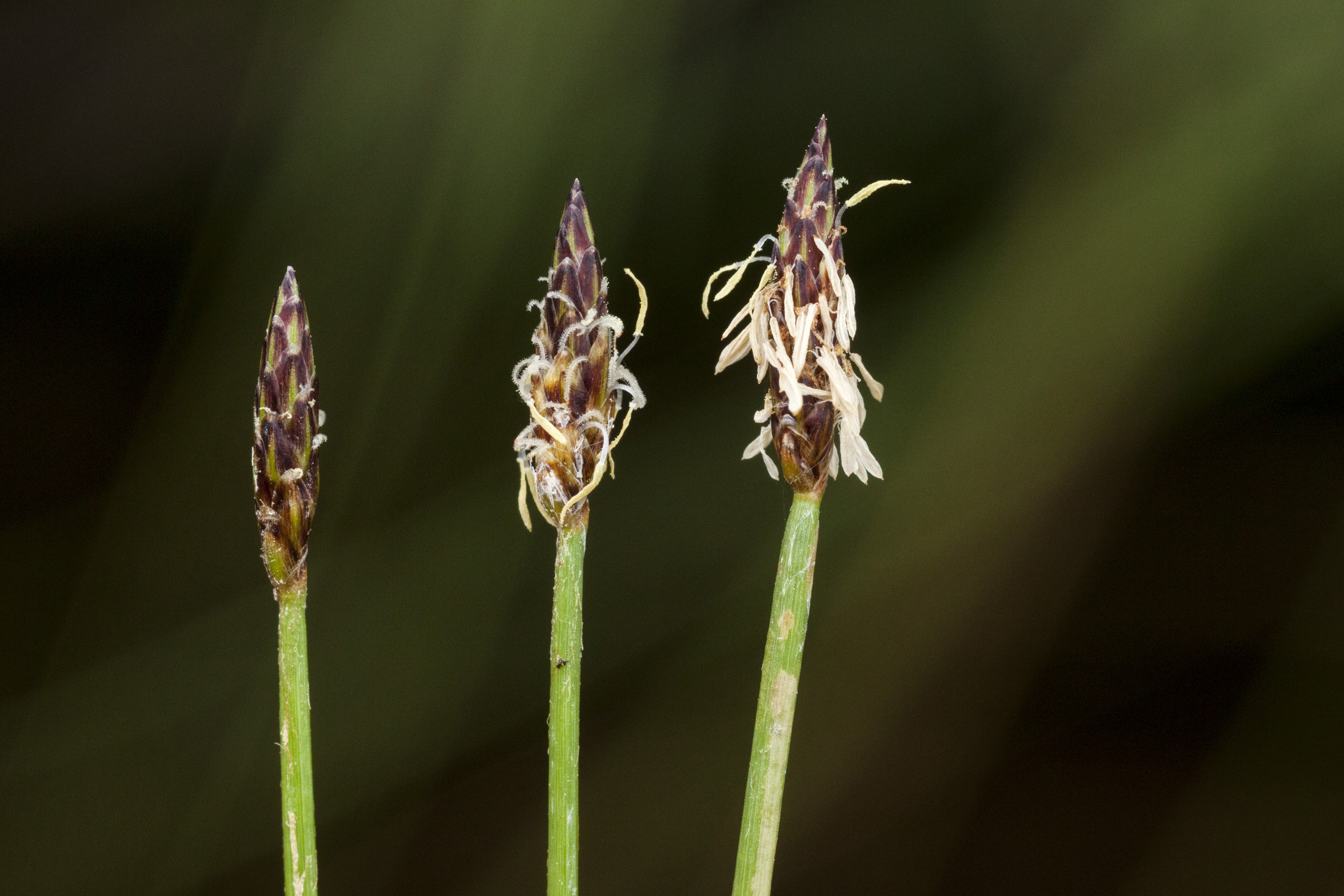

Scientific classification
- Kingdom: Plantae
- Clade: Tracheophytes
- Clade: Angiosperms
- Clade: Monocots
- Clade: Commelinids
- Order: Poales
- Family: Cyperaceae
- Genus: Eleocharis
- Species: E. parishii

Binomial name
- Eleocharis parishii Britton

Synonyms
- Eleocharis montevidensis var. parishii (Britton) V.E.Grant; Eleocharis disciformis Parish in A.Davidson & G.L.Moxley; Eleocharis montevidensis var. disciformis (Parish) V.E.Grant

= Eleocharis parishii =

Species of grass-like plant

Eleocharis parishii is a species of spikesedge known by the common name Parish's spikerush.

It is native to Northern Mexico, the Southwestern United States (from southwestern Oregon and California east to Kansas and western Texas). It grows in moist and sandy habitats with fresh to brackish water.

== Description ==
Eleocharis parishii is a rhizomatous perennial herb forming mats of ridged stems up to 0.5 metres (1.6 ft) tall. The narrow leaves are dark purplish to brown at the bases and becoming lighter in color toward the tips.

The inflorescence is a lance-shaped spikelet appearing at the tip of the stem and measuring up to 1.5 centimeters long. It contains many flowers covered in dark brown bracts.
