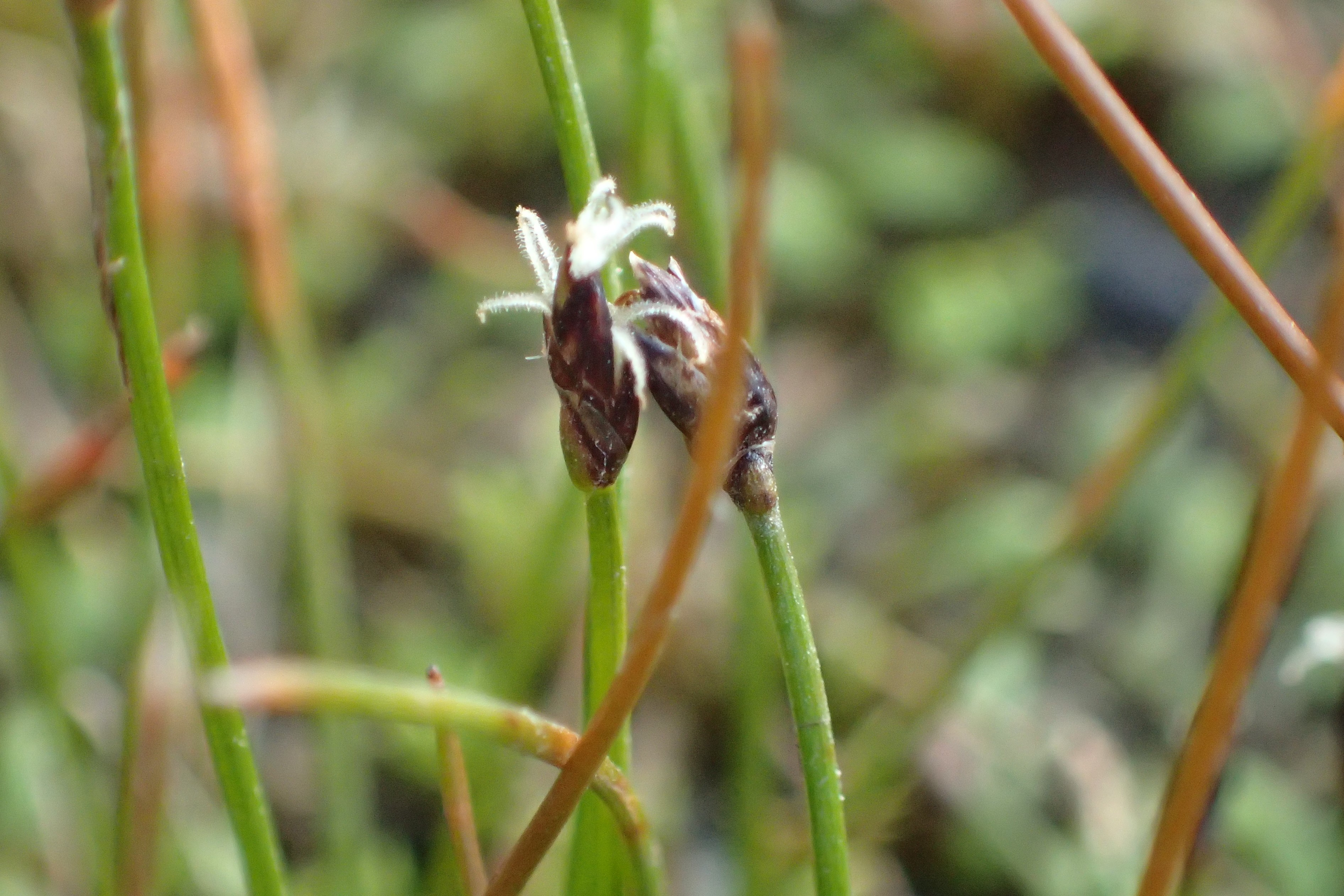

Scientific classification
- Kingdom: Plantae
- Clade: Tracheophytes
- Clade: Angiosperms
- Clade: Monocots
- Clade: Commelinids
- Order: Poales
- Family: Cyperaceae
- Genus: Eleocharis
- Species: E. gracilis

Binomial name
- Eleocharis gracilis R.Br.

= Eleocharis gracilis =

slender spike rush

Species of plant

Eleocharis gracilis the slender spike rush is a slender rush type plant growing from 20 to 50 cm (7.9 to 19.7 in) tall, rarely up to one metre (3 ft 3 in) tall. Found in small clumps, growing in seasonally moist situations in many parts of south eastern Australia and New Zealand. The specific epithet gracilis is from Latin, and refers to a slender appearance. This is one of the many plants first published by Robert Brown with the type known as "(J.) v.v." (meaning "I have seen it living at Port Jackson") appearing in his Prodromus Florae Novae Hollandiae et Insulae Van Diemen in 1810.
