= Eleocharis vivipara =

Scientific classification
- Kingdom: Plantae
- Clade: Tracheophytes
- Clade: Angiosperms
- Clade: Monocots
- Clade: Commelinids
- Order: Poales
- Family: Cyperaceae
- Genus: Eleocharis
- Species: E. vivipara

Binomial name
- Eleocharis vivipara Link

Synonyms
- Scirpus viviparus (Link) Kuntze; Chlorocharis vivipara (Link) Rikli; Trichophyllum viviparum (Link) House; Eleocharis curtisii Small

Species of grass-like plant

Eleocharis vivipara is a species of flowering plant in the sedge family known by several common names, including umbrella hairgrass, sprouting spikerush, and viviparous spikerush. It is native to the southern United States from eastern Texas to eastern Virginia. It takes the form of a clump of thin stems. A spike of flowers appears at the tip of the stem. The plant may also reproduce by growing a plantlet and runners.

Eleocharis vivipara may grow in the water or on land. When it is aquatic it uses C3 carbon fixation pathways for photosynthesis. When it grows out of the water it switches to the C4 mechanism.

This species grows along the margins of water bodies, such as ponds, marshes, and ditches.

== Cultivation ==
It can also be cultivated and used as an aquarium plant.
