= Eleocharis caespitosissima =

Scientific classification
- Kingdom: Plantae
- Clade: Tracheophytes
- Clade: Angiosperms
- Clade: Monocots
- Clade: Commelinids
- Order: Poales
- Family: Cyperaceae
- Genus: Eleocharis
- Species: E. caespitosissima

Binomial name
- Eleocharis caespitosissima Baker

Species of plant

Eleocharis caespitosissima is a sedge of the family Cyperaceae that is native to Australia.

The annual herb to grass-like sedge typically grows to a height of 0.02 to 0.15 metres (0.066 to 0.492 ft) and a width of about 0.15 m (0.49 ft)and has a tufted habit. It blooms between May and August.

It is found submerged in and around rivers and swampy areas in the Kimberley region of Western Australia where it grows in sandy to clay soils.
