= Eleocharis confervoides =

Scientific classification
- Kingdom: Plantae
- Clade: Tracheophytes
- Clade: Angiosperms
- Clade: Monocots
- Clade: Commelinids
- Order: Poales
- Family: Cyperaceae
- Genus: Eleocharis
- Species: E. confervoides

Binomial name
- Eleocharis confervoides (Poid.) Steud.

Species of plant

Eleocharis confervoides is a species of plant in the sedge family (Cyperaceae). It is a perennial, submerged, aquatic and deeply rooted herb. It is known by its common name Algal bulrush and has lots of synonyms. The species has worldwide but very spotty distribution and is native in many tropical and subtropical regions in America, Asia and Africa. It inhabits in water, usually in shallow or deep lakes and ponds. The plant has slender stem with many branches, the leaves float in the water and flowers are usually emergent over the water surface. Fruiting occurs in fall. The most occurrences of plant appear in April and frequency of occurrences is increasing the last years

== Description ==
The plant grows underwater with its upper parts floating near the surface. The culm is long and thin, but strong, with nodes each with culms arranged in a circle around it (whorled). New whorls of branches arise from culms at the edge of the branches, estimating 4-19 culms per whorl. Culms have cylindric (with indentations or not) or 3-angled shape and are hair-like, becoming slimmer in the more distal whorls.

Nodes in upper parts of the stem develop branches. The internodes between the whorls become more and more short distally, while the internodes of the culms of the last whorl are longer at the edge. In the same whorl, it is possible to be found culms with different development because they do not develop at the same time from the node. The branching repeated until nodes of the 4th order but the final subtending sterile culms or less often a stalked spikelet.

Nodes subtend by greyish, pink or dark purple reduced leaves which are small and thin (bracts). There are two bracts; the lower bract subtends the oldest culms of the whorl, while the upper bract is far from the former on the culm whose tip bears the whorl. They are triangular or elliptical.

Leaves are developed within the whorl, between the culm bases. They are usually long, triangular, with two convergent veins and slim. There is not correspondence between the number of leaves and the culms because leaves float in the water and it is ease to decay. Two tubular parts of the leaf (sheaths) are enveloped on base of each culm. The lower sheath is very thin, light-colored or sometimes reddish-brown colored, while the other sheath is longer tubular, very thin and light-colored or greenish with reddish brown lines. Spikelet is a structure of two sterile bracts with small axis and a few florets. The peduncle has spikelets which are develop among the culms that form whorls. They have 2.3-5.1 cm length and 0.35-0.9 cm width. They have two leaf sheaths with easily decomposition. Peduncle is covered by the upper sheath and its apex covers the base of the spikelet.

Spikelets are created at the tips of each peduncle. Their length is 8–12 mm and their width is 1.5–2 mm, with long, elliptic or long-ovate shape. Each spikelet has a pair of bracts at its base (glumes). They are green or greyish with a reddish-brown central line and the median portion is thicker. They have lanceolate shape (narrowly ovate and tapering to a point at the apex), 8–12 mm long, the lower is shorter and has 3-veined, while the upper has 1-veined.

The flower has lateral stamens which are 4 mm long or longer than broad anthers and a pistil with an egg-shaped or 3-angled ovary and a long style with two long, hairy stigmatic branches.

Fruits are nutlets (often called an achene in literature on Cyperaceae). Nutlets are hardened, minute, one-seeded fruit. The nutlets of this species are grey or pale brownish, egg-shaped with the broadest parts towards the apex, 2–2.5 mm long and 1.5–2 mm wide with darker tapering beak 2–3 mm long.

== Etymology ==
The name Eleocharis is New Latin and is derived from Greek words ἑλεο- heleo- meaning "marsh" and χάρις -charis meaning "grace". The specific epithet confervoides is New Latin and is derived from word conferva which means seething, denoting "crowded-looking".

== Habitat and ecology ==
The species, as the most species of Eleocharis, needs warm and wet climate to grow. It usually occurs in areas near the lakes or seasonally flooded areas. Specifically, it is a submerged aquatic grass growing in lakes. It has its roots in mud of the lake bottoms and is wholly submerged in 0.9-1.5 m of water. It can grow in any type of water; clear lakes, standing or running waters, swampy ponds. It prospers in very soft loose organic substrate into the water, and even in sandhill upland lake. It can also be found in open savanna, rarely in easterly savanna.

== Distribution ==
The species has global distribution, especially to tropical and subtropical America, also southern parts of North America, tropical and subtropical Africa, and Asia. It is originated from Alabama, Argentina Northeast, Bolivia, Botswana, Brazil North, Brazil South, Colombia, Costa Rica, Cuba, Florida, Gabon, Georgia, Honduras, Ivory Coast, India, Madagascar, French Guiana, Malaysia, Nicaragua, Guatemala, Nigeria, Guyana, Paraguay, Sri Lanka, Tanzania, Trinidad-Tobago, Venezuela, Zambia, Zaire and is very widespread there. It is found in Ivory Coast, S. Nigeria, Congo-Kinshasa, Zambia, Madagascar, Sri Lanka, Malaysia, Cuba, Trinidad, Guiana, Paraguay, Venezuela, Guatemala, Florida, and S. Carolina. It is doubtful its presence in Ecuador and Suriname.

== Taxonomy and systematics ==
Eleocharis is a genus extending throughout the world and includes 295 accepted species. Taxonomy of the genus is a difficult issue due to morphological convergence in habit and very few morphological traits are phylogenetically useful.

Eleocharis belongs to Cyperoideae subfamily, in tribe Eleocharideae. The genera Bulbostylis and Fimbristylis which are close relatives of Eleocharis, are placed in tribe Abildgaardieae. Hinchliff suggested that the tribes Eleocharideae and Abildgaardieae have sister relationship.

Although it was considered that Egleria and Websteria are derived from within Eleocharis, forming the Eleocharideae group, nowadays Websteria and Egleria are synonyms to Eleocharis. Chillania was also suggested to be nested within Eleocharis based only on morphological analyses, but today Chillania is also a synonym to Eleocharis.

== Additional information ==
Even though some species of Eleocharis are significant for local economies, like Eleocharis dulcis which is cultivated for its edible corms, Eleocharis confervoides has not any agronomic properties or any other uses.

Conservation status has not been evaluated.
