= Eleocharis brassii =

Scientific classification
- Kingdom: Plantae
- Clade: Tracheophytes
- Clade: Angiosperms
- Clade: Monocots
- Clade: Commelinids
- Order: Poales
- Family: Cyperaceae
- Genus: Eleocharis
- Species: E. brassii

Binomial name
- Eleocharis brassii S.T.Blake

Species of grass-like plant

Eleocharis brassii is a sedge of the family Cyperaceae that is native to Australia.

The stoloniferous perennial herb to grass-like sedge typically grows to a height of 0.4 to 0.8 metres (1.3 to 2.6 ft) and has a tufted habit. It blooms between April and June, producing white flowers.

It is found in and around pools and swampy areas in the Kimberley region of Western Australia and the top end of the Northern Territory, where it grows in sandy soils.
