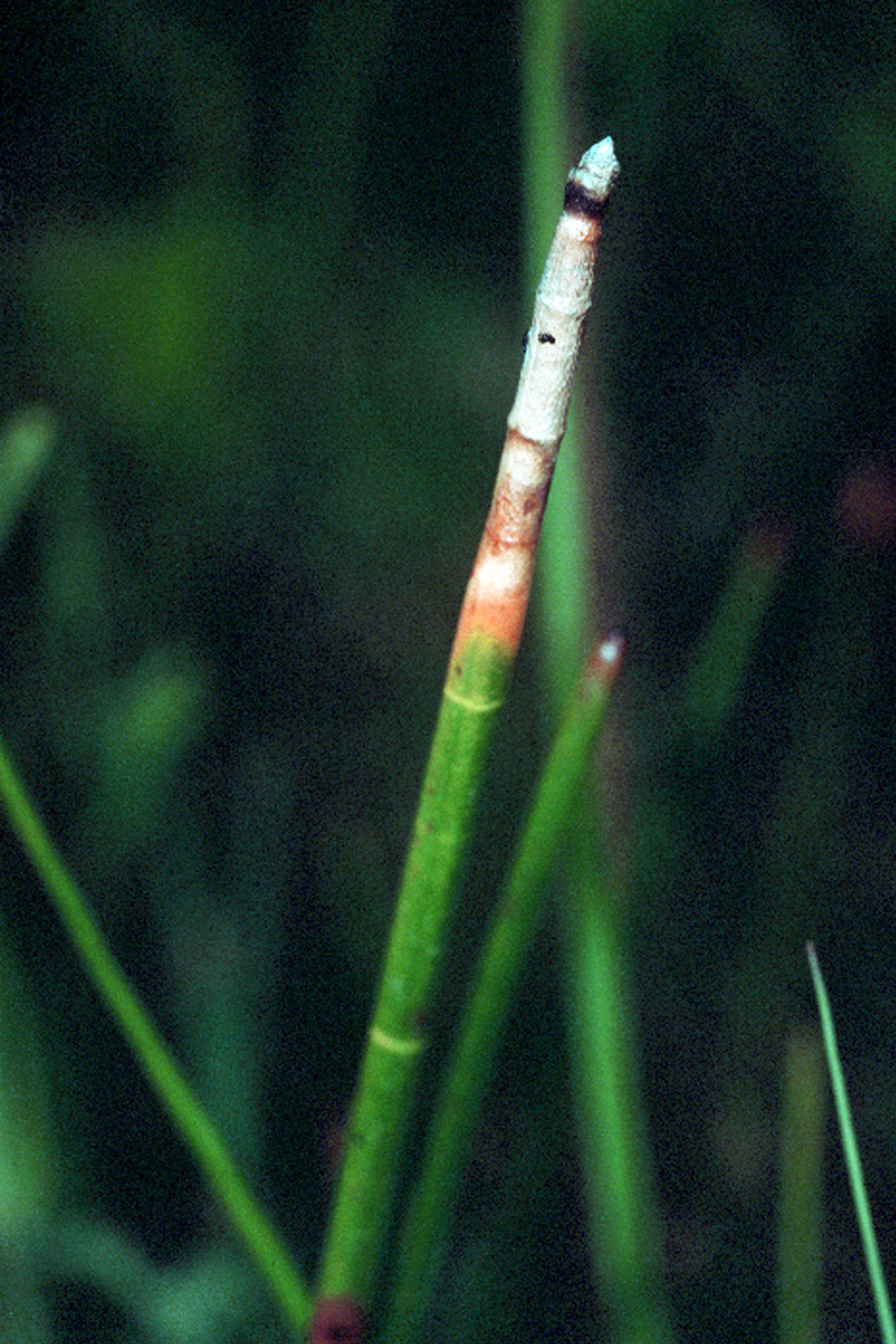

Scientific classification
- Kingdom: Plantae
- Clade: Tracheophytes
- Clade: Angiosperms
- Clade: Monocots
- Clade: Commelinids
- Order: Poales
- Family: Cyperaceae
- Genus: Eleocharis
- Species: E. equisetoides

Binomial name
- Eleocharis equisetoides (Elliott) Torr.

Synonyms
- Eleocharis elliottii A.Dietr.; Limnochloa equisetoides (Elliott) Walp.; Scirpus equisetoides Elliott

= Eleocharis equisetoides =

Species of grass-like plant

Eleocharis equisetoides, with common names including horsetail spike-rush, jointed spike-rush, spikesedge, and knotted spike-rush, is a plant species native to the United States and Ontario, usually in freshwater wetland areas. It is known primarily from the Atlantic coastal plain from Texas to Massachusetts, and the Great Lakes region, with scattered populations elsewhere.

Eleocharis equisetoides and the related E. interstincta have hollow stems with complete transverse septa. This gives them a jointed appearance superficially resembling the stems of some species of Equisetum. The two species can be distinguished by the length of the perianth bristles subtending the achenes.
