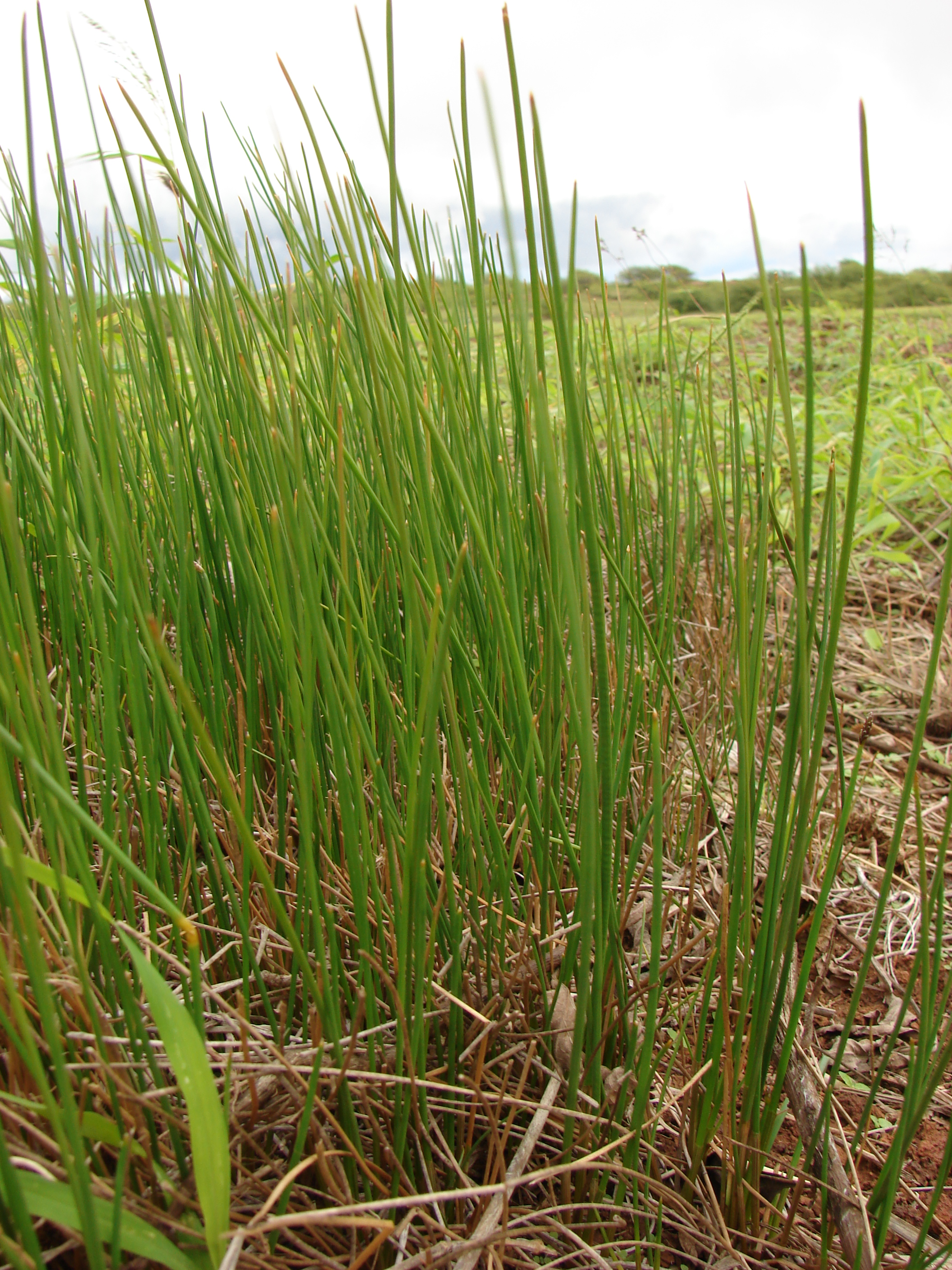
- Eleocharis calva

Scientific classification
- Kingdom: Plantae
- Clade: Tracheophytes
- Clade: Angiosperms
- Clade: Monocots
- Clade: Commelinids
- Order: Poales
- Family: Cyperaceae
- Genus: Eleocharis; R.Br.

Synonyms
- Heleocharis T.Lestib; Limnochloa P.Beauv. ex Lestib; Megadenus Raf.; Clavula Dumort.; Heliocharis Lindl.; Baeothryon Ehrh. ex A.Dietr.; Chaetocyperus Nees; Eleogenus Nees; Scirpidium Nees; Elaeocharis Brongn.; Websteria S.H.Wright; Chlorocharis Rikli; Chillania Roiv.; Chamaegyne Suess.; Helonema Suess.; Egleria L.T.Eiten

= Eleocharis =

Genus of grass-like plants

Eleocharis is a virtually cosmopolitan genus of 250 or more species of flowering plants in the sedge family, Cyperaceae. The name is derived from the Greek words ἕλειος (heleios), meaning "marsh dweller," and χάρις (charis), meaning "grace." Members of the genus are known commonly as spikerushes or spikesedges. The genus has a geographically cosmopolitan distribution, with centers of diversity in the Amazon rainforest and adjacent eastern slopes of the South American Andes, northern Australia, eastern North America, California, Southern Africa, and subtropical Asia. The vast majority of Eleocharis species grow in aquatic or mesic habitats from sea level to higher than 5,000 meters in elevation (in the tropical Andes).

The genus itself is relatively easy to recognize; all Eleocharis species have photosynthetic stems but no green leaves (the leaves have been reduced to sheaths surrounding the base of the stems). Many species are robust, rhizomatously-spreading plants of lowland tropical wetlands, while many others are small caespitose annual or perennial herbs growing near streams, and still others are intermediate. There are also a number of species that are obligate aquatic species, which usually have submerged, branching stems and often exhibit interesting photosynthetic adaptations, such as the ability to switch between C_{3} and C_{4} carbon fixation in response to different environmental stimuli. In all Eleocharis species, the flowers are borne on unbranched terminal spikelets at the apices of stems.

In spite of the diversity of the genus itself, taxonomic characters useful for delimiting species within it are few, and many species are very difficult to tell apart. Many currently recognized species with very wide geographic ranges are highly polymorphic. Some of these species probably contain multiple independently evolving lineages. Because of their difficult nature, it is suggested that many botanists avoid collecting these plants and so many species are under-represented in the botanical record.

One of the best known species is the Chinese water chestnut, Eleocharis dulcis. These plants bear tubers on their rhizomes which may be peeled and eaten raw or boiled. In Australia, magpie geese rely almost exclusively on these tubers for sustenance for a significant portion of the year.

== Selected species ==
- Eleocharis acicularis (L.) Roem. & Schult. – needle spikerush; dwarf hairgrass
- Eleocharis acuta R.Br.
- Eleocharis acutangula (Roxb.) Schult.
- Eleocharis afflata Steud.
- Eleocharis atropurpurea (Retz.) J.Presl & C.Presl – purple spikerush
- Eleocharis baldwinii (Torr.) Chapm.
- Eleocharis bella (Piper) Svenson – beautiful spikerush
- Eleocharis bifida S.G. Smith glade spikerush
- Eleocharis bolanderi A.Gray – Bolander's spikerush
- Eleocharis brassii S.T.Blake
- Eleocharis brittonii Svenson ex Small
- Eleocharis caespitosissima Baker
- Eleocharis carniolica W.D.J.Koch
- Eleocharis cellulosa Torr. – coastal spikerush, Gulf Coast spikerush
- Eleocharis compressa Sull. – flatstem spikerush
- Eleocharis confervoides (Poir.) Steud.
- Eleocharis congesta D.Don
- Eleocharis cylindrostachys Boeckler
- Eleocharis dietrichiana Boeckler
- Eleocharis dulcis (Burm.f.) Trin. ex Hensch. – Chinese water chestnut
- Eleocharis elegans (Kunth) Roem. & Schult.
- Eleocharis equisetoides (Elliott) Torr.
- Eleocharis erythropoda Steud. – Red-stemmed spikerush
- Eleocharis filiculmis Kunth
- Eleocharis geniculata (L.) Roem. & Schult. – Canada spikesedge
- Eleocharis gracilis R.Br.
- Eleocharis halophila Fernald & Brackett – saltmarsh spikerush
- Eleocharis jacobsiana K.L.Wilson
- Eleocharis keigheryi K.L.Wilson
- Eleocharis kuroguwai Ohwi
- Eleocharis macrostachya Britton – pale spikerush
- Eleocharis montana (Kunth) Roem. & Schult.
- Eleocharis montevidensis Kunth – sand spikerush
- Eleocharis mutata (L.) Roem. & Schult. – scallion grass
- Eleocharis nitida Fernald – neat spikerush
- Eleocharis nodulosa Schult.
- Eleocharis obtusa (Willd.) Schult. – blunt spikerush
- Eleocharis ochrostachys Steud.
- Eleocharis pachycarpa Desv. – black sand spikerush
- Eleocharis pachystyla (C.Wright) C.B.Clarke – false junco
- Eleocharis pallens S.T.Blake – pale spikerush
- Eleocharis palustris (L.) Roem. & Schult. – common spikerush
- Eleocharis papillosa Latz
- Eleocharis parishii Britton – Parish's spikerush
- Eleocharis parvula (Roem. & Schult.) Link ex Bluff et al. – dwarf spikerush, hairgrass
- Eleocharis pellucida J.Presl & C.Presl
- Eleocharis philippinensis Svenson
- Eleocharis plana S.T.Blake
- Eleocharis pusilla R.Br.
- Eleocharis quadrangulata (Michx.) Roem. – squarestem spikerush
- Eleocharis quinqueflora (Hartmann) O.Schwarz – fewflower spikerush
- Eleocharis radicans (A.Dietr.) Kunth – rooted spikerush
- Eleocharis rivalis K.L.Wilson
- Eleocharis rostellata (Torr.) Torr. – beaked spikerush
- Eleocharis sanguinolenta K.L.Wilson
- Eleocharis sellowiana Kunth
- Eleocharis sphacelata R.Br. – tall spikerush
- Eleocharis spiralis (Rottb.) Schult.
- Eleocharis sundaica J.Kern
- Eleocharis tenuis (Willd.) Schult. – slender spikerush
- Eleocharis torticulmis S.G.Sm. – twist-stem spikerush
- Eleocharis tortilis (Link) Schult. – twisted spikerush
- Eleocharis triquetra K.L.Wilson
- Eleocharis tuberculosa (Michx.) Roem. & Schult.
- Eleocharis uniglumis (Link) (Link) Schult., 1824
- Eleocharis vivipara Link – umbrella hairgrass
- Eleocharis wadoodii S.R.Yadav, Lekhak & Chandore
- Eleocharis welwitschii Nelmes
- Eleocharis wichurae Boeckeler
- Eleocharis wilkensii Schuyler
- Eleocharis wolfii (A.Gray) A.Gray ex Britton
