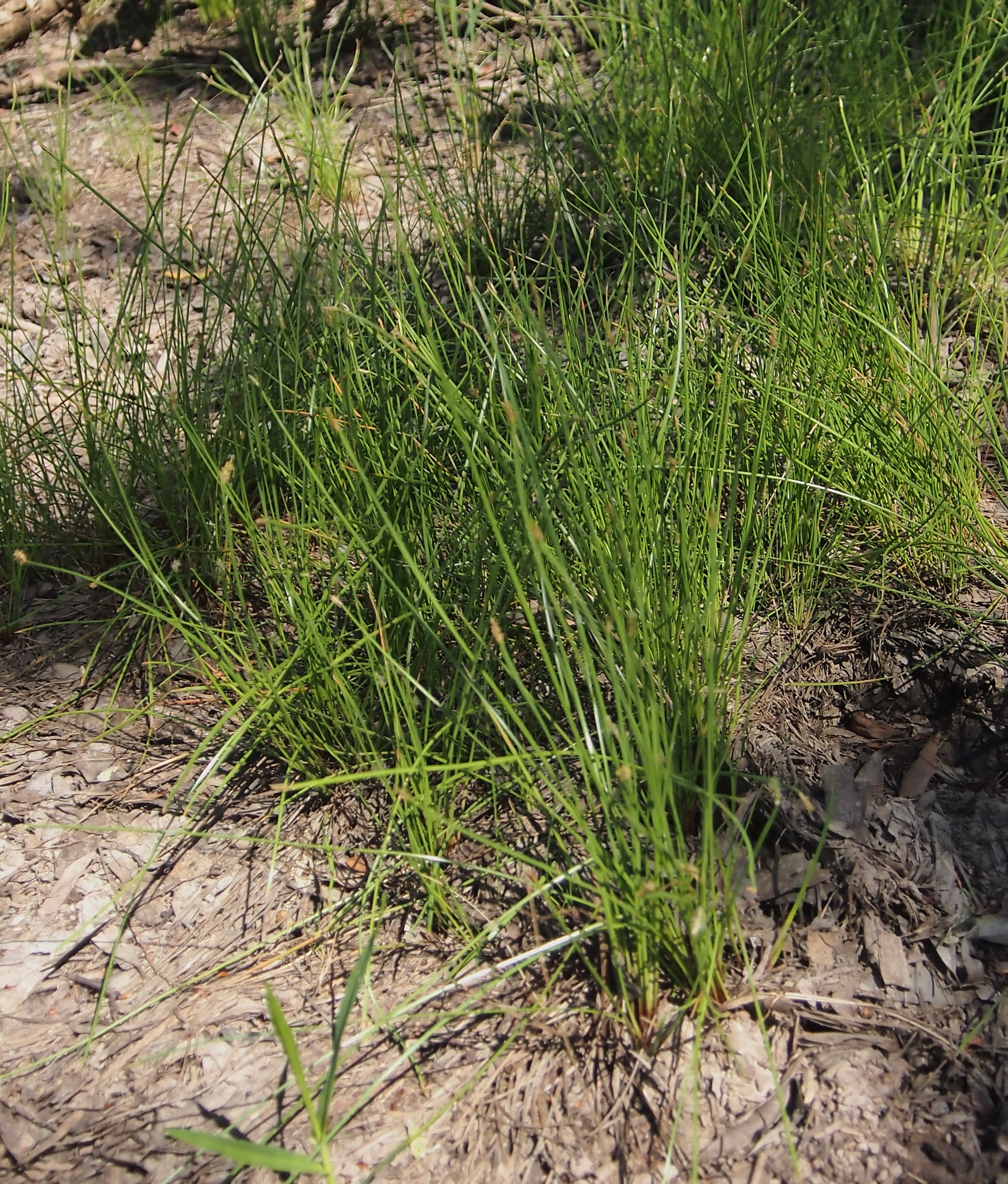

Conservation status
- Priority Three — Poorly Known Taxa (DEC)

Scientific classification
- Kingdom: Plantae
- Clade: Tracheophytes
- Clade: Angiosperms
- Clade: Monocots
- Clade: Commelinids
- Order: Poales
- Family: Cyperaceae
- Genus: Eleocharis
- Species: E. ochrostachys

Binomial name
- Eleocharis ochrostachys Steud.

= Eleocharis ochrostachys =

Species of grass-like plant

Eleocharis ochrostachys, commonly known as spike rush, is a sedge of the family Cyperaceae that is native to Australia and Asia.

== Description ==
The rhizomatous perennial herb to grass-like sedge typically grows to a height of 0.35 to 0.6 metres (1.1 to 2.0 ft) and produces green flowers. The sedge has short rhizomes and long stolons. The smooth, erect, rigid and terete stems are 35 to 60 centimetres (14 to 24 in) in height and have a diameter of 2 to 5 millimetres (0.079 to 0.197 in). The leaves have membranous sheaths and are a purplish colour at the base. The flowers are on pale green cylindrical spikelets that are wider than the stem. The spikelets are 10 to 20 mm (0.394 to 0.787 in) long and 3 to 4 mm (0.118 to 0.157 in) with firm glumes. After flowering, biconvex light brown to grey coloured nuts form that are ribbed on the margins with an obovate to broadly obovate shape that are 1.5 to 2 mm (0.059 to 0.079 in) in length.

== Taxonomy ==
The species was first formally described by the botanist Ernst Gottlieb von Steudel in 1854 as part of the work Synopsis Plantarum Glumacearum. Several synonyms are known including; Eleocharis variegata var. laxiflora, Scirpus laxiflorus and Eleocharis difformis.

== Distribution ==
It is found in and around swampy areas throughout its extensive range. The range of the plant includes coastal areas in Australia, India, China, Japan, Micronesia and Melanesia. In Australia the plant is often in closed forest or in Melaleuca dominated swamps in wet areas such as swamps, creek-lines or damp depressions. The sedge has a scattered distribution in northern Australia through parts of the Kimberley region of Western Australia, the top end of the Northern Territory, parts of northern Queensland and coastal parts of New South Wales.
