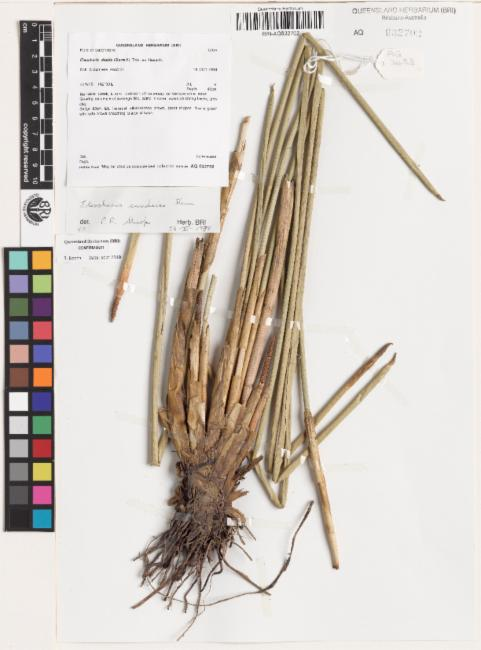

Scientific classification
- Kingdom: Plantae
- Clade: Tracheophytes
- Clade: Angiosperms
- Clade: Monocots
- Clade: Commelinids
- Order: Poales
- Family: Cyperaceae
- Genus: Eleocharis
- Species: E. sundaica

Binomial name
- Eleocharis sundaica J.Kern

= Eleocharis sundaica =

Species of grass-like plant

Eleocharis sundaica is a sedge of the family Cyperaceae that is native to Australia.

The rhizomatous perennial herb to grass-like sedge typically grows to a height of 0.6 to 1 metre (2.0 to 3.3 ft) and is sometime found partly submerged. It blooms between May and August producing white flowers.

It is found in and around swamps and pools of water in the Kimberley region of Western Australia where it grows in sandy soils.
