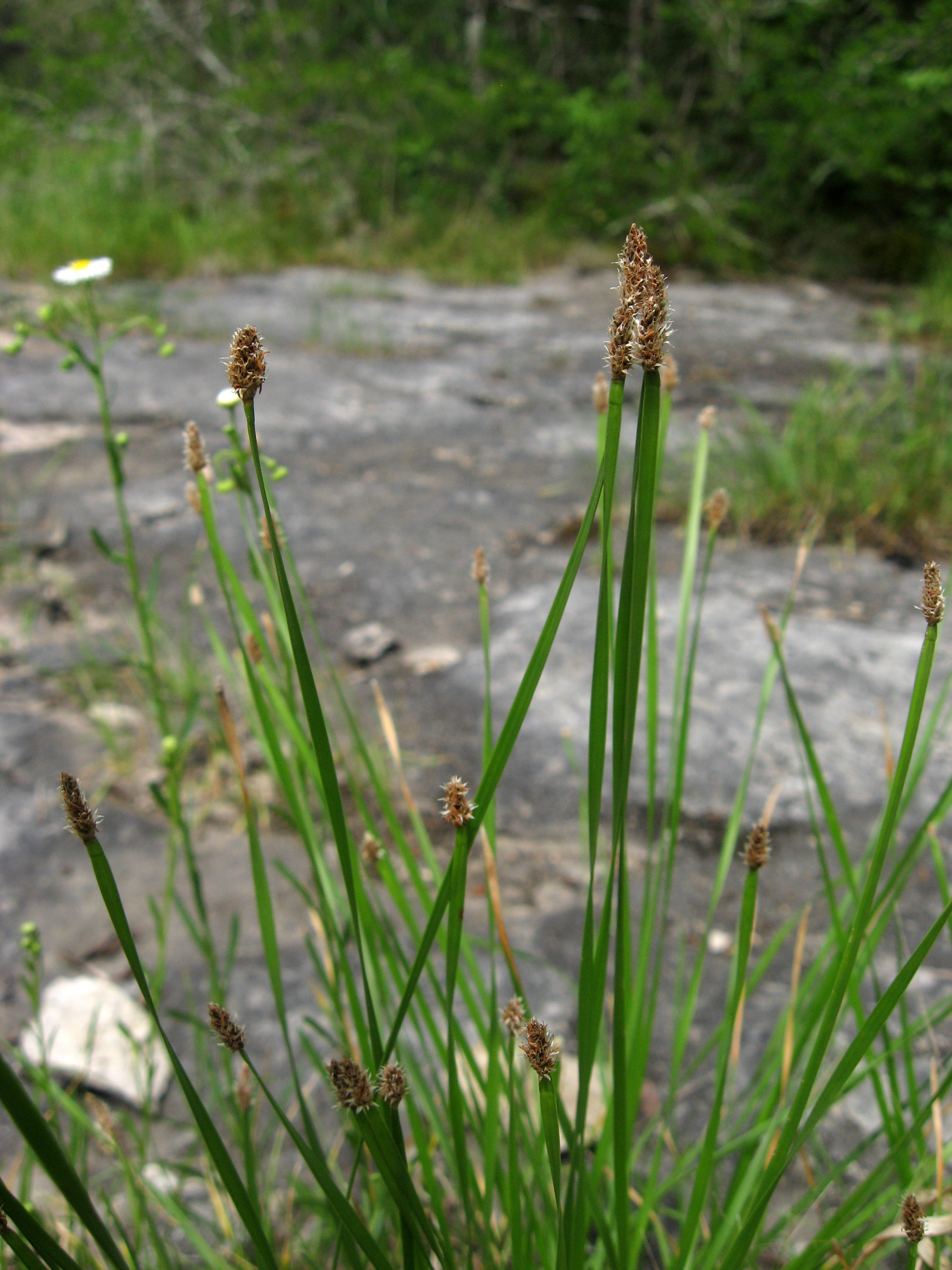

Conservation status
- Vulnerable (NatureServe)

Scientific classification
- Kingdom: Plantae
- Clade: Tracheophytes
- Clade: Angiosperms
- Clade: Monocots
- Clade: Commelinids
- Order: Poales
- Family: Cyperaceae
- Genus: Eleocharis
- Species: E. bifida

Binomial name
- Eleocharis bifida S.G. Smith

= Eleocharis bifida =

Glade spikerush

Species of grass-like plant

Eleocharis bifida is a species of spikesedge known by the common name glade spikerush. It is native to the Eastern United States, where it is endemic to the Interior Low Plateau and very small part of the Ridge and Valley ecoregions. This is mostly in Kentucky and Tennessee, extending into southern Indiana, northern Alabama, and northwestern Georgia. It is found only in wet areas in cedar glades, such as pools and streamsides. This narrow habitat requirement is the reason for it being considered vulnerable.

Eleocharis bifida was described to science in 2001, being separated from the similar Eleocharis compressa. Eleocharis bifida can be recognized by having wider stems and all floral scales bifid (2-lobed).
