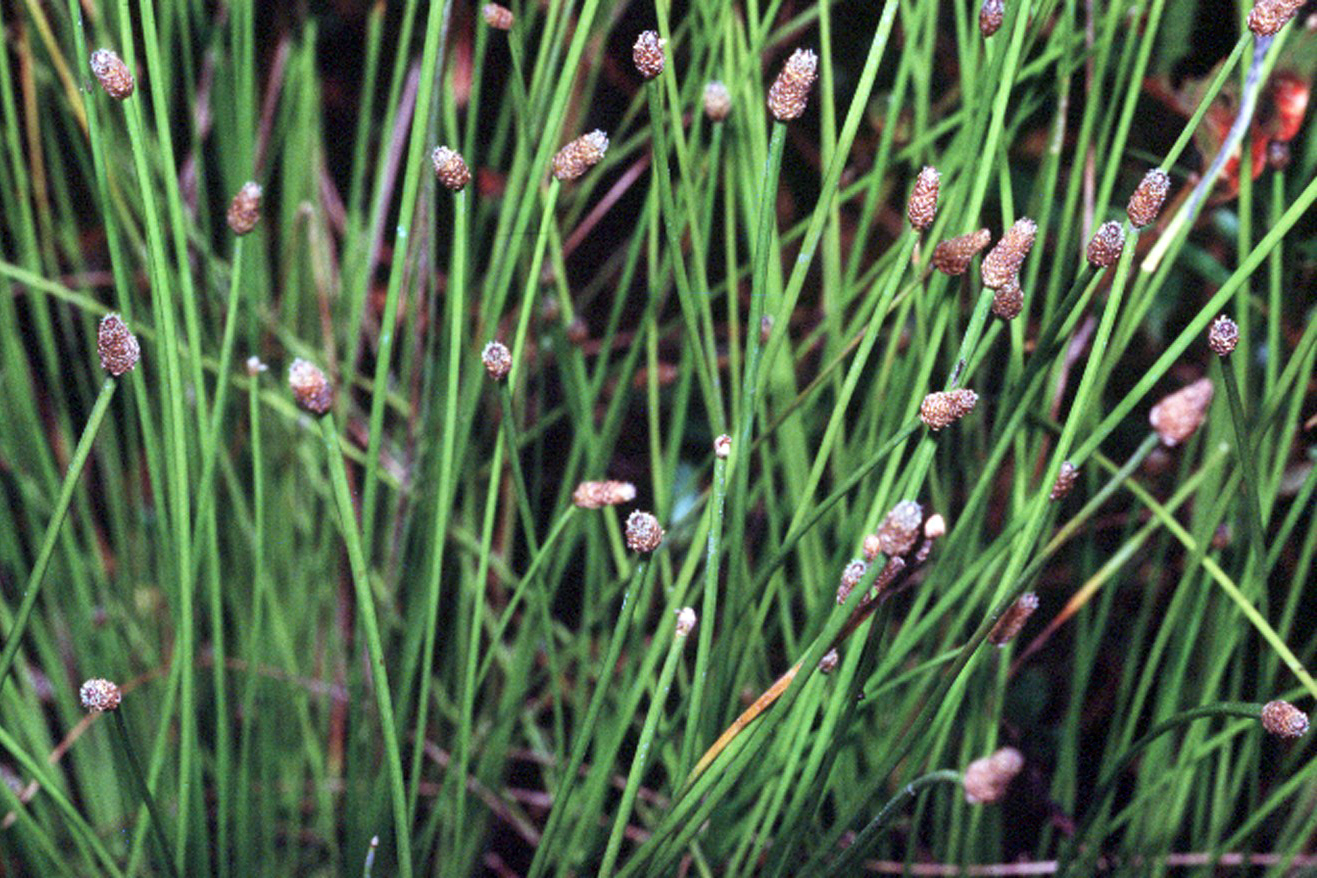

Scientific classification
- Kingdom: Plantae
- Clade: Tracheophytes
- Clade: Angiosperms
- Clade: Monocots
- Clade: Commelinids
- Order: Poales
- Family: Cyperaceae
- Genus: Eleocharis
- Species: E. obtusa

Binomial name
- Eleocharis obtusa (Willd.) Schult.

= Eleocharis obtusa =

Species of grass-like plant

Eleocharis obtusa is a species of spikesedge known by the common name blunt spikerush. This plant is widely distributed across Canada and the United States, where it grows in wet areas such as riverbanks and moist forest floors. It is also a weed of rice paddies, especially when the rice plants are young sprouts. This is an annual spikesedge approaching half a meter in maximum height. It has many green cylindrical stems which are erect but weak and spongy. There may be thin, grasslike leaves toward the base of the plant, which are generally straw-colored. Atop each stem is a rounded or oblong spikelet containing at least ten flowers, each covered by an oval-shaped brown bract.
