= Eleocharis atropurpurea =

Purple spikerush

Scientific classification
- Kingdom: Plantae
- Clade: Tracheophytes
- Clade: Angiosperms
- Clade: Monocots
- Clade: Commelinids
- Order: Poales
- Family: Cyperaceae
- Genus: Eleocharis
- Species: E. atropurpurea

Binomial name
- Eleocharis atropurpurea (Retz.) J. Presl & C. Presl

Synonyms
- Eleocharis multiflora; Scirpus atropurpureus; and many more

Species of grass-like plant

Eleocharis atropurpurea is a species of spikesedge known by the common name purple spikerush. This is an aquatic plant native to much of Africa, eastern and southern Asia, Australia, and Latin America. It also has a wide distribution in temperate regions of North and South America and Asia. It is present in Europe, where it may be an introduced species for the most part.

Eleocharis atropurpurea can be found in wet areas from ocean shores to rice fields and irrigation ditches to inland lakes and rivers. This is an annual sedge rarely exceeding ten centimeters in height. It grows in tufts with few reddish-green leaves and many thin erect stems. Atop each stem is an oval-shaped, pointed inflorescence consisting of a spikelet under a centimeter long and containing at least ten flowers. Each tiny flower is covered by a bract which is a purplish-brown color. The fruit is a minute shiny black achene less than a millimeter long.
