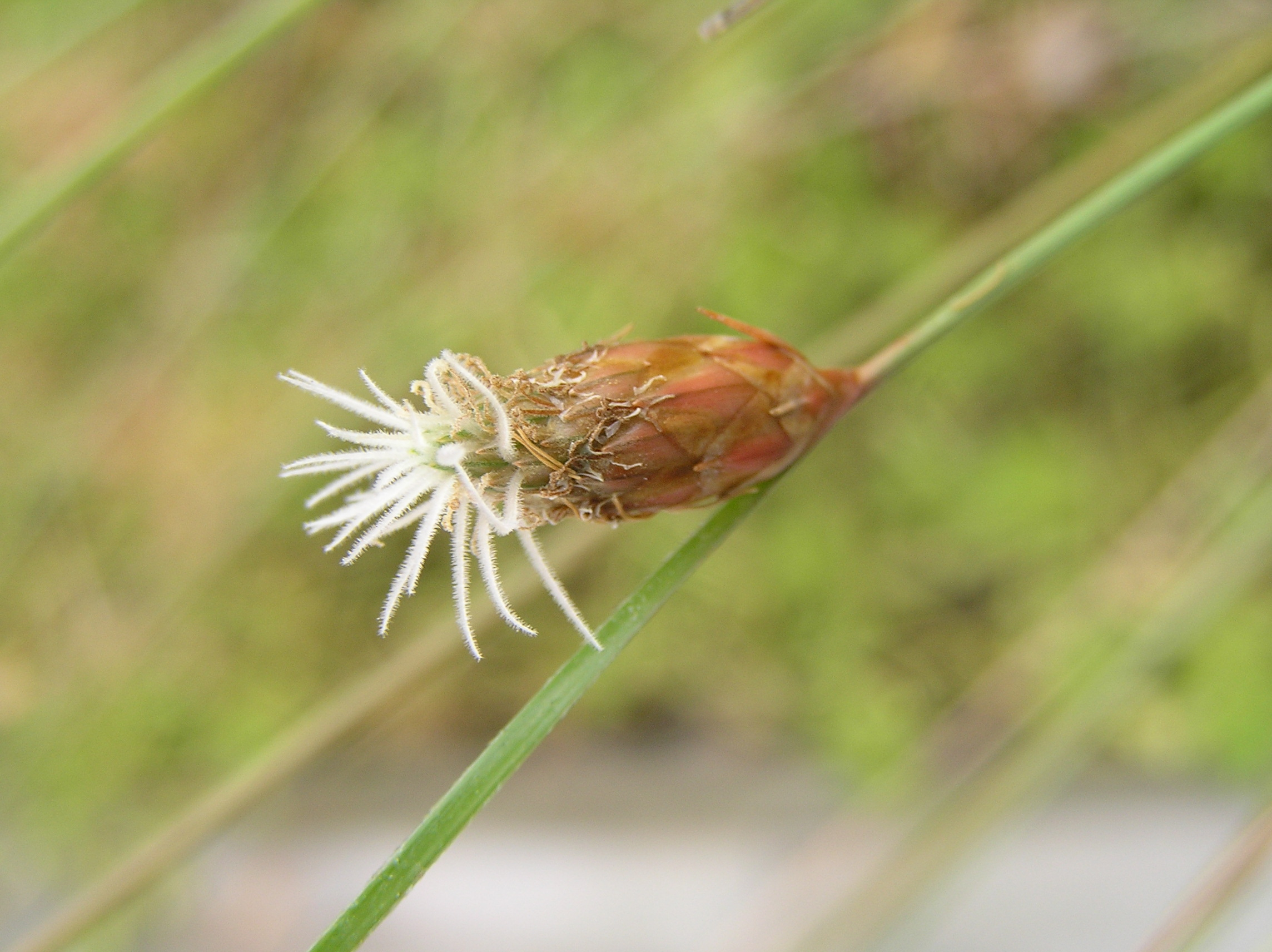
- Eleocharis geniculata, Hong Kong Wetland Park

Scientific classification
- Kingdom: Plantae
- Clade: Tracheophytes
- Clade: Angiosperms
- Clade: Monocots
- Clade: Commelinids
- Order: Poales
- Family: Cyperaceae
- Genus: Eleocharis
- Species: E. geniculata

Binomial name
- Eleocharis geniculata (L.) Roem. & Schult.

Synonyms
- Scirpus caribaea; Scirpus geniculatus; and numerous others

= Eleocharis geniculata =

Species of grass-like plant

Eleocharis geniculata is a species of spikesedge known by several common names, including bent spikerush and Canada spikesedge. This is a widespread plant of wet areas in the Americas, Asia, Africa, Australia, Madagascar, and some Pacific Islands. It is an annual spikesedge growing to a maximum height of about 40 centimeters. It has a few straw-colored leaves and many thin erect stems. The stems hold inflorescences of rounded spikelets each containing at least 10 tiny flowers. The flowers are covered with dark greenish-brown bracts. The fruit is a shiny purple-brown achene not more than a millimeter long.
