= Eleocharis jacobsiana =

Scientific classification
- Kingdom: Plantae
- Clade: Tracheophytes
- Clade: Angiosperms
- Clade: Monocots
- Clade: Commelinids
- Order: Poales
- Family: Cyperaceae
- Genus: Eleocharis
- Species: E. jacobsiana

Binomial name
- Eleocharis jacobsiana K.L.Wilson

Species of grass-like plant

Eleocharis jacobsiana is a sedge of the family Cyperaceae that is native to Western Australia.

The species was first described in 2011 by Karen Wilson, who gave it the species epithet, jacobsiana, to honour Surrey Wilfrid Laurence Jacobs.
