= Eleocharis tuberculosa =

Scientific classification
- Kingdom: Plantae
- Clade: Tracheophytes
- Clade: Angiosperms
- Clade: Monocots
- Clade: Commelinids
- Order: Poales
- Family: Cyperaceae
- Genus: Eleocharis
- Species: E. tuberculosa

Binomial name
- Eleocharis tuberculosa (Hartmann) O. Schwarz

Synonyms
- Bulbostylis tuberculosa (Michx.) Steven; Chlorocharis tuberculosa (Michx.) Rikll; Eleocharis tuberculosa var. pubnicoensis Fernald; Eleocharis tuberculosa f. pubnicoensis (Fernald) Svenson; Eleocharis tuberculosa f. retrorsa Svenson; Megadenus tuberculatus (Elliott) Raf.; Rhynchospora monostachya Steud.; Scirpus tuberculatus Elliott; Scirpus tuberculosus Michx.; Trichophyllum tuberculosum (Michx.) House

Species of grass-like plant

Eleocharis tuberculosa, the cone-cup spikerush or large-tubercled spikerush, is a plant species native to the United States and Canada. It has been reported from every state on the Gulf and Atlantic coasts from Maine to Texas, plus Kentucky, Tennessee, Arkansas and Nova Scotia. It is found in wet soil in meadows, woodlands, lake shores and river banks.

Eleocharis tuberculosa is a perennial herb forming dense clumps. Culms are elliptical in cross-section, up to 70 cm tall. Styles of pistillate flowers have a swollen base called a tubercule, white to pale orange-brown, often with red spots, up to 2.5 mm across.
