= Eleocharis philippinensis =

Conservation status
- Priority Three — Poorly Known Taxa (DEC)

Scientific classification
- Kingdom: Plantae
- Clade: Embryophytes
- Clade: Tracheophytes
- Clade: Spermatophytes
- Clade: Angiosperms
- Clade: Monocots
- Clade: Commelinids
- Order: Poales
- Family: Cyperaceae
- Genus: Eleocharis
- Species: E. philippinensis

Binomial name
- Eleocharis philippinensis Svenson

Species of grass-like plant

Eleocharis philippinensis is a sedge of the family Cyperaceae that is native to Southeast Asia, Melanesia (up to New Caledonia), and parts of northern Australia and southern China.

The rhizomatous, erect and slender perennial herb to grass-like sedge typically grows to a height of 0.3 to 0.5 metres (1.0 to 1.6 ft) and has a tufted habit and produces green flowers. It commonly grows in flooded fields.
