= Eleocharis halophila =

Scientific classification
- Kingdom: Plantae
- Clade: Tracheophytes
- Clade: Angiosperms
- Clade: Monocots
- Clade: Commelinids
- Order: Poales
- Family: Cyperaceae
- Genus: Eleocharis
- Species: E. halophila

Binomial name
- Eleocharis halophila Fernald & Brackett

Species of grass-like plant

Eleocharis halophila, the saltmarsh spikerush, is a perennial halophytic plant endemic to salt marshes in eastern Canada, in Ontario in Hudson Bay and James Bay, Quebec in the St. Lawrence Seaway as far as the city of Quebec, Newfoundland and Nova Scotia and in the United States from Maine to North Carolina. It is one of 76 species of Eleocharis amongst the 36 genera in the sedge family (Cyperaceae).

Eleocharis halophila is listed as an "obligate wetland" (OBL) species, and occurs almost always (estimated probability 99%) under natural conditions in wetlands.

The plant is listed by federal and state authorities as either threatened or endangered in multiple states, where it also known by various common names:

- Maryland:salt-marsh spikerush: Endangered
- New Hampshire: salt-loving spike-rush: Threatened
- New York: salt-marsh spikerush: Threatened
- North Carolina: salt spikerush: Threatened
