= Eleocharis spiralis =

Scientific classification
- Kingdom: Plantae
- Clade: Tracheophytes
- Clade: Angiosperms
- Clade: Monocots
- Clade: Commelinids
- Order: Poales
- Family: Cyperaceae
- Genus: Eleocharis
- Species: E. spiralis

Binomial name
- Eleocharis spiralis (Rottb.) Schult.

Species of grass-like plant

Eleocharis spiralis is a sedge of the family Cyperaceae that is native to Australia.

The rhizomatous perennial herb to grass-like sedge typically grows to a height of 0.4 to 0.6 metres (1.3 to 2.0 ft). It blooms between February and April producing white flowers.

It is found in and around brackish areas such as lagoons and estuaries in coastal parts of the Kimberley region of Western Australia.
