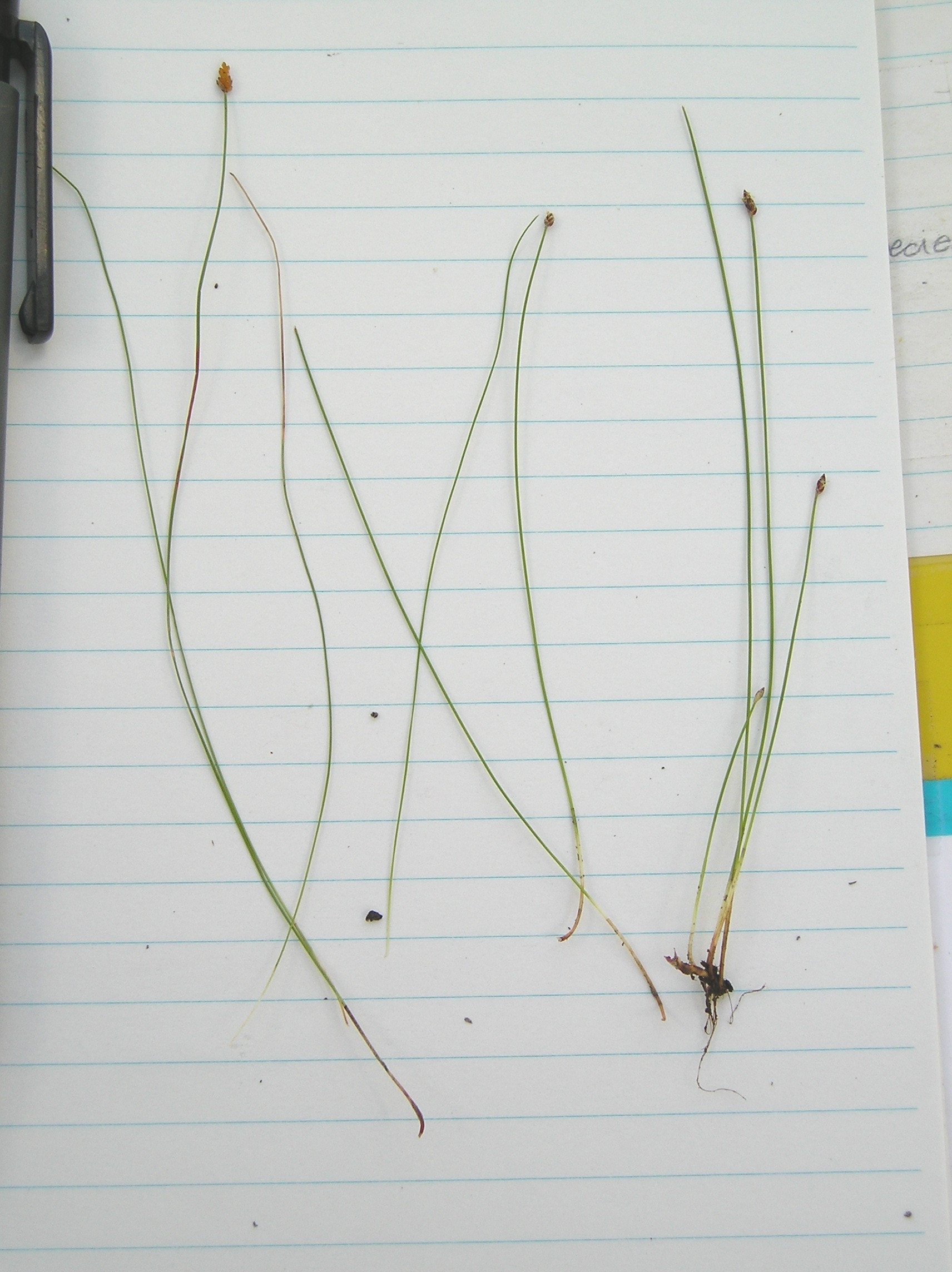

Scientific classification
- Kingdom: Plantae
- Clade: Tracheophytes
- Clade: Angiosperms
- Clade: Monocots
- Clade: Commelinids
- Order: Poales
- Family: Cyperaceae
- Genus: Eleocharis
- Species: E. nitida

Binomial name
- Eleocharis nitida Fernald

Synonyms
- Scirpus nitidus (Fernald) Hultén

= Eleocharis nitida =

Neat spikerush; species of grass-like sedge

Eleocharis nitida is a species of flowering plant commonly called neat spikerush, it is a member of the sedge family Cyperaceae.

== Description ==
Eleocharis nitida is a perennial growing from scaly, purplish rhizomes. The culms grow 1 to 8 inches tall. The inflorescences spikelets are 2.0–4.5 mm (0.8–1.8 in.) long, and each spikelet has from 5 to 30 flowers. It produces a three-angled, bristles achene, that is pale yellow to orangish in color, which matures in mid-June to mid-October.

Its native range includes Newfoundland, Labrador, Nova Scotia, Ontario, Quebec, and Saskatchewan of Canada and the US states of Alaska, Michigan, Minnesota, New Hampshire, and Wisconsin. It is listed as a species of special concern in the US state of Minnesota, where it grows in full sun in moist to wet soils; it is found in areas with disturbed soils, in ditches, along trails, and shallow depressions, and bog pools.

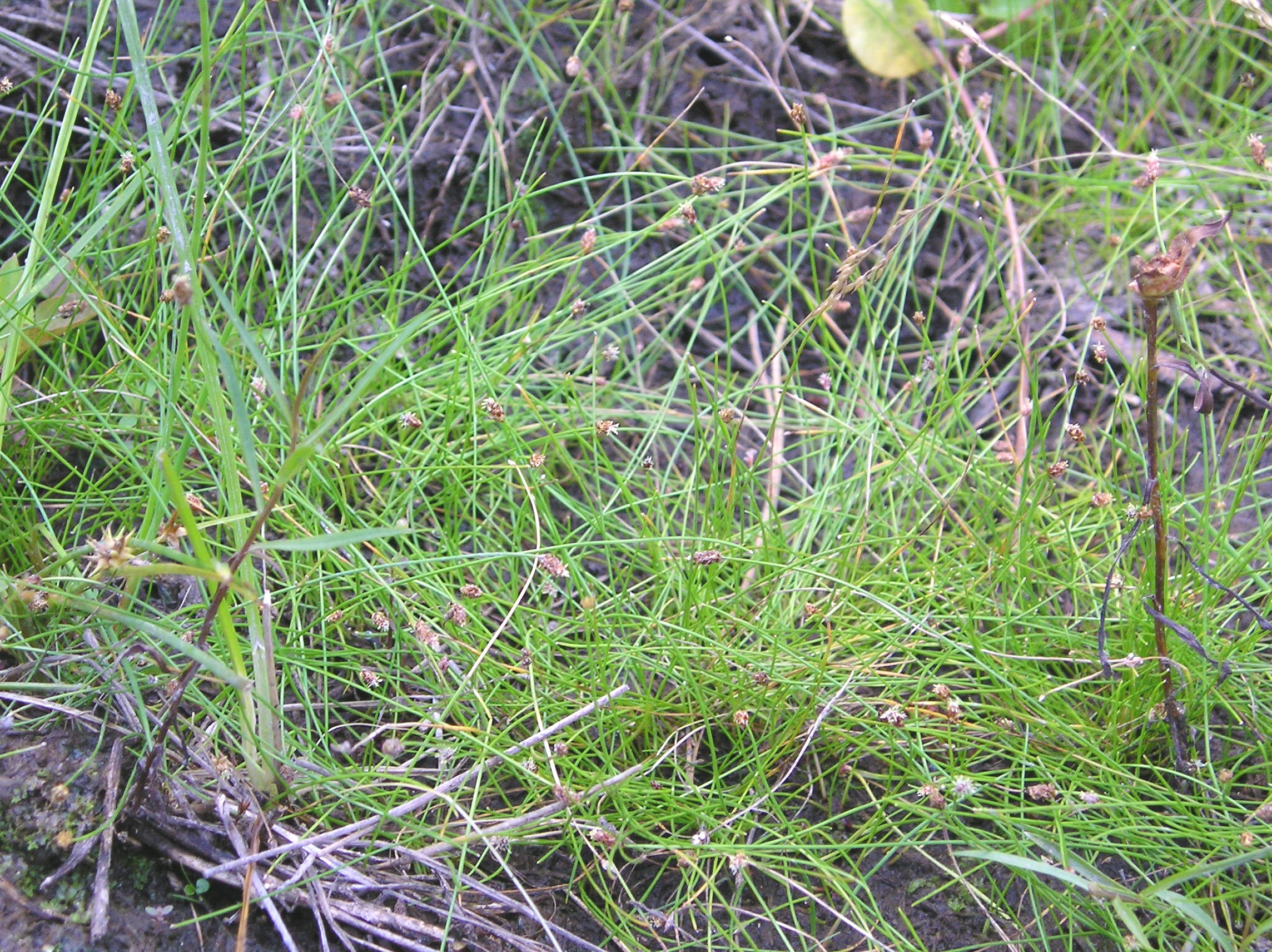
Eleocharis nitida 5-eheep (5097863528)
