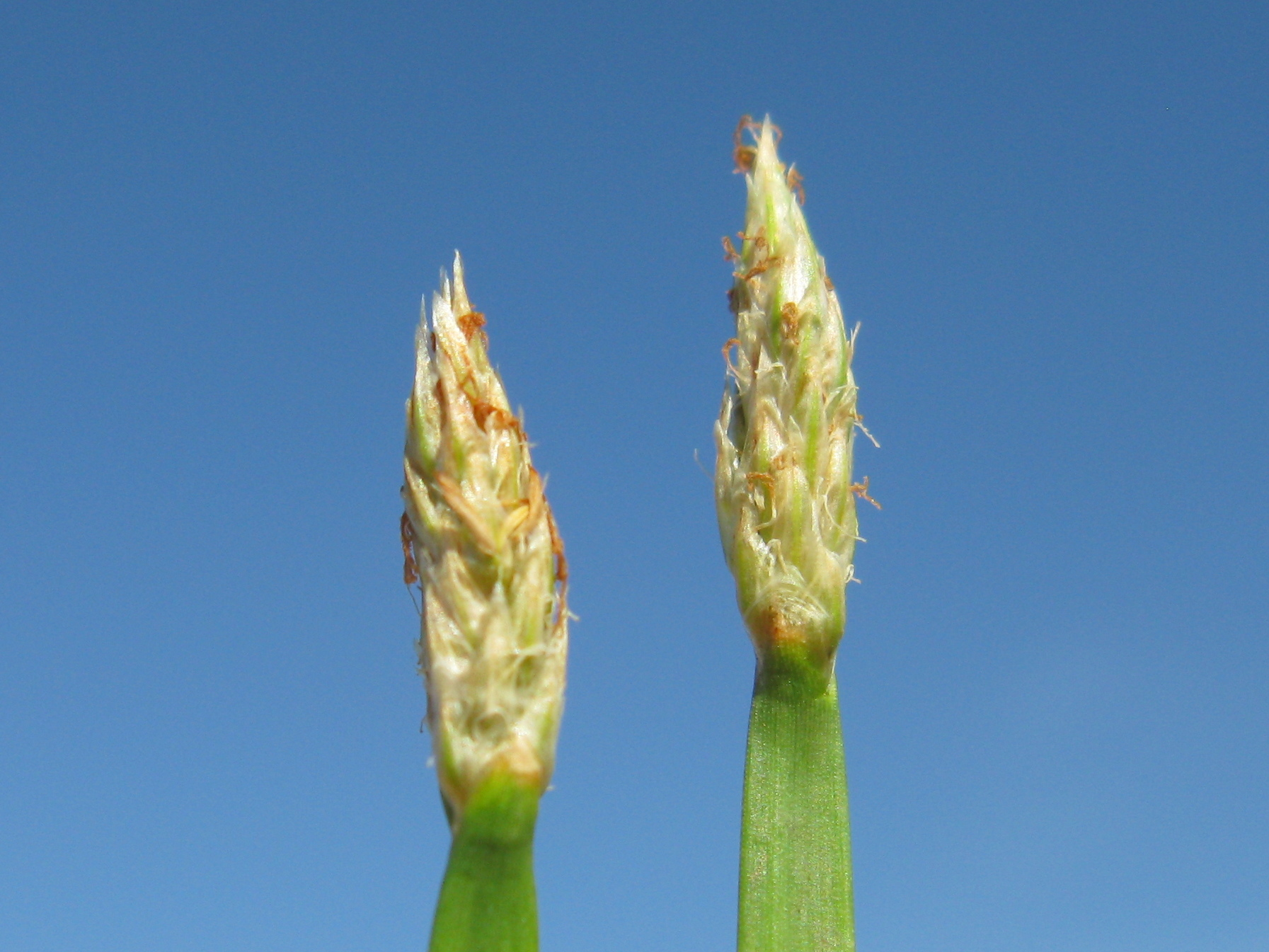

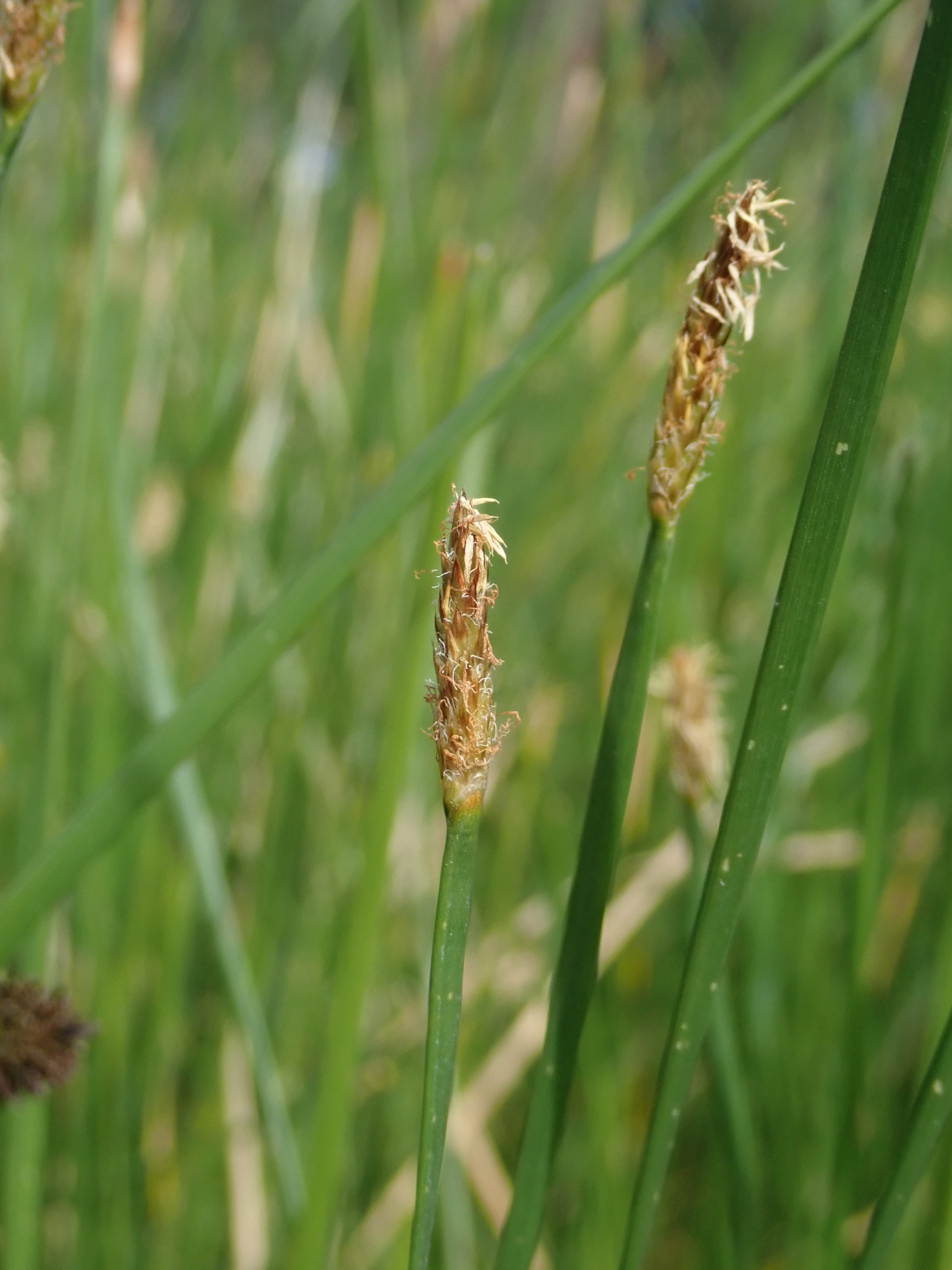

Scientific classification
- Kingdom: Plantae
- Clade: Tracheophytes
- Clade: Angiosperms
- Clade: Monocots
- Clade: Commelinids
- Order: Poales
- Family: Cyperaceae
- Genus: Eleocharis
- Species: E. plana

Binomial name
- Eleocharis plana S.T.Blake

= Eleocharis plana =

Species of plant

Eleocharis plana, the flat spike-sedge, is a flat perennial sedge (in the family Cyperaceae) with creeping rhizomes, which grows up to 80 cm high in moist situations. It is widespread in inland New South Wales, and is also found in Queensland and in South Australia.

The spikelets are narrow and from 10 to 20 mm long (sometimes 40 mm). There are three stamens. The anthers are 1.5–3.1 mm long and the style is trifid.

The nut is obovoid, and from 1.2 to 1.8 mm long and about 1 mm in diameter. It is shining and a bright yellow to brown, with the base of the style base being about half as long and wide as the nut.

It flowers from spring to summer.

Eleocharis plana was first described by Stanley Thatcher Blake in 1938.
