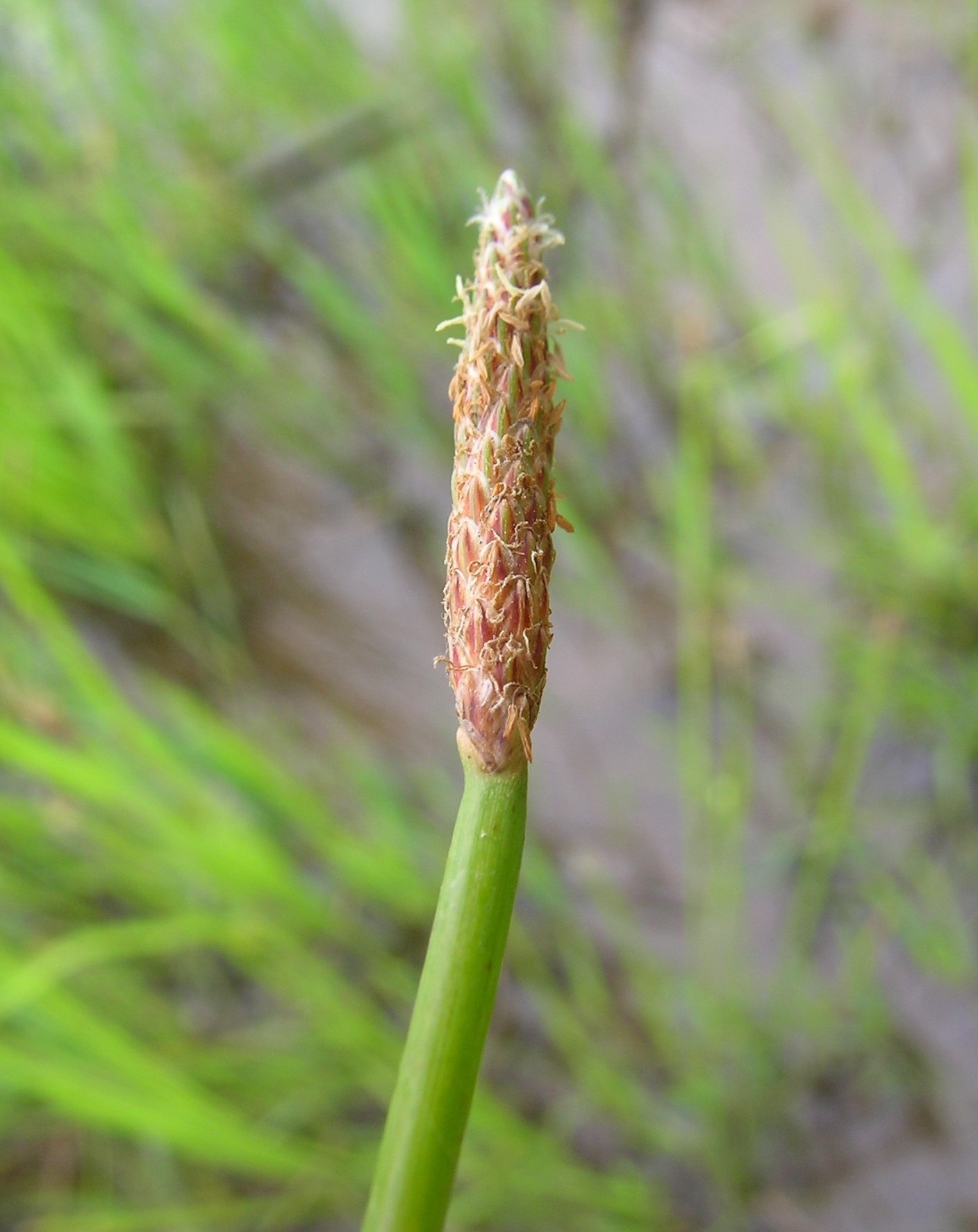

Scientific classification
- Kingdom: Plantae
- Clade: Tracheophytes
- Clade: Angiosperms
- Clade: Monocots
- Clade: Commelinids
- Order: Poales
- Family: Cyperaceae
- Genus: Eleocharis
- Species: E. cylindrostachys

Binomial name
- Eleocharis cylindrostachys Boeckeler

= Eleocharis cylindrostachys =

Species of grass-like plant

Eleocharis cylindrostachys is a rush type plant growing in dense clumps from 40 to 60 cm tall. Found growing in moist situations in New South Wales and Queensland, Australia. The specific epithet cylindrostachys is derived from Latin and refers to “a cylindrical head of corn”.
