= Eleocharis montevidensis =

Sand spikerush

Scientific classification
- Kingdom: Plantae
- Clade: Tracheophytes
- Clade: Angiosperms
- Clade: Monocots
- Clade: Commelinids
- Order: Poales
- Family: Cyperaceae
- Genus: Eleocharis
- Species: E. montevidensis

Binomial name
- Eleocharis montevidensis Kunth

Synonyms
- Limnochloa montevidensis (Kunth) Nees; Scirpus montevidensis (Kunth) Kuntze; Eleocharis montana subsp. montevidensis (Kunth) Osten; Eleocharis arenicola Torr. ex Engelm. & A.Gray; Scirpus arenicola (Torr. ex Engelm. & A.Gray) Kuntze; Trichophyllum arenicola (Torr. ex Engelm. & A.Gray) House; Eleocharis palmeri Svenson; Eleocharis montevidensis f. angustior S.González & McVaugh

Species of grass-like plant

Eleocharis montevidensis is a species of spikesedge known by the common name sand spikerush. It is a widespread coastal plant native to the Americas. It grows in moist, sandy spots in many habitat types, including lakes, riverbanks, wet meadows, and springs. It has a disjunct distribution, in North America (southern United States from California to the Carolinas, Mexico, Guatemala, Honduras) and South America (Brazil, Peru, Argentina, Uruguay).

== Description ==
Eleocharis montevidensis is a rhizomatous perennial herb forming tufts or mats of erect, firm stems up to half a meter tall. The narrow grasslike leaves are dark purplish or reddish brown at the bases, becoming lighter in color toward the tips, and drying to a thin, papery texture. The inflorescence is an oval-shaped spikelet appearing at the tip of the stem. It is under a centimeter long and made up of several flowers covered in brownish bracts.

Eleocharis montevidensis have often been called either E. montana or E. palmeri in some North American publications.

== Cultivation ==
It is sometimes cultivated as an aquatic plant for water gardens.
