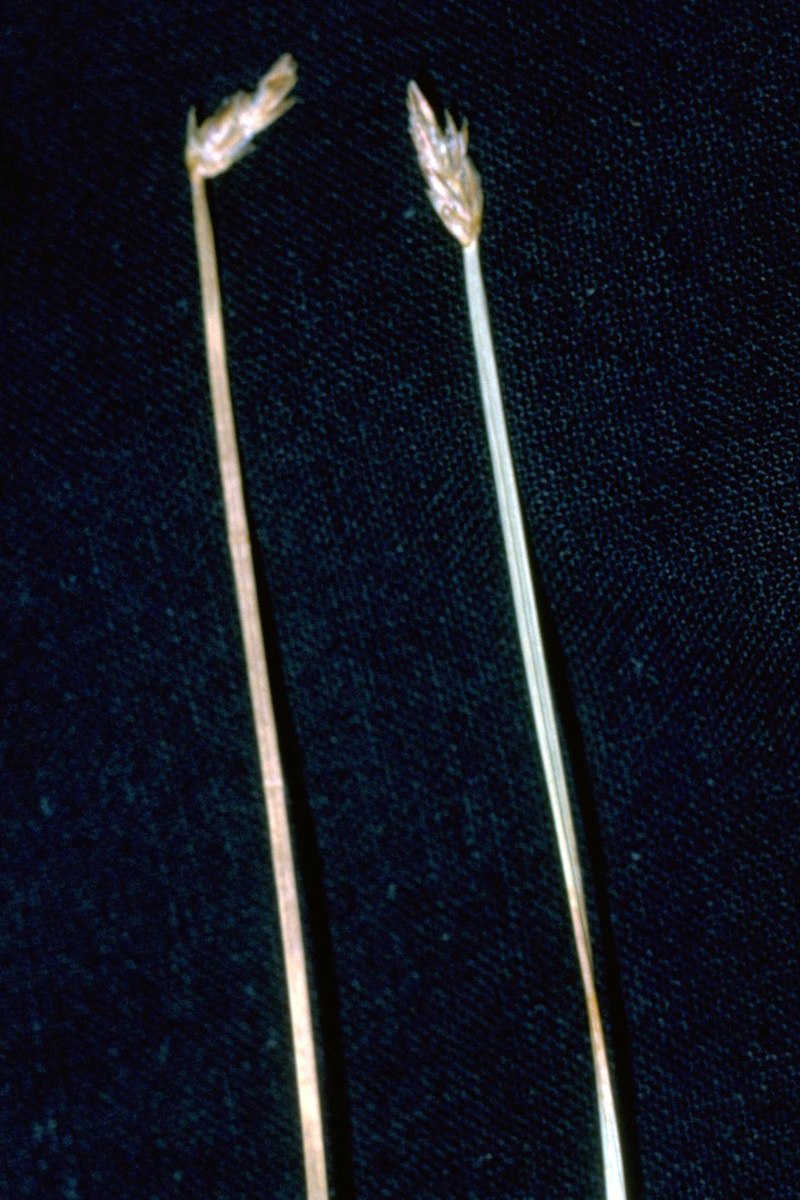

Scientific classification
- Kingdom: Plantae
- Clade: Tracheophytes
- Clade: Angiosperms
- Clade: Monocots
- Clade: Commelinids
- Order: Poales
- Family: Cyperaceae
- Genus: Eleocharis
- Species: E. rostellata

Binomial name
- Eleocharis rostellata Torr.

Synonyms
- Scirpus rostellatus Torr.; Trichophyllum rostellatum (Torr.) Farw.; Eleocharis rostellata var. occidentalis S.Wats.; Eleocharis rostellata var. congdonii Jeps.; Eleocharis rostellata f. occidentalis (S.Watson) Beetle

= Eleocharis rostellata =

Species of grass-like plant

Eleocharis rostellata is a species of spikesedge known by the common name beaked spikerush. It is widespread across North America (including Mexico, Guatemala and the West Indies), with isolated populations in Argentina.

Eleocharis rostellata occurs in many types of wetland habitat, especially saline and alkaline water bodies such as hot springs, fens, and salt marshes.

== Description ==
Eleocharis rostellata is a rhizomatous perennial herb growing up to 1.2 meters tall with spongy, compressible stems. The stem bends and droops and if the tip touches moist soil it may root there and grow more stems. The plant also reproduces by seed and vegetatively by sprouting from bits of rhizome. The inflorescence is a single spikelet up to 2 centimeters long made up of many tiny flowers covered in light brown, sometimes purple-spotted bracts.
