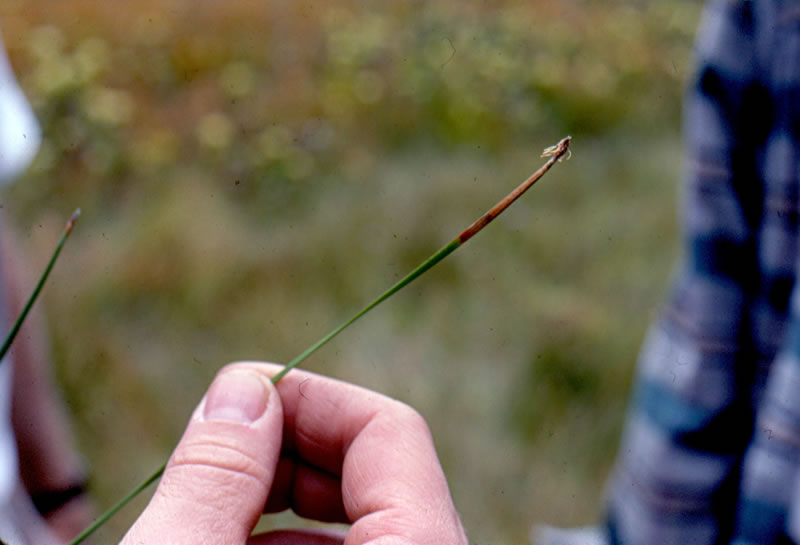

Conservation status
- Critically Imperiled (NatureServe)

Scientific classification
- Kingdom: Plantae
- Clade: Embryophytes
- Clade: Tracheophytes
- Clade: Angiosperms
- Clade: Monocots
- Clade: Commelinids
- Order: Poales
- Family: Cyperaceae
- Genus: Eleocharis
- Species: E. torticulmis

Binomial name
- Eleocharis torticulmis S.G.Sm.

= Eleocharis torticulmis =

Species of grass-like plant

Eleocharis torticulmis is a rare species of flowering plant in the sedge family known by the common names twisted spikerush and twist-stem spikerush. It is endemic to Plumas County, California, where it is known from two locations within a kilometer of each other in the Butterfly Valley Botanical Area. It grows in open wet habitat such as fens and meadows. It was separated from Eleocharis suksdorfiana and described to science as a new species in 2001.

This perennial spikerush grows from a tiny rhizome and a small, hard caudex. It produces a tuft of erect stems 20 to 40 centimeters tall. Each stem is spirally twisted and contracted near the tip, becoming somewhat flattened. The spikelet is under a centimeter long and contains up to 10 tiny flowers.
