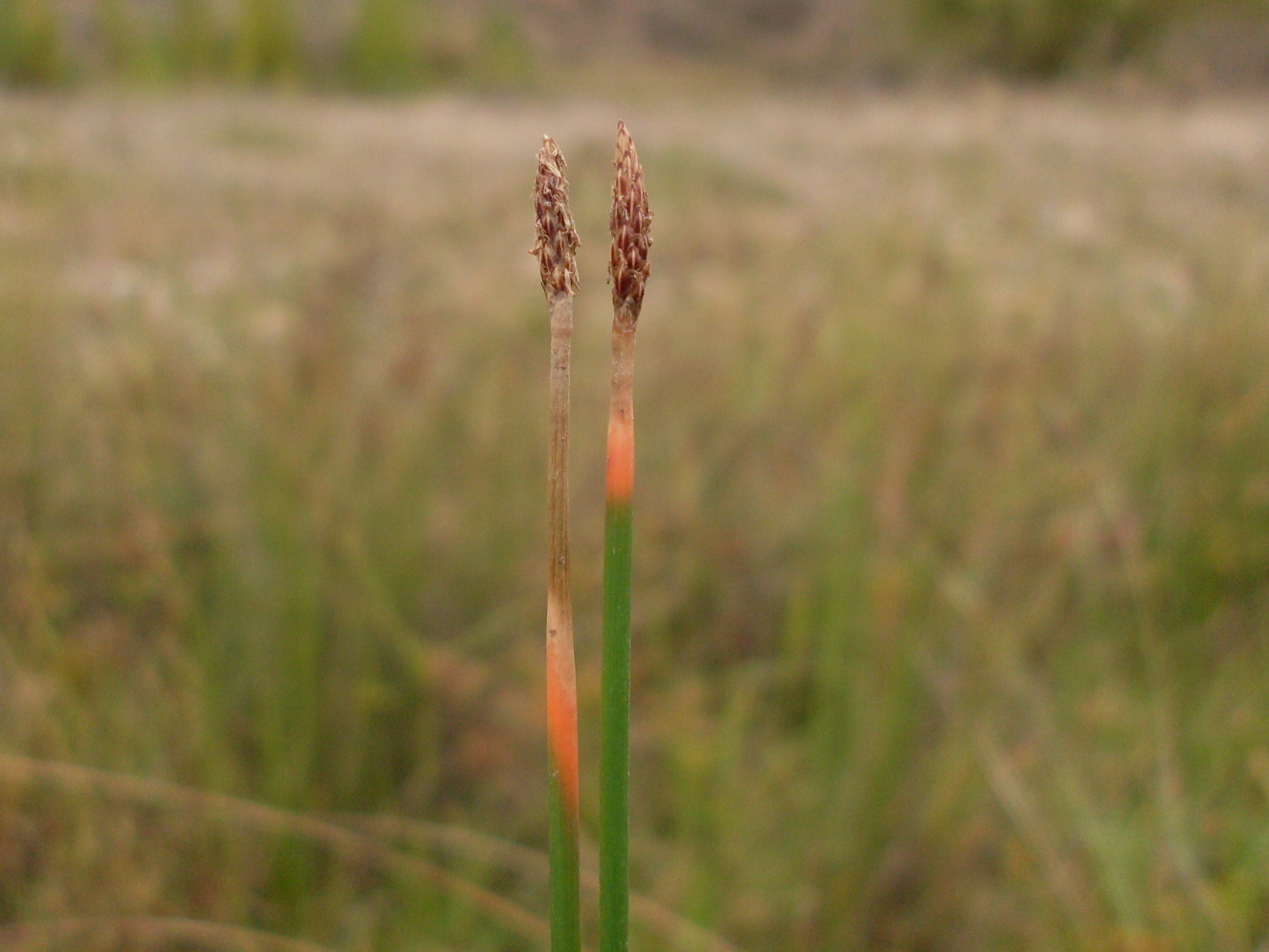

Scientific classification
- Kingdom: Plantae
- Clade: Tracheophytes
- Clade: Angiosperms
- Clade: Monocots
- Clade: Commelinids
- Order: Poales
- Family: Cyperaceae
- Genus: Eleocharis
- Species: E. dietrichiana

Binomial name
- Eleocharis dietrichiana Boeckeler

= Eleocharis dietrichiana =

Species of grass-like plant

Eleocharis dietrichiana is a slender rush type plant growing in clumps from 20 to 40 cm tall. Found growing in moist situations north from Sydney in New South Wales to Queensland, Australia. The specific epithet dietrichiana is named in honour of the German plant collector Amalie Dietrich.
