= Eleocharis macrostachya =

Species of grass-like plant

== Distribution ==
Eleocharis macrostachya
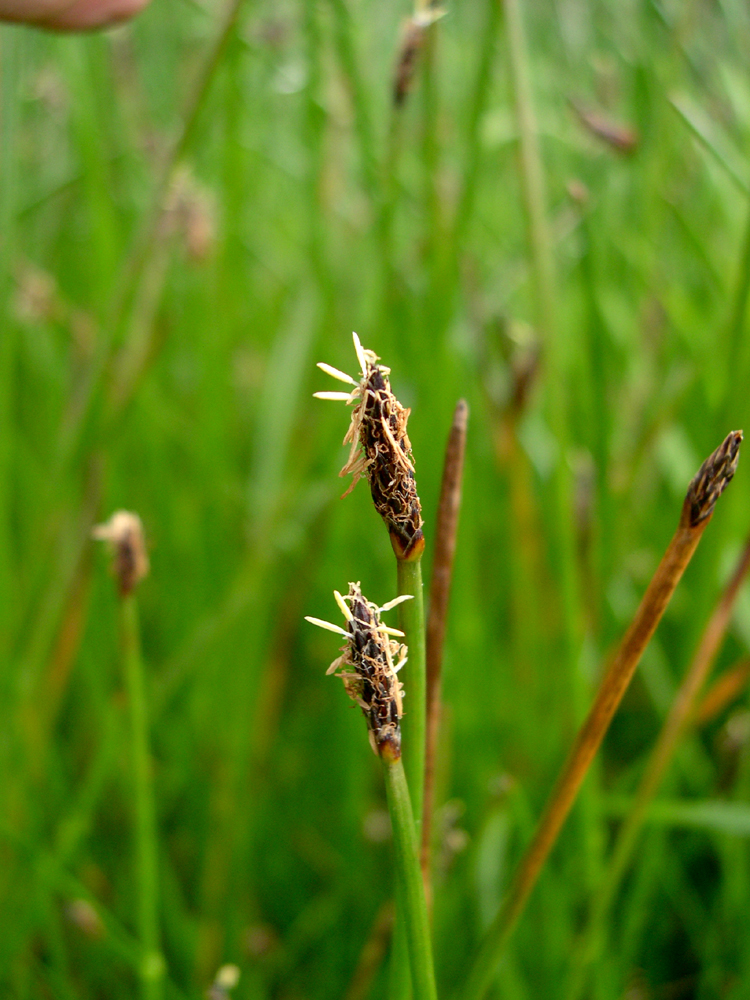

Conservation status
- Least Concern (IUCN 3.1)

Scientific classification
- Kingdom: Plantae
- Clade: Tracheophytes
- Clade: Angiosperms
- Clade: Monocots
- Clade: Commelinids
- Order: Poales
- Family: Cyperaceae
- Genus: Eleocharis
- Species: E. macrostachya

Binomial name
- Eleocharis macrostachya Britt.

Synonyms
- Eleocharis perlonga Fernald & Brackett; Eleocharis xyridiformisFernald & Brackett

Eleocharis macrostachya is a species of spikesedge known by the common name pale spikerush.

It is widely distributed in North America and occurs in parts of South America. It is a plant of varied moist habitats, including freshwater lakes and brackish marshes and ponds, ditches, vernal pools, and wet meadows.

== Description ==
Eleocharis macrostachya is a rhizomatous perennial with bright green erect stems and straw-colored basal leaves, typically reaching heights between one half and one meter. At the top of each stem is a narrow, lance-shaped or cylindrical inflorescence, featuring a single spike ranging from 5 to 40 mm long. This spike contains 30 to 80 spirally arranged florets, each under a scale measuring 2 to 5.5 mm, usually reddish or orange-brown. The lowest scale wraps around 75-100% of the stem without a flower, and the second lowest may or may not have a flower. The leaves are bladeless sheaths on the lower stem, and the upper sheath is firm and often reddish towards the base. Stems, which are erect with up to 25 vertical ribs, form colonies from long rhizomes.

Each flower produces a single seed (achene) that drops independently of the scale. Achenes are 1.1 to 1.9 mm long, yellowish to dark brown, with a distinct tubercle at the tip, measuring one or two millimeters long. Tubercles are whitish to dark brown, pyramidal, .3 to .7 mm long. Additionally, around the achene are 4 barbed bristles, pale brown to whitish, and they may sometimes be absent.

== Use in phytoremediation ==
E. macrostachya has been studied as part of wetland restoration, as well as the removal of arsenic in groundwater via rhizofiltration as part of phytoremediation. Wetlands have the capacity to remove many conventional contaminants from wastewater, even in highly saline water. Olmos-Marquez (2012) identified E. macrostachya as having the greatest arsenic retention in an experimental wetland, suggesting that it acts as a rhizofiltrator.
