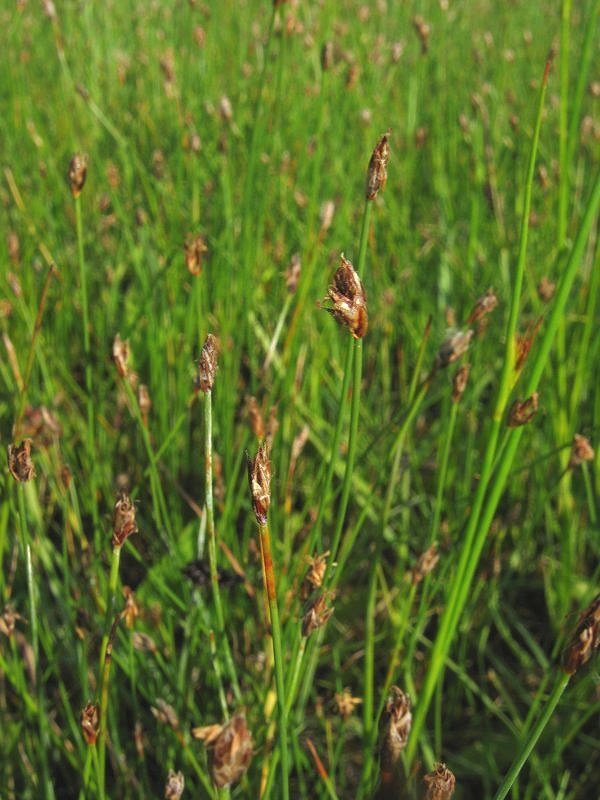

Scientific classification
- Kingdom: Plantae
- Clade: Embryophytes
- Clade: Tracheophytes
- Clade: Angiosperms
- Clade: Monocots
- Clade: Commelinids
- Order: Poales
- Family: Cyperaceae
- Genus: Eleocharis
- Species: E. quinqueflora

Binomial name
- Eleocharis quinqueflora (Hartmann) O. Schwarz

Synonyms
- List: Baeothryon halleri (Vill.) T.Nees; Baeothryon pauciflorum (Lightf.) A.Dietr.; Clavula boeotryon (L.f.) Dumort.; Cyperus pauciflorus (Lightf.) Missbach & E.H.L.Krause; Eleocharis atacamensis Phil.; Eleocharis baeothryon (L.f.) Nees; Eleocharis baeothryon Schult.; Eleocharis czernjajevi Zoz; Eleocharis fernaldii (Svenson) Á.Löve; Eleocharis meridionalis Zinserl.; Eleocharis obscura T.Koyama; Eleocharis pauciflora (Lightf.) Link; Eleocharis pauciflora var. fernaldii Svenson; Eleocharis quinqueflora subsp. fernaldii (Svenson) Hultén; Eleocharis quinqueflora subsp. meridionalis (Zinserl.) T.V.Egorova; Eleocharis vierhapperi Bojko; Isolepis andina Phil.; Limnochloa baeothryon (L.f.) Rchb.; Limnochloa pauciflora (Lightf.) Peterm.; Scirpus atacamensis (Phil.) Kuntze; Scirpus baeothryon L.f.; Scirpus campestris Rottb.; Scirpus cespitosus Pollich; Scirpus graecus Quézel & Contandr.; Scirpus halleri Vill.; Scirpus pauciflorus Lightf.; Scirpus pauciflorus var. fernaldii (Svenson) Hiitonen; Scirpus quinqueflorus Hartmann; Scirpus sepium Honck.; Trichophorum pauciflorum (Lightf.) Pignatti; Trichophorum vierhapperi (Bojko) Pignatti

= Eleocharis quinqueflora =

Fewflower spikerush

Species of grass-like plant

Eleocharis quinqueflora is a species of spikesedge known by the common names fewflower spikerush and few-flowered spike-rush. It is widespread across Europe, North Africa, northern Asia (Siberia, China, Kazakhstan, Himalayas, etc.), and North America (Canada, Greenland, northern and western US). There are also isolated populations in Argentina and Chile.

Eleocharis quinqueflorais a resident of wet meadows, bogs, hot springs, and other moist places. This is a rhizomatous perennial approaching a maximum height of 40 centimeters. The thin, flattened stems are surrounded by papery reddish to green leaf sheaths and topped with dark inflorescences. The spikelet is lance-shaped to oval and less than a centimeter long. It contains two to seven flowers, each of which is covered with a brown or black bract. The fruit is a yellow-brown achene two or three millimeters long.
