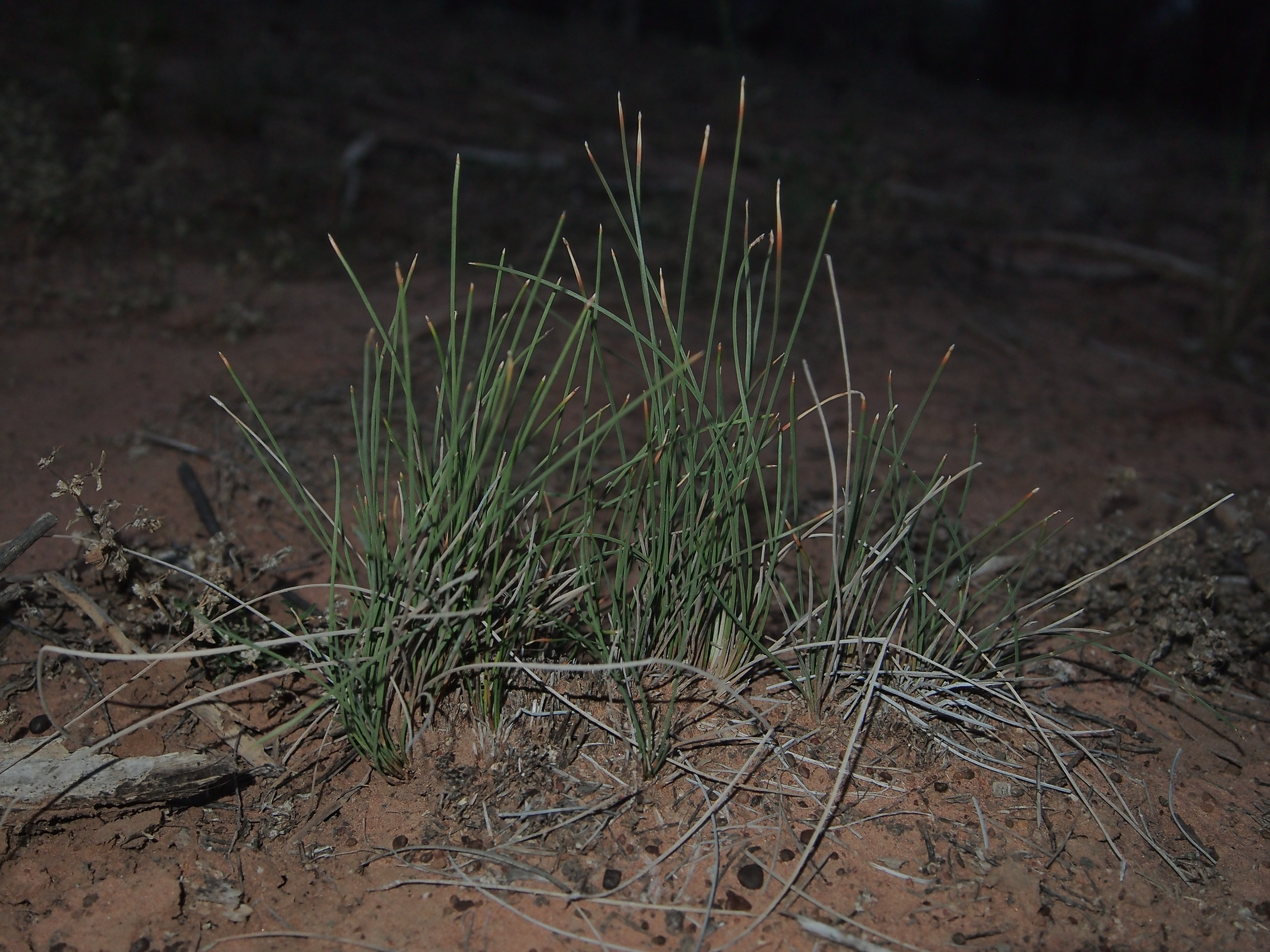

Scientific classification
- Kingdom: Plantae
- Clade: Tracheophytes
- Clade: Angiosperms
- Clade: Monocots
- Clade: Commelinids
- Order: Poales
- Family: Cyperaceae
- Genus: Eleocharis
- Species: E. pallens

Binomial name
- Eleocharis pallens S.T.Blake

= Eleocharis pallens =

Species of grass-like plant

Eleocharis pallens, commonly known as pale spikerush, is a sedge of the family Cyperaceae that is native to Australia.

The perennial herb to grass-like sedge typically grows to a height of 0.5 metres (1.6 ft) and has a tufted habit. It blooms between July and August and produces green flowers.

It is found in and around swampy areas and pools in the Pilbara, Gascoyne and Goldfields-Esperance regions of Western Australia and the top end of the Northern Territory.
