= List of C4 plants =

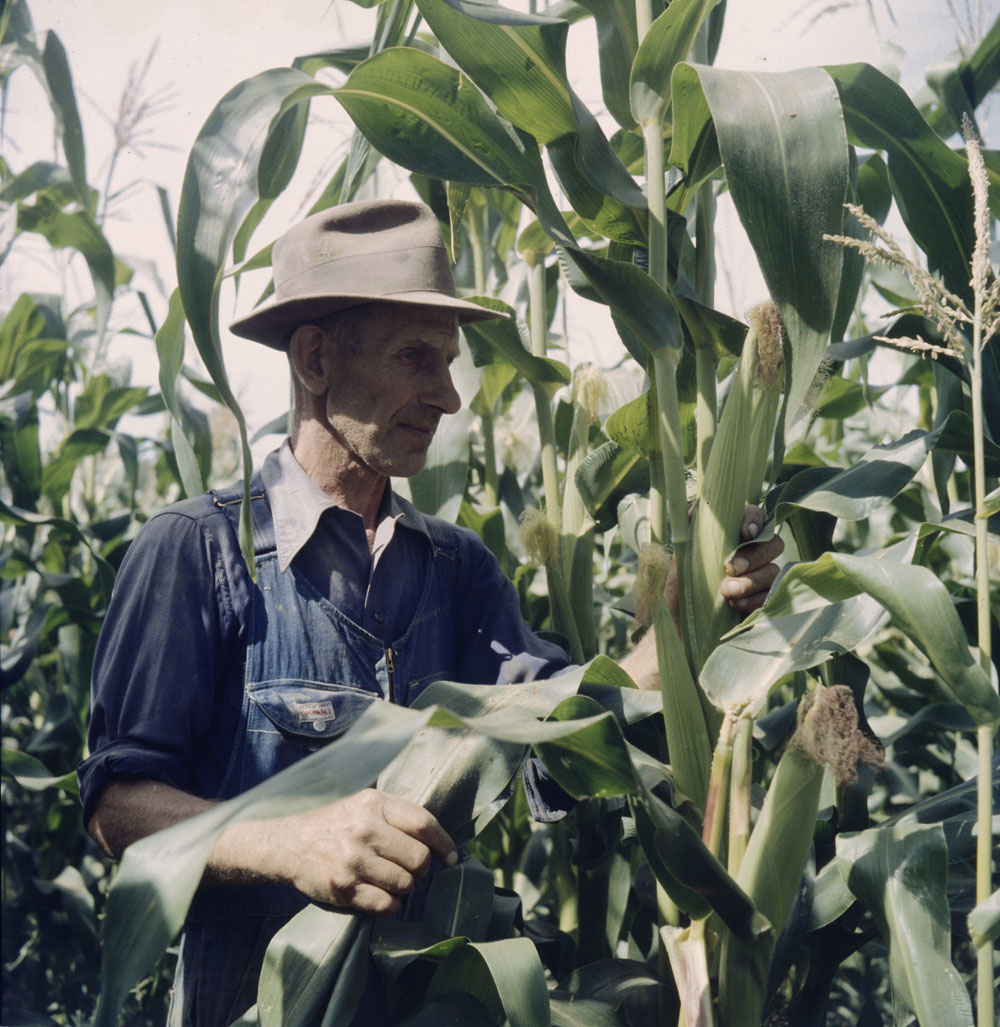
Maize (Zea mays, Poaceae) is the most widely cultivated C_{4} plant.

In botany, C_{4} carbon fixation is one of three known methods of photosynthesis used by plants. C_{4} plants increase their photosynthetic efficiency by reducing or suppressing photorespiration, which mainly occurs under low atmospheric CO_{2} concentration, high light, high temperature, drought, and salinity. There are roughly 8,100 known C_{4} species, which belong to at least 61 distinct evolutionary lineages in 19 families (as per APG IV classification) of flowering plants. Among these are important crops such as maize, sorghum and sugarcane, but also weeds and invasive plants. Although only 3% of flowering plant species use C_{4} carbon fixation, they account for 23% of global primary production. The repeated, convergent C_{4} evolution from C_{3} ancestors has spurred hopes to bio-engineer the C_{4} pathway into C_{3} crops such as rice.

C_{4} photosynthesis probably first evolved 30–35 million years ago in the Oligocene, and further origins occurred since, most of them in the last 15 million years. C_{4} plants are mainly found in tropical and warm-temperate regions, predominantly in open grasslands where they are often dominant. While most are graminoids, other growth forms such as forbs, vines, shrubs, and even some trees and aquatic plants are also known among C_{4} plants.

C_{4} plants are usually identified by their higher ^{13}C/^{12}C isotopic ratio compared to C_{3} plants or their typical leaf anatomy. The distribution of C_{4} lineages among plants has been determined through phylogenetics and was considered well known as of 2016. Monocots – mainly grasses (Poaceae) and sedges (Cyperaceae) – account for around 80% of C_{4} species, but they are also found in the eudicots. Moreover, almost all C_{4} plants are herbaceus, with the notable exception of some woody species from the Euphorbia genus, such as the tree Euphorbia olowaluana. The reason behind C_{4} metabolism extreme rarity in trees is debated: hypotheses vary from a possible reduction in photosynthetic quantum yield under dense canopy conditions, coupled with an increased metabolic energy consumption (inherent to C_{4} metabolism itself), to less efficient sunflecks utilization.

The following list presents known C_{4} lineages by family, based on the overview by Sage (2016). They correspond to single species or clades thought to have acquired the C_{4} pathway independently. In some lineages that also include C_{3} and C_{3}–C_{4} intermediate species, the C_{4} pathway may have evolved more than once.

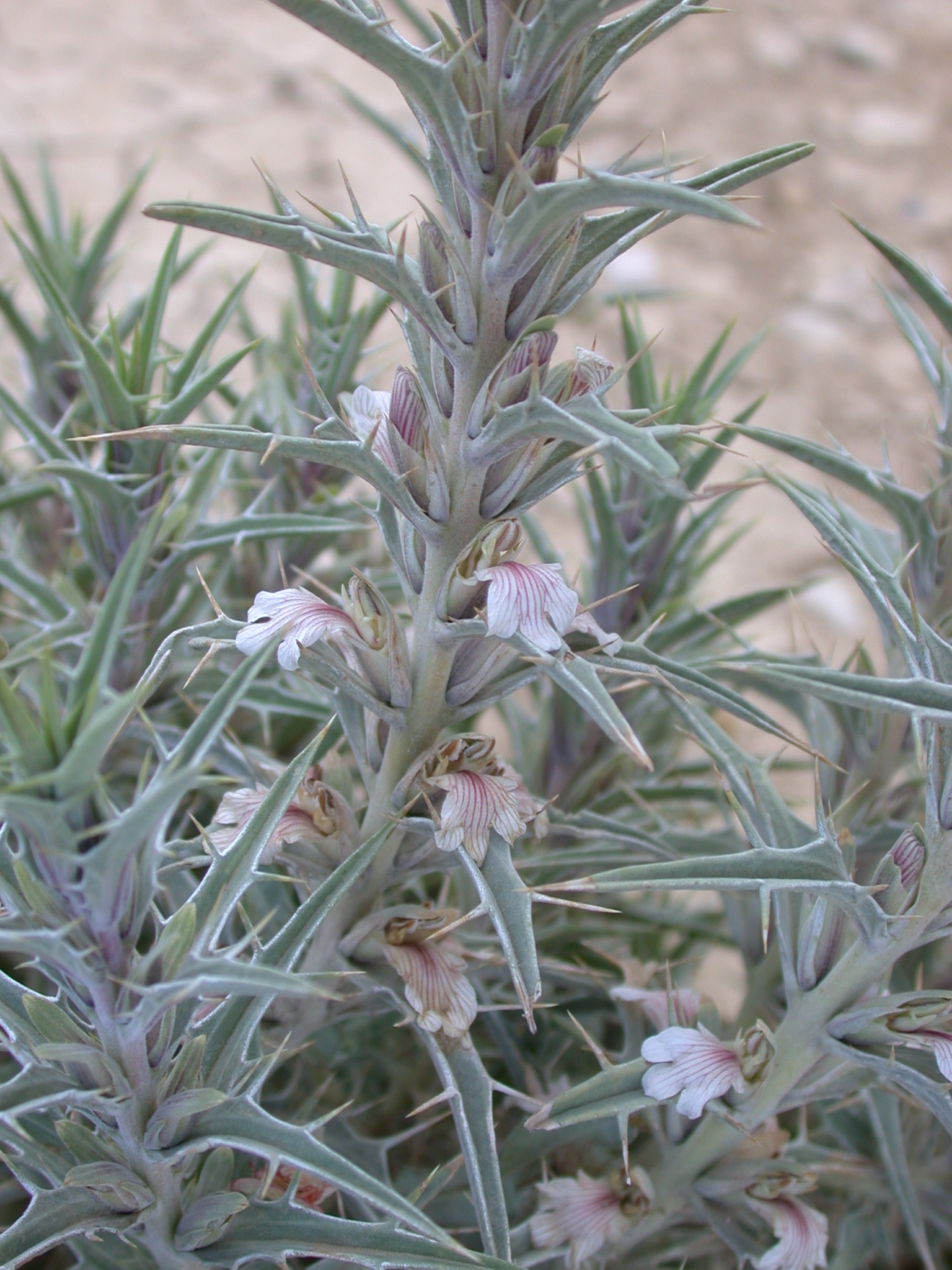
Blepharis attenuata (Acanthaceae) grows in deserts.

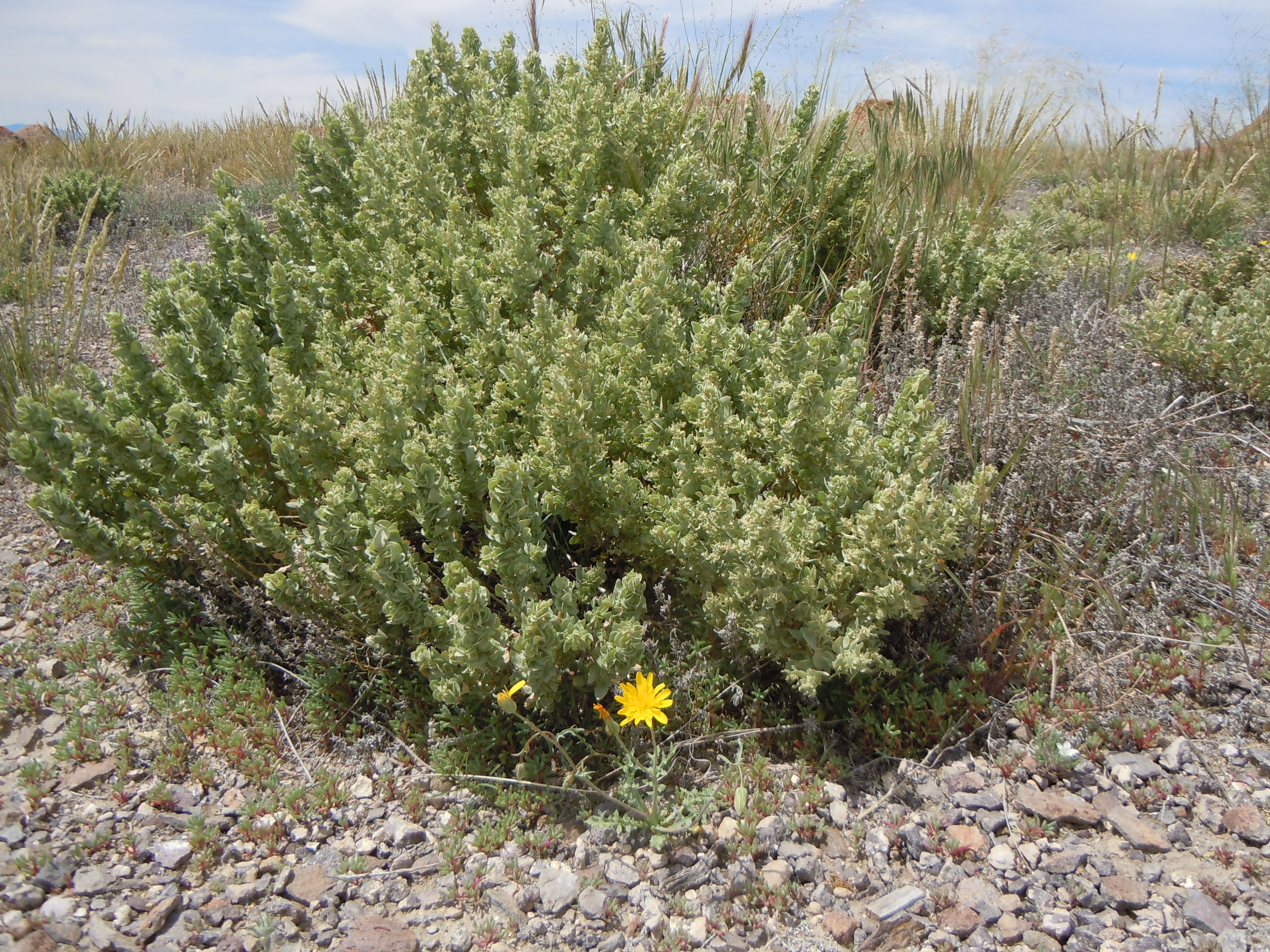
Shadscale (Atriplex confertifolia, Amaranthaceae) is a halophytic shrub common in steppes of western North America.

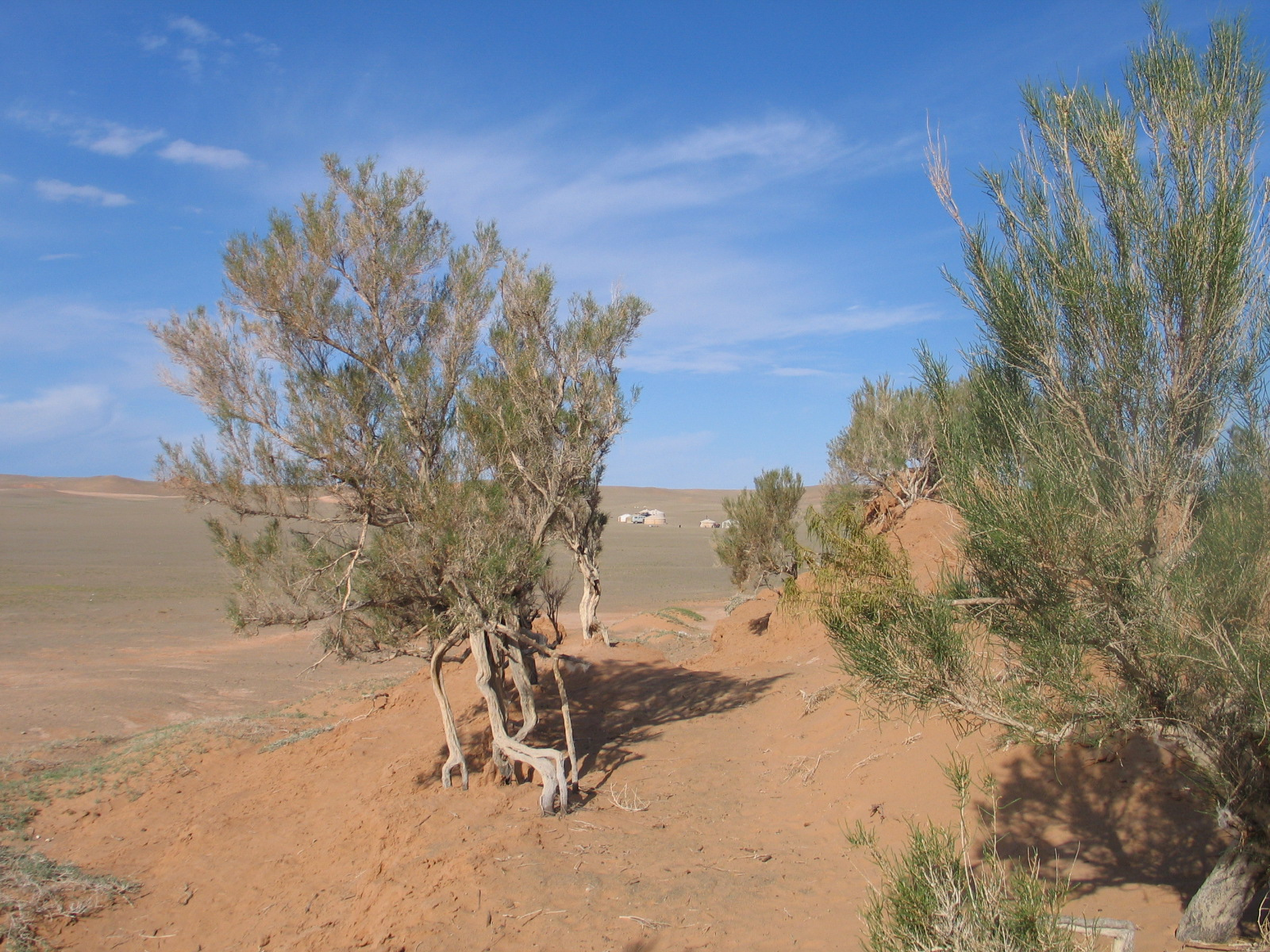
Black saxaul (Haloxylon ammodendron, Amaranthaceae) provided fuel for caravans following the Silk Road in Central Asia.

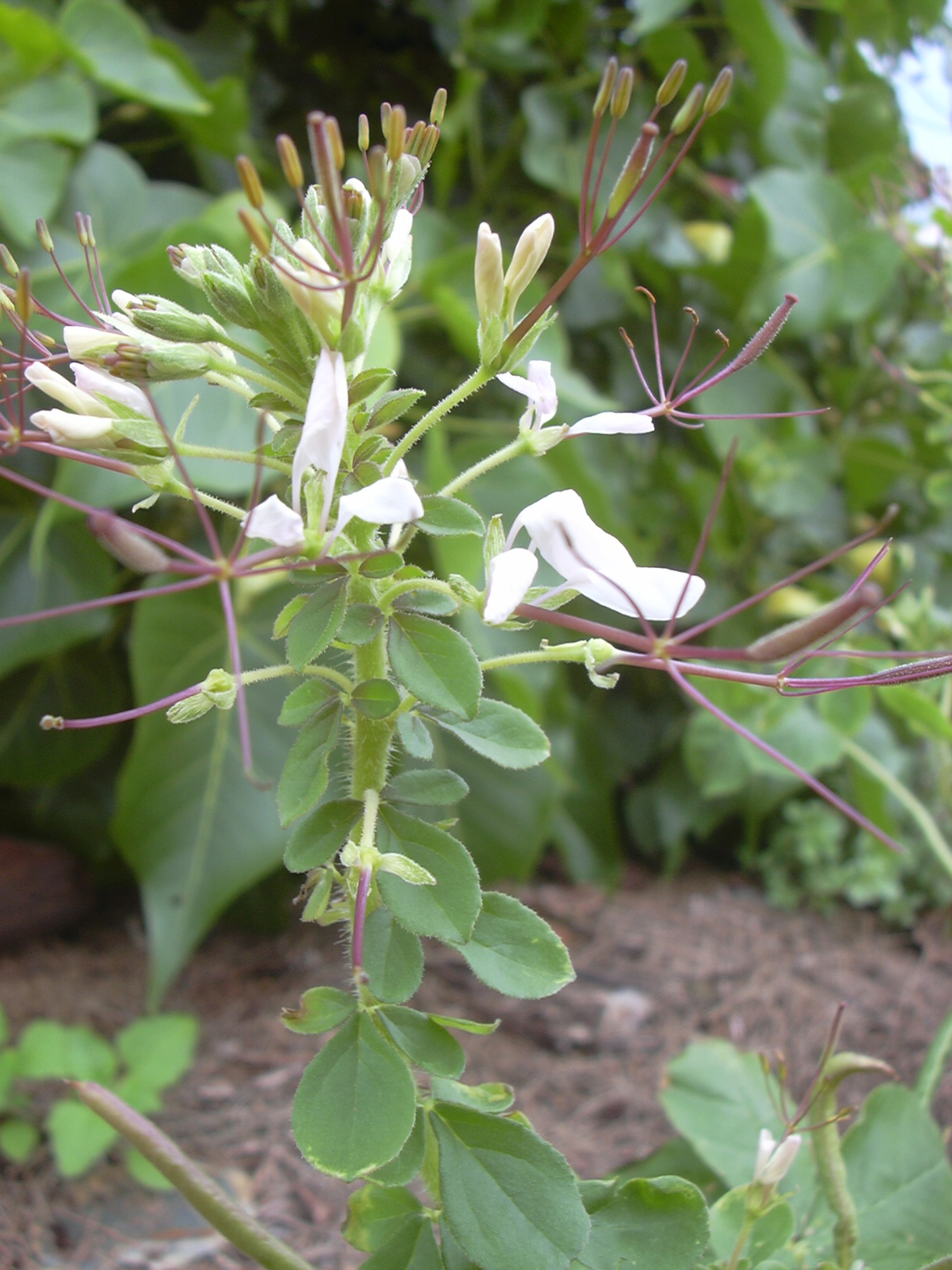
Cleome gynandra (Cleomaceae) has been a C_{4} model plant.

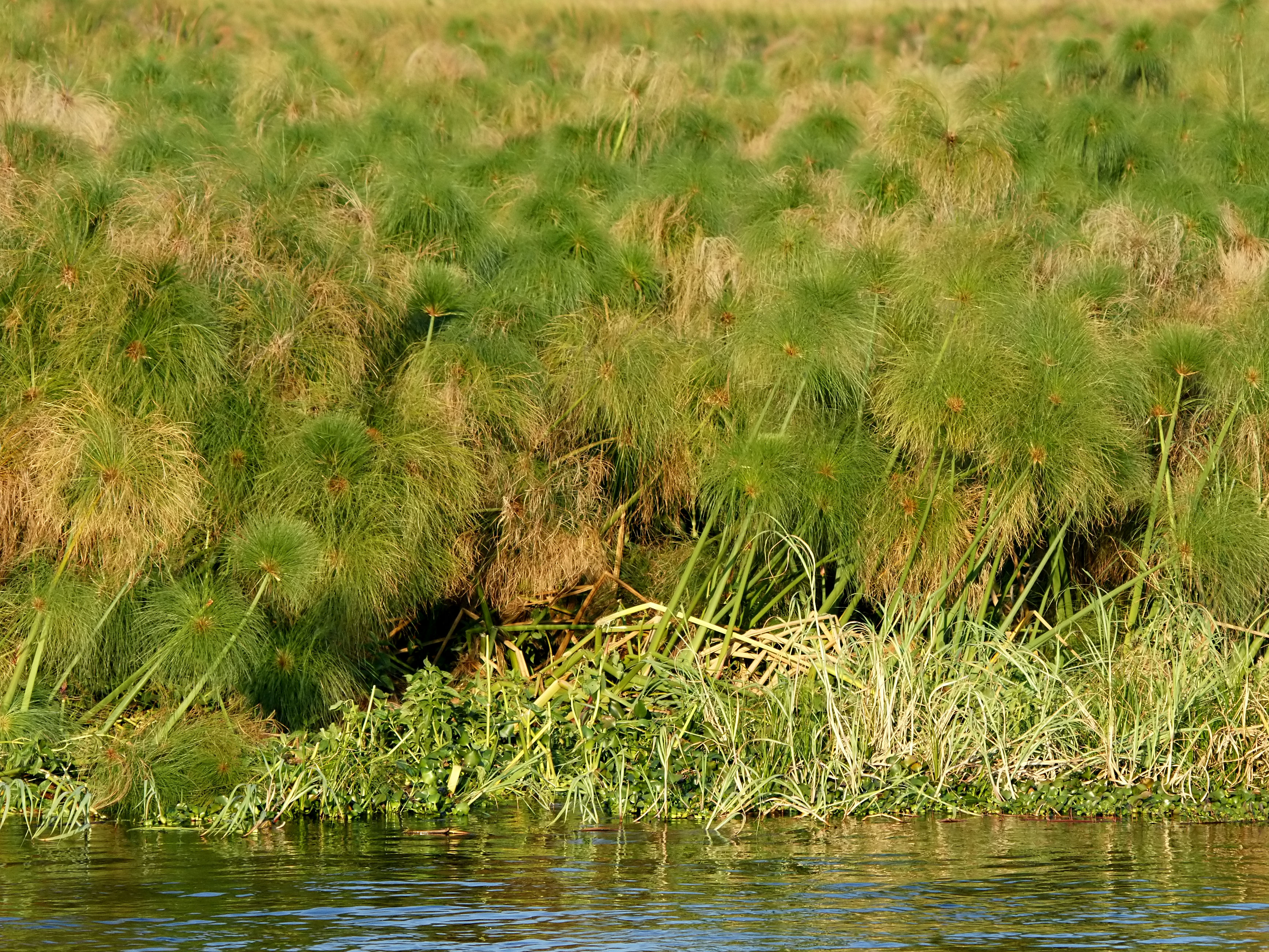
Papyrus (Cyperus papyrus, Cyperaceae) has been of major cultural importance.

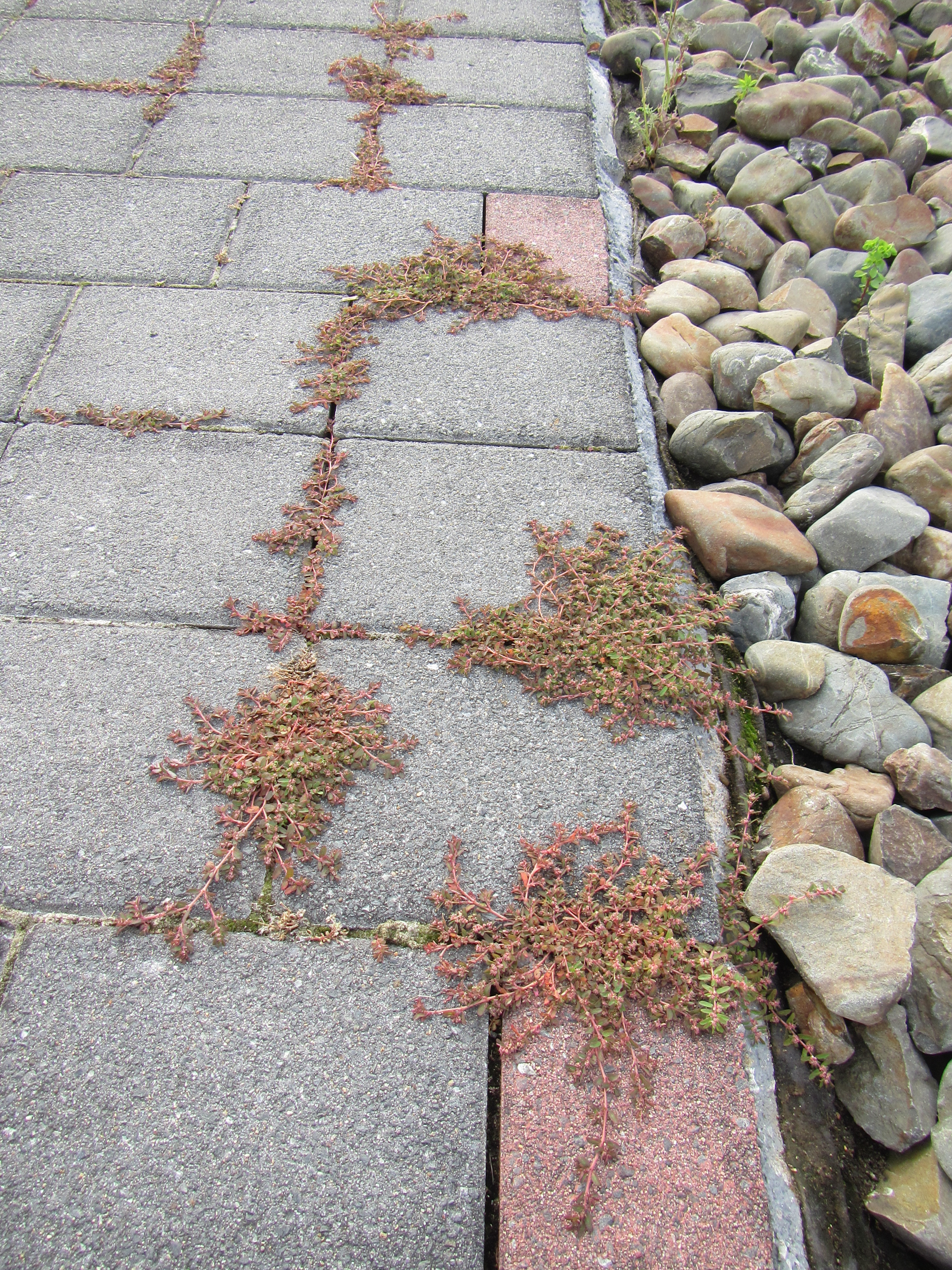
Spotted spurge (Euphorbia maculata, Euphorbiaceae) commonly grows in sidewalk cracks in North America.

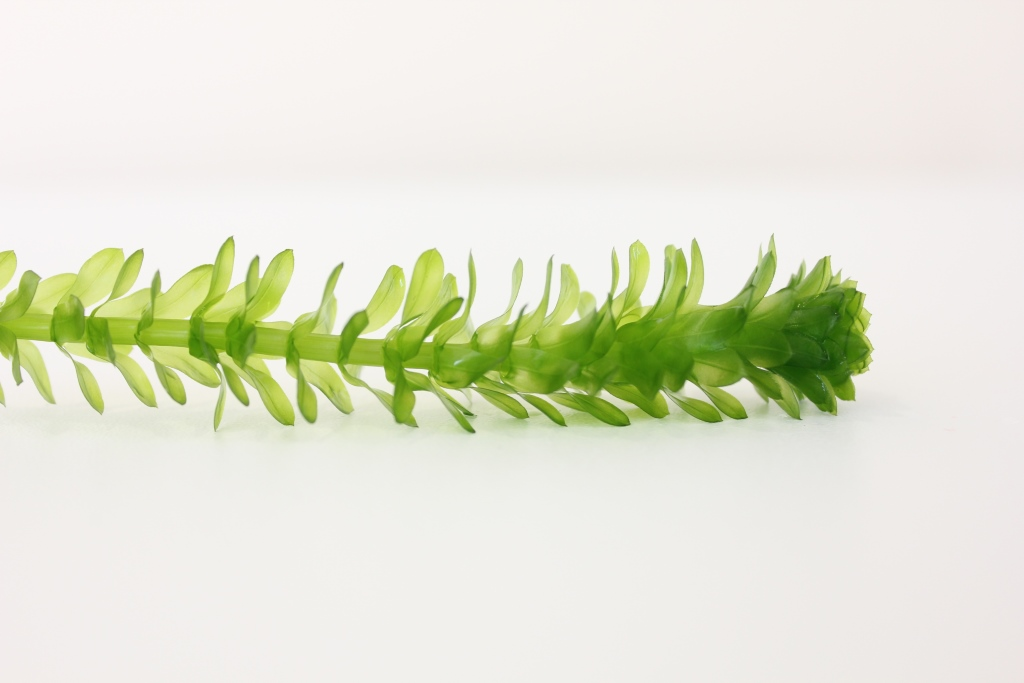
The aquatic Egeria densa (Hydrocharitaceae) uses the C_{4} pathway under high temperature and light intensity.

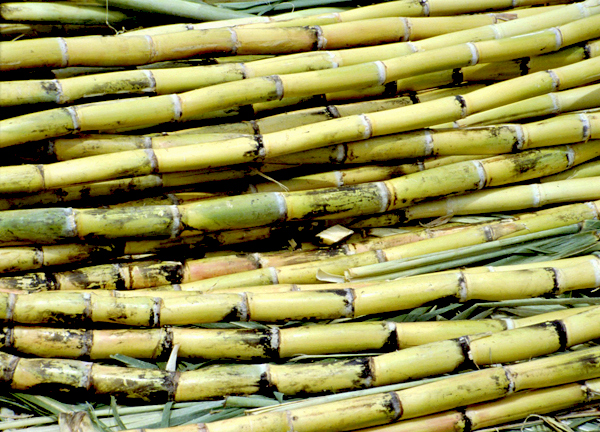
Sugarcane (Saccharum officinarum, Poaceae) is grown for sugar and bioethanol.

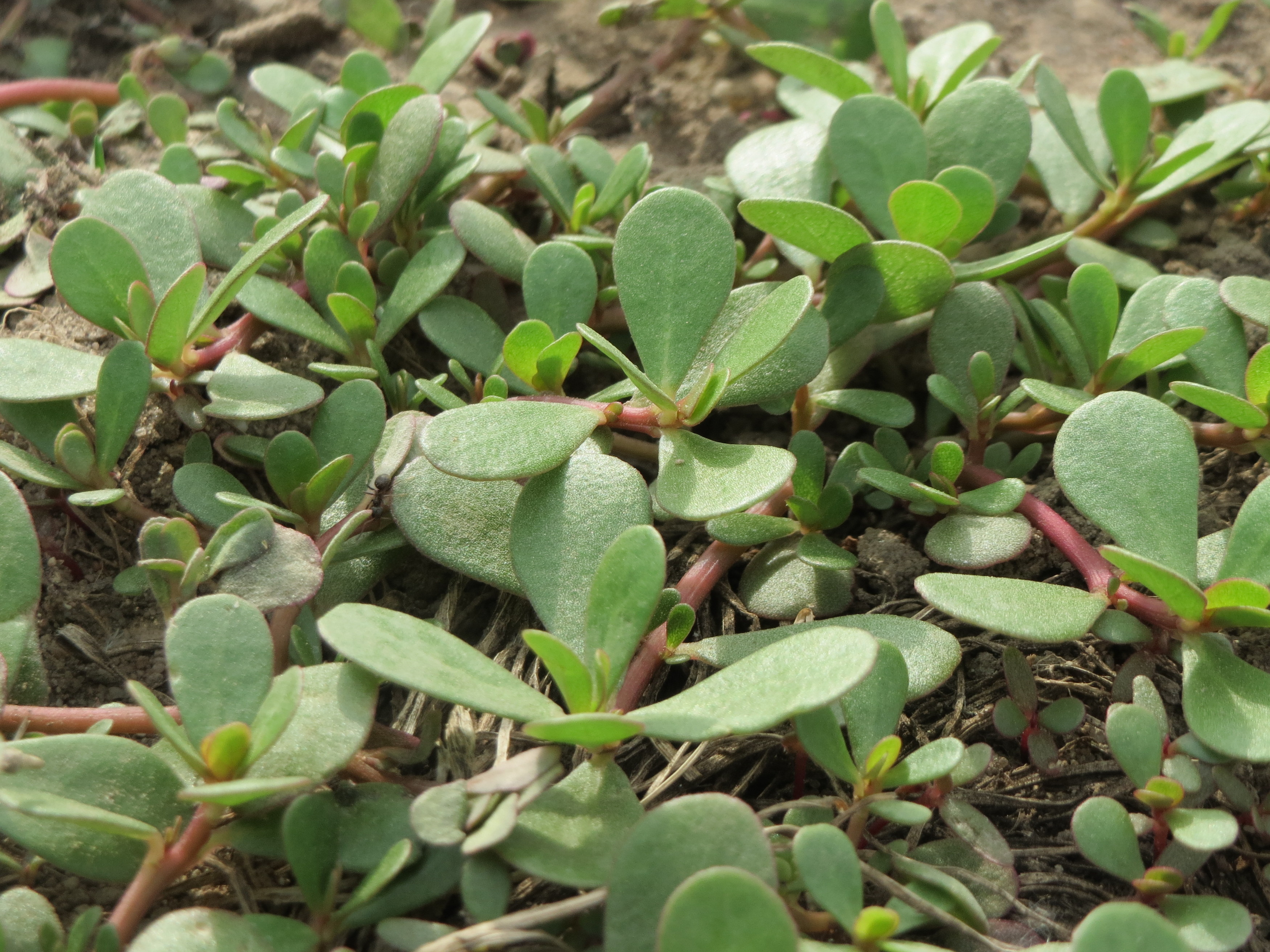
Purslane (Portulaca oleracea, Portulacaceae), a weed and ancient vegetable, uses both C_{4} and CAM photosynthesis.

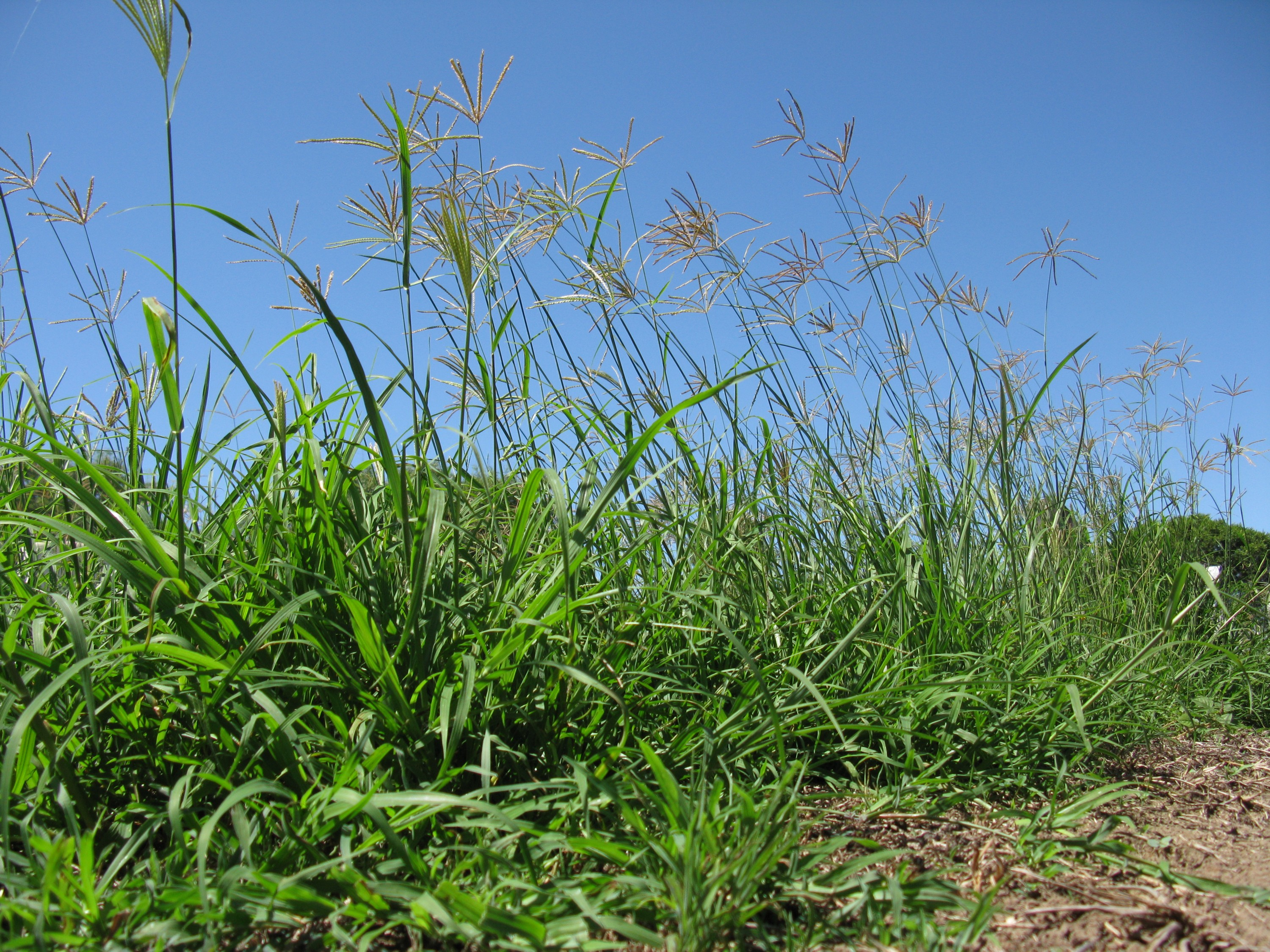
Rhodes grass (Chloris gayana, Poaceae) is a major forage grass in tropical areas.

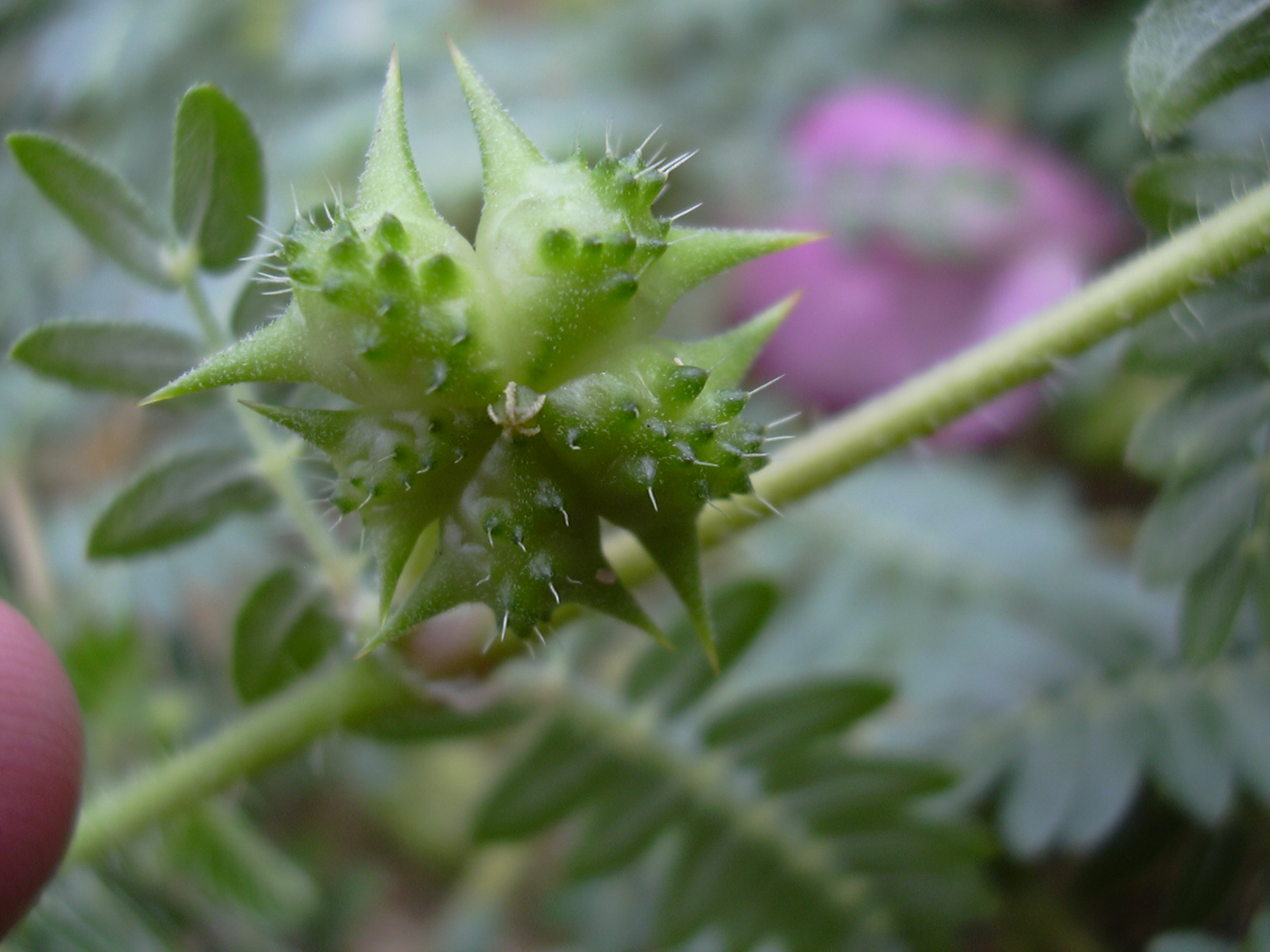
The spiny fruits of puncture vine (Tribulus terrestris, Zygophyllaceae) may even puncture tyres.

== Acanthaceae ==
The large acanthus family Acanthaceae includes one genus with C_{4} species, found in dry habitats from Africa to Asia.

- Blepharis – 15 C_{4} species, 1–4 origins

== Aizoaceae ==
While many species in the ice plant family Aizoaceae use crassulacean acid metabolism (CAM), one subfamily with drought-tolerant and halophytic plants includes C_{4} species:

- Sesuvioideae – 30 C_{4} species, 1–6 origins

== Amaranthaceae ==
The amaranth family Amaranthaceae (including the former goosefoot family Chenopodiaceae) contains around 800 known C_{4} species, which belong to 14 distinct lineages in seven subfamilies. This makes Amaranthaceae the family with most C_{4} species and lineages among the eudicots. Suaeda aralocaspica and species of the genus Bienertia use a particular, single-cell type of C_{4} carbon fixation.

- Aerva (Amaranthoideae) – 4 C_{4} species
- Alternanthera (Gomphrenoideae) – 17 C_{4} species (also includes C_{3}–C_{4} intermediates)
- Amaranthus (Amaranthoideae) – 90 C_{4} species
- Atriplex (Chenopodioideae) – around 180 C_{4} species
- Bassia–Camphorosma clade (Camphorosmoideae) – 24 C_{4} species (also includes one C_{3}–C_{4} intermediate), 1–2 origins
- Bienertia (Suaedoideae) – 3 C_{4} species
- Caroxyleae (syn. Caroxyloneae, Salsoloideae) – 157 C_{4} species
- Gomphrenoids (Gomphrenoideae) – 138 C_{4} species
- Salsoleae (Salsoloideae) – 158 C_{4} species, 2–4 origins
- Suaeda aralocaspica (Suaedoideae)
- Suaeda sect. Salsina – 30 C_{4} species
- Suaeda sect. Schoberia – 9 C_{4} species
- Tecticornia – (Salicornioideae) 2 C_{4} species
- Tidestromia (Gomphrenoideae) – 8 C_{4} species

== Asteraceae ==
The composite family Asteraceae contains three C_{4} lineages, in two different tribes of subfamily Asteroideae. They include the model genus Flaveria with closely related C_{3}, C_{4}, and intermediate species.

- Flaveria (Tageteae) – 7 C_{4} species, 2–3 origins (also includes C_{3} and intermediate)
- Coreopsideae – 41 C_{4} species
- Pectis (Tageteae) – 90 C_{4} species

== Boraginaceae ==
The borage family Boraginaceae contains one widespread C_{4} genus, Euploca, which has also been treated as part of a distinct family Heliotropiaceae.

- Euploca (also includes C_{3}–C_{4} intermediates) – 130 C_{4} species, 1–3 origins

== Cleomaceae ==
The Cleomaceae, formerly included in the caper family Capparaceae, contains three C_{4} species in genus Cleome. These three species independently acquired the C_{4} pathway; the genus also contains numerous C_{3} as well as C_{3}–C_{4} intermediate species.

- Cleome angustifolia
- C. gynandra
- C. oxalidea

== Caryophyllaceae ==
In the carnation family Caryophyllaceae, the C_{4} pathway evolved once, in a clade within the polyphyletic genus Polycarpaea.

- Polycarpaea – 20 C_{4} species

== Cyperaceae ==
The sedge family Cyperaceae is second only to the grasses in number of C_{4} species. Prominent C_{4} sedges include culturally important species such as papyrus (Cyperus papyrus) and chufa (C. esculentus) but also purple nutsedge (C. rotundus), one of the world's major weeds. Eleocharis vivipara uses C_{3} carbon fixation in underwater leaves and C_{4} carbon fixation in aerial leaves.

- Bulbostylis – 211 C_{4} species
- Cyperus – 757 C_{4} species
- Eleocharis ser. Tenuissimae – 10 C_{4} species
- Eleocharis vivipara
- Fimbristylis – 303 C_{4} species
- Rhynchospora – 40 C_{4} species

== Euphorbiaceae ==
The spurge family Euphorbiaceae contains the largest single C_{4} lineage among eudicots. The C_{4} spurges are diverse and widespread; they range from weedy herbs to the only known C_{4} trees – four species from Hawaii, including Euphorbia olowaluana (up to 10 m) and E. herbstii (up to 8 m).

- Euphorbia subgenus Chamaesyce section Anisophyllum (also treated as genus Chamaesyce) – 350 C_{4} species (also including C_{3} and C_{3}–C_{4} intermediate species)

== Gisekiaceae ==
Contains a C_{4} genus with a single species.

- Gisekia pharnaceoides

== Hydrocharitaceae ==
Includes the only known aquatic C_{4} plants.

- Egeria densa
- Hydrilla verticillata

== Molluginaceae ==
The two C_{4} species within the same genus have acquired the pathway independently.

- Mollugo – 2 C_{4} species, 2 origins

== Nyctaginaceae ==
- Allionia – 2 C_{4} species
- Boerhavia – 42 C_{4} species

== Polygonaceae ==
- Calligonum – 80 C_{4} species

== Portulacaceae ==
The single genus of this family forms one C_{4} lineage. CAM photosynthesis is also known. Common purslane (Portulaca oleracea) is a major weed but also a vegetable.

- Portulaca – 100 C_{4} species, 1–2 origins

== Poaceae ==
The grass family includes most of the known C_{4} species – around 5000. They are only found in subfamilies of the PACMAD clade. Major C_{4} crops such as maize, sugarcane, sorghum and pearl millet belong in this family. The only known species with C_{3}, C_{4} and intermediate variants, Alloteropsis semialata, is a grass.

- Aristida – 288 C_{4} species
- Stipagrostis – 56 C_{4} species
- Chloridoideae (without Centropodieae) – 1596 C_{4} species
- Centropodia – 4 C_{4} species
- Eriachne – 50 C_{4} species
- Tristachyideae – 87 C_{4} species
- Andropogoneae – 1228 C_{4} species (incl. maize, sugarcane, sorghum)
- Reynaudia filiformis
- Axonopus – 90 C_{4} species
- Paspalum – 379 C_{4} species
- Anthaenantia – 4 C_{4} species
- Arthropoginae/Mesosetum clade – 35 C_{4} species, 1–2 origins
- Arthropoginae/Onchorachis clade – 2 C_{4} species
- Arthropoginae/Colaeteania clade – 7 C_{4} species, 1–2 origins
- Anthephorinae – 286 C_{4} species
- Echinochloa – 35 C_{4} species
- Neurachne–Paraneurachne – 2 C_{4} species, 2 origins
- Melinidinae–Panicinae–Cenchrinae – 889 C_{4} species
- Alloteropsis – 5 C_{4} species, 1–2 origins (incl. C_{3} and intermediate)

== Scrophulariaceae ==
- Anticharis – 4 C_{4} species

== Zygophyllaceae ==
- Tribuloideae – 37 C_{4} species, 1–2 origins
- Tetraena simplex
