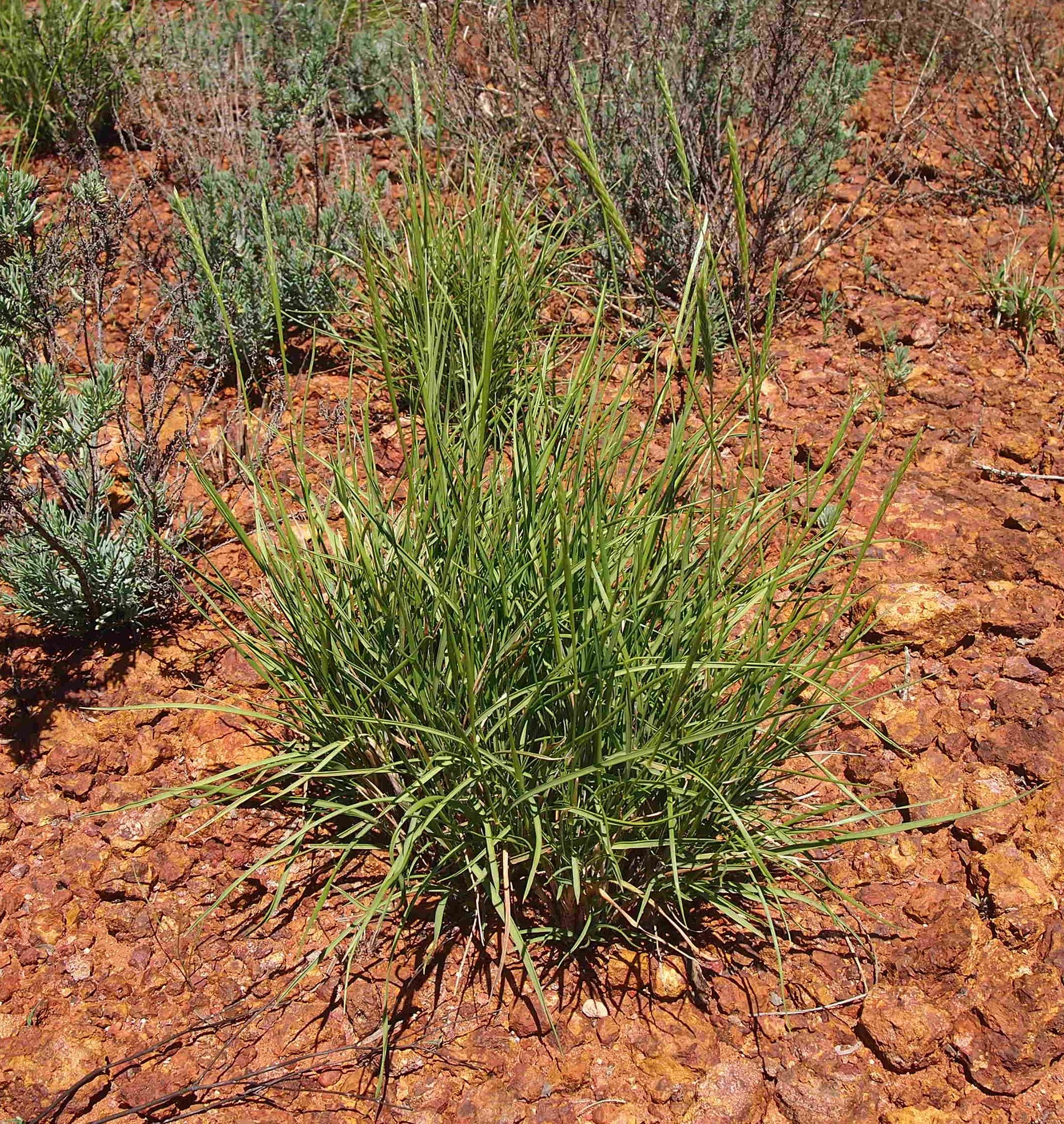
- Neurachne munroi

Scientific classification
- Kingdom: Plantae
- Clade: Tracheophytes
- Clade: Angiosperms
- Clade: Monocots
- Clade: Commelinids
- Order: Poales
- Family: Poaceae
- Subfamily: Panicoideae
- Supertribe: Panicodae
- Tribe: Paniceae
- Subtribe: Neurachninae
- Genus: Neurachne; R.Br.

Type species
- Neurachne alopecuroidea R.Br.

= Neurachne =

Mulga grass

Genus of Australian grasses

Neurachne, commonly called mulga grass, is a genus of Australian plants in the grass family.

The 1889 book 'The Useful Native Plants of Australia’ records that Neurachne Munroi is "a very rare grass, peculiar to the back country, and only found amongst Mulga scrubs (Acacia aneura and allied species)." Found in the Interior of South Australia, Victoria, and New South Wales.

Species

- Neurachne alopecuroidea R.Br.
- Neurachne lanigera S.T.Blake
- Neurachne minor S.T.Blake
- Neurachne munroi (F.Muell.) F.Muell.
- Neurachne queenslandica S.T.Blake
- Neurachne tenuifolia S.T.Blake

formerly included

see Isachne Panicum Paraneurachne Sacciolepis Thyridolepis Zygochloa

- Neurachne clementii - Paraneurachne muelleri
- Neurachne meneritana - Isachne polygonoides
- Neurachne mitchelliana - Thyridolepis mitchelliana
- Neurachne montana - Panicum torridum
- Neurachne muelleri - Paraneurachne muelleri
- Neurachne multiculmis - Thyridolepis multiculmis
- Neurachne paradoxa - Zygochloa paradoxa
- Neurachne peekelii - Sacciolepis indica
- Neurachne torrida - Panicum torridum
- Neurachne xerophila - Thyridolepis xerophila
