= C. pentaphylla =

C. pentaphylla may refer to:

- Canna pentaphylla, a garden plant
- Cleome pentaphylla, an annual wildflower
- Crotalaria pentaphylla, an invasive plant
