= Ivar Tidestrom =

Swedish-American botanist

Ivar Frederick Tidestrom (November 13, 1864 – August 2, 1956) was a Swedish-American botanist. He is best known for his volumes on the flora of the American Southwest.

== Early life ==
Tidestrom was born on his father's estate "Lanna" in Hidinge parish in Närke, near modern Vintrosa, the third of five children of Constantin Tideström (1830-1893) and his wife Brita Ulrika Wallmo (1835-1921). His father operated a lime kiln and a stone quarry on the property. Tidestrom's early schooling was in nearby Örebro. In 1880 or 1881 he ran away to America, landing in New York where his luggage was stolen. Tidestrom enlisted in the United States 8th Cavalry, serving until a hip injury forced him out in 1884, and then again from 1887 to 1891 in the United States 4th Cavalry.

== Career in science ==
In 1891 Tidestrom went to the University of California, Berkeley intending to study engineering, but after becoming an assistant to botany professor Edward Lee Greene he switched to botany. When Greene moved to the Catholic University of America in 1895, Tidestrom went with him and in 1897 earned the first PhB given out by the university, in botany.

Tidestrom entered the military once more with the onset of the Spanish-American War in 1898, taking part in the Battle of San Juan Hill (not as part of the Rough Riders, although Tidestrom admired Theodore Roosevelt greatly).

By 1903 Tidestrom was out of the military and had a job at the Bureau of Plant Industry under botanist Frederick Vernon Coville.

From 1906 to 1910 Tidestrom self-published Elysium Marianum, an attempt at a flora of Maryland.

Starting in 1915, Tidestrom became an assistant to Edward Lee Greene at the Forest Service, who was identifying species collected by rangers; after Greene's death later that year, he took over the job.

In 1925 he published his best-known work, Flora of Utah and Nevada. In 1934 Tidestrom retired from government service and shortly afterwards accepted a position at the Catholic University of America, retiring from there in 1939 and afterwards moving to Florida. With his student Sister Mary Teresita Kittell he published Flora of Arizona and New Mexico in 1941.

Tidestrom continued to collect specimens, his last major trip being a trip to Sweden in 1954 at the age of 90 for a family reunion, on which he collected about 300 plants with the aid of a Swedish niece to add to the 14,000 sheets which he had already added to the Smithsonian collections.

== Personal life ==
Tidestrom was married twice; his first marriage ended unhappily when his wife left him for another man. His second marriage, to French widow Marie Demarest (1887-1944), was happier.

Tidestrom enjoyed playing the piano and published several of his own compositions. He was an accomplished linguist who spoke Swedish, English, French, Spanish, and German, could read Latin, Danish, and Norwegian, and studied other languages as well. He was a Francophile who read extensively in French literature; after World War I he supported a French war orphan for a number of years.

Tidestrom died in St. Augustine, Florida, on August 2, 1956. He is buried in Arlington National Cemetery.

== Legacy ==
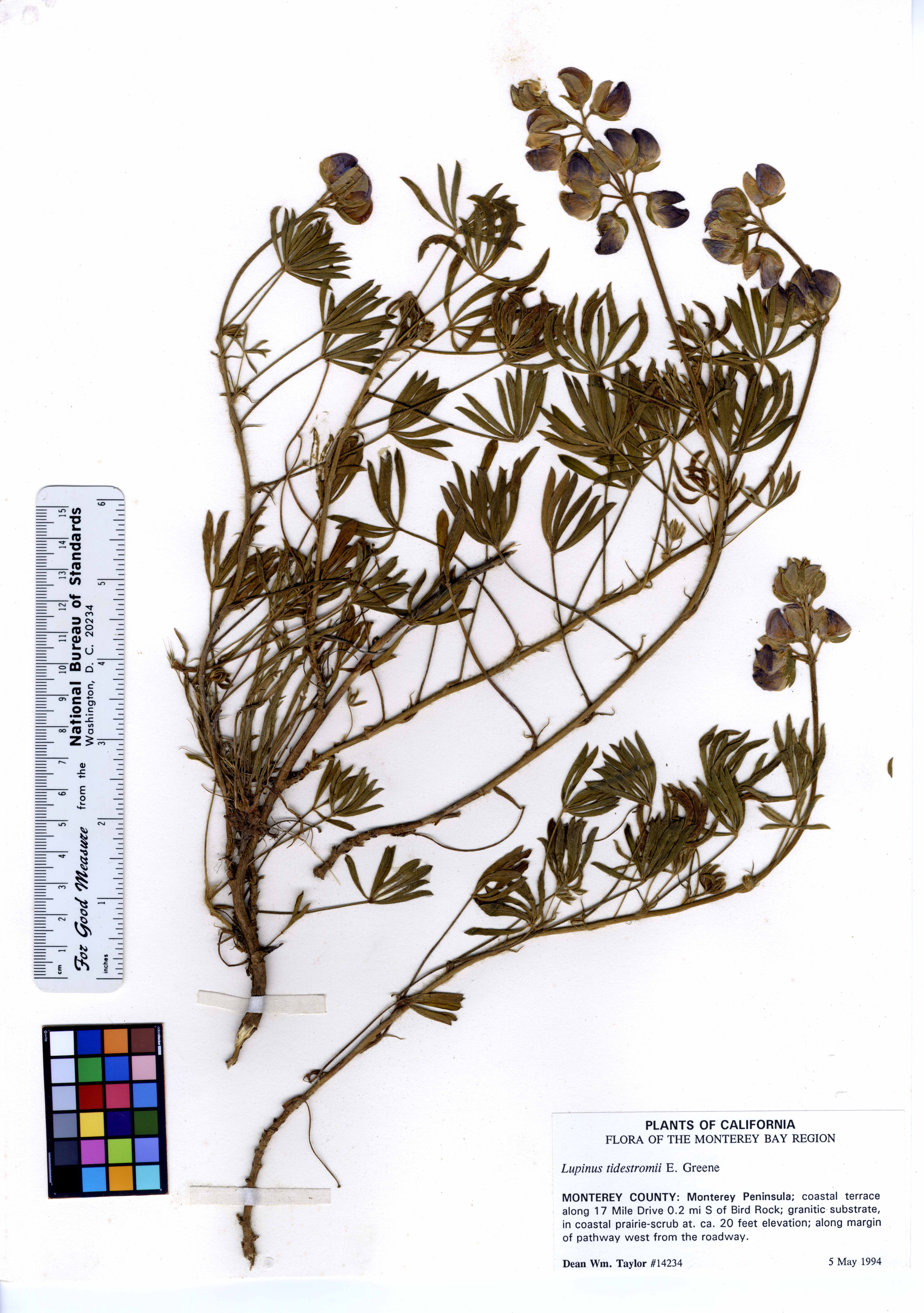
Lupinus tidestromii, one of several species named after Tidestrom

Tidestrom described as many as a hundred new species during his time identifying species for the Forest Service. The genus Tidestromia of desert and arid environment plants was named after Tidestrom by Paul Carpenter Standley.
