= Euploca humilis =

Scientific classification
- Kingdom: Plantae
- Clade: Embryophytes
- Clade: Tracheophytes
- Clade: Spermatophytes
- Clade: Angiosperms
- Clade: Eudicots
- Clade: Asterids
- Order: Boraginales
- Family: Heliotropiaceae
- Genus: Euploca
- Species: E. humilis

Binomial name
- Euploca humilis (L.) Feuillet

Synonyms
- List: Euploca ternata (Vahl) J.I.M.Melo & Semir; Heliotropium demissum Schult.; Heliotropium fruticosum var. angustilobum DC.; Heliotropium fruticosum var. confertum DC.; Heliotropium fruticosum var. hispidum (Kunth) DC.; Heliotropium fruticosum var. ternatum (Vahl) DC.; Heliotropium fumana (Fresen.) Gürke; Heliotropium greenmanii Wiggins; Heliotropium hirtum Lehm.; Heliotropium hispidum Kunth; Heliotropium humile (L.) R.Br.; Heliotropium mexicanum Greenm.; Heliotropium oaxacanum DC.; Heliotropium saxatile Brandegee; Heliotropium strictum Kunth; Heliotropium ternatum Vahl; Heliotropium ternatum var. fumana (Fresen.) I.M.Johnst.; Messerschmidia incana G.Mey.; Pioctonon antillanum Raf.; Pioctonon ternatum (Vahl) Raf.; Schleidenia fumana Fresen.; Schleidenia hispida (Kunth) Fresen.; Tournefortia humilis L.; Tournefortia incana (G.Mey.) G.Don; Tournefortia meyeri A.DC.; Tournefortia monostachya Willd. ex Roem. & Schult.; Tournefortia sessilifolia Poir.

Species of flowering plant

Euploca humilis (syn. Tournefortia humilis), the dwarf tournefortia, is a species of flowering plant in the family Heliotropiaceae. It is native to Mexico, Central America, the Caribbean, Colombia, Venezuela, Guyana, and most of Brazil. Originally described by Linnaeus in 1753, molecular and morphological evidence led to its transfer from Tournefortia to Euploca in 2016.
