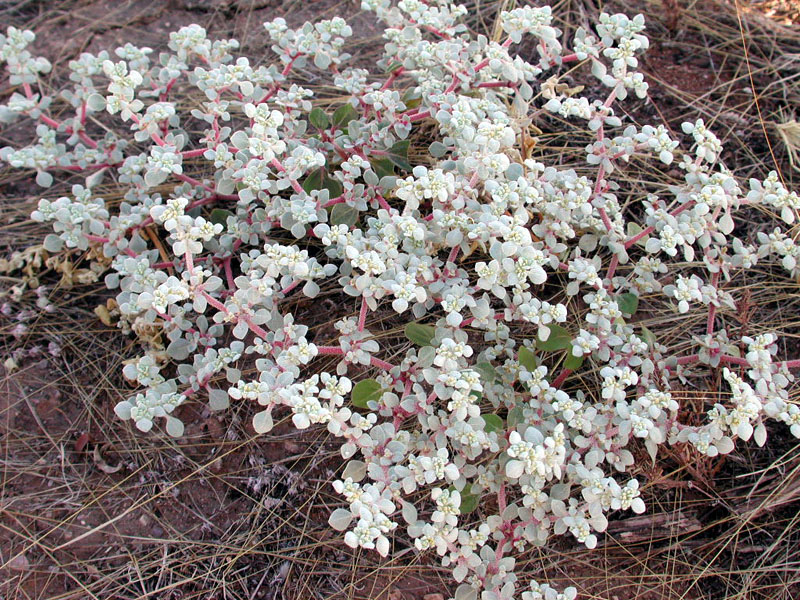
- T. lanuginosa photographed in Arizona

Conservation status
- Secure (NatureServe)

Scientific classification
- Kingdom: Plantae
- Clade: Tracheophytes
- Clade: Angiosperms
- Clade: Eudicots
- Order: Caryophyllales
- Family: Amaranthaceae
- Genus: Tidestromia
- Species: T. lanuginosa

Binomial name
- Tidestromia lanuginosa (Nutt.) Standl.

Synonyms
- Achyranthes lanuginosa Nutt.; Alternanthera lanuginosa (Nutt.) Moq.; Cladothrix lanuginosa (Nutt.) Nutt. ex S.Watson

= Tidestromia lanuginosa =

Species of flowering plant

Tidestromia lanuginosa, commonly known as woolly tidestromia, woolly honeysweet, honeysweet, or honeymat in English and as hierba lanuda, hierba ceniza, or espanta vaqueras in Spanish, is a species of plant in the family Amaranthaceae. It is a low growing annual found in the United States, Mexico, and the Dominican Republic.

== Distribution and habitat ==
T. lanuginosa is native to the western and central United States (including the states of Arizona, California, Colorado, Illinois, Kansas, Louisiana, Missouri, New Mexico, Oklahoma, Texas, and Utah), northern Mexico (including the states of Baja California, Chihuahua, Coahuila, Durango, Nuevo León, San Luis Potosí, Sinaloa, Sonora, Tamaulipas, Zacatecas), and the Dominican Republic. It occurs in a wide range of habitats, including riparian forests, pinyon–juniper woodland, desert scrub, grasslands, coastal dunes, beaches, roadsides, and fields.

== Description ==
It is an annual herb producing a sprawling red, yellow, or greenish stem up to 50 centimeters long, or occasionally longer, to form clumps or patches on the ground. The leaves are quite variable in shape, being rounded to lance-shaped and sometimes asymmetrical. They are gray-green in color due to a thin to dense layer of hairs. The hairs gradually wear off on the upper surface revealing the green below. Stems are red and are also covered with white hairs. Flowers occur in the leaf axils in clusters of a few, or solitary. The flower lacks petals but has tiny sepals around a ring of five stamens. The plant blooms from July to October.
