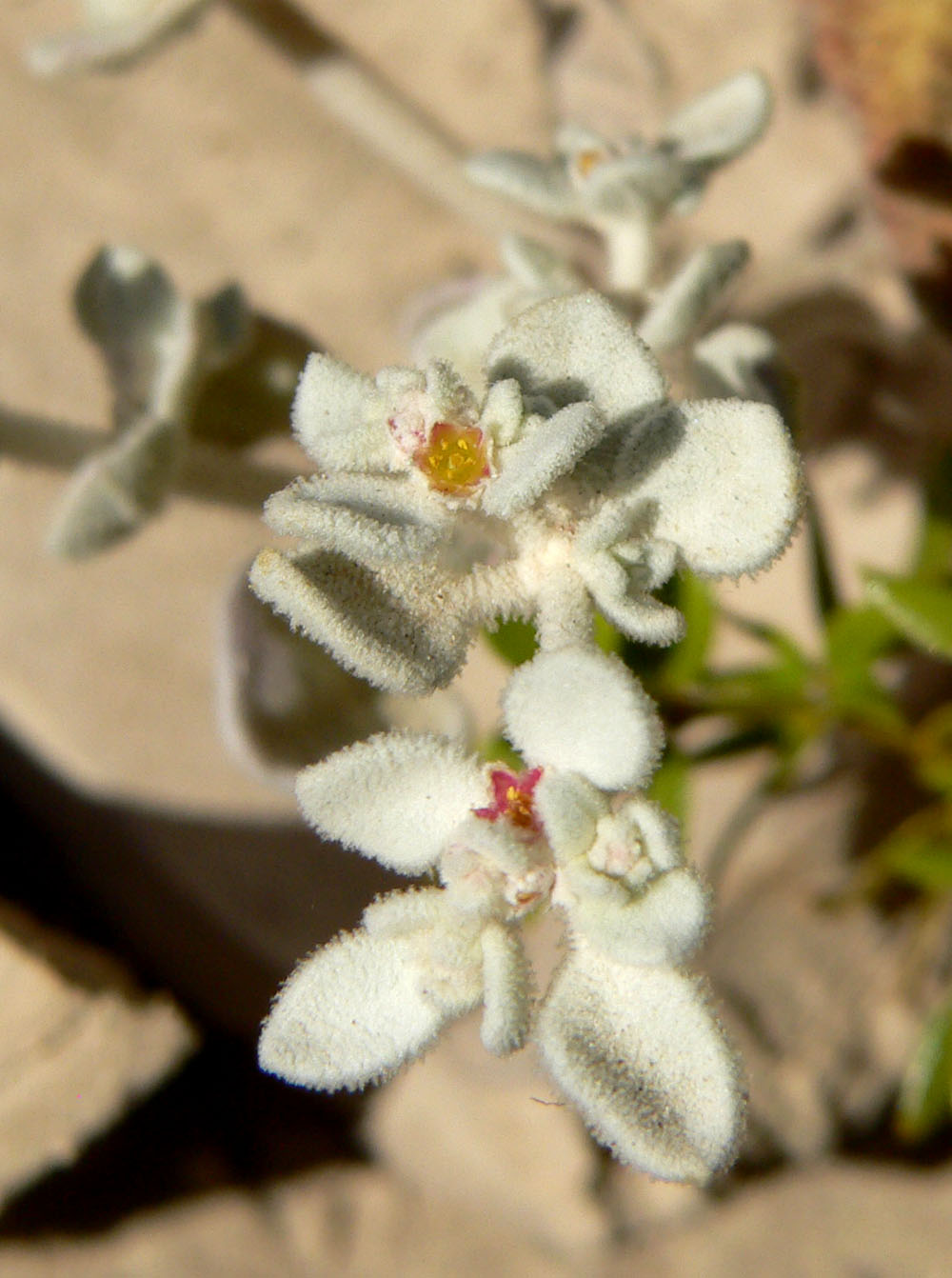
- Flowers

Scientific classification
- Kingdom: Plantae
- Clade: Tracheophytes
- Clade: Angiosperms
- Clade: Eudicots
- Order: Caryophyllales
- Family: Amaranthaceae
- Genus: Tidestromia
- Species: T. suffruticosa

Binomial name
- Tidestromia suffruticosa (Torr.) Standl.

Synonyms
- Alternanthera suffruticosa Torr.; Cladothrix oblongifolia S.Watson; Cladothrix suffruticosa (Torr.) Benth. & Hook.f. ex S.Watson; Tidestromia gemmata I.M.Johnst.; Tidestromia oblongifolia (S.Watson) Standl.; Tidestromia suffruticosa var. coahuilana I.M.Johnst.

= Tidestromia suffruticosa =

Species of shrub

Tidestromia suffruticosa, the shrubby honeysweet, is a perennial plant in the family Amaranthaceae of the southwestern United States and northeastern Mexican deserts. It has one of the highest rates of photosynthesis ever recorded. It flowers from April to December. It can survive very high temperatures, growing successfully in extreme environments such as Death Valley, and the genetic basis for this is being studied with a view to making hardier crop plants to better cope with climate change.

== Subtaxa ==
The following varieties are accepted:

- Tidestromia suffruticosa var. oblongifolia (S.Watson) Sánch.Pino & Flores Olv.
- Tidestromia suffruticosa var. suffruticosa
