= Euploca nigricans =

Conservation status
- Vulnerable (IUCN 3.1)

Scientific classification
- Kingdom: Plantae
- Clade: Tracheophytes
- Clade: Angiosperms
- Clade: Eudicots
- Clade: Asterids
- Order: Boraginales
- Family: Heliotropiaceae
- Genus: Euploca
- Species: E. nigricans

Binomial name
- Euploca nigricans (Balf.f.) M.W.Frohl., M.W.Chase & Thulin (2020)

Synonyms
- Heliotropium nigricans Balf.f. (1883)

Species of flowering plant in the borage family

Euploca nigricans is a species of flowering plant in the family Heliotropiaceae. It is a shrub endemic to south-central and southwestern Socotra island in Yemen. It is locally abundant on the southern limestone plateau in Dracaena cinnabari woodland (Firmihin) and semi-deciduous woodland (Qatariyah) from 400 to 600 metres (1,300 to 2,000 ft) elevation.
