= Mary Teresita Kittell =

American botanist and educator

Sister Mary Teresita Kittell (born De Pere, Wisconsin, November 10, 1892; died Manitowoc, Wisconsin, June 18, 1990) was an American botanist and educator.

== Early life ==
Kittell was born Mildred Kittell in West De Pere, newly consolidated with the city of De Pere across the Fox River. Her parents were railroad man William Orin Kittell (1859-1938) and Elizabeth Louise (Jacobs) Kittell (1863-1939). Her siblings were Raymond Kittell (1891-1932) and Kathryn Margaret Kittell (1901-1984).

She graduated from East High School in Green Bay, Wisconsin in 1910. In 1918 she entered the convent of the Franciscan Sisters of Christian Charity in Manitowoc and entered vows in 1920.

She earned a B.A. from the Catholic Sisters' College (the women's division of the Catholic University of America) in Washington, DC and an MA and PhD in botany (1941) from Catholic University of America, where she studied with botanist Ivar Tidestrom (1865-1956).

== Career ==
Kittell and Tidestrom published A Flora of Arizona and New Mexico in 1941, the first state-level systematic look at the area's flora.

Kittell spent nineteen years teaching in various elementary and secondary schools in Wisconsin, Michigan, Ohio and Nebraska, after receiving her PhD she spent twenty-nine years as a biology professor at Holy Family College in Manitowoc. She also spent a year as a guest professor at another Catholic institution, Chaminade College in Honolulu, Hawaii.

During her time at Holy Family College, Kittell published a guide to the ferns of the area (Ferns of Manitowoc County, 1965) and collected many specimens for the college's herbarium. After the closing of the college in 2020 the herbarium was acquired by the local Woodland Dunes Nature Center.

== Retirement ==
Kittell retired in 1971, before Holy Family was separated from her order and became Silver Lake College. She spent her retirement researching local history and the history of her order, contributing articles to local publications and publishing Refining His Silver (1979), a history of the early years of the Franciscan Sisters in Manitowoc.
