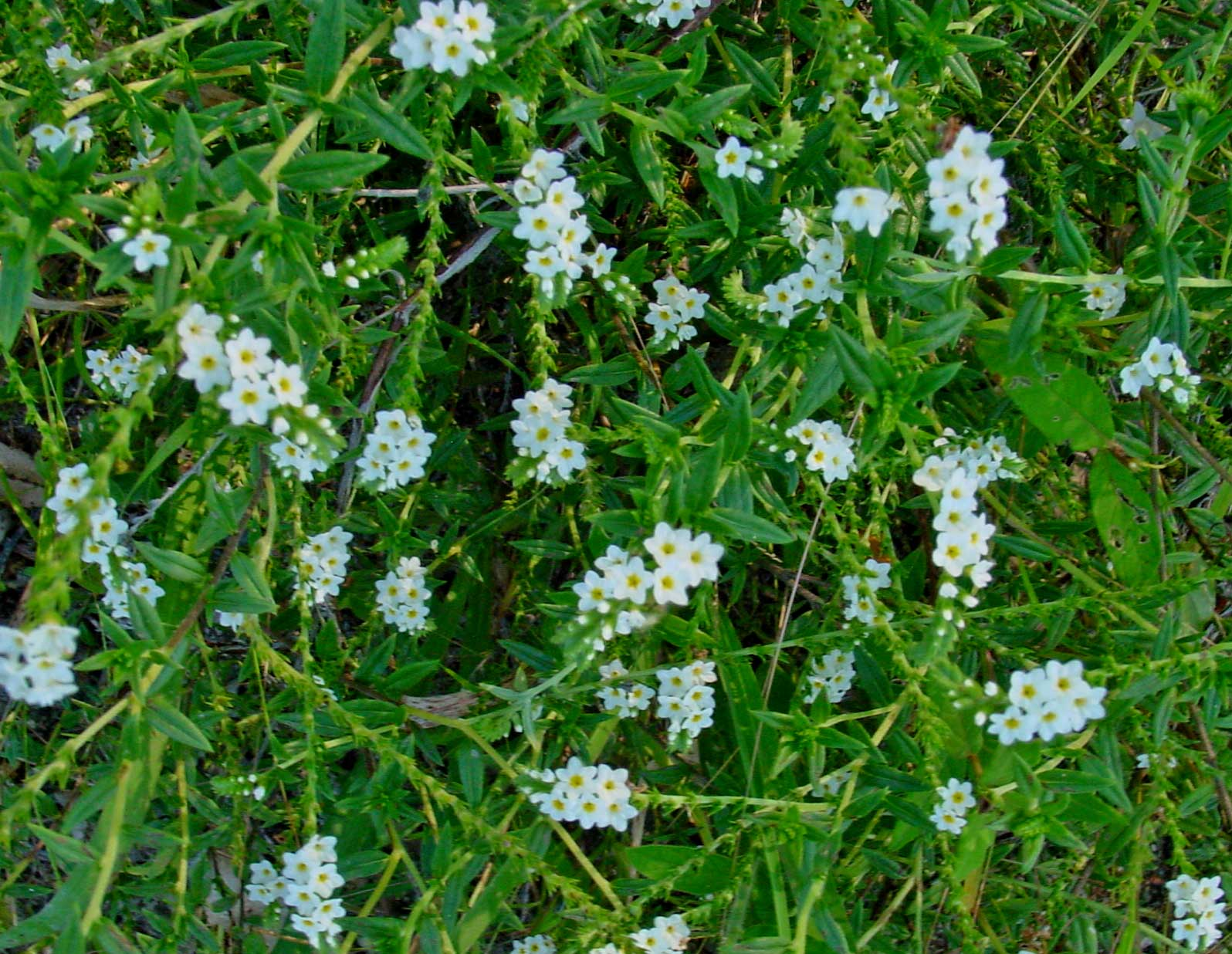
- Euploca salicoides

Scientific classification
- Kingdom: Plantae
- Clade: Embryophytes
- Clade: Tracheophytes
- Clade: Spermatophytes
- Clade: Angiosperms
- Clade: Eudicots
- Clade: Asterids
- Order: Boraginales
- Family: Heliotropiaceae
- Genus: Euploca; Nutt.

Type species
- E. convolvulacea Nutt.

Species
- 168; see text

Synonyms
- List: Hilgeria Förther; Heliotropium L. sect. Euploca Nutt. (A.Gray); Heliotropium L. sect. Orthostachys R.Br.; Orthostachys (R.Br.) Spach; Pentacarya DC. ex Meisn.; Pioctonon Raf.; Preslaea Mart.; Schleidenia Endl.

= Euploca =

Genus of flowering plants in the borage family

Euploca is an almost cosmopolitan genus of plants with 168 species.

== Description ==
While many species use the C_{4} photosynthetic pathway, there are also C_{3}–C_{4} intermediate species. Some species have leaves with a C_{4}-typical Kranz anatomy.

== Taxonomy ==
The genus was first described by Thomas Nuttall in 1837. While part of the broadly defined Boraginaceae in the APG IV system from 2016, a revision of the order Boraginales from the same year includes Euploca in the separate family Heliotropiaceae.

Its species used to be classified in the genera Hilgeria and Schleidenia and in Heliotropium sect. Orthostachys, but were found to form an independent lineage in a molecular phylogenetic analysis, more closely related to Myriopus than to Heliotropium.

=== Species ===
168 species are accepted.

- Euploca aequorea (Craven) M.W.Frohl. & M.W.Chase
- Euploca albrechtii (Craven) M.W.Frohl. & M.W.Chase
- Euploca alcyonia (Craven) M.W.Frohl. & M.W.Chase
- Euploca amnis-edith (Craven) M.W.Frohl. & M.W.Chase
- Euploca antillana (Urb.) Diane & Hilger
- Euploca apertum (Craven) M.W.Frohl. & M.W.Chase
- Euploca applanata (Thulin & Verdc.) Thulin
- Euploca arenitensis (Craven) M.W.Frohl. & M.W.Chase
- Euploca argyrea (Craven) M.W.Frohl. & M.W.Chase
- Euploca asperrima (Andersson) J.I.M.Melo
- Euploca aurata (Phil.) M.W.Frohl.
- Euploca axillaris (Greenm.) J.I.M.Melo
- Euploca baclei (DC.) Diane & Hilger
- Euploca ballii (Domin) Diane & Hilger
- Euploca barbata (DC.) J.I.M.Melo & Semir
- Euploca brachygyne (Benth.) M.W.Frohl. & M.W.Chase
- Euploca brachythrix (Craven) M.W.Frohl. & M.W.Chase
- Euploca bracteata (R.Br.) M.W.Frohl. & M.W.Chase
- Euploca bullockii (Verdc.) E.L.A.N.Simons & Wieringa
- Euploca bursifera (C.Wright ex Griseb.) Diane & Hilger
- Euploca calvariavis (Craven) M.W.Frohl. & M.W.Chase
- Euploca campestris (Griseb.) Diane & Hilger
- Euploca catamarcensis (I.M.Johnst.) M.W.Frohl.
- Euploca cerroleonensis (R.Degen) R.Degen
- Euploca chalcedonia (Craven) M.W.Frohl. & M.W.Chase
- Euploca chrysantha (Phil.) Diane & Hilger
- Euploca chrysocarpa (Craven) M.W.Frohl. & M.W.Chase
- Euploca collina (Craven) M.W.Frohl. & M.W.Chase
- Euploca confertifolia (Torr.) Feuillet & Halse
- Euploca conocarpa (F.Muell. ex Benth.) M.W.Frohl. & M.W.Chase
- Euploca consimilis (Craven) M.W.Frohl. & M.W.Chase
- Euploca convolvulacea Nutt. – sweet-scented heliotrope, showy heliotrope
- Euploca cornuta (I.M.Johnst.) Ancy & P.Javad
- Euploca cracens (Craven) M.W.Frohl. & M.W.Chase
- Euploca cremnogena (I.M.Johnst.) J.I.M.Melo
- Euploca cunninghamii (Benth.) M.W.Frohl. & M.W.Chase
- Euploca cupressina (Craven) Diane & Hilger
- Euploca decorticans M.J.Silva & J.I.M.Melo
- Euploca delestangii (Craven) M.W.Frohl. & M.W.Chase
- Euploca dichotoma (Craven) M.W.Frohl. & M.W.Chase
- Euploca dichroa (Urb.) M.W.Frohl. & M.W.Chase
- Euploca diffusa (Britton) M.W.Frohl. & M.W.Chase
- Euploca discordis (Craven) M.W.Frohl. & M.W.Chase
- Euploca distantiflora (I.M.Johnst.) J.I.M.Melo & R.Degen
- Euploca diversifolia (F.Muell. ex Benth.) M.W.Frohl. & M.W.Chase
- Euploca dunaensis (R.Degen) R.Degen
- Euploca eggersii (Urb.) M.W.Frohl. & M.W.Chase
- Euploca epacridea (F.Muell. ex Benth.) M.W.Frohl. & M.W.Chase
- Euploca euodes (Craven) M.W.Frohl. & M.W.Chase
- Euploca fallax (I.M.Johnst.) J.I.M.Melo
- Euploca fasciculata (R.Br.) M.W.Frohl. & M.W.Chase
- Euploca ferreyrae (I.M.Johnst.) M.W.Frohl. & M.W.Chase
- Euploca filaginoides (Benth.) M.W.Frohl. & M.W.Chase
- Euploca filiformis (Lehm.) J.I.M.Melo & Semir
- Euploca flintii (F.Muell. ex A.S.Mitch.) M.W.Frohl. & M.W.Chase
- Euploca foliata (R.Br.) Feuillet
- Euploca foliosissima (J.F.Macbr.) J.I.M.Melo
- Euploca foveolata (Craven) M.W.Frohl. & M.W.Chase
- Euploca frohlichii (Craven) M.W.Chase
- Euploca fruticosa (L.) J.I.M.Melo & Semir
- Euploca galioides (Craven) M.W.Frohl. & M.W.Chase
- Euploca geocharis (Domin) M.W.Frohl. & M.W.Chase
- Euploca glabella (R.Br.) M.W.Frohl. & M.W.Chase
- Euploca glandulifera (Craven) M.W.Frohl. & M.W.Chase
- Euploca greggii (Torr.) Halse & Feuillet
- Euploca haesum (Craven) M.W.Frohl. & M.W.Chase
- Euploca haitiensis (Urb.) M.W.Frohl. & M.W.Chase
- Euploca heterantha (F.Muell.) M.W.Frohl. & M.W.Chase
- Euploca hintonii (I.M.Johnst.) M.W.Frohl. & M.W.Chase
- Euploca humifusa (Kunth) Diane & Hilger
- Euploca humilis (L.) Feuillet
- Euploca humistrata (Cham.) J.I.M.Melo & Semir
- Euploca hypogaea (Urb. & Ekman) Diane & Hilger
- Euploca inexplicita (Craven) M.W.Frohl. & M.W.Chase
- Euploca karwinskyi (I.M.Johnst.) J.I.M.Melo
- Euploca katangensis (Gürke) E.L.A.N.Simons & Wieringa
- Euploca krapovickasii J.I.M.Melo & Semir
- Euploca lagoensis (Warm.) Diane & Hilger
- Euploca lapidicola (Craven) M.W.Frohl. & M.W.Chase
- Euploca laxa (Thulin) Thulin
- Euploca leptalea (Craven) M.W.Frohl. & M.W.Chase
- Euploca limbata (Benth.) J.I.M.Melo
- Euploca lobbii (I.M.Johnst.) J.I.M.Melo
- Euploca madagascariensis (Vatke) E.L.A.N.Simons & Wieringa
- Euploca madurensis (Riedl) Ancy & P.Javad
- Euploca marchionica (Decne.) J.I.M.Melo
- Euploca margaritensis (Hassl. ex I.M.Johnst.) J.I.M.Melo & R.Degen
- Euploca marifolia (J.Koenig ex Retz.) Ancy & P.Javad
- Euploca melanopedii (Craven) M.W.Frohl. & M.W.Chase
- Euploca mendocina (Phil.) Diane & Hilger
- Euploca mexicana (A.DC.) M.W.Frohl. & M.W.Chase
- Euploca michoacana (I.M.Johnst.) J.I.M.Melo
- Euploca microphylla (Sw. ex Wikstr.) Feuillet
- Euploca microsalsoloides (Craven) M.W.Frohl. & M.W.Chase
- Euploca mitchellii (Craven) M.W.Frohl. & M.W.Chase
- Euploca moorei (Craven) M.W.Frohl. & M.W.Chase
- Euploca mutica (Domin) M.W.Frohl. & M.W.Chase
- Euploca myriophylla (Urb.) M.W.Frohl. & M.W.Chase
- Euploca nana (Northr.) M.W.Frohl. & M.W.Chase
- Euploca nashii (Millsp.) M.W.Frohl. & M.W.Chase
- Euploca nesopelyda (Craven) M.W.Frohl. & M.W.Chase
- Euploca nexosa (Craven) M.W.Frohl. & M.W.Chase
- Euploca nigricans (Balf.f.) M.W.Frohl., M.W.Chase & Thulin
- Euploca ocellata (Cham.) J.I.M.Melo & Semir
- Euploca ottonii (Lehm.) M.W.Frohl. & M.W.Chase
- Euploca ovalifolia (Forssk.) Diane & Hilger
- Euploca oxyloba (I.M.Johnst.) J.I.M.Melo
- Euploca pachyphylla (Craven) M.W.Frohl. & M.W.Chase
- Euploca pallescens (I.M.Johnst.) J.I.M.Melo & Semir
- Euploca paniculata (R.Br.) M.W.Frohl. & M.W.Chase
- Euploca paradoxa (Mart.) J.I.M.Melo & Semir
- Euploca parciflora (Mart.) J.I.M.Melo & Semir
- Euploca parviantrum (Craven) M.W.Frohl. & M.W.Chase
- Euploca pauciflora (R.Br.) M.W.Frohl. & M.W.Chase
- Euploca peckhamii (Craven) M.W.Frohl. & M.W.Chase
- Euploca pedicellaris (Urb. & Ekman) Feuillet
- Euploca peninsularis (Craven) M.W.Frohl. & M.W.Chase
- Euploca perlmanii (Lorence & W.L.Wagner) J.I.M.Melo
- Euploca perrieri (J.S.Mill.) J.S.Mill.
- Euploca personata (Thulin) Thulin
- Euploca pilosa (Ruiz & Pav.) Luebert
- Euploca piurensis (I.M.Johnst.) J.I.M.Melo
- Euploca plumosa (Craven) M.W.Frohl. & M.W.Chase
- Euploca polyanthella (I.M.Johnst.) J.I.M.Melo
- Euploca polyphylla (Lehm.) J.I.M.Melo & Semir
- Euploca pottii J.I.M.Melo & Semir
- Euploca powelliorum (B.L.Turner) Feuillet & Halse
- Euploca pringlei (B.L.Rob.) Halse & Feuillet
- Euploca procumbens (Mill.) Diane & Hilger
- Euploca prostrata (R.Br.) M.W.Frohl. & M.W.Chase
- Euploca protensa (Craven) M.W.Frohl. & M.W.Chase
- Euploca pulvina (Craven) Diane & Hilger
- Euploca purdiei (I.M.Johnst.) J.I.M.Melo & Fern.Alonso
- Euploca queretaroana (I.M.Johnst.) J.I.M.Melo
- Euploca racemosa Rose & Standl.
- Euploca ramulipatens (Craven) M.W.Frohl. & M.W.Chase
- Euploca rariflora (Stocks) Diane & Hilger
- Euploca rhadinostachya (Craven) M.W.Frohl. & M.W.Chase
- Euploca riochiquensis J.R.I.Wood & P.Muñoz
- Euploca rodaliae J.I.M.Melo & Semir
- Euploca salicoides (Cham.) J.I.M.Melo & Semir
- Euploca serpylloides (Griseb.) Diane & Hilger
- Euploca sessei (I.M.Johnst.) J.I.M.Melo
- Euploca sessilistigma (Hutch. & E.A.Bruce) E.L.A.N.Simons & Wieringa
- Euploca skeleton (Craven) M.W.Frohl. & M.W.Chase
- Euploca sphaerica (Craven) M.W.Frohl. & M.W.Chase
- Euploca strigosa (Willd.) Diane & Hilger
- Euploca styotricha (Craven) Diane & Hilger
- Euploca subreniformis (Craven) M.W.Frohl. & M.W.Chase
- Euploca synaimon (Craven) M.W.Frohl. & M.W.Chase
- Euploca tabuliplagae (Craven) M.W.Frohl. & M.W.Chase
- Euploca tachyglossoides (Craven) M.W.Frohl. & M.W.Chase
- Euploca tanythrix (Craven) M.W.Frohl. & M.W.Chase
- Euploca tenella (Torr.) Feuillet & Halse
- Euploca tenuifolia (R.Br.) Diane & Hilger
- Euploca texana (I.M.Johnst.) M.W.Frohl. & M.W.Chase
- Euploca toratensis (I.M.Johnst.) J.I.M.Melo
- Euploca torreyi (I.M.Johnst.) Halse & Feuillet
- Euploca transformis (Craven) M.W.Frohl. & M.W.Chase
- Euploca tytoides (Craven) M.W.Frohl. & M.W.Chase
- Euploca uniflora (Craven) M.W.Frohl. & M.W.Chase
- Euploca uninervis (Urb.) M.W.Frohl. & M.W.Chase
- Euploca vaga (Craven) M.W.Frohl. & M.W.Chase
- Euploca ventricosa (R.Br.) M.W.Frohl. & M.W.Chase
- Euploca vestita (Benth.) M.W.Frohl. & M.W.Chase
- Euploca viator (Craven) M.W.Frohl. & M.W.Chase
- Euploca wigginsii (I.M.Johnst.) J.I.M.Melo

== Distribution and habitat ==
The genus has an almost cosmopolitan distribution.
