= Amalakwang =

Ugandan traditional dish

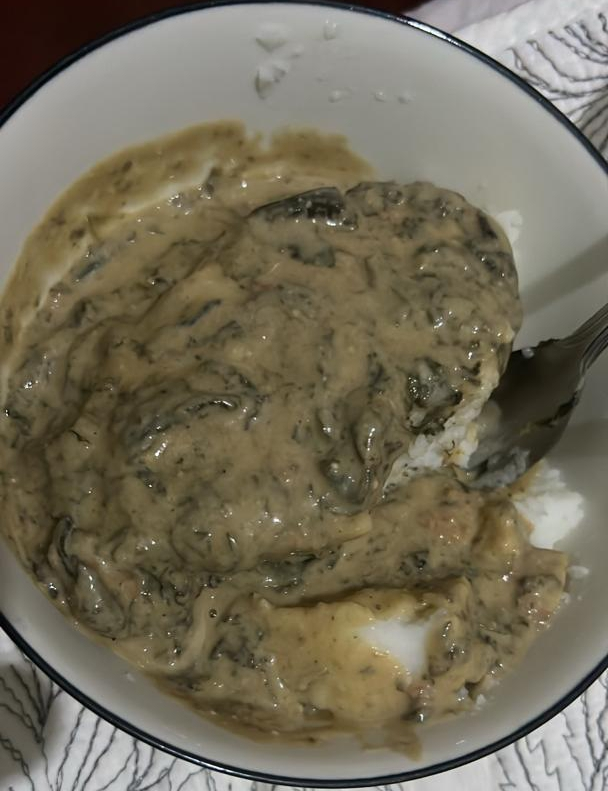
- A bowl of amalakwang.
- Place of origin: Uganda

Amalakwang or Malakwang is a vegetable found in Northern Uganda. It is a type of roselle (Hibiscus sabdariffa) that has multiple preparations. One recipe boils it, combines it with groundnut paste, and serves it with sweet potatoes, posho and rice. Amalakwang is also prepared or mixed with fish and beans, mainly by the Alur of Uganda. The vegetable is also dried and preserved for a longer period of time. It is also used for medicinal purposes.

It is also found in the Ugandan regions of West Nile, Eastern Uganda and Karamoja.

== See also ==
Lugbara Cuisines
