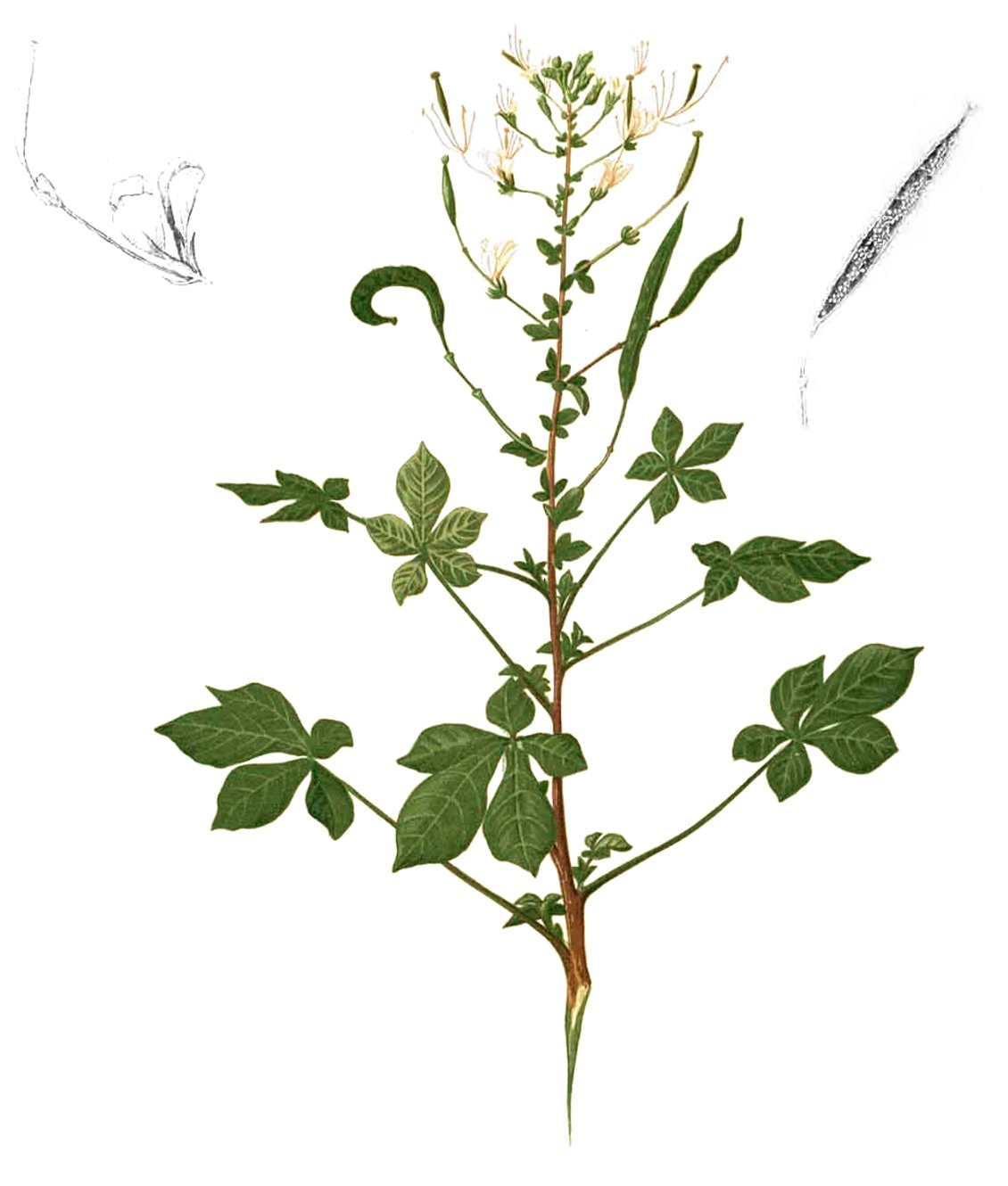

Scientific classification
- Kingdom: Plantae
- Clade: Tracheophytes
- Clade: Angiosperms
- Clade: Eudicots
- Clade: Rosids
- Order: Brassicales
- Family: Cleomaceae
- Genus: Cleome
- Species: C. gynandra

Binomial name
- Cleome gynandra L.
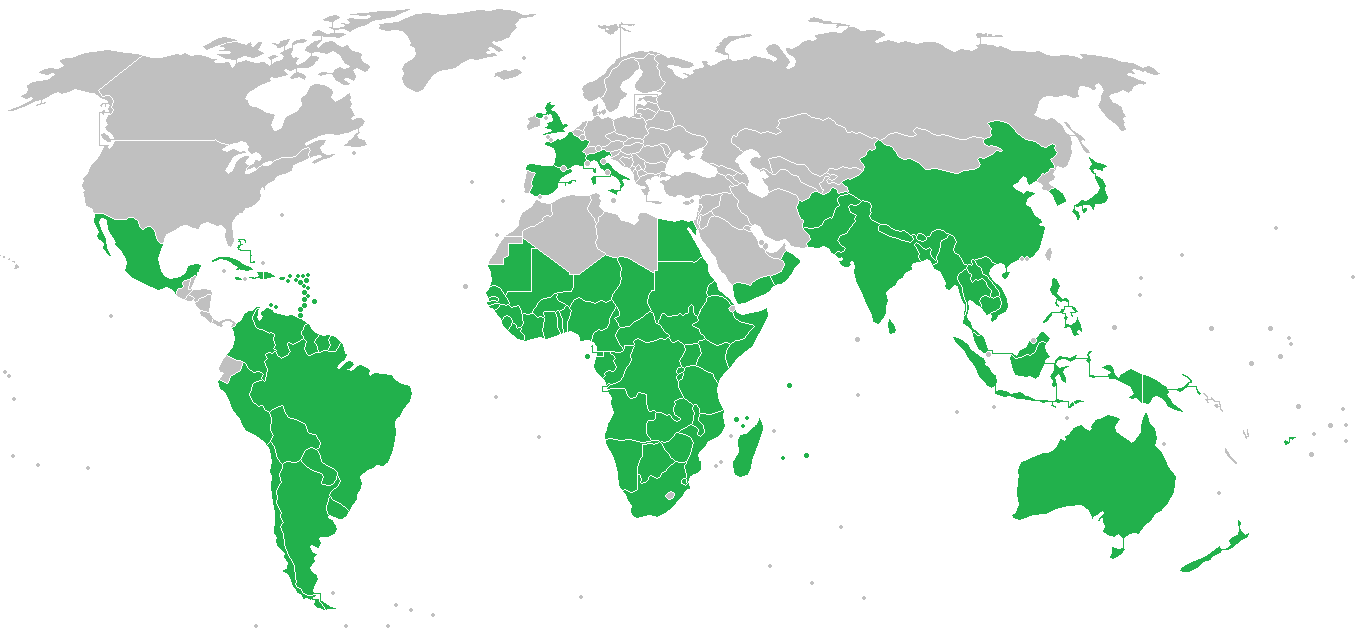
- world range

Synonyms
- List: Cleome acuta Schumach. & Thonn.; Cleome affinis (Blume) Spreng. nom. illeg.; Cleome alliacea Blanco; Cleome alliodora Blanco; Cleome blumeana D.Dietr.; Cleome bungei Steud.; Cleome candelabrum Sims; Cleome denticulata Schult. & Schult.f.; Cleome eckloniana Schrad.; Cleome flexuosa F.Dietr. ex Schult. & Schult.f.; Cleome heterotricha Burch.; Cleome muricata (Schrad.) Schult. & Schult.f.; Cleome oleracea Welw.; Cleome pentaphylla L.; Cleome pubescens Sieber ex Steud.; Cleome rosea Eckl. ex Steud. nom. inval.; Cleome triphylla L.; Gymnogonia pentaphylla (L.) R. Br. ex Steud.; Gynandropsis affinis Blume; Gynandropsis candelabrum (Sims) Sweet; Gynandropsis denticulata DC.; Gynandropsis glandulosa C.Presl; Gynandropsis gynandra (L.) Briq.; Gynandropsis heterotricha DC.; Gynandropsis muricata Schrad.; Gynandropsis ophitocarpa DC.; Gynandropsis palmipes DC.; Gynandropsis pentaphylla (L.) DC.; Gynandropsis pentaphylla Blanco; Gynandropsis sinica Miq.; Gynandropsis triphylla DC.; Gynandropsis viscida Bunge; Pedicellaria pentaphylla (L.) Schrank; Pedicellaria triphylla (L.) Pax; Podogyne pentaphylla (L.) Hoffmanns.; Sinapistrum pentaphyllum (L.) Medik.

= Cleome gynandra =

Species of flowering plant

Cleome gynandra is a species of Cleome that is used as a leaf vegetable. It is known by many common names including Shona cabbage, African cabbage, spiderwisp, cat's whiskers, and stinkweed. It is an annual wildflower native to Africa but has become widespread in many tropical and sub-tropical parts of the world.

== Description ==
Cleome gynandra is an erect, branching plant generally between 25 cm and 60 cm tall. Depending on environmental conditions, it can reach up to 150 cm of height. Its sparse leaves are each made up of 3–7 oval-shaped leaflets. The flowers are white, sometimes changing to rose pink as they age. The leaves and flowers are both edible. The leaves have a strong bitter, sometimes peppery flavor similar to mustard greens.

The fruit is a dehiscent silique, a slender and spindle-shaped capsule, and measures 12 cm in length and 8–10 mm in width. During the ripening process, the color of the pods turns from green to yellow to brown when dry. In the dry state, they dehisce longitudinally and release their seeds. Each silique can contain as many as 100-150 seeds. The seeds are round, black and with a rough surface and measure 1.0-1.5 mm in diameter. Seeds of C. gynandra contain 17-19% oil.

Cleome gynandra has a long tap root with root hairs and has few secondary roots.

== Uses ==
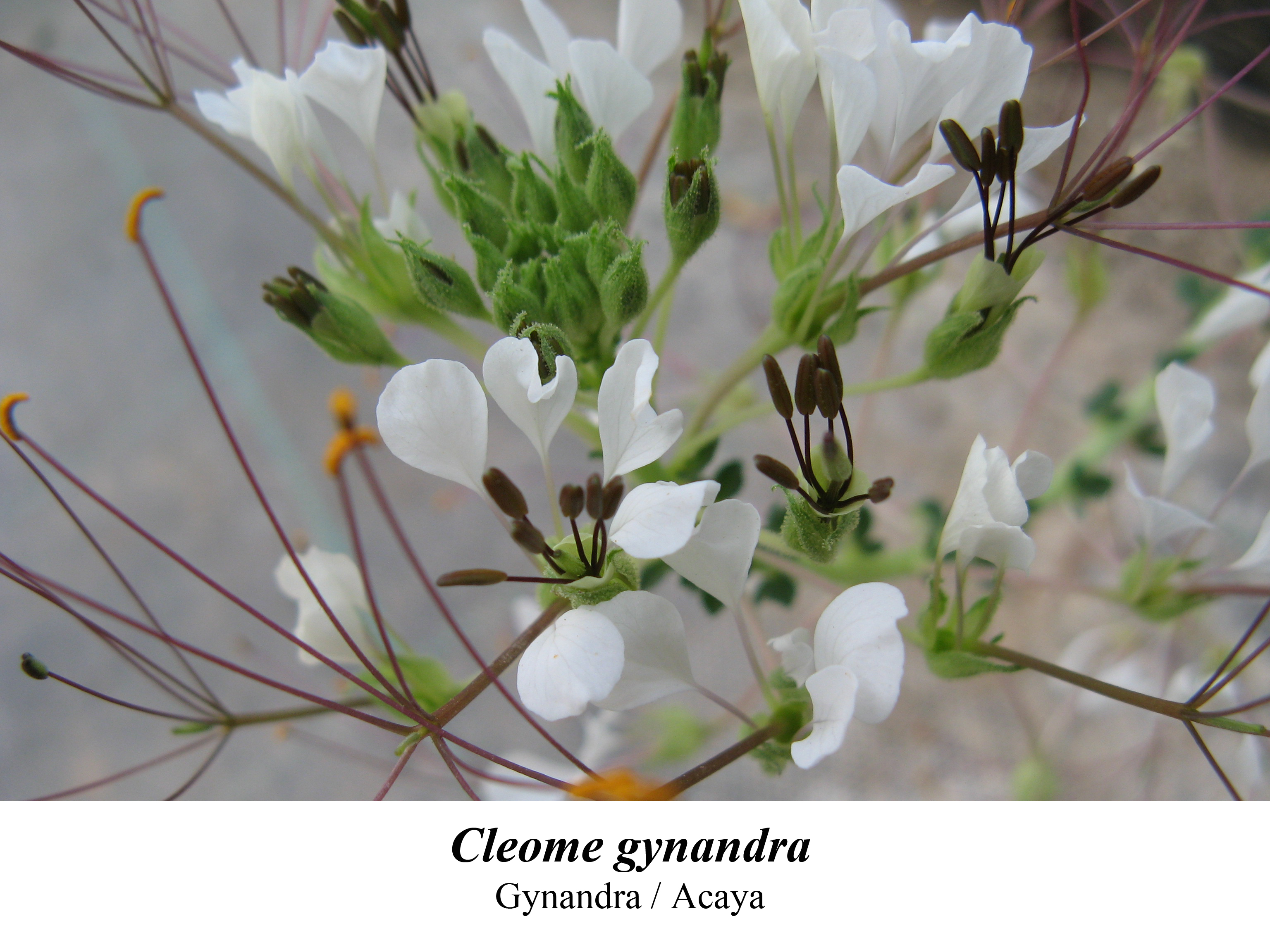

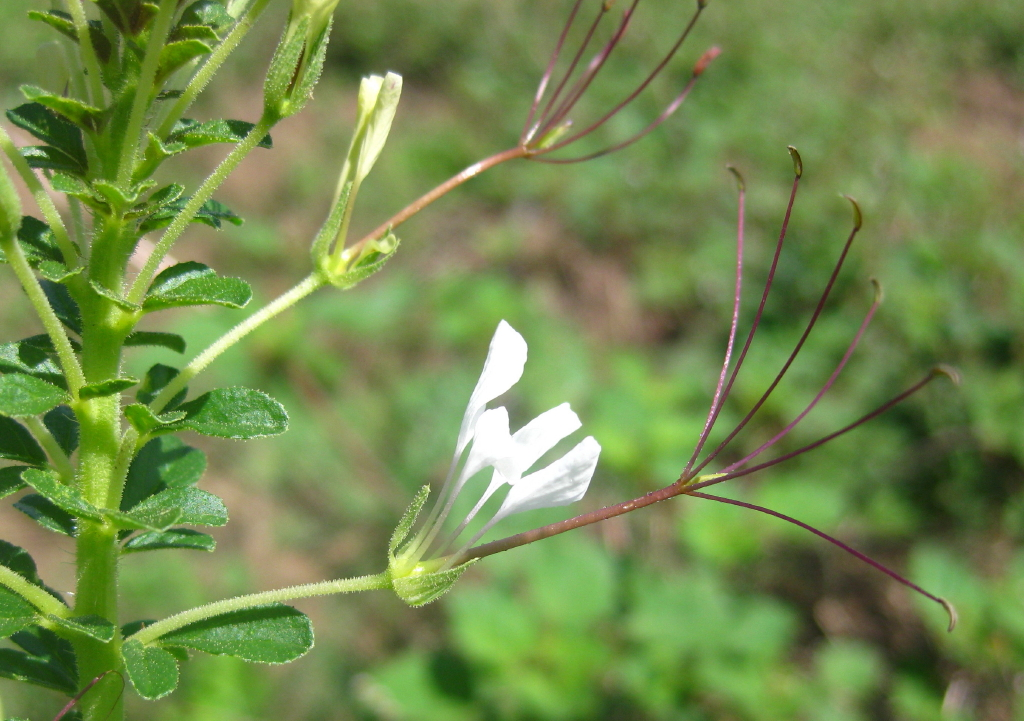
Gynandra

Typically, the leaves and shoots are eaten boiled or in stews. The leaves are often eaten in Sub-Saharan Africa, where they are often dried for storage, then cooked with milk or butter to reduce its bitter taste. In Kenya, Uganda and Tanzania, the leaves are cooked with groundnut paste.

In Northern Uganda it is known as Dek Akeo, or Akeyo. It is prepared by boiling it in hot water mixed with groundnut paste. It is served with Kalo, posho, sweet potatoes. The vegetable is sun-dried and preserved for a longer shelf-life and future medicinal consumption. The vegetable is served in local restaurants and hotels but predominantly consumed in greater Northern Uganda.

The plant is useful for intercropping due to its insect repellent and anti-tick properties. Leaves exhibit repellent, destructive and antifeedant properties to some ticks species in all their life stages (larvae, nymphs, and adults).

In Thailand and Malaysia, the leaves are a popular food item fermented with rice water as a pickle known as phak sian dong. The same pickle is also eaten in the northern states of Malaysia, and is known as jeruk maman. The state of Negeri Sembilan specializes in rendang maman, where the leaves are braised in spiced coconut milk for a long period of time to achieve the desirable crisp and texture.

The leaves also have antioxidative properties that can help with inflammatory diseases. Because of its anti-inflammatory properties, it is sometimes used as a medicinal herb. The leaves and flowers of C. gynandra have been used in traditional medicine to treat conditions including food poisoning, rheumatism, inflammation, bacterial infections, and especially pain-related conditions such as headache toothache, headache, neuralgia, stomach pain, ear-ache, rheumatoid arthritis, skeletal fractures, colic pain and chest pain. In Saudi Arabia, C. gynandra extracts are used to treat the severe pain and anti-inflammatory reactions caused by scorpion stings.

== Special compounds and nutritional value ==
Cleome gynandra is high in beta-carotene, folic acid, ascorbic acid and calcium. It also contains vitamin E, iron, and oxalic acid. Generally, the leaves are about 4.0% protein. 100 g of C. gynandra contain around 1.4 g crude fibre, 127–484 mg vitamin C and 0.76 mg zinc, 3.1-7.7 g crude protein. The contents of iron and calcium vary by zone from 1–11 mg, and 213–434 mg respectively.

The seeds of C. gynandra contain fatty acids such as palmitic acid, stearic acid, oleic acid, and linoleic acid and essential amino acids including glutamic acid, arginine, leucine, valine, glycine, and proline.

== Cultivation ==
Cleome gynandra is normally not a cultivated crop. Leaves are in most cases harvested from the plant found as naturally growing weed. However, some studies on the most suitable cultivation techniques have been conducted.

=== Soil requirements ===
Cleome gynandra requires deep, well drained fertile soils. It grows well on loose soils, with high humus content and with pH ranging from 5.5 to 7.

=== Sowing ===
In cultivation, propagation of the plant is done by seed sowing. Given the small seed size, the depth of sowing and the preparation of the seedbed are important factors. The seedbed requires shallow ploughing (around 15 cm deep), weed removal and harrowing to have a fine loose soil. Seeds can be dispersed unevenly by broadcasting or shallowly drilled in rows spaced around 30 cm apart and around 1 cm deep.

=== Weeding ===
Weeding is needed in the early stages of development, when the canopy coverage by C. gynandra leaves is still reduced. It can be done by hands or with suitable machinery, ensuring shallow cultivation.

=== Fertilization ===
Generous and frequent nitrogen based fertilizers can be applied to delay flowering, prolong vegetative growth and increase number and dimensions of the leaves. Yield increase is more significant when nitrogen is provided in its organic form, although also inorganic nitrogen fertilizers ensure an increase in yield. Recommended fertilizers application depend on soil properties but can reach up to 30 t/ha of farm yard of compost manure or up to 120 kg/ha of inorganic fertilizers.

=== Watering ===
To result in a good yield, C. gynandra needs adequate soil water content throughout the whole vegetative growing period. Frequent and controlled irrigation is desirable and must be determined depending on soil water retention properties. Over-watering can lead to yield loss due to the scarce resistance to flooding.

=== Harvesting ===
Harvesting can be done in two distinct ways. The first one consists in complete uprooting of the whole plant and successive separation of the leaves from the stem. Alternatively, multiple harvesting can be done by cutting the higher part of the plant and collecting the upper leaves. This second strategy helps to increase lateral leaves growth and to delay flowering, extending the vegetative period.

=== Yield ===
When fertilizers and water are supplied appropriately, it has been reported that cumulative foliar yield can reach up to 30 t/ha.

== Pest and disease control ==
Cleome gynandra has developed through natural selection and not man-made selection for the highest yield. This makes it particularly resistant against diseases. However, the following pests were found on the weed: pentatomids (Agonoselis nubilis), locustus (Schitocera gregaria), flea beetles (Phyllotreta mashonana), cabbage sawfly (Athalia spp.), bugs (Nezara spp. and Bagrada spp.), cotton jassids (Empoasca spp.), nematodes (Meloidogyne spp.).

Pesticide attacks are generally stronger during dry periods than during the rainy season. These can, however, be controlled by firing the correct pesticides, such as Ambush, Ripcord and Rogor. Pest and diseases can also be controlled by breeding programmes. Thanks to this method, the use of fertilizers, which are expensive and cause damage to the environment, gets reduced.

Weaver birds eating the seeds during the vegetative stage and mildew fungus can also cause problems during Cleome gynandra’s growth.

== Breeding program ==
Despite the great potential of C. gynandra, there is a lack of information, awareness, promotion and available technologies in its cultivation.Therefore, not many studies have been done on the plant yet. Research has tried to make this weed more resistant to dry weather, salt stress tolerance and the lengthening of its vegetative period, thus delaying flowering.

Moreover, since the leaves have a particularly bitter taste caused by condensed tannins, breeding programmes have also tried to change this plant trait, in order to attract more potential consumers.

Since C. gynandra is self-pollinating, inbreeding and interspecific crossing with its relatives are possible. Studies on the potential number of plant chromosomes have been carried out, although the results are not yet clearly confirmed. Genetic variability is wide and so are the possibilities to increase the biomass of the plant through cross-breeding. In areas where consumption is high, farmers have easily been able to select the most productive traits of the plant. Thus has confirmed good possibilities in its genetic improvement, especially within plants from different geographical origins.

== Socioeconomic potential ==
African Indigenous Vegetables (AIV) such as Cleome gynandra, which have no international trading record, play a crucial role in regional food security due to their suitability and adaptability to the local environment. In South Africa, C. gynandra was identified as the most income generating local vegetable, followed by crops like amaranth, black jack and wild jute. Producers with established recognition in Sub-Saharan African countries like Botswana, Malawi, South Africa, Zambia, and Zimbabwe secure contracts with supermarkets, restaurants, lodges, and hotels, which highlights the economic potential of this crop in regional agriculture.

By enhancing the methods of conducting and sharing research on C. gynandra and employing strategies like value chain development and technology transfer programs, the establishment of sustainable collaboration frameworks for industry stakeholders are fostered. This could allow innovations to spread quickly and gain popularity. Addressing the challenges and opportunities for this crop requires the active involvement of multiple sectors, including farmer organisations, researchers, seed companies, traders, policy makers and consumers. To support AIV in sub-Saharan Africa, it is essential to support efforts through breeding, value chain development and the establishment of national frameworks. Additionally, enhancing the utilization and popularity of orphan crops like C. gynandra requires diversifying products, fostering innovation, and value addition. As example, the urban younger generation showed a positive response to canned vegetable products. The strategic assumption behind is that introducing new product varieties will not only improve the acceptance of AIV but also increase consumption and demand from citizens of both the rural and urban context.

== Ecology and distribution ==
It is an annual wildflower native to Africa but has naturalized across tropic and sub-tropical regions across Africa, Asia and America. In those regions it grows at altitudes from 0 to 2400 m above sea level. It grows well in disturbed, well-drained soils, but is also drought-tolerant. It does not tolerate cold temperatures well, and is frost-tender. optimal growth conditions include temperatures between 18 °C and 25 °C, with high light intensity.

Cleome gynandra is considered an invasive weed in many places in the U.S. and elsewhere in the Pacific.

== Biochemistry ==
Cleome gynandra uses NAD-malic enzyme type C_{4} photosynthesis and has the characteristic traits associated with this, including changes in leaf biochemistry, cell biology and development. The family Cleomaceae is relatively close to Brassicaceae with Arabidopsis thaliana (a C_{3} photosynthetic plant) and therefore offers comparison with this well studied model organism. The C_{4} pathway in this species evolved independently from two other C_{4} Cleome species, C. angustifolia and C. oxalidea.

== See also ==
- List of leaf vegetables
- List of Thai ingredients
- Amalakwang
- Ugandan cuisine
- Nangnang Fish
