= Euphorbia herbstii =

Conservation status
- Critically Imperiled (NatureServe)

Scientific classification
- Kingdom: Plantae
- Clade: Tracheophytes
- Clade: Angiosperms
- Clade: Eudicots
- Clade: Rosids
- Order: Malpighiales
- Family: Euphorbiaceae
- Genus: Euphorbia
- Species: E. herbstii

Binomial name
- Euphorbia herbstii (W.L.Wagner) Oudejans

Synonyms
- Euphorbia clusiifolia Hook. & Arn. Euphorbia forbesii Sherff; Chamaesyce herbstii W.L.Wagner; Chamaesyce forbesii (Sherff) Croizat & O.Deg. Chamaesyce clusiifolia (Hook. & Arn.) Arthur; Anisophyllum nodosum Klotzsch & Garcke

Species of flowering plant

Euphorbia herbstii (syn. Chamaesyce herbstii) is a rare species of flowering plant in the family Euphorbiaceae known by the common name Herbst's sandmat. It is endemic to Oʻahu, Hawaii, where it is rapidly disappearing. Like other Hawaiian euphorbs, this plant is known locally as ʻakoko. It is a federally listed endangered species of the United States.

This plant is usually a tree which can grow up to 8 meters tall. The leaf blades are long and narrow, and the branches bleed a milky sap. The inflorescence is a cluster of cyathia.

This species is known from perhaps four populations in mesic forests on the Waiʻanae Range. Since the year 2000 the plant has undergone a severe decline, with populations extirpated and remaining ones becoming smaller. The exact number of remaining plants is unknown because each survey tallies fewer individuals, while more have been planted in appropriate habitat.

Threats to the species include feral pigs, which uproot and trample vegetation, leading to loss of plant cover and root networks, which then leads to erosion. They pick up the seeds of invasive plant species and transport them to new habitats. Fences have been erected in critical areas to exclude the pigs. Non-native plants affecting the euphorb include silky oak (Grevillea robusta), corky-stem passionflower (Passiflora suberosa), and strawberry guava (Psidium littorale).
