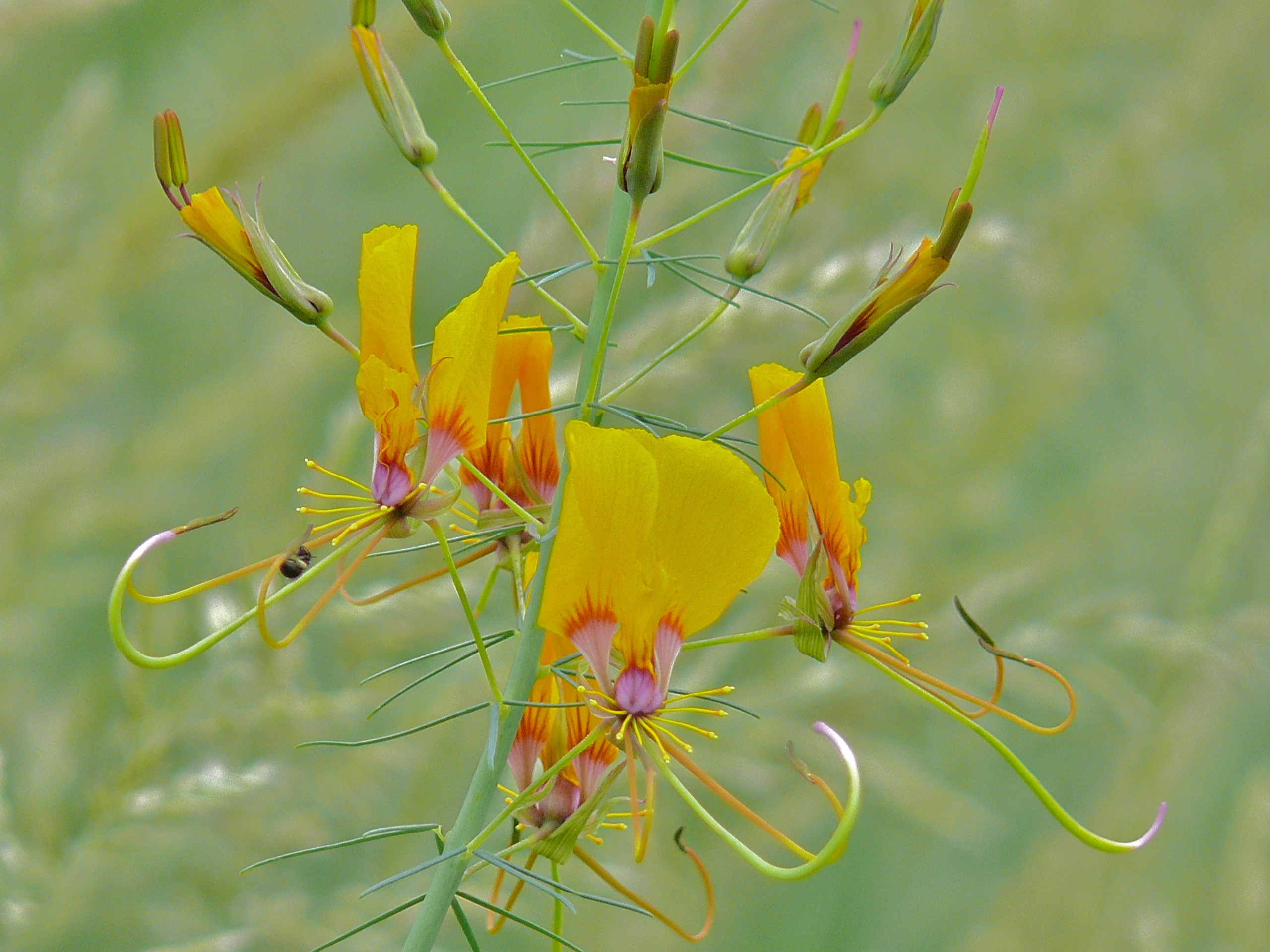

Scientific classification
- Kingdom: Plantae
- Clade: Embryophytes
- Clade: Tracheophytes
- Clade: Spermatophytes
- Clade: Angiosperms
- Clade: Eudicots
- Clade: Rosids
- Order: Brassicales
- Family: Cleomaceae
- Genus: Cleome
- Species: C. angustifolia

Binomial name
- Cleome angustifolia Forssk.

Synonyms
- Cleome didynarna Hochst. ex Oliv.; Cleome filifolia Vahl [Illegitimate]; Cleome hochstetteri (Eichler) Cufod.; Coalisia angustifolia (Forssk.) Raf.; Dianthera hochstetteri Eichler

= Cleome angustifolia =

Species of flowering plant

Cleome angustifolia, known as golden cleome, yellow cleome or yellow mouse whiskers, is an African species of plant in the Cleomaceae family. It is common along roadsides and in disturbed areas and is eaten as vegetable locally. Swedish naturalist Peter Forsskål described C. angustifolia in 1775. It is one of three species in genus Cleome (the others being C. gynandra and C. oxalidea) that independently acquired the C_{4} pathway of carbon fixation. A species close to C. angustifolia, Cleome paradoxa, is C_{3}–C_{4} intermediate.
