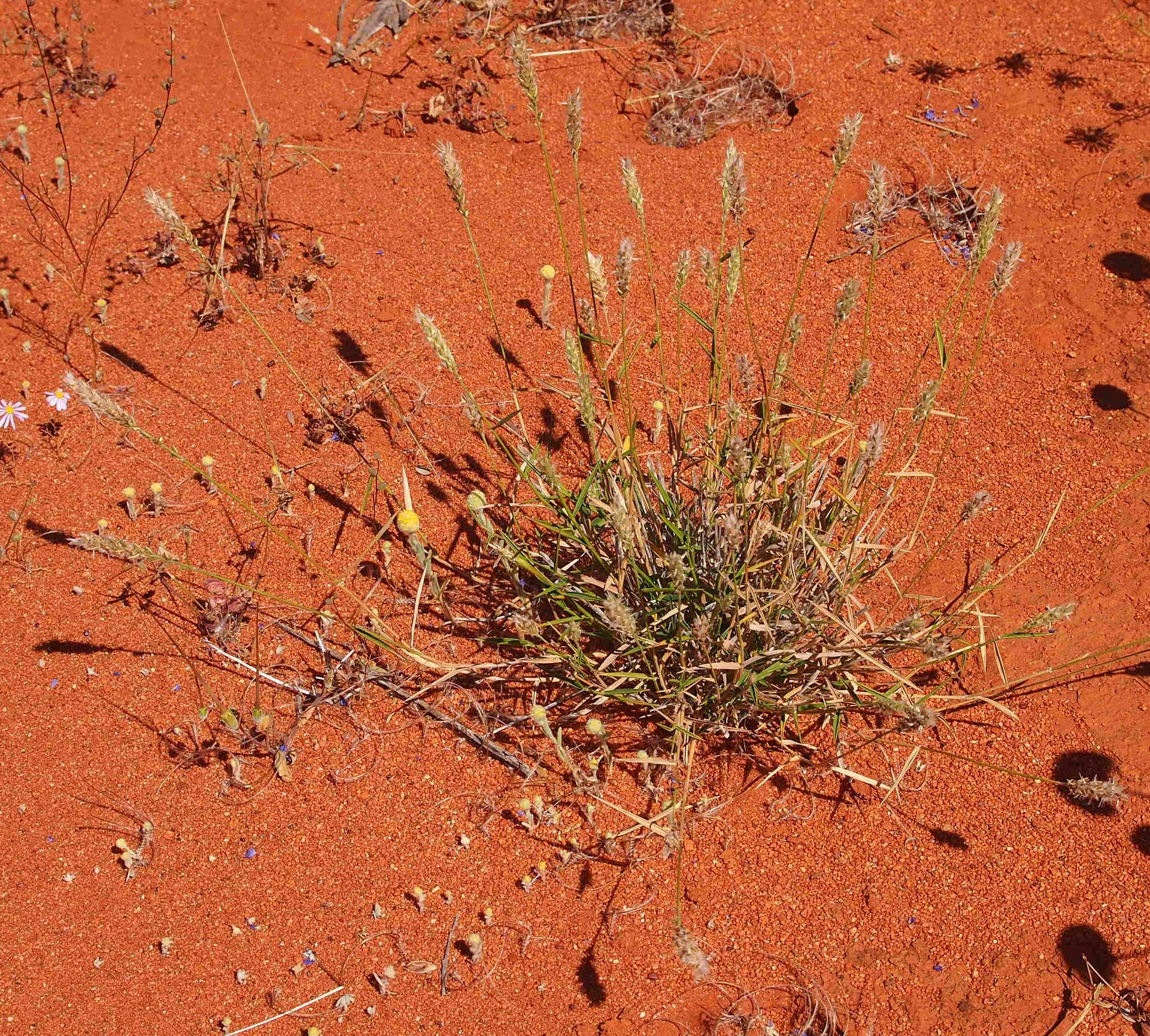
- Thyridolepis mitchelliana

Scientific classification
- Kingdom: Plantae
- Clade: Tracheophytes
- Clade: Angiosperms
- Clade: Monocots
- Clade: Commelinids
- Order: Poales
- Family: Poaceae
- Subfamily: Panicoideae
- Supertribe: Panicodae
- Tribe: Paniceae
- Subtribe: Neurachninae
- Genus: Thyridolepis; S.T.Blake

Type species
- Thyridolepis mitchelliana (Nees) S.T.Blake

= Thyridolepis =

Genus of grasses

Thyridolepis is a genus of Australian plants in the family Poaceae.

== Species ==
Sources:

- Thyridolepis mitchelliana (Nees) S.T.Blake
- Thyridolepis multiculmis (Pilg.) S.T.Blake
- Thyridolepis xerophila (Domin) S.T.Blake
