= Cleome oxalidea =

Scientific classification
- Kingdom: Plantae
- Clade: Tracheophytes
- Clade: Angiosperms
- Clade: Eudicots
- Clade: Rosids
- Order: Brassicales
- Family: Cleomaceae
- Genus: Cleome
- Species: C. oxalidea

Binomial name
- Cleome oxalidea F.Muell.

Species of flowering plant

Cleome oxalidea is a species of plant in the Cleomaceae family and is found in Western Australia.

The annual or ephemeral herb has a rosetted habit and typically grows to a height of 5 to 30 centimetres (2.0 to 11.8 in). It blooms between January and September producing blue-pink-purple flowers.

It is found in the Kimberley, Pilbara, Goldfields-Esperance and Mid West regions of Western Australia growing in stony sandy-loam alluvium.

The species uses C_{4} photosynthesis. The C_{4} pathway in this species evolved independently from the two other C_{4} Cleome species, C. angustifolia and C. gynandra.
