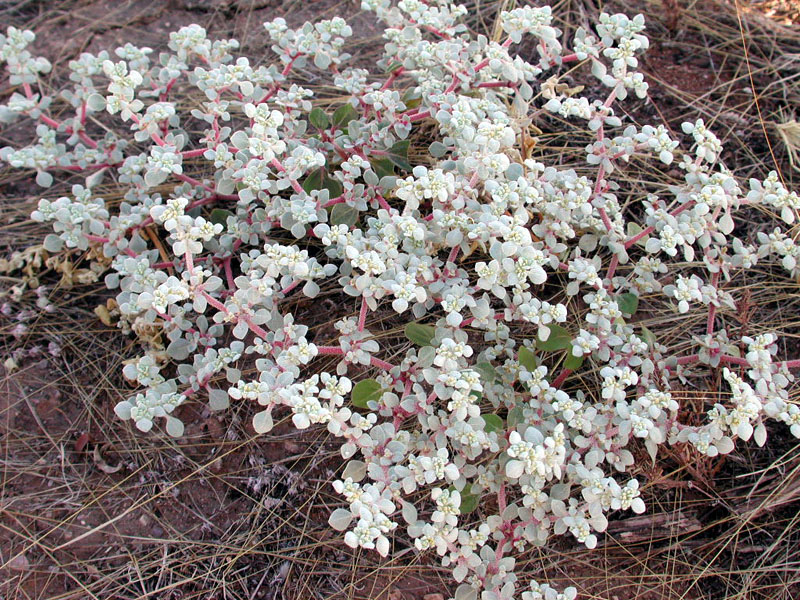
- Tidestromia lanuginosa

Scientific classification
- Kingdom: Plantae
- Clade: Tracheophytes
- Clade: Angiosperms
- Clade: Eudicots
- Order: Caryophyllales
- Family: Amaranthaceae
- Subfamily: Gomphrenoideae
- Genus: Tidestromia; Standl.

Species
- 6 or 7

= Tidestromia =

Family of shrubs

Tidestromia is a genus with about six or seven species of annual or subshrub perennial plants native to desert and semi-arid regions of the western United States, Mexico and tropical America in the family Amaranthaceae. A common name of some species is honeysweet. The stems are reddish and contrast conspicuously with the silvery leaves. This genus is named for the botanist Ivar Tidestrom.

Species include:

- Tidestromia carnosa - fleshy honeysweet
- Tidestromia gemmata - TransPecos honeysweet
- Tidestromia lanuginosa - woolly tidestromia
- Tidestromia oblongifolia - Arizona honeysweet
- Tidestromia suffruticosa - shrubby honeysweet
