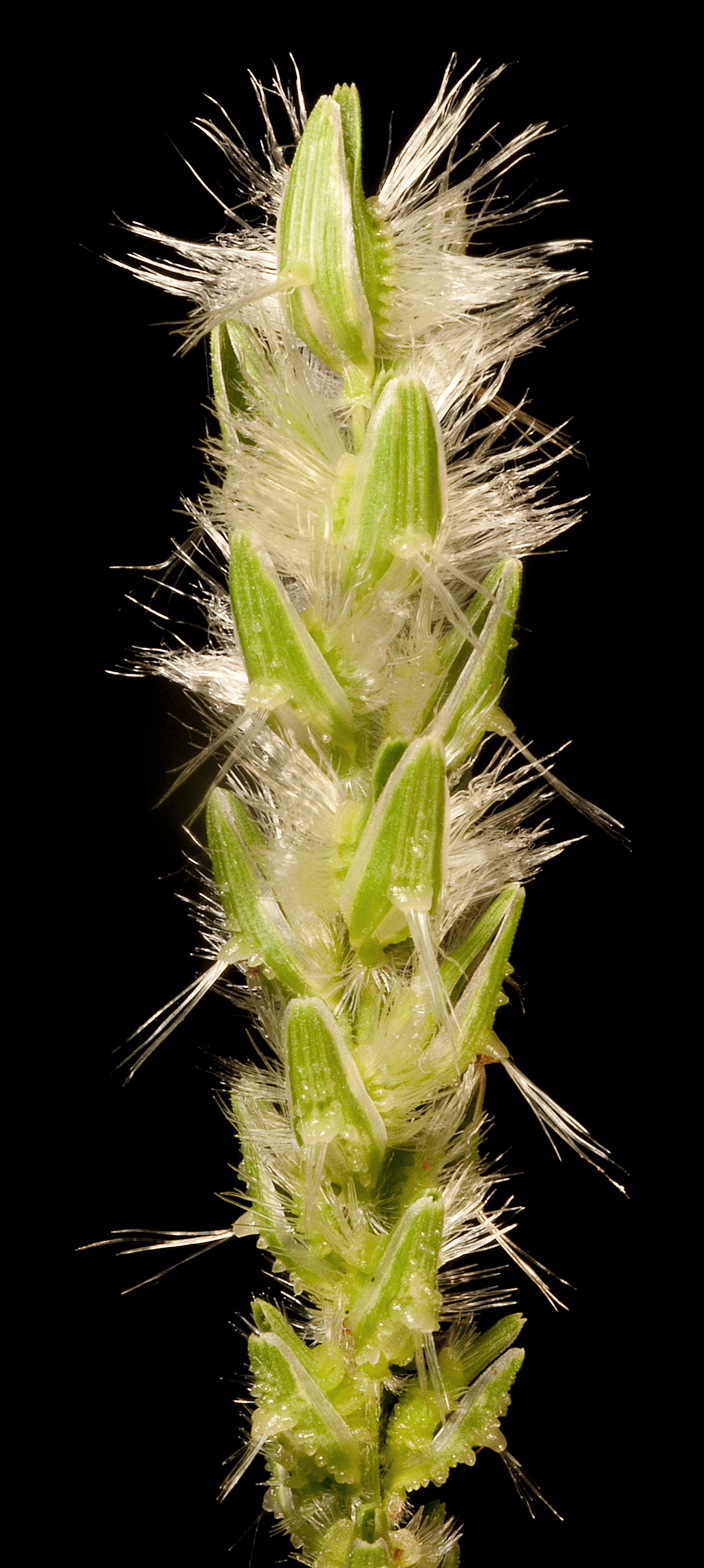

Scientific classification
- Kingdom: Plantae
- Clade: Tracheophytes
- Clade: Angiosperms
- Clade: Monocots
- Clade: Commelinids
- Order: Poales
- Family: Poaceae
- Subfamily: Panicoideae
- Genus: Thyridolepis
- Species: T. mitchelliana

Binomial name
- Thyridolepis mitchelliana (Nees) S.T.Blake

Synonyms
- Neurachne mitchelliana Nees

= Thyridolepis mitchelliana =

Species of plant

Thyridolepis mitchelliana (common name mulga grass or mulga mitchell grass) is a plant in the grass family, found in all mainland states and territories of Australia, except Victoria.

It was first described in 1843 by Christian Gottfried Daniel Nees von Esenbeck as Neurachne mitchelliana, but was transferred to the genus Thyridolepis in 1972 by Stanley Blake.

The species epithet, mitchelliana, honours Thomas Livingstone Mitchell.
