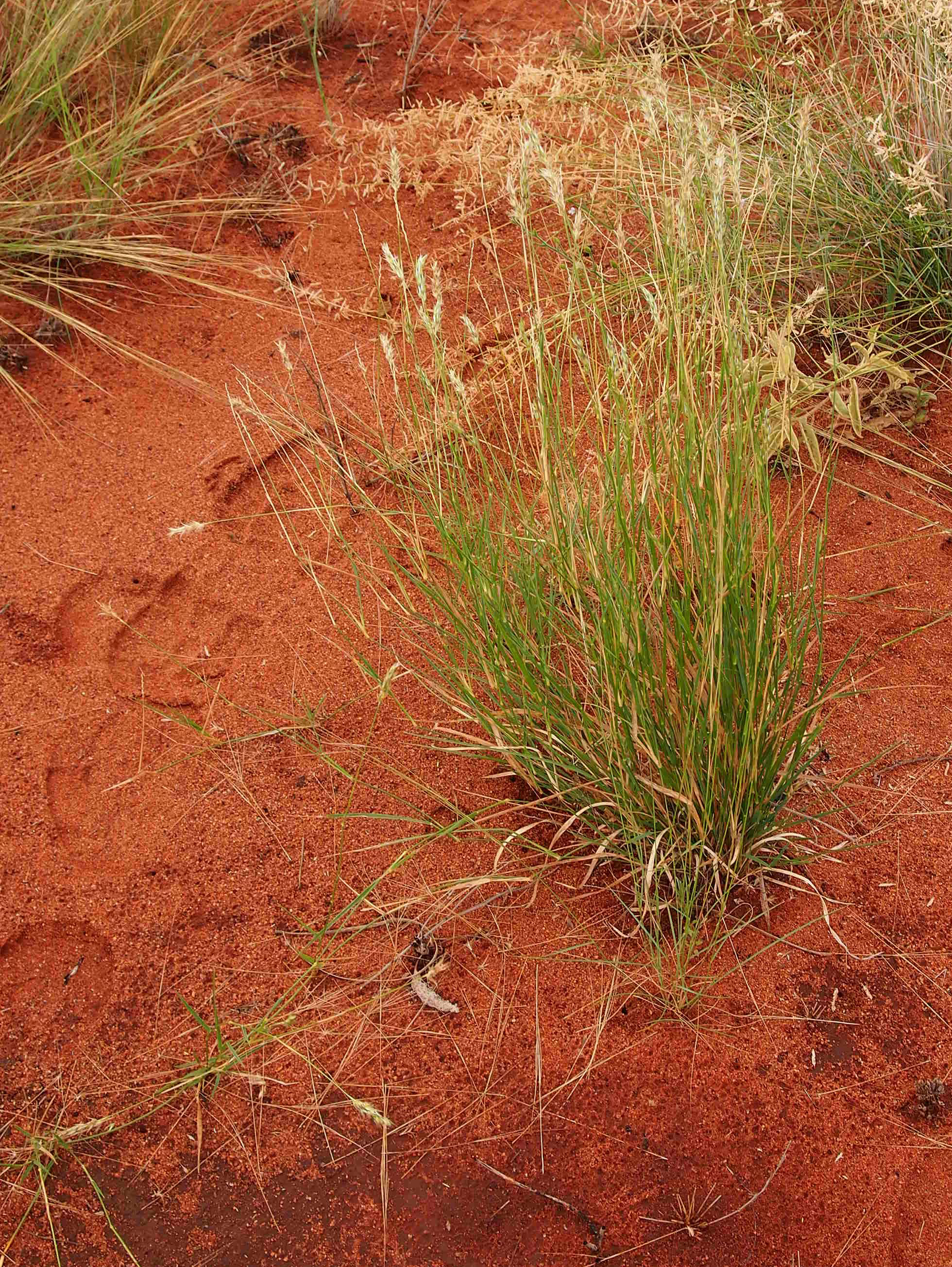

Scientific classification
- Kingdom: Plantae
- Clade: Tracheophytes
- Clade: Angiosperms
- Clade: Monocots
- Clade: Commelinids
- Order: Poales
- Family: Poaceae
- Subfamily: Panicoideae
- Genus: Paraneurachne; S.T.Blake
- Species: P. muelleri

Binomial name
- Paraneurachne muelleri (Hack.) S.T.Blake

Synonyms
- Neurachne muelleri Hack.; Neurachne clementii Domin

= Paraneurachne =

Genus of grasses

Paraneurachne is a genus of Australian plants in the grass family. The only known species is Paraneurachne muelleri native to Western Australia, South Australia, Northern Territory, and Queensland.
