= Central Hunter Valley eucalypt forest and woodland =

Endangered ecological community

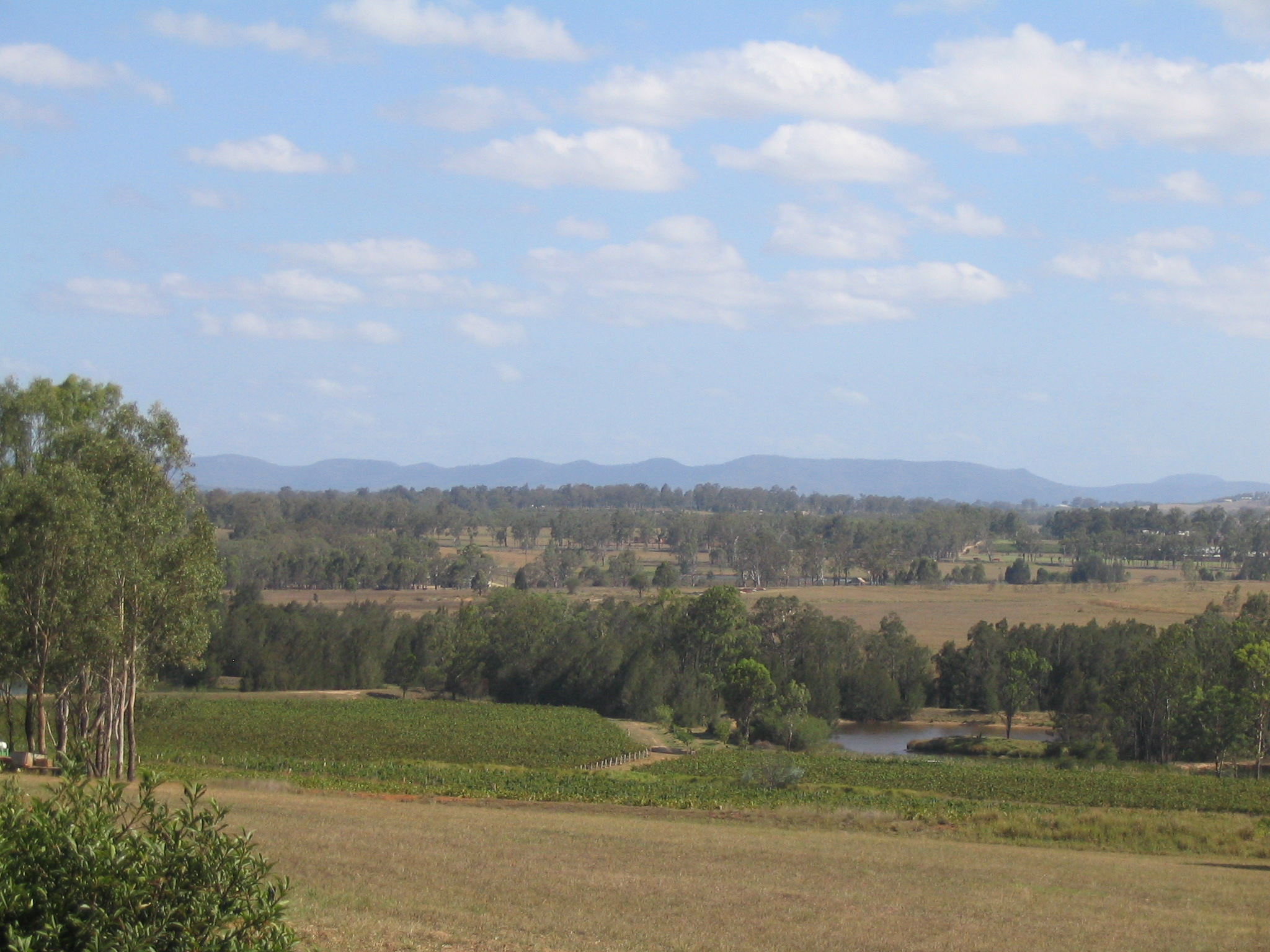

Ecology
- Realm: Australasia
- Biome: Tropical and subtropical grasslands, savannas, and shrublands
- Borders: Blue Mountains and Southern Highlands Basalt Forests; Southeast Australia temperate savanna; Blue Mountains Shale Cap Forest

Geography
- Country: Australia
- Elevation: 40–80 metres (130–260 ft)
- Coordinates: 32.58°S 151.52°E
- Climate type: Humid subtropical climate (Cfa)
- Soil types: Sand-clay

The Central Hunter Valley eucalypt forest and woodland is a grassy woodland community situated in the Hunter Valley, New South Wales, Australia. The community forms part of the broader Coastal Valley Grassy Woodlands vegetation class and was listed as critically endangered under Australian national environmental law in May 2015. The Warkworth Sands Woodland of the Hunter Valley, situated in the area, was gazetted as an endangered ecological community in New South Wales on 13 December 2002 under the NSW Threatened Species Conservation Act 1995 and now under the Biodiversity Act of 2016.

== Geography ==
It is found on low hillslopes and low ridges, or valley floors in undulating land, on soils traced from finer grained sedimentary rocks. The Warkworth Sands Woodland occurs on aeolian sand deposits south of Singleton in the Hunter Valley. These sand dunes are thought to date from the Pleistocene, are from 1–6 m high and rest on a river terrace. Under the Commonwealth EPBC Act it is listed as Warkworth Sands Woodland of the Hunter Valley.

Warkworth Sands Woodland is found in a small area near Warkworth, with only 800 hectares remaining (thought to be perhaps 13% of its pre-settlement extent). The entire known endangered community lies outside conservation reserves. Extending from Newcastle in the southeast to Murrurundi to the northwest, traversing large towns such as Singleton and Muswellbrook, the community features mid to low woodland that is generally dominated by Angophora floribunda in its canopy and Banksia integrifolia subsp. integrifolia or Acacia filicifolia in the sub-canopy.

== Ecology ==
It is dominated by Eucalyptus crebra, Corymbia maculata, Eucalyptus dawsonii, Angophora floribunda, Eucalyptus blakelyi, Eucalyptus glaucina, Eucalyptus tereticornis and Eucalyptus moluccana. Other tree species include Brachychiton populneus, Callitris endlicheri, Acacia salicina, Eucalyptus albens and Eucalyptus punctata.

Animals include Litoria aurea, Petrogale penicillata, Pteropus poliocephalus, Pseudomys novaehollandiae, Dasyurus maculatus, Chalinolobus dwyeri, Nyctophilus corbeni, and Grantiella picta. Threatened fauna which have been recorded in Warkworth Sands Woodland are: Petaurus norfolcensis, (squirrel glider), Chthonicola saggitata (speckled warbler), Climacteris picumnus victoriae (brown treecreeper) and Pomatostomus temporalis temporalis (grey-crowned babbler).

Plant species listed as occurring in Warkworth Sands Woodland in the Sydney Basin Bioregion

1. Acacia falcata
2. Acacia filicifolia
3. Ajuga australis
4. Allocasuarina littoralis
5. Allocasuarina luehmannii
6. Amyema pendulum
7. Angophora floribunda
8. Aristida calycina
9. Aristida ramosa
10. Aristida vagans
11. Aristida warburgii
12. Banksia integrifolia
13. Brachyloma daphnoides
14. Breynia oblongifolia
15. Callitris endlicheri
16. Calotis cuneifolia
17. Cheilanthes sieberi
18. Chrysocephalum apiculatum
19. Desmodium varians
20. Dianella revoluta
21. Dichondra species A
22. Echinopogon caespitosus
23. Echinopogon intermedius
24. Einadia trigonos
25. Entolasia stricta
26. Eucalyptus glaucina
27. Eucalyptus blakelyi/tereticornis intergrades
28. Eucalyptus crebra
29. Exocarpos cupressiformis
30. Exocarpos strictus
31. Hardenbergia violacea
32. Hibbertia linearis
33. Hovea linearis
34. Hypoxis hygrometrica
35. Imperata cylindrica
36. Indigofera australis
37. Jacksonia scoparia
38. Leucopogon muticus
39. Lomandra glauca
40. Lomandra leucocephala
41. Melaleuca decora
42. Melaleuca thymifolia
43. Persoonia linearis
44. Pimelea linifolia
45. Pomax umbellata
46. Pteridium esculentum
47. Solanum prinophyllum
48. Vittadinia sulcata

== NSW cases involving Warkworth Sands Woodland ==
1. Bulga Milbrodale Progress Association Inc v Minister for Planning and Infrastructure and Warkworth Mining Limited [2013] NSWLEC 48 Bulga Milbrodale Progress association won its appeal against a ministerially approved extension of the open-cut Warkworth Mine.
2. Warkworth Mining Limited v Bulga Milbrodale Progress Association Inc [2014] NSWCA 105. This case appealed the previous decision of the Land and Environment court which disallowed an extension of the open-cut mine. The appeal was dismissed.

== Gallery ==
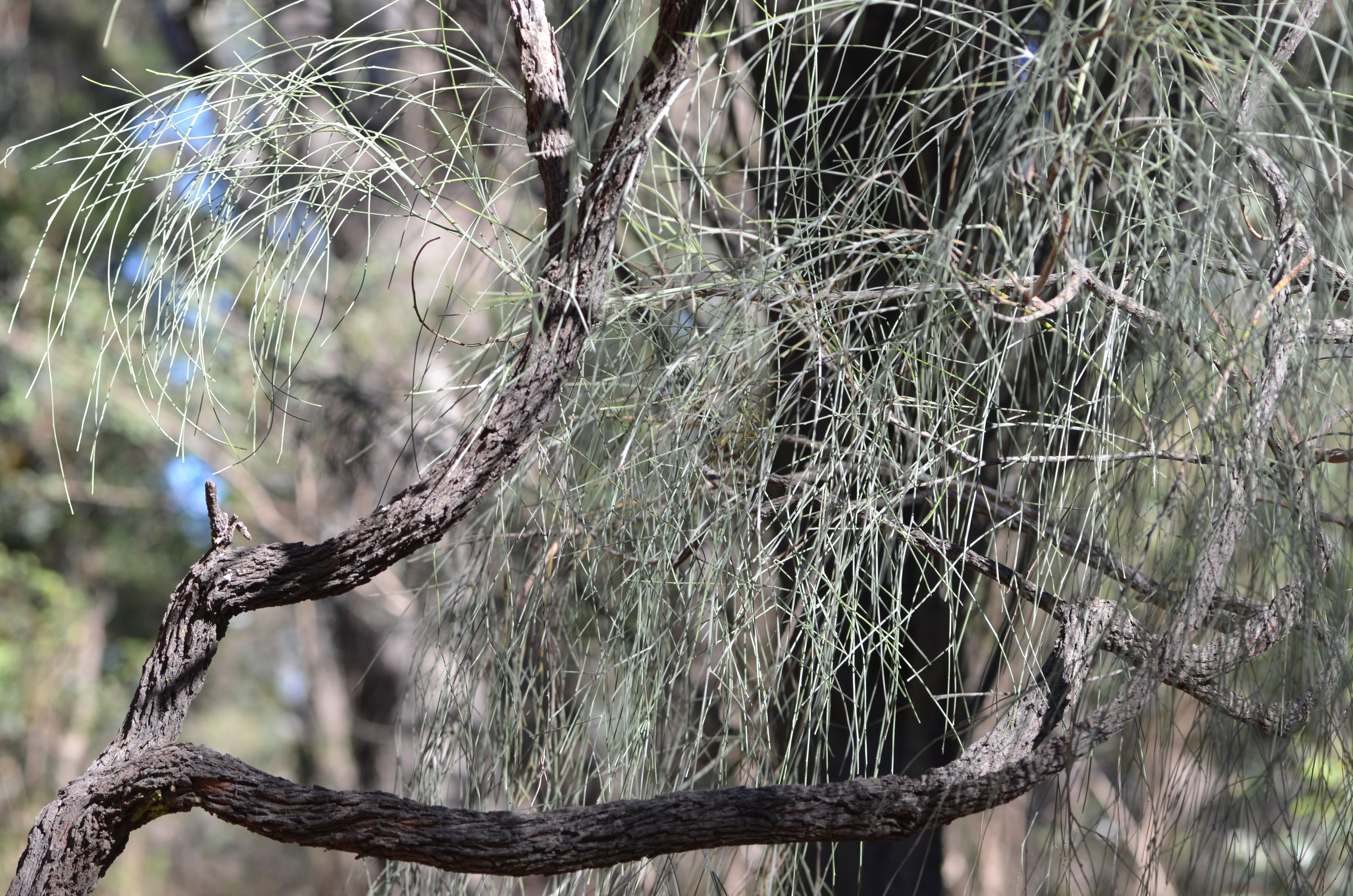
Jacksonia scoparia on Warkworth Sands

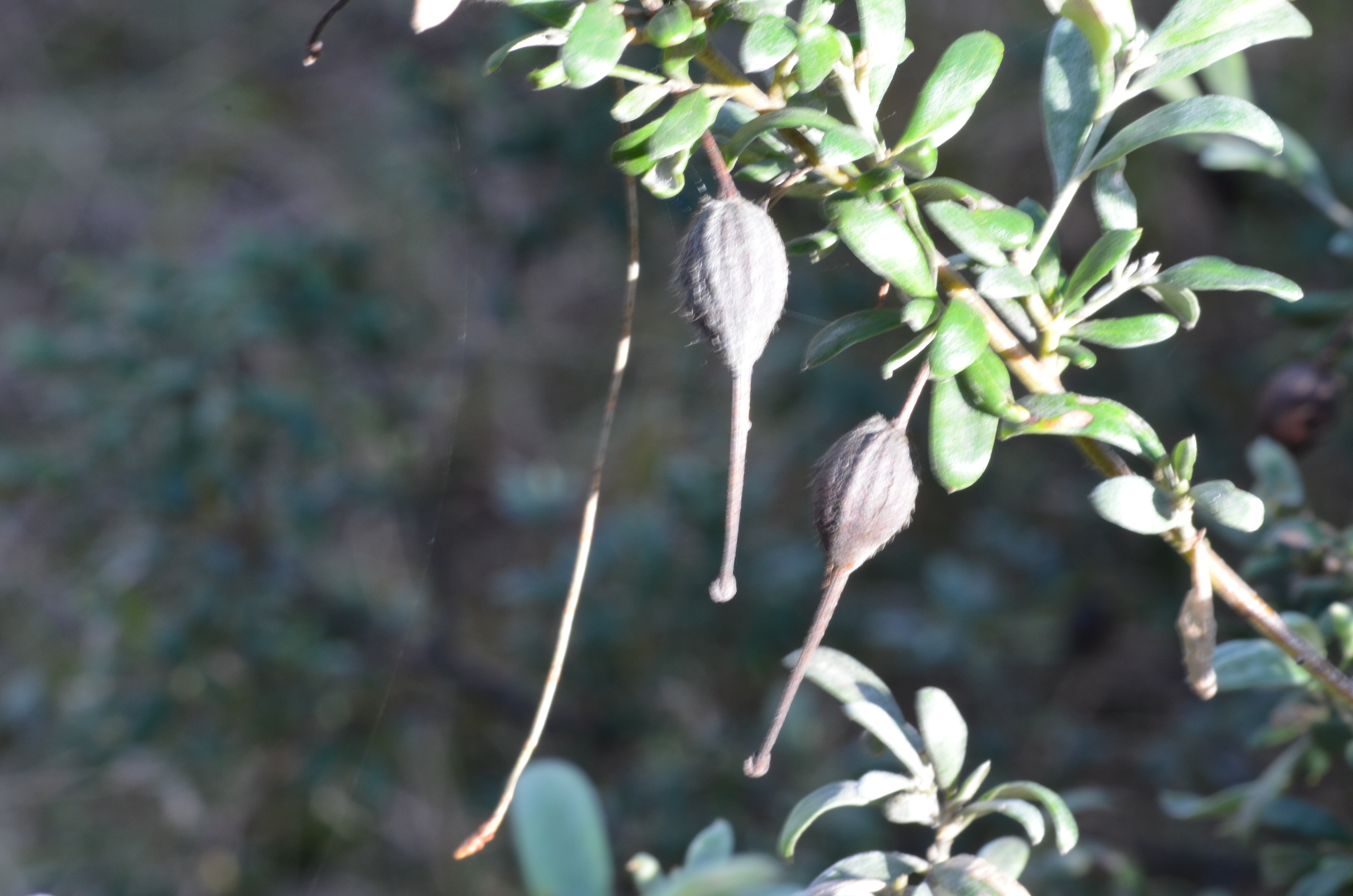
Grevillea montana on Warkworth Sands

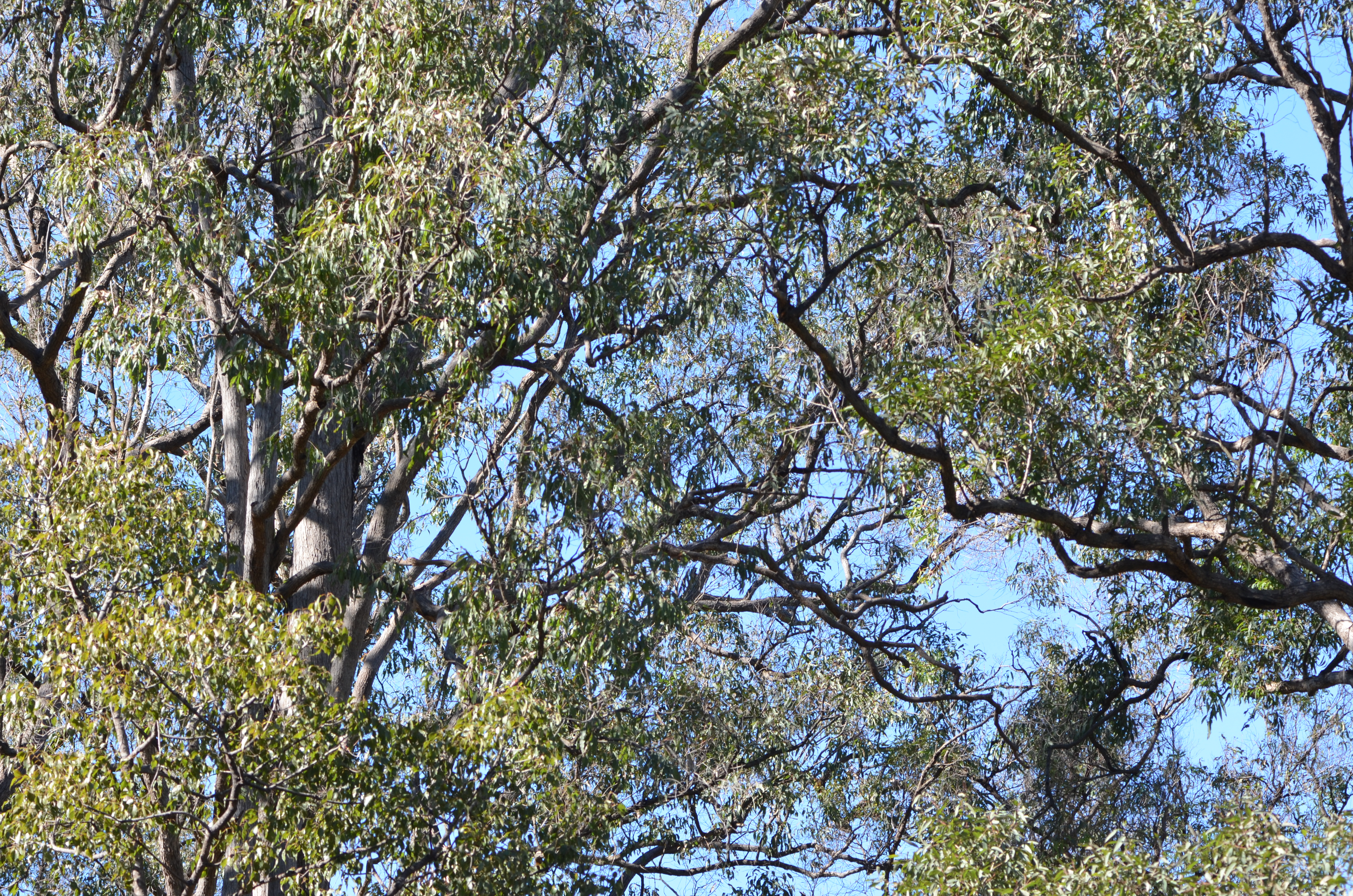
Angophora floribunda in Warkworth Sands Woodland
