= Shale Sandstone Transition Forest =

Indigenous woodland community in Sydney, Australia

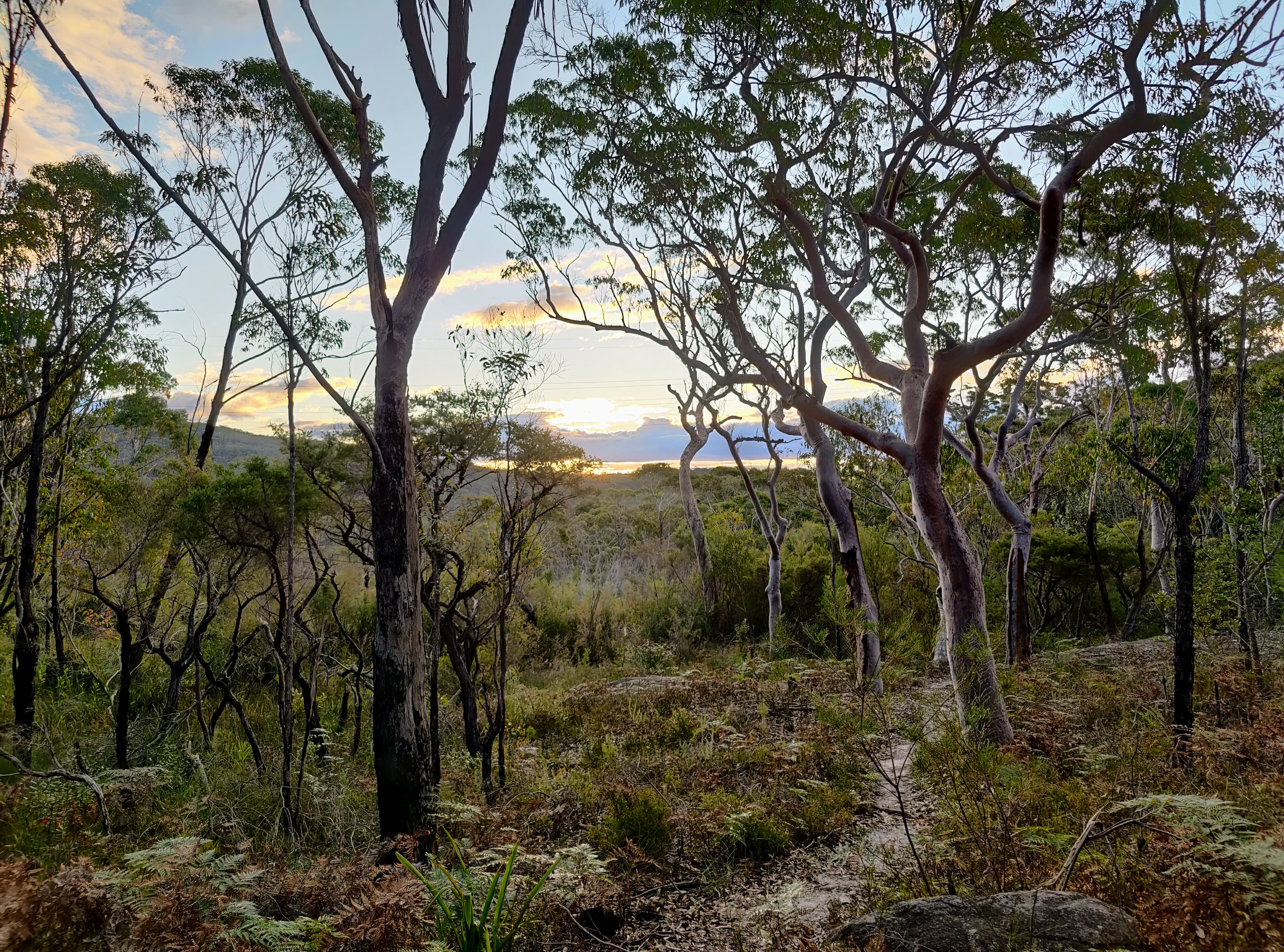
- The transitional forest at Heathcote National Park

Ecology
- Realm: Australasia
- Biome: Temperate grasslands, savannas, and shrublands Temperate Broadleaf and Mixed Forests
- Borders: Blue Mountains and Southern Highlands Basalt Forests; Cumberland Plain Woodland; Southern Highlands Shale Forest and Woodland; Blue Mountains Shale Cap Forest

Geography
- Area: 162.64 km^{2} (62.80 mi^{2})
- Country: Australia
- Elevation: 50–300 metres (160–980 ft)
- Coordinates: 33°59′59″S 150°54′40″E
- Geology: Sandstone, shale, laminite and siltstone
- Climate type: Humid subtropical climate (Cfa)
- Soil types: Clay, sand (podsol, entisols, lithosols), loam

The Shale Sandstone Transition Forest, also known as Cumberland Shale-Sandstone Ironbark Forest, is a transitory ecotone between the grassy woodlands of the Cumberland Plain Woodlands and the dry sclerophyll forests of the sandstone plateaus on the edges of the Cumberland Plain in Sydney, Australia.

Listed in 2001 under the Environment Protection and Biodiversity Conservation Act 1999, the forest lies between other ecological communities found on shale or sandstone substrates.

== Geography ==
Found on soils that are chiefly traced from shale substrates that grade with sandy soils from sandstone, the community is found in western Sydney on the bounds of the Cumberland Plain (in particular the southern boundary), and as well as on the sandstone-filled Hornsby, Woronora, and the Lower Blue Mountains plateau which edges the plain, although it is less prevalent at this area. In the Cumberland Plain, it will grade into the Cooks River/Castlereagh Ironbark ecological community, which is a forest-scrub ecoregion.

Only 22.6% of its original extent remaining today and reminiscent of a forest–savanna mosaic, the area lies on the transition between shales and sandstones of the Wianamatta and Hawkesbury Groups, including the transitional Mittagong Formation. The community is situated in an area that receives an annual rainfall between 800mm and 1100mm at an elevations less than 200 m above sea level, but may occur at about 600 m ASL at its southern extent in the Southern Highlands.

== Ecology ==
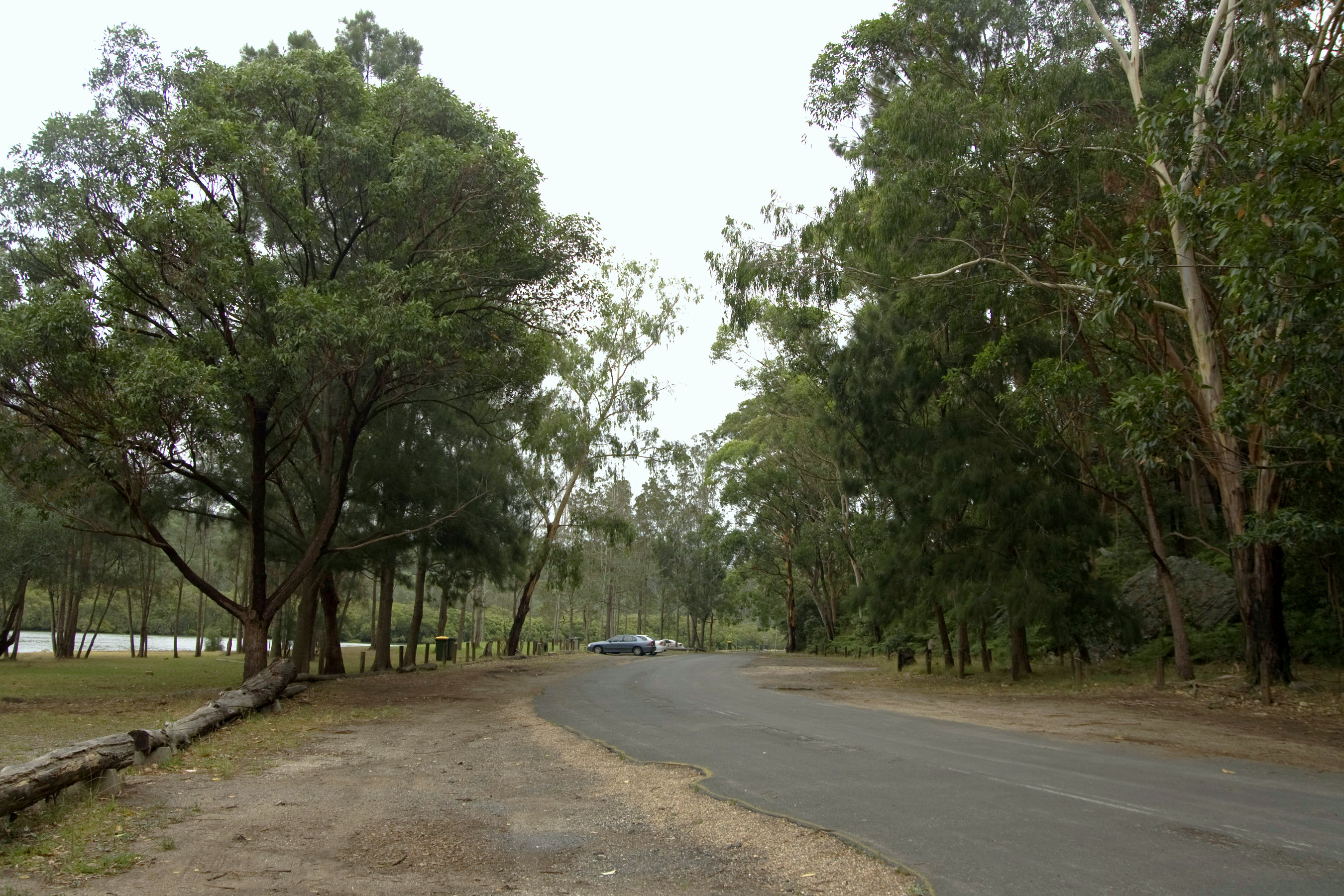
Shale Sandstone Transition Forest remnant at Georges River National Park

The community is predominated by forest or woodland with an overstorey that features several Eucalypt species and an understorey that consists of sclerophyll shrubs, grasses and herbs. Zones that are proximate to sandstone may have a more shrubby understorey, while those with less sandstone would feature more herbs and grasses in the understorey. The canopy consists of trees that reach 20 m on average, with a projective foliage cover of roughly 20%.

Species include Eucalyptus punctata, Eucalyptus crebra, Eucalyptus fibrosa, Eucalyptus tereticornis, Eucalyptus resinifera, Eucalyptus eugenioides, Eucalyptus globoidea and Angophora bakeri, in addition to smaller trees like Allocasuarina littoralis and Syncarpia glomulifera.

Shrubs include Bursaria spinosa, Kunzea ambigua, Persoonia linearis, Ozothamnus diosmifolius, Hibbertia aspera, Leucopogon juniperinus and Pultenaea villosa.

Grasses and herbs include, Aristida vagans, Austrostipa pubescens, Cheilanthes sieberi, Dichondra repens, Entolasia marginata, Entolasia stricta, Lepidosperma laterale, Lomandra multiflora, Microlaena stipoides, Pimelea linifolia, Phyllanthus hirtellus, Pomax umbellata, Pratia purpurascens, Solanum prinophyllum and Themeda triandra.

=== Fauna ===
Animals include birds such as, Pyrrholaemus saggitatus, Climacteris picumnus, Lichenostomus fuscus, Melanodryas cucullata and Psephotus haematonotus. Other animals include Saccolaimus flaviventris, Varanus rosenbergi, Pseudophryne bibronii and Pommerhelix duralensis.
