= Hibbertia notabilis =

Howe guinea-flower

Scientific classification
- Kingdom: Plantae
- Clade: Tracheophytes
- Clade: Angiosperms
- Clade: Eudicots
- Order: Dilleniales
- Family: Dilleniaceae
- Genus: Hibbertia
- Species: H. notabilis

Binomial name
- Hibbertia notabilis Toelken

Species of plant

Hibbertia notabilis, commonly known as Howe guinea-flower, is a species of flowering plant in the family Dilleniaceae and is endemic to ranges near the New South Wales - Victoria border. It is a dense, hairy shrub with ridged branches, egg-shaped to lance-shaped leaves with the narrower end towards the base and yellow flowers arranged singly on the ends of branches with ten to twelve stamens fused at their base, in a single group on one side of two carpels.

== Description ==
Hibbertia notabilis is a dense shrub that typically grows to a height of 80 cm (31 in) and has densely hairy branches. The leaves are egg-shaped to lance-shaped with the narrower end towards the base, 4.1–9.2 mm (0.16–0.36 in) long and 1.4–4.8 mm (0.055–0.189 in) wide on a petiole 0.3–0.8 mm (0.012–0.031 in) long. The lower surface of the leaves is paler and hairier than the upper surface. The flowers are arranged singly leaf axils on the ends of the branches and side-shoots on a peduncle 2.5–6.1 mm (0.098–0.240 in) long, with a bract 1.6–2.1 mm (0.063–0.083 in) long at its base. The five sepals are joined at the base, 4.1–4.5 mm (0.16–0.18 in) long and the five petals are egg-shaped with the narrower end towards the base, yellow, 5–8.6 mm (0.20–0.34 in) long. There are ten to twelve stamens fused at the base on one side of the two carpels, each carpel with four ovules. Flowering occurs from September to October.

== Taxonomy ==
Hibbertia notabilis was first formally described in 1998 by Hellmut R. Toelken in the Journal of the Adelaide Botanic Gardens from specimens collected in 1984 in the Nadgee Nature Reserve by David Albrecht. The specific epithet (notabilis) means "remarkable" or "noteworthy", referring to the small number of stamens compared to those of the similar H. aspera.

== Distribution and habitat ==
Howe guinea flower grows in open forest on the coastal ranges near the New South Wales - Victoria border, including the Howe Range.

== See also ==
- List of Hibbertia species
