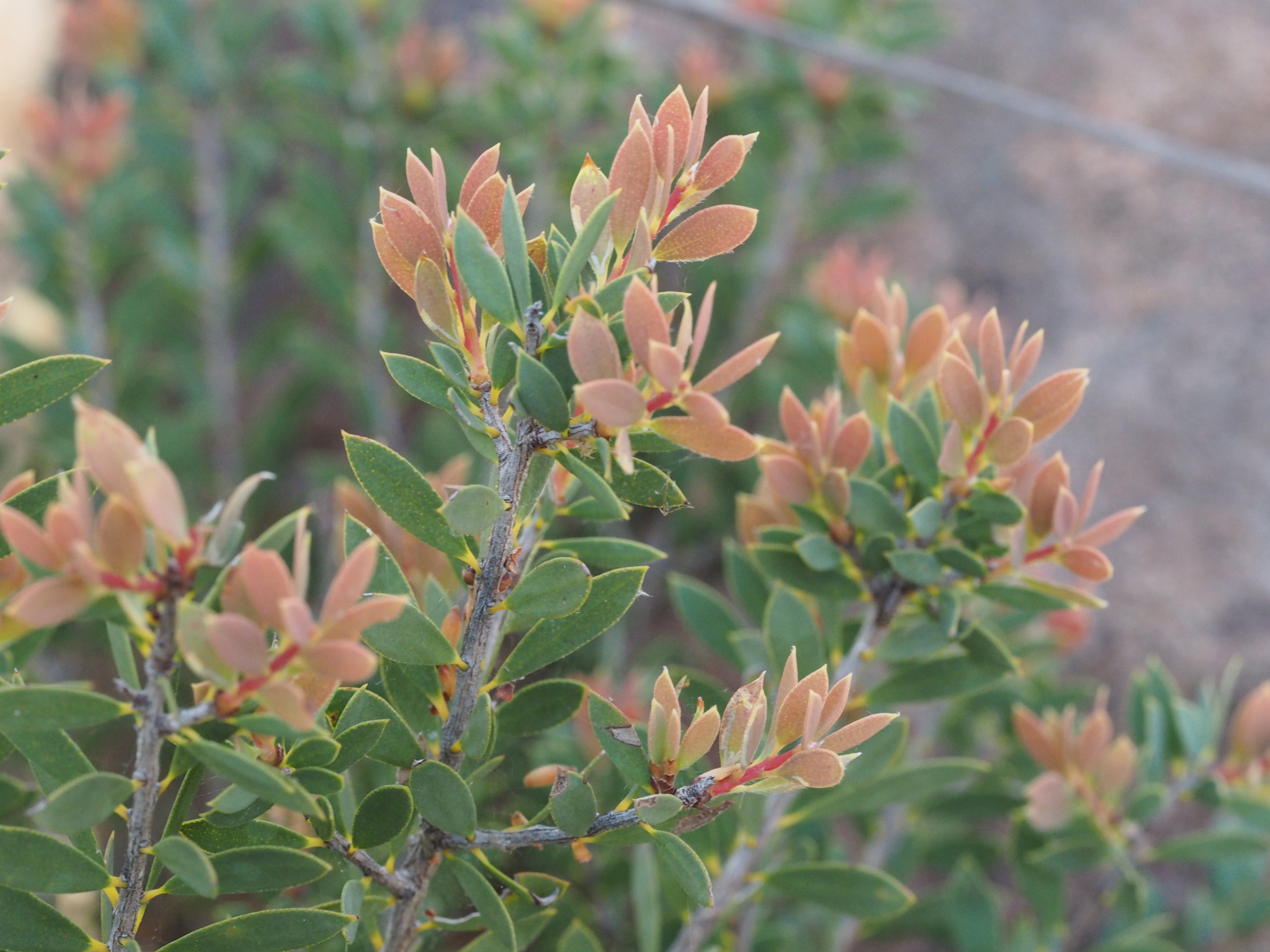
- Melaleuca deanei foliage

Conservation status
- Vulnerable (EPBC Act)

Scientific classification
- Kingdom: Plantae
- Clade: Tracheophytes
- Clade: Angiosperms
- Clade: Eudicots
- Clade: Rosids
- Order: Myrtales
- Family: Myrtaceae
- Genus: Melaleuca
- Species: M. deanei

Binomial name
- Melaleuca deanei F.Muell.

Synonyms
- Melaleuca lanceolata R.Br. ex R.T.Baker; Myrtoleucodendron deanei (F.Muell.) Kuntze

= Melaleuca deanei =

Deane's paperbark

Species of flowering plant

Melaleuca deanei, commonly known as Deane's paperbark, is a plant in the myrtle family, Myrtaceae and is endemic to New South Wales in Australia. It is a shrub with flaky bark, narrow oval leaves and spikes of white flowers in spring and summer. The species only exists in a few isolated populations and is classified as vulnerable.

== Description ==
Melaleuca deanei is a shrub with grey, fibrous flaky bark. It grows to a height of 3 m (10 ft) and its new growth is furry and white, becoming glabrous with age. The leaves are arranged alternately on the stem, 10–31 mm (0.4–1 in) long and 3–9 mm (0.1–0.4 in) wide, narrow oval shaped with a pointed end and a stalk up to 2.5 mm (0.1 in) long. The leaves have many distinct oil glands.

The flowers are white and arranged in spikes at the ends of branches which continue to grow after flowering. Each spike contains 3 to 25 individual flowers and is up to 60 mm (2 in) long and 40 mm (2 in) in diameter on a furry stem. The petals are 4–6.5 mm (0.2–0.3 in) long and fall off as the flower opens. The stamens are arranged in five bundles around the flower and each bundle contains 17 to 28 stamens. Flowering occurs from July to November and is followed by fruit which are scattered, woody, barrel-shaped capsules, each about 7–9 mm (0.3–0.4 in) long and 7 mm (0.3 in) in diameter.

== Taxonomy and naming ==
Melaleuca deanei was first formally described in 1886 by Ferdinand von Mueller in Proceedings of the Linnean Society of New South Wales from a specimen collected by Henry Deane "on the northern side of the Lane Cove River, occupying sandy ground on the ridges". The specific epithet (deanei) is "in honour of Henry Deane (1847–1924), a railways engineer who also made many contributions to Australian botany, especially in the fields of eucalyptology and palaeobotany and who collected the type material of this species".

== Distribution and habitat ==
Melaleuca deanei occurs in isolated populations, the two main ones being the Ku-ring-gai-Berowra and Holsworthy-Wedderburn districts. There are other smaller populations in the Springwood, Wollemi, Yalwal and Hawkesbury River districts. It mainly occurs in woodland on higher ground over sandstone and only occasionally in heath.

== Ecology ==
It is difficult to count the number of individual plants of M. deanei because they tend to reproduce by suckering, clones are therefore common and observations of seedlings are rare. It is estimated that there between 1,000 and 3,000 individuals in approximately 75 locations. A study of the reproductive capacity of this species has been compared with that of the more common species Melaleuca nodosa, Melaleuca thymifolia and Melaleuca styphelioides. It found that M. deanei has a lower rate of seed production than the more common species because of lower rates of flowering rather than poorer pollination rate or rate of seed setting after pollination.

== Conservation status ==
Deane's melaleuca is a threatened species under the New South Wales Government Threatened Species Conservation Act (1995) and the Australian Government Environmental Protection and Biodiversity Conservation Act (1999). Whilst some of the populations are in national parks or reserves, the threats include habitat disturbance, clearing, altered fire regimes, trail maintenance and weed encroachment. Some of the threat abatement measures include protecting sites from physical disturbance, undertaking regular monitoring and weeding of known sites.

== Gallery ==
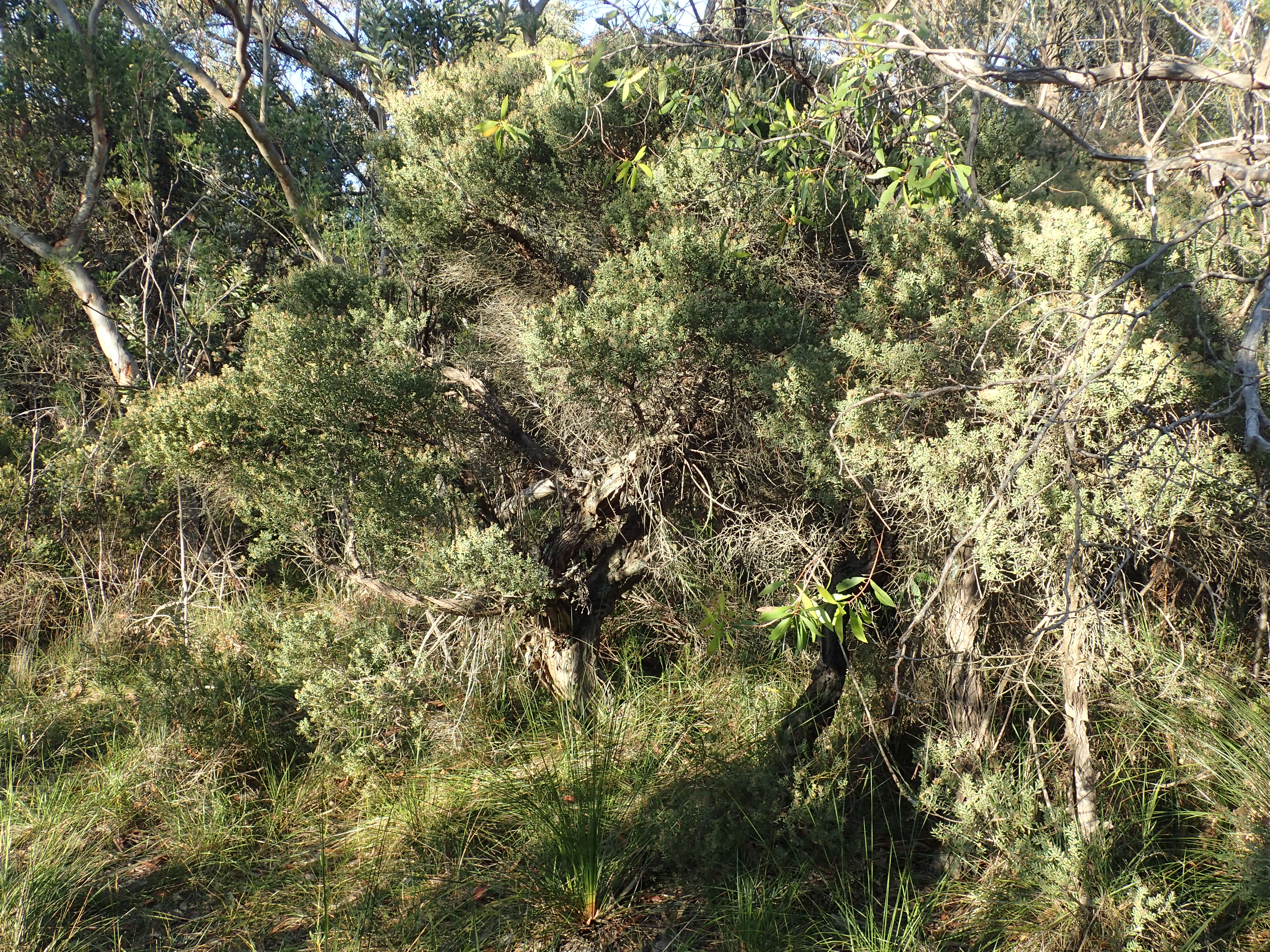
M. deanei growing in Ku-ring-gai Chase National Park

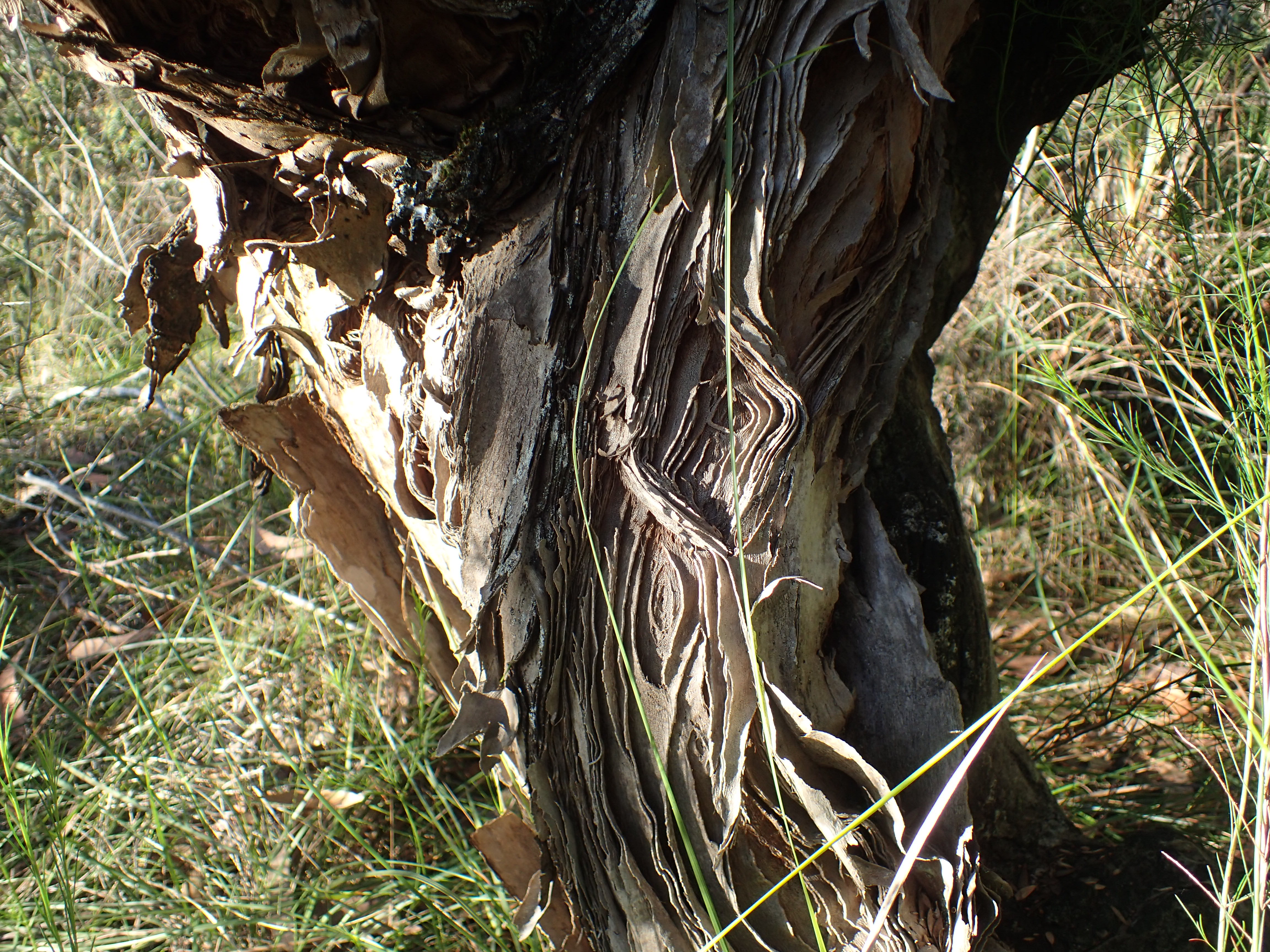
M. deanei bark

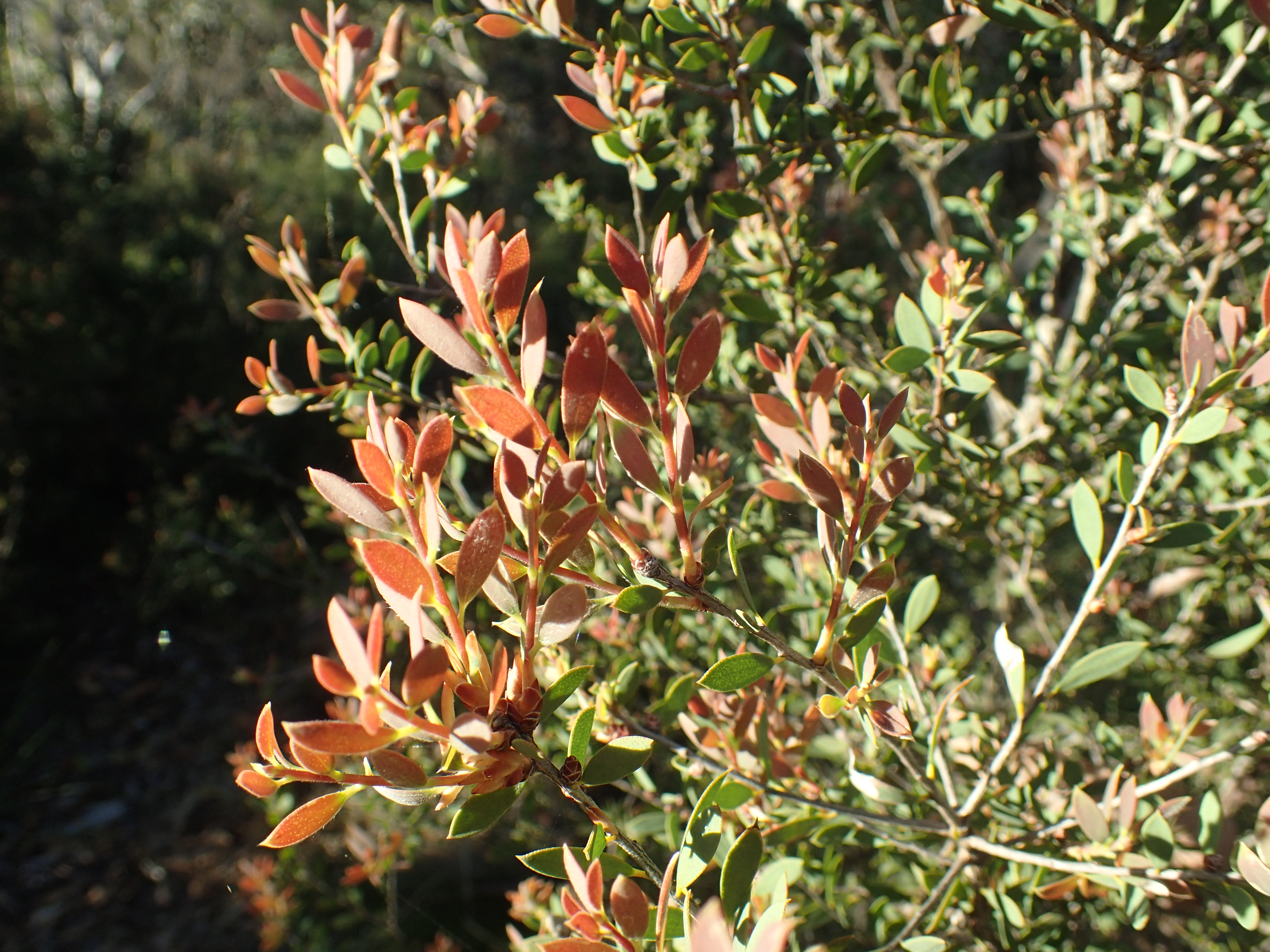
M. deanei new leaves
