= Blue Mountains Shale Cap Forest =

Ecological community in New South Wales

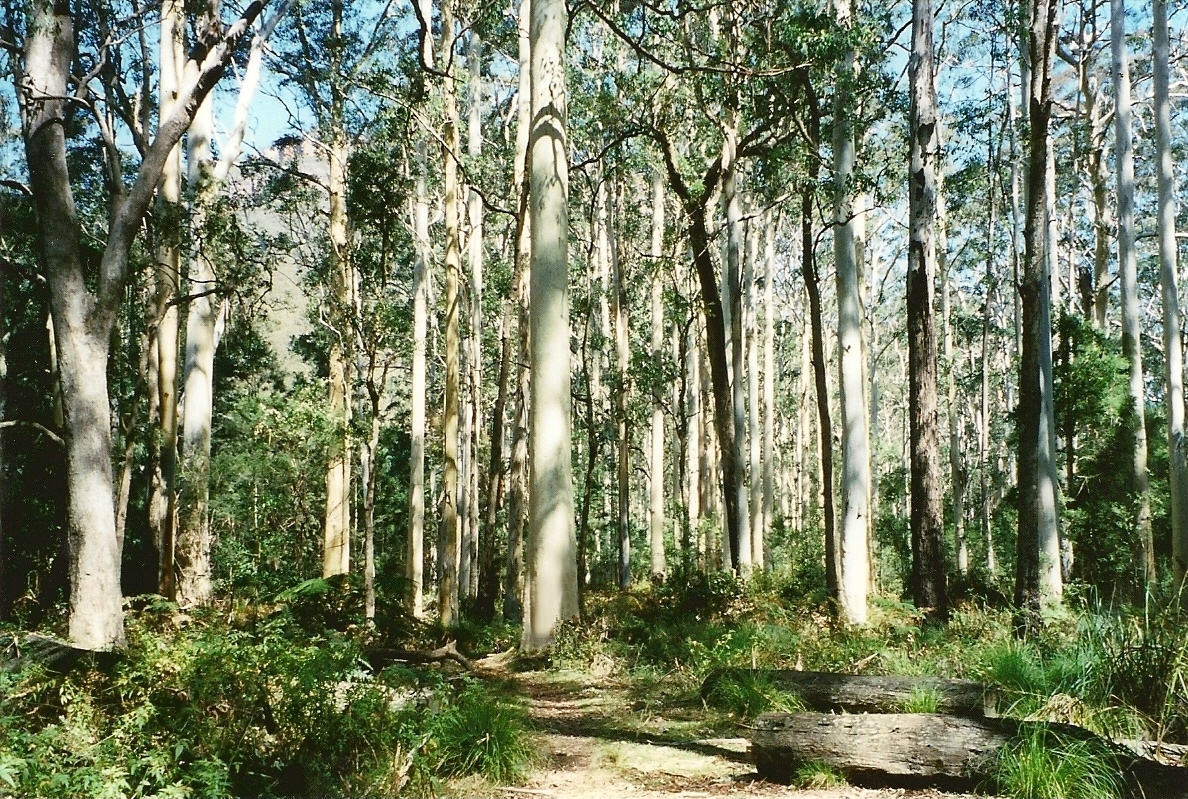

Ecology
- Realm: Australasia
- Biome: Temperate Broadleaf and Mixed Forests
- Borders: Cumberland Plain Woodland; Blue Mountains and Southern Highlands Basalt Forests; Central Hunter Valley eucalypt forest and woodland; Shale Sandstone Transition Forest

Geography
- Area: 28 km^{2} (11 mi^{2})
- Country: Australia
- Elevation: 750–1,100 metres (2,460–3,610 ft)
- Coordinates: 33.60°S 150.50°E
- Geology: Shale
- Climate type: Oceanic climate (Cfb); Humid subtropical climate (Cfa)
- Soil types: Shale, minor clay

The Blue Mountains Shale Cap Forest is a wet-sclerophyll temperate forest community predominantly found in the Blue Mountains, particularly in the Wollemi National Park, and parts of the Hawkesbury in New South Wales, Australia.

== Ecology ==
Main tree species include Eucalyptus deanei, Eucalyptus cypellocarpa and Syncarpia glomulifera. Remainder tree species are Angophora costata, Angophora floribunda, Eucalyptus notabilis, Eucalyptus piperita and Eucalyptus punctata. The biome, now extensively cleared, was originally a tall open forest and now survives as woodland or as groups of remnant trees.

The Eucalyptus deanei (mountain blue gum) is a leading supplier of tree hollows for owls, parrots, gliders and other hollow dependent animals including the threatened species Powerful Owl and Glossy Black-Cockatoo.

== Geography ==
The community lies on deep fertile soils on the Wianamatta Shale, typically within damp sheltered areas at lower to middle altitudes of the Blue Mountains and Wollemi areas. Wollondilly also has a similar community. The biome supports diverse mammals and birds than the lower, drier eucalypt forests and woodlands of the Blue Mountains.

== See also ==
- Blue Gum High Forest
- Temperate Rainforests of New South Wales
