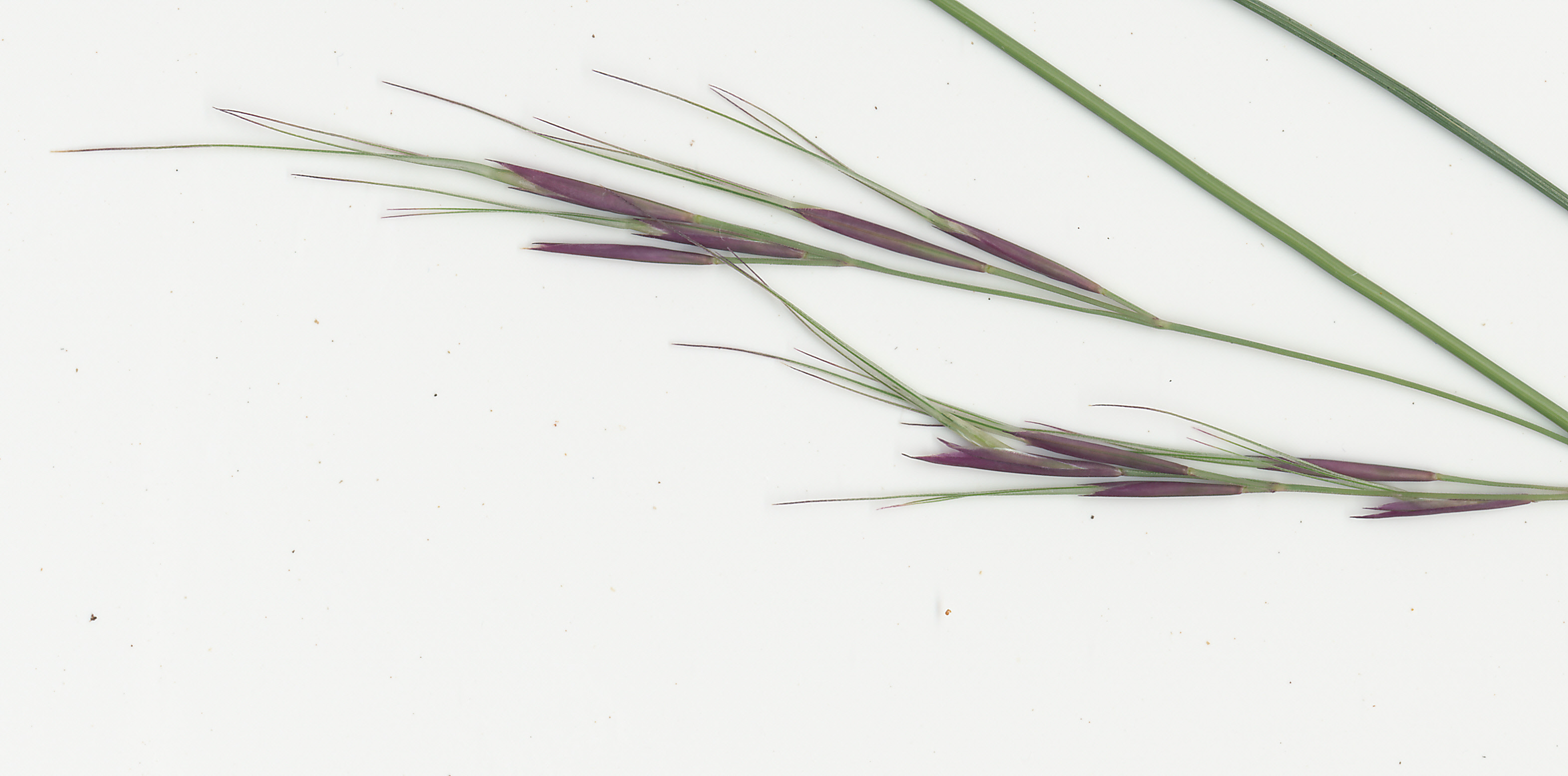

Scientific classification
- Kingdom: Plantae
- Clade: Tracheophytes
- Clade: Angiosperms
- Clade: Monocots
- Clade: Commelinids
- Order: Poales
- Family: Poaceae
- Genus: Aristida
- Species: A. calycina

Binomial name
- Aristida calycina R.Br.

= Aristida calycina =

Dark wiregrass

Species of grass

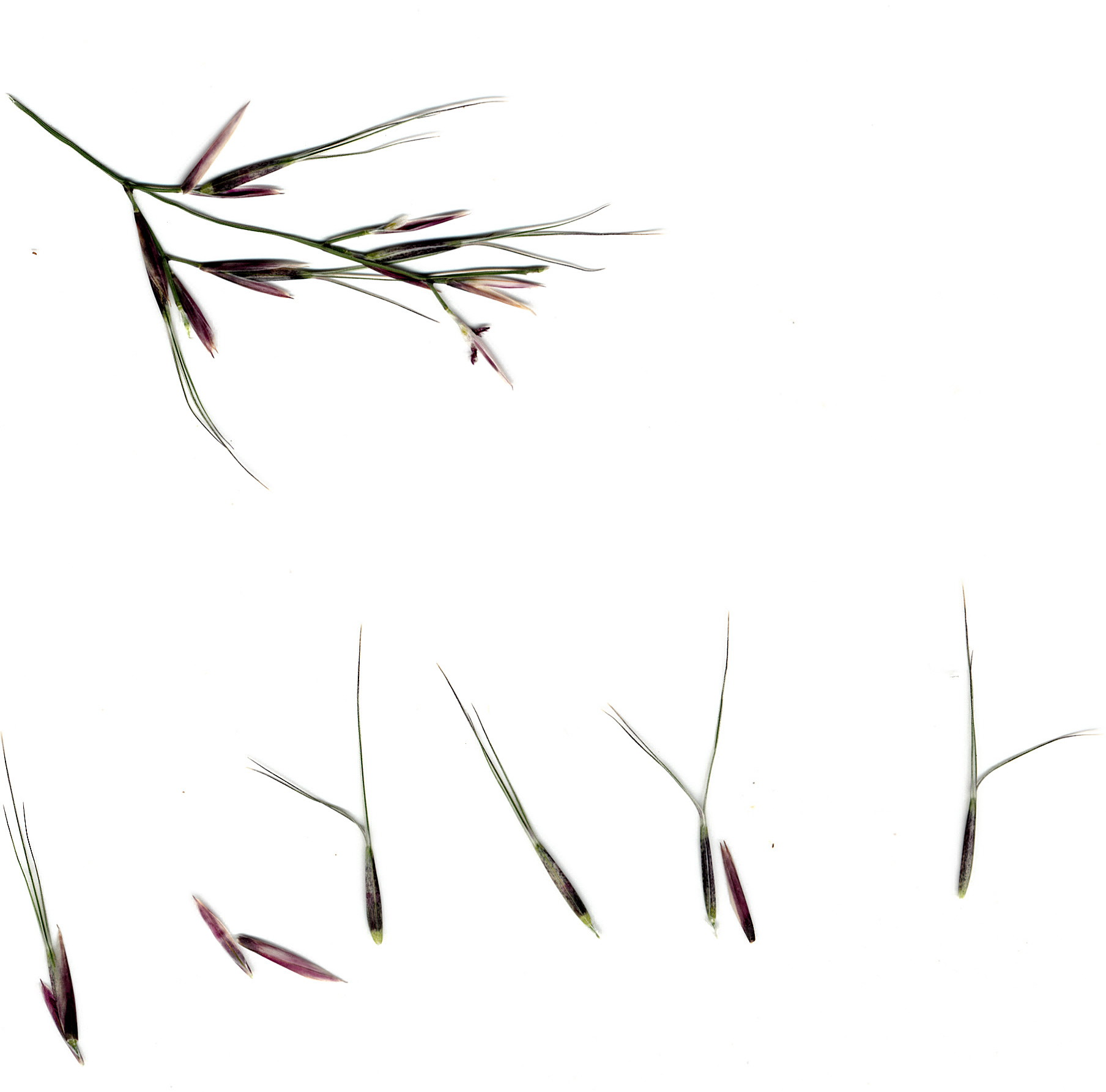
Aristida calycina flat spikelet

Aristida calycina, commonly known as dark wiregrass, is a species of grass in the family Poaceae that is native in Australia.

== Description ==
The grass-like or herbaceous perennial plant has a compact or loosely tufted habit and typically grows to a height of 0.3 to 2 m (1 ft 0 in to 6 ft 7 in). It is strongly branched and has wiry culms. The leaves have smooth or scaberulous sheaths with a ligule that is approximately 0.3 mm (0.012 in) in length. The blade is convolute or conduplicate or sometimes but in some cases is flat with a width of around 1.5 mm (0.059 in). It has lanceolate shaped glumes that are 6 to 20 mm (0.24 to 0.79 in) in length with the upper portion being obtuse and the lower part acute to acuminate. The linear to elliptic lemma is purple or brown in colour with even darker margins and 6 to 9 mm (0.24 to 0.35 in) in length. The divergent flattened awns have a length of up to 30 mm (1.2 in).

== Taxonomy ==
The species was first formally described by the botanist Robert Brown in 1810 as part of the work Prodromus florae Novae Hollandiae et insulae Van-Diemen, exhibens characteres plantarum quas annis 1802–1805. Synonyms include Aristida glumaris, Chaetaria calicina and Aristida calycina var. typica.

There are three varieties of this species:

- Aristida calycina R.Br. var. calycina
- Aristida calycina var. filifolia B.K.Simon
- Aristida calycina var. praealta Domin

== Distribution ==
Aristida calycina is found mostly in the eastern states of mainland Australia, Queensland, Victoria, New South Wales and parts of the Northern Territory with a scattered distribution that thins toward the west. In New South Wales it is found in all areas apart from the far south west and grows in sandy poor soils.

== See also ==
- List of Aristida species
