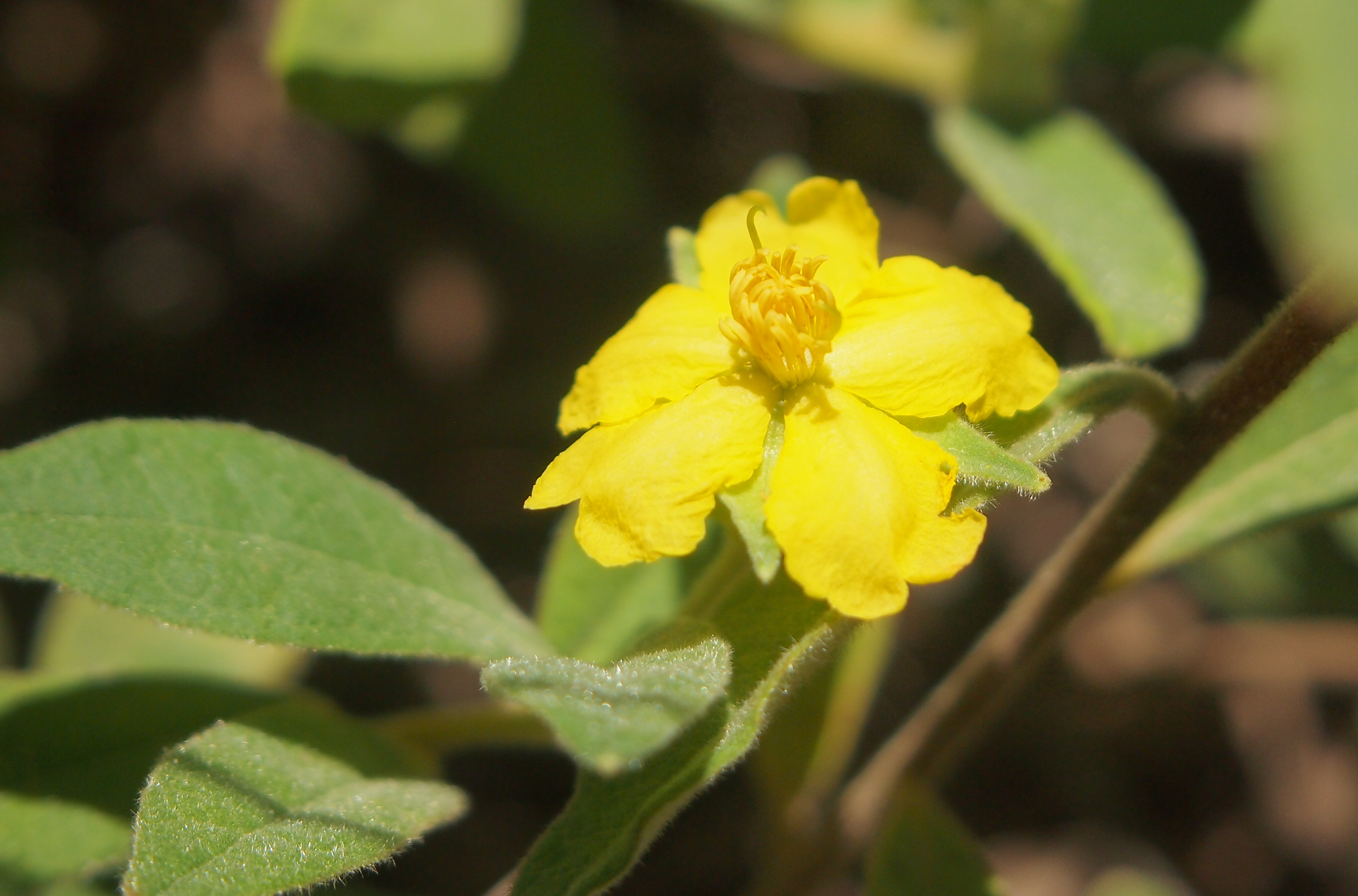
- In the Blackdown Tableland National Park

Scientific classification
- Kingdom: Plantae
- Clade: Embryophytes
- Clade: Tracheophytes
- Clade: Angiosperms
- Clade: Eudicots
- Order: Dilleniales
- Family: Dilleniaceae
- Genus: Hibbertia
- Species: H. linearis

Binomial name
- Hibbertia linearis R.Br. ex DC.

= Hibbertia linearis =

Species of flowering plant

Hibbertia linearis is a species of flowering plant in the family Dilleniaceae and is endemic to eastern Australia. It is a shrub with linear to oblong or egg-shaped leaves and yellow flowers with 15 to 25 stamens arranged around the three carpels.

== Description ==
Hibbertia linearis is an erect or diffuse shrub that typically grows to a height of 0.5–2.0 m (1 ft 8 in – 6 ft 7 in) and has glabrous stems. The leaves are variable in shape from linear to oblong, or egg-shaped with the narrower end towards the base, mostly 8–30 mm (0.31–1.18 in) long, 1–5 mm (0.039–0.197 in) wide and sessile. The flowers are arranged on the ends of the stems or in leaf axils, and are either sessile or on a peduncle 2–3 mm (0.079–0.118 in) long. The sepals are 5–6 mm (0.20–0.24 in) long and usually glabrous, the petals yellow and 8–10 mm (0.31–0.39 in) long. There are 15 to 25 stamens arranged around the three glabrous carpels. Flowering mainly occurs in spring and summer.

== Taxonomy ==
Hibbertia linearis was first formally described in 1817 by Augustin Pyramus de Candolle from an unpublished description by Robert Brown. De Candolle's description was published in his Regni Vegetabilis Systema Naturale.

In 1863, George Bentham described three variations of Hibbertia linearis and the names are accepted by the Australian Plant Census, but not by the National Herbarium of New South Wales:

- Hibbertia linearis var. floribunda Benth.;
- Hibbertia linearis var. grandiflora Benth.;
- Hibbertia linearis R.Br. ex DC. var. linearis.

== Distribution and habitat ==
Hibbertia linearis grows in heath and forest on the coast and tablelands of Queensland and New South Wales as far south as the Victorian border.
