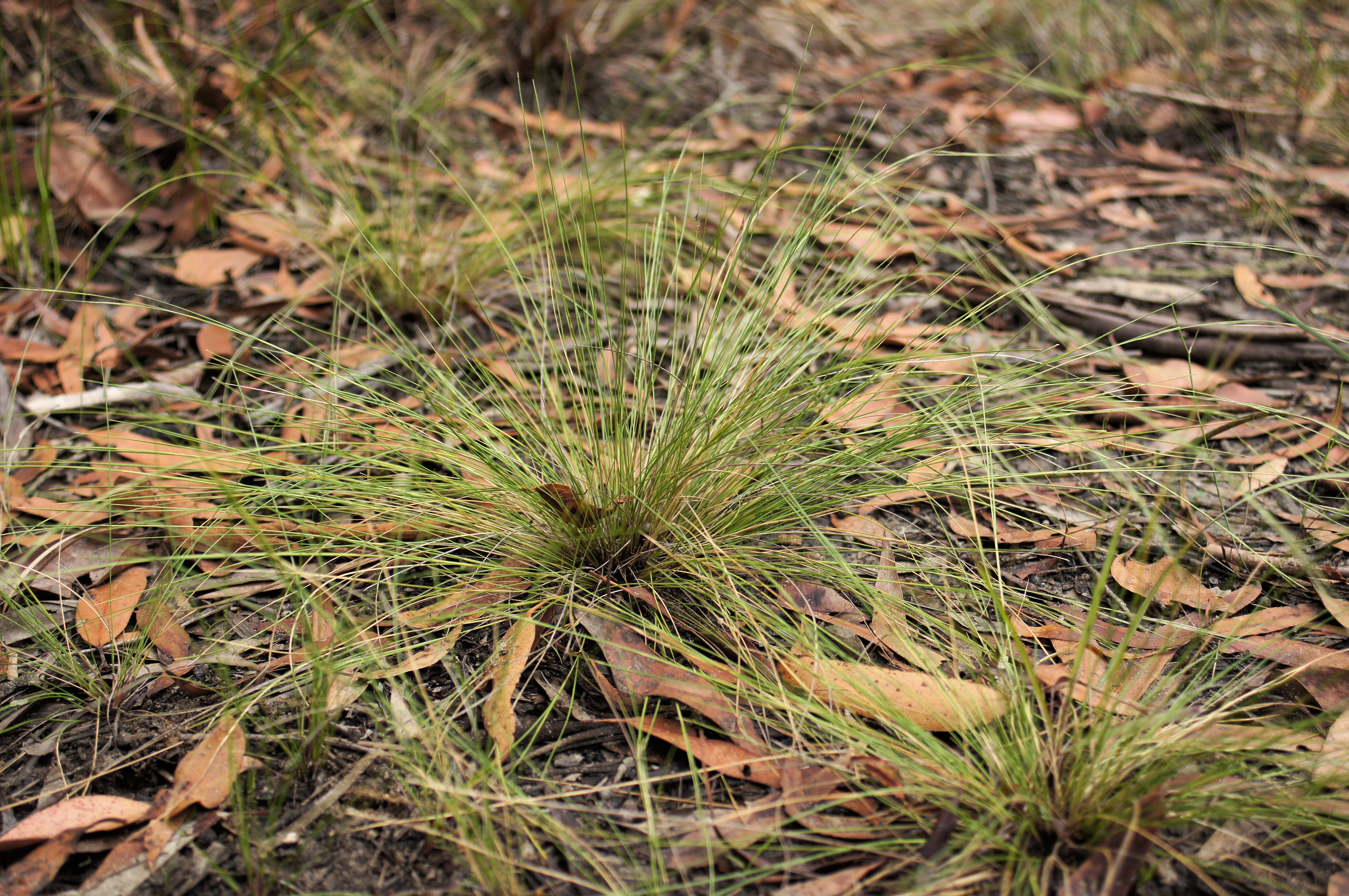

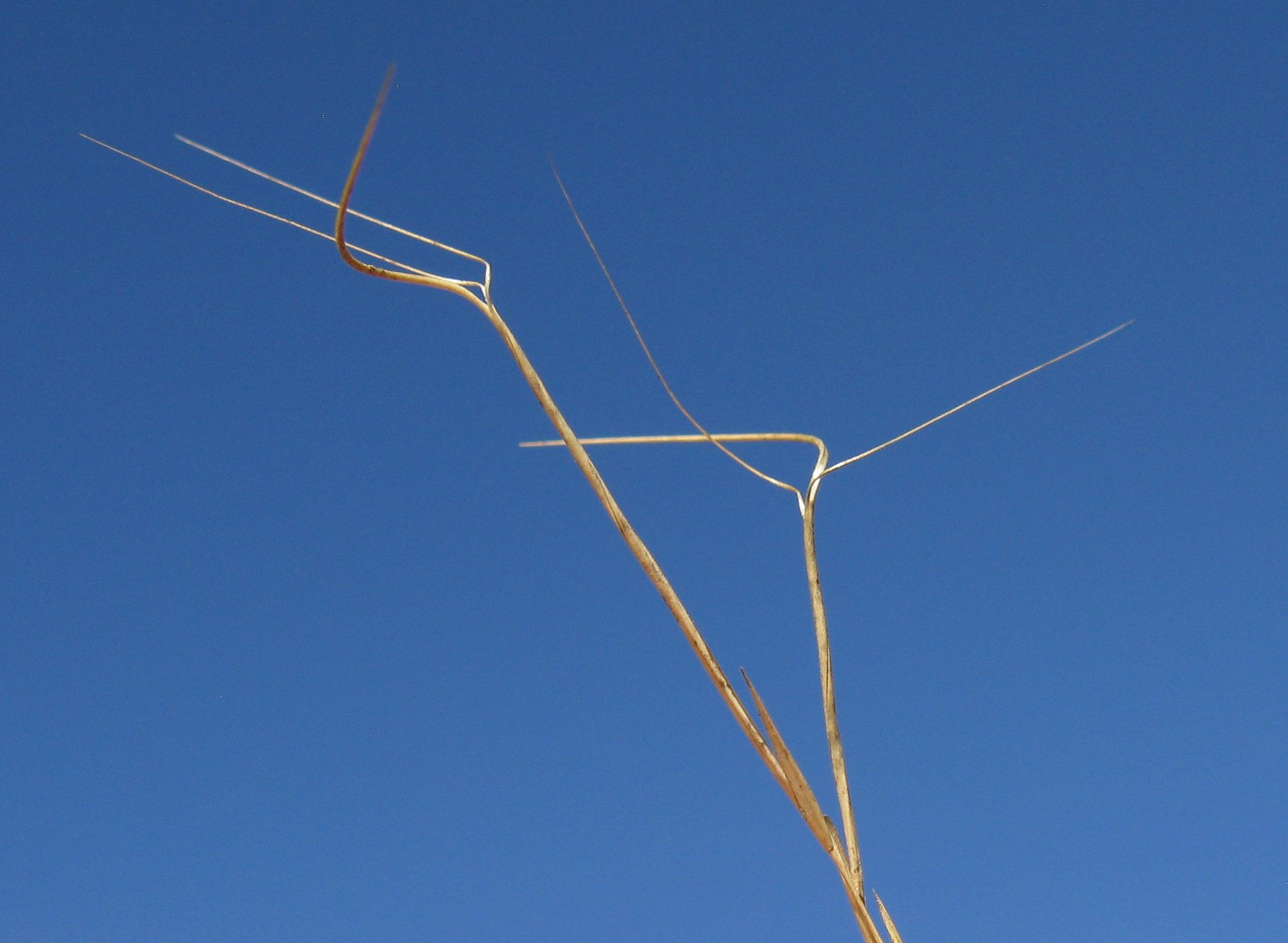

Scientific classification
- Kingdom: Plantae
- Clade: Embryophytes
- Clade: Tracheophytes
- Clade: Spermatophytes
- Clade: Angiosperms
- Clade: Monocots
- Clade: Commelinids
- Order: Poales
- Family: Poaceae
- Genus: Aristida
- Species: A. warburgii

Binomial name
- Aristida warburgii Mez

Synonyms
- Heterotypic Synonyms: Aristida heterochaeta Henrard; Aristida intricata S.T.Blake

= Aristida warburgii =

Species of grass

Aristida warburgii is a species of grass (in the family Poaceae) that is native to New South Wales and Queensland. It was first described by Carl Christian Mez in 1921 from a specimen collected near Maryborough, Queensland. The species epithet, warburgii, honours Otto Warburg.

== Description ==
A warburgii is a tufted perennial, growing from 30 to 90 cm high. The internodes are smooth. The iInflorescences are 11–15 cm (4.3–5.9 in) long and 2–7 cm (0.8–2.8 in) wide, and carry spikelets from the base. It flowers and fruits all year round, growing on sandy soils in both Eucalyptus and Melaleuca communities.

== See also ==
- List of Aristida species
