= Convolute (botany) =

Leaf morphology phenomenon

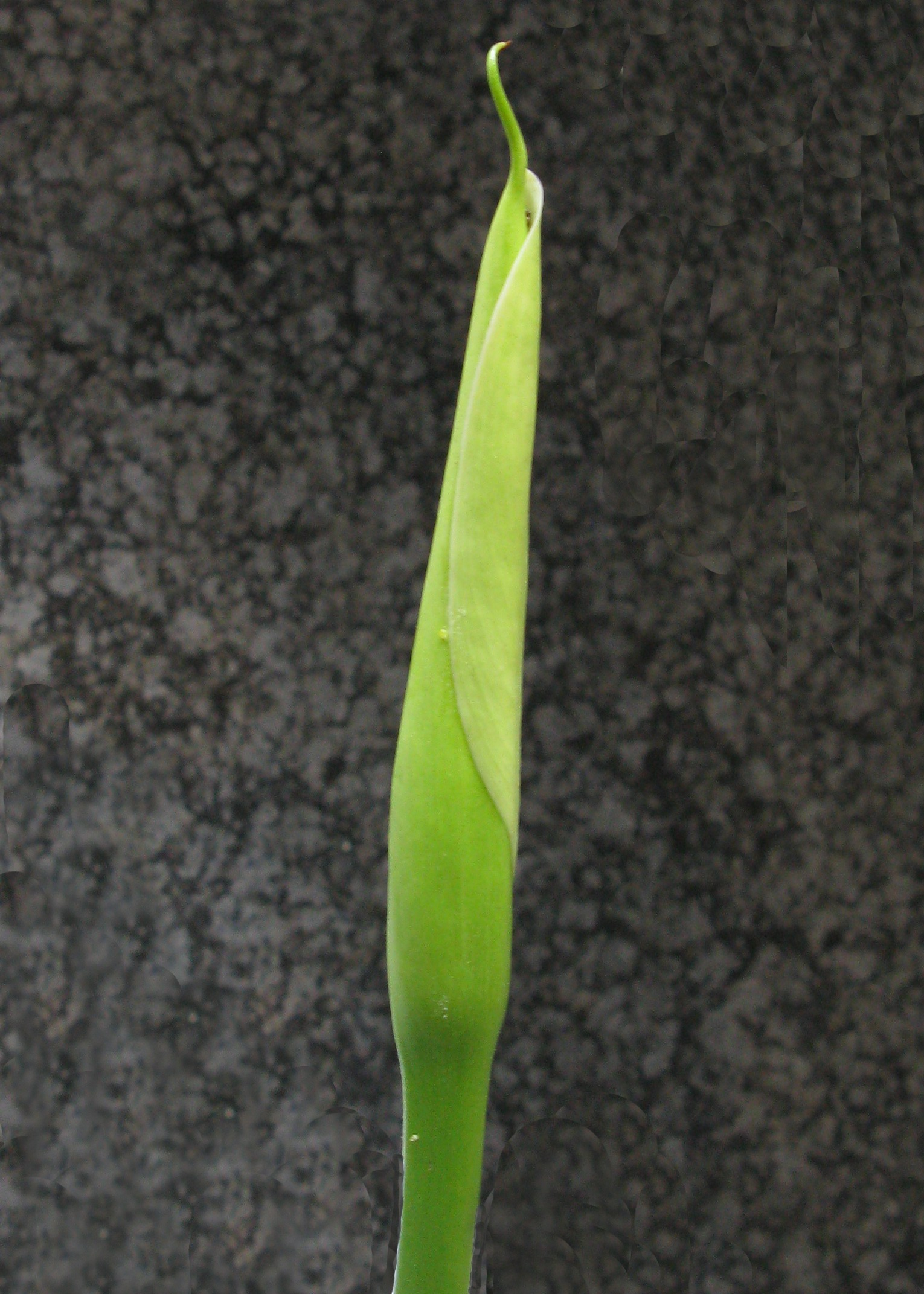
Zantedeschia aethiopica, showing convolute spathe wound around bud

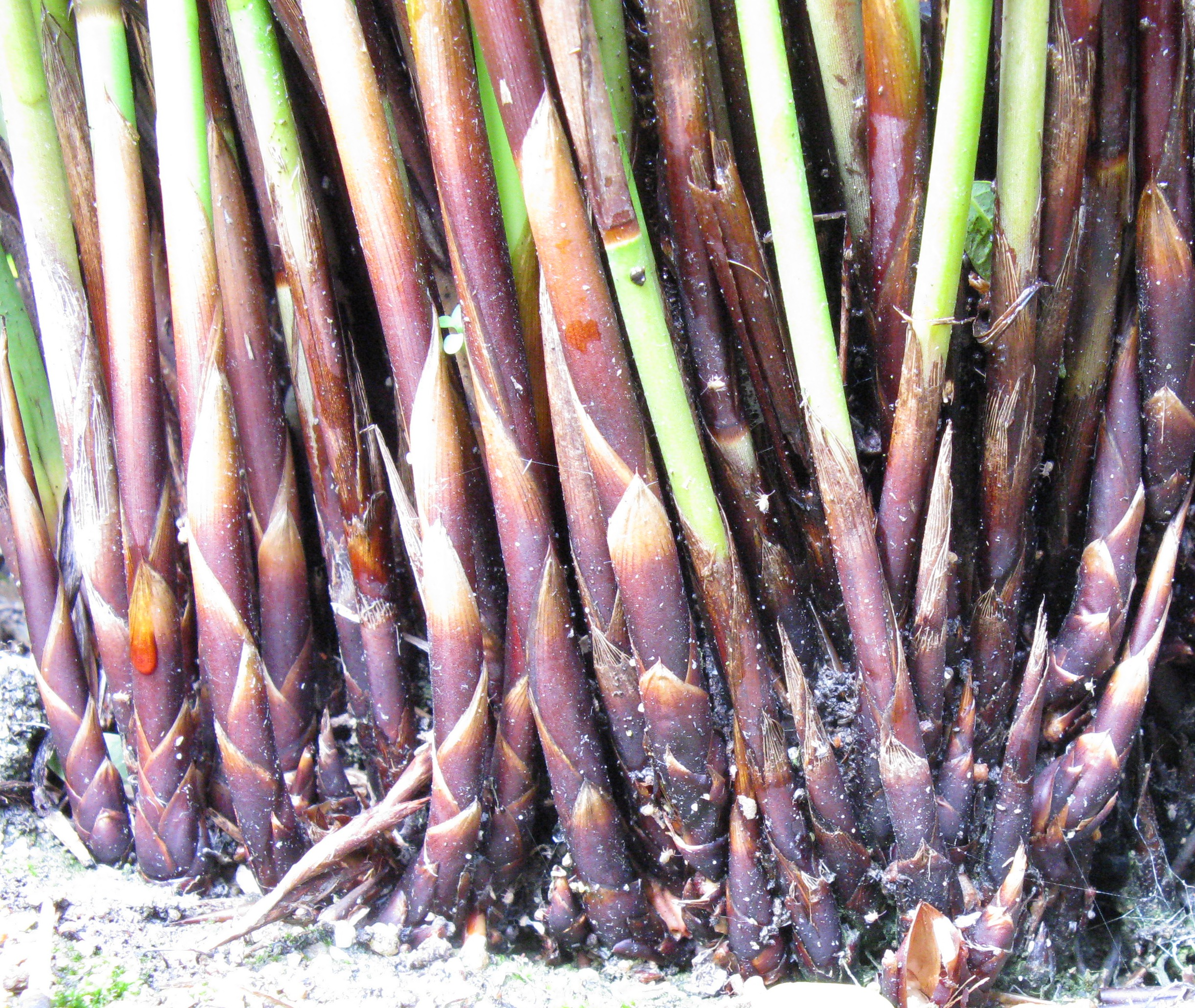
Base of tussock of Thamnochortus species, showing convolute leaf sheaths

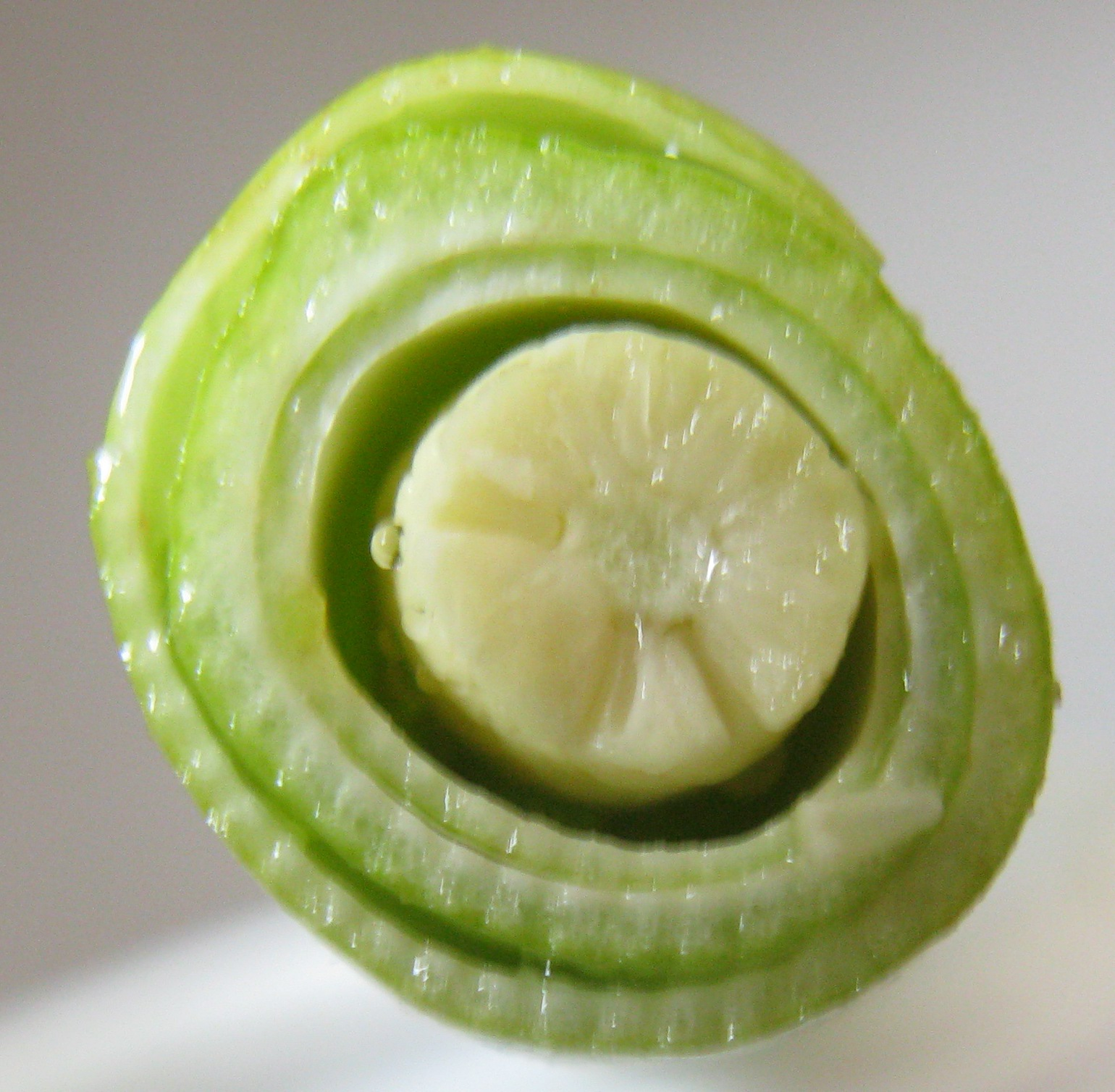
Cross section through budding spadix and convolute spathe of Zantedeschia aethiopica

Convolute as a verb literally means to "roll together" or "roll around", from the Latin convolvere. In general application the word can mean to "tangle" or "complicate", but in botanical descriptions convolute usually is an adjective from the Latin convolutus, meaning "rolled around". It commonly refers to a special class of imbricate structures — those where the overlapping edges of leaves, scales or similar elements are spirally wrapped, each scale having one edge within the previous scale and one outside the next scale. In the family Restionaceae the leaf sheaths commonly are convolute in this sense. However in structures such as a spathe, where there is only one element, a convolute (or "convolutive") element is spirally wrapped around itself or its branch. This is common in the buds of leaves and inflorescences of members of the family Araceae.
