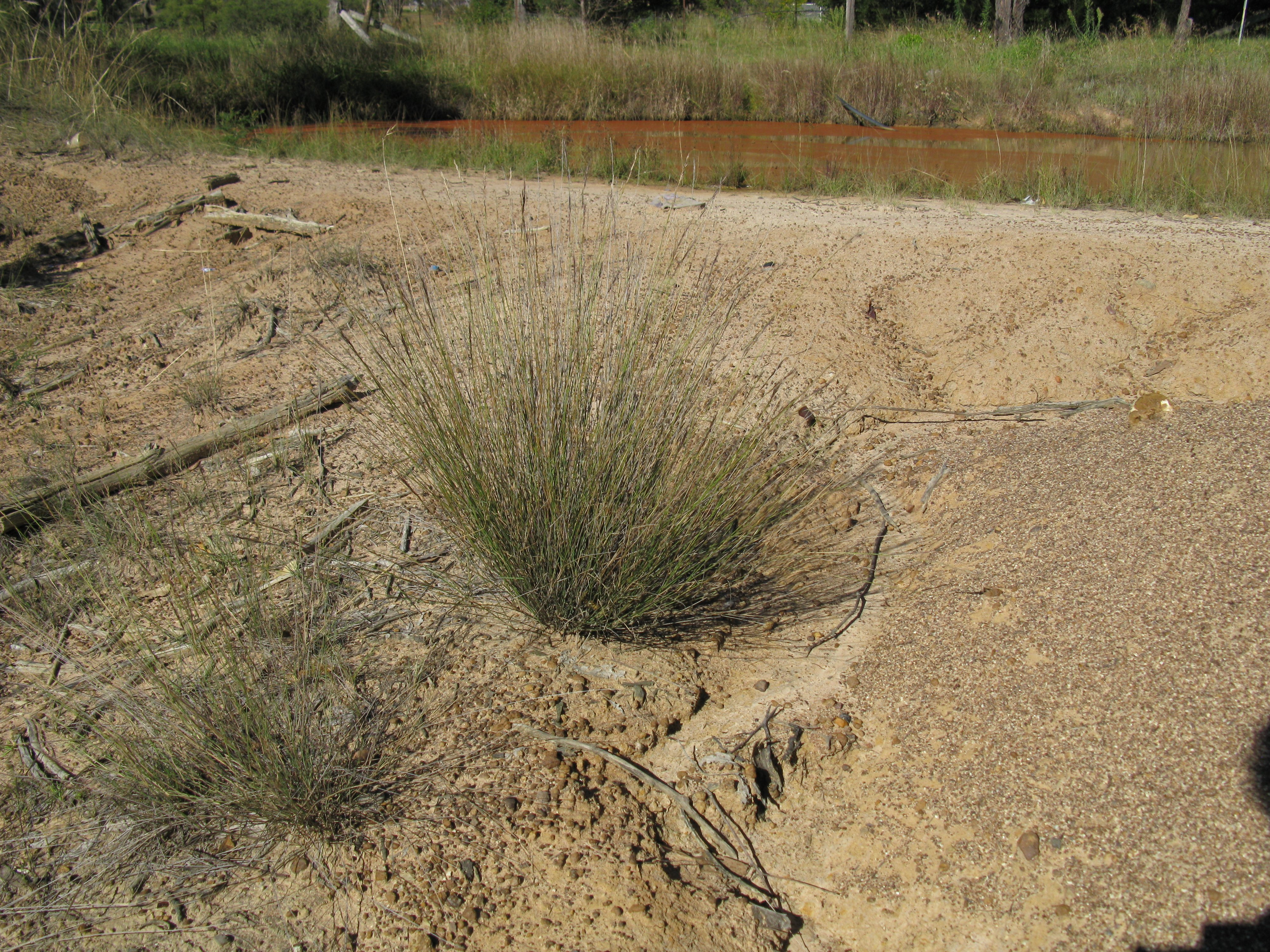

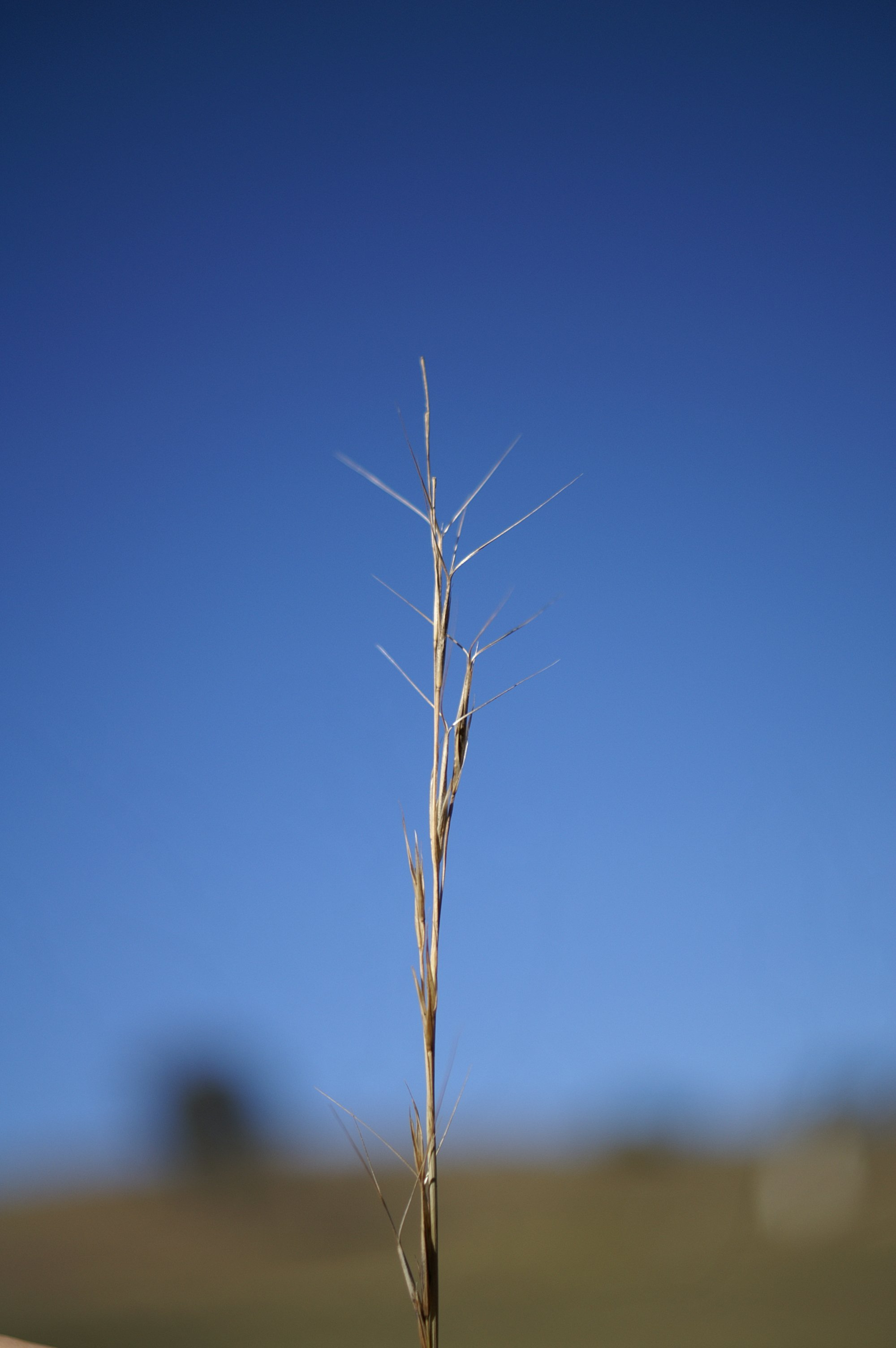

Scientific classification
- Kingdom: Plantae
- Clade: Tracheophytes
- Clade: Angiosperms
- Clade: Monocots
- Clade: Commelinids
- Order: Poales
- Family: Poaceae
- Genus: Aristida
- Species: A. ramosa

Binomial name
- Aristida ramosa R.Br.

= Aristida ramosa =

Species of grass

Aristida ramosa (common name Purple wiregrass) is a species of grass (in the family Poaceae) that occurs in New South Wales, Victoria, Western Australia and Queensland. However, it is thought to have been introduced into Western Australia. It was first described by Robert Brown in 1810 who find it live at Port Jackson (Sydney). The species epithet, ramosa, is a Latin adjective meaning "branched" which describes the plant as bearing branches.

== Description ==
A ramosa is a tufted perennial, with smooth internodes, growing 37–120 cm (15–47 in) high. The inflorescences are 8–27 cm (3.1–10.6 in) long by 1.5–2 cm (0.6–0.8 in) wide. It grows in Bluegrass downs (Dichanthium spp.), Brigalow, Eremophila, Eucalyptus and Triodia communities in varied soils, and flowers and fruits all year round.

== See also ==
- List of Aristida species
