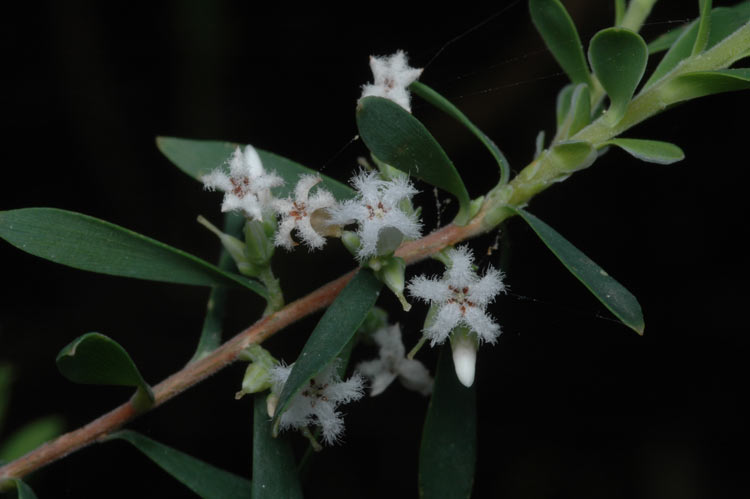
- In the Australian National Botanic Gardens

Scientific classification
- Kingdom: Plantae
- Clade: Tracheophytes
- Clade: Angiosperms
- Clade: Eudicots
- Clade: Asterids
- Order: Ericales
- Family: Ericaceae
- Genus: Styphelia
- Species: S. mutica

Binomial name
- Styphelia mutica (R.Br.) F.Muell.
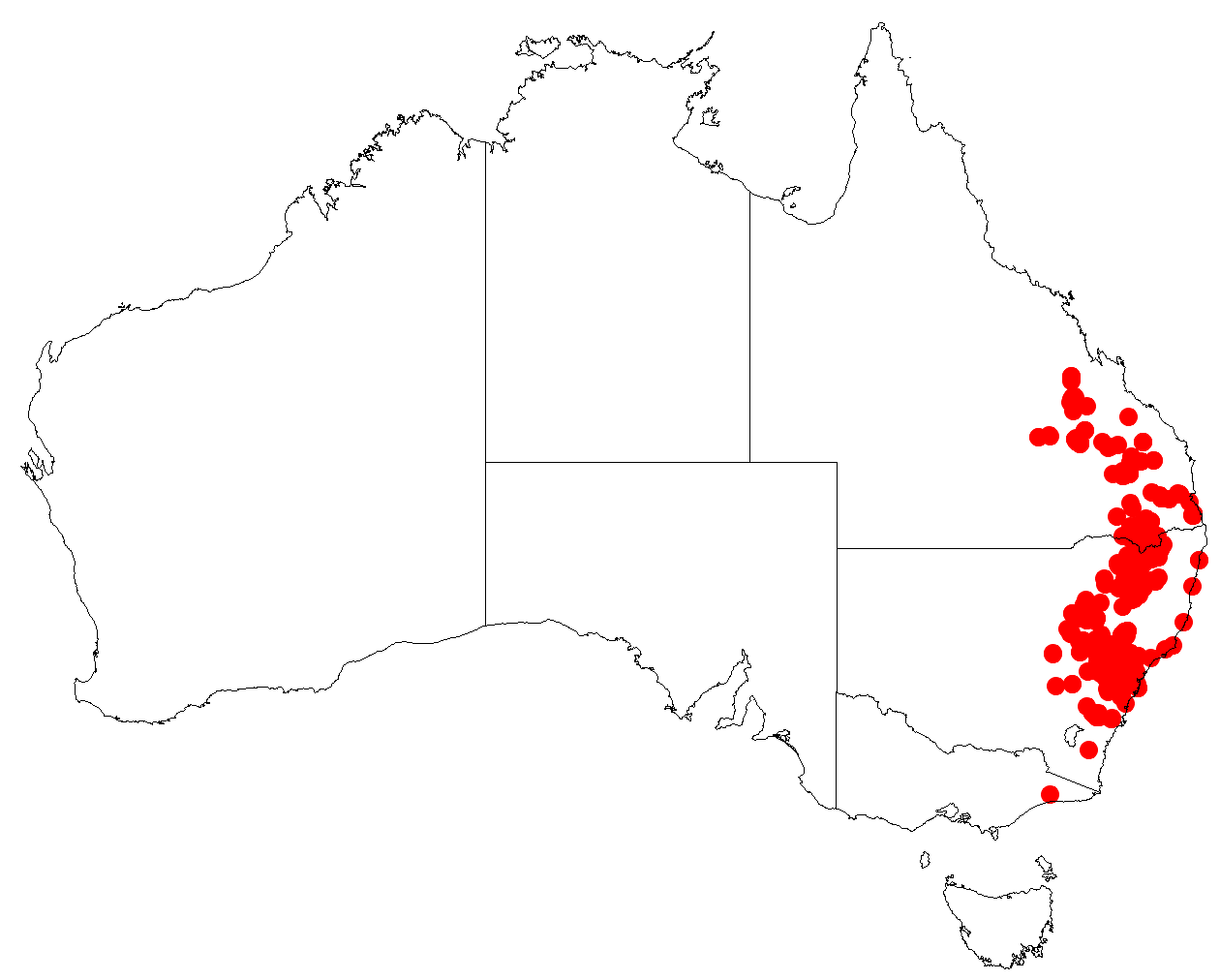
- Occurrence data from AVH

Synonyms
- Leucopogon muticus R.Br.; Leucopogon adpressus Sieber ex DC.; Leucopogon appressus Sieber ex Benth.

= Styphelia mutica =

Species of plant

Styphelia mutica, commonly known as blunt beard-heath, is a species of flowering plant in the heath family Ericaceae and is endemic to eastern Australia. It is an erect, straggling shrub with egg-shaped leaves with the narrower end towards the base, and small numbers of white, tube-shaped flowers that are densely bearded inside.

== Description ==
Styphelia mutica is an erect, straggling shrub that typically grows to a height of up to 1.5 m (4 ft 11 in), and has softly-hairy branchlets. Its leaves are egg-shaped leaves with the narrower end towards the base, 9.6–23 mm (0.38–0.91 in) long and 2.5–5.8 mm (0.098–0.228 in) wide on a petiole 1.5–2.0 mm (0.059–0.079 in) long. The leaves are flat with 3 to 5 parallel veins. The flowers are arranged in spikes of 4 to 10 up to 9 mm (0.35 in) long in leaf axils on a peduncle about 2 mm (0.079 in) long with bracteoles 0.9–1.2 mm (0.035–0.047 in) long at the base. The sepals are 0.9–2.4 mm (0.035–0.094 in) long, the petals joined at the base to form a tube 2.0–2.5 mm (0.079–0.098 in) long with lobes 1.4–2.0 mm (0.055–0.079 in) long and densely bearded inside. Flowering mainly occurs from September to October and the fruit is a bristly, black, elliptic drupe 3.0–4.5 mm (0.12–0.18 in) long.

== Taxonomy ==
This species was first formally described in 1810 by Robert Brown, who gave it the name Leucopogon muticus in his Prodromus Florae Novae Hollandiae et Insulae Van Diemen. In 1867, Ferdinand von Mueller transferred the species to Styphelia as S. mutica. The specific epithet (mutica) means "blunt".

== Distribution and habitat ==
Blunt beard-heath grows in heath and forest on slopes and ridges from sea level to an altitude of 1,000 m (3,300 ft) in south-east Queensland and in eastern New South Wales as far south as Cooma.
