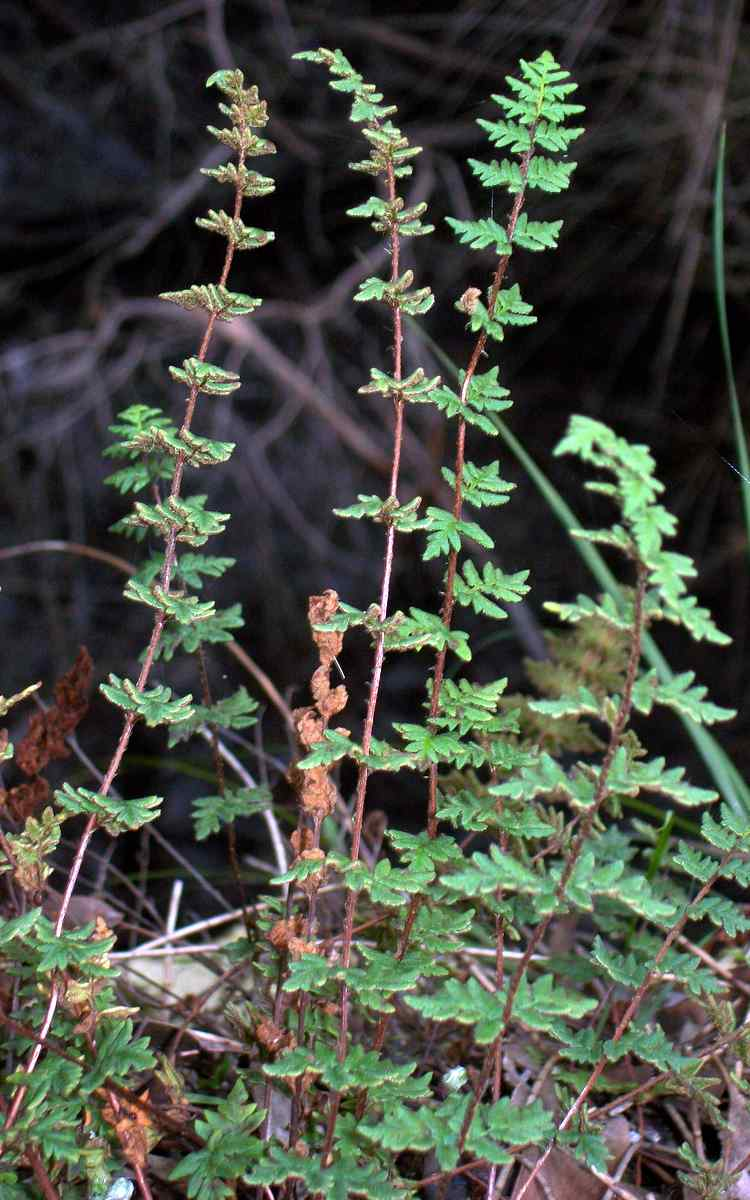
- Rock fern growing by the Lane Cove River, Australia

Scientific classification
- Kingdom: Plantae
- Clade: Tracheophytes
- Division: Polypodiophyta
- Class: Polypodiopsida
- Order: Polypodiales
- Family: Pteridaceae
- Genus: Cheilanthes
- Species: C. sieberi

Binomial name
- Cheilanthes sieberi (Kunze)

Synonyms
- Cheilanthes erecta Colenso; Cheilanthes preissiana Kunze; Cheilanthes sieberi Kunze; Cheilanthes tenuifolia subsp. sieberi (Kunze) Domin; Hemionitis sieberi (Kunze) Christenh.

= Cheilanthes sieberi =

Species of fern

Cheilanthes sieberi is a small fern growing in many parts of Australia, New Zealand and nearby islands. Common names include poison rock fern and mulga fern.

This fern may grow up to 25 centimetres (10 inches) tall. It is a widespread plant, seen in a variety of different habitats: it occurs in arid areas as well as sites with over 1500 mm of annual average rainfall. In desert areas it grows in shaded rocky gullies. However, near the coast, it can grow in full sun in cracks of rocks, or in thin soils.

== Consumption by stock ==
Excessive consumption of this fern can cause health issues for sheep and cattle.
