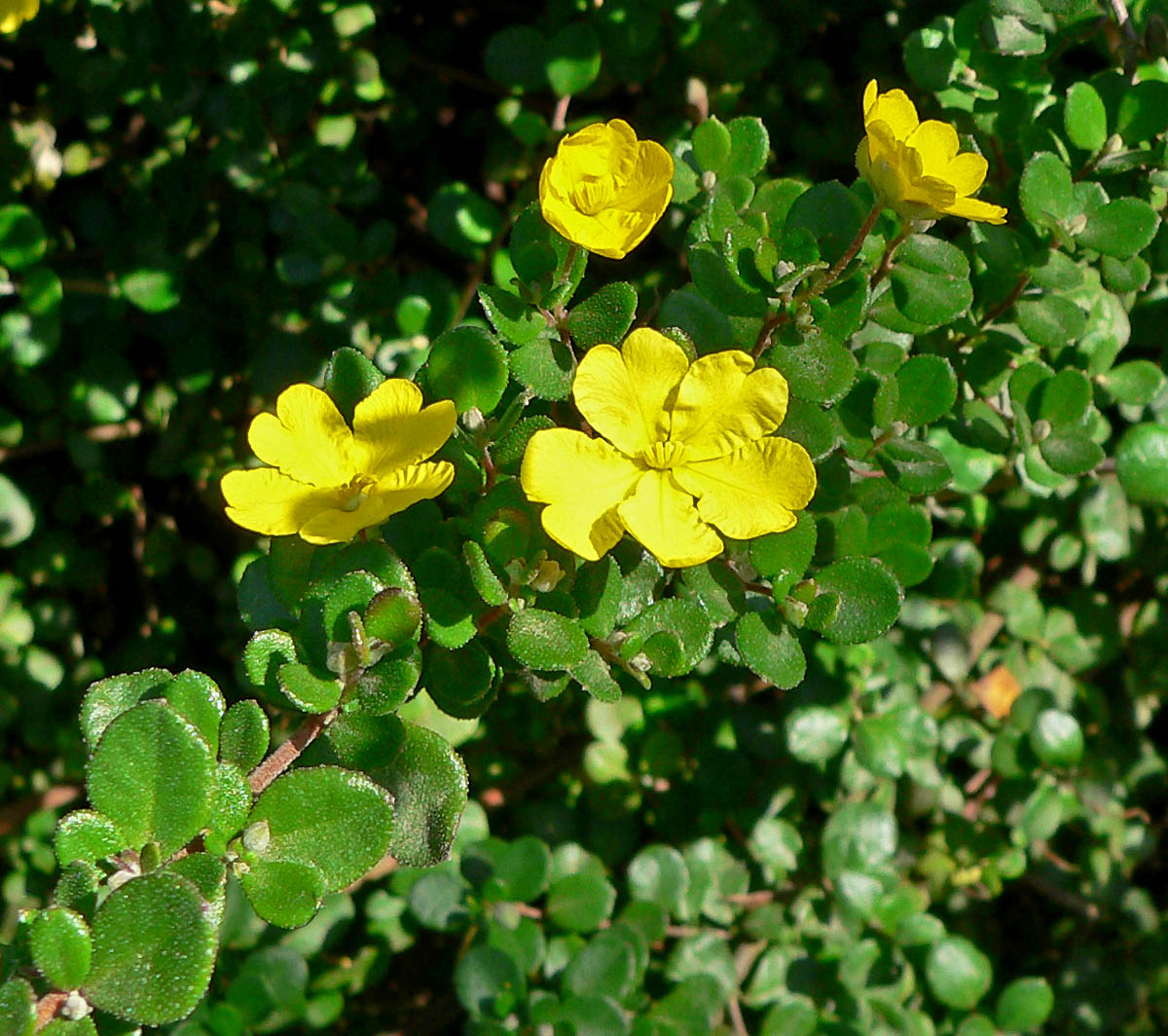

Scientific classification
- Kingdom: Plantae
- Clade: Tracheophytes
- Clade: Angiosperms
- Clade: Eudicots
- Order: Dilleniales
- Family: Dilleniaceae
- Genus: Hibbertia
- Species: H. aspera

Binomial name
- Hibbertia aspera DC.

= Hibbertia aspera =

Rough guinea flower

Species of flowering plant

Hibbertia aspera, commonly known as rough guinea flower, is a species of flowering plant in the family Dilleniaceae and is endemic to eastern Australia. It is an ascending or erect shrub with low-lying or scrambling branches, oblong to lance-shaped or egg-shaped leaves with the narrower end towards the base, and yellow flowers with four to six stamens in a single group, joined at the base.

== Description ==
Hibbertia aspera is an ascending or erect shrub up to 60 cm (24 in) high with low-lying or scrambling branches 0.3–1 m (1 ft 0 in – 3 ft 3 in) long. The leaves are oblong to lance-shaped or egg-shaped with the narrower end towards the base, 5–13 mm (0.20–0.51 in) long, 2–5.5 mm (0.079–0.217 in) long and sessile or on a petiole up to 0.8 mm (0.031 in) long. The flowers are arranged singly, sometimes in groups of two or three, on the ends of short side branches, on peduncles 2–5 mm (0.079–0.197 in) long with a linear bract 1.2–1.5 mm (0.047–0.059 in) long. The five sepals are oblong to egg-shaped, 3–4 mm (0.12–0.16 in) long, the inner lobes slightly longer than the outer ones. The petals are yellow, 3.4–5 mm (0.13–0.20 in) long and there are four to six stamens joined at their lower half, in a single group. There are two carpels each containing two ovules. Flowering mainly occurs from September to December.

== Taxonomy ==
Hibbertia aspera was first formally described in 1817 by Swiss botanist Augustin Pyramus de Candolle in Regni Vegetabilis Systema Naturale from specimens collected by George Caley. The specific epithet (aspera) means "rough to the touch".

In 1998, Hellmut R. Toelken described two subspecies in the Journal of the Adelaide Botanic Gardens, and the names are accepted by the Australian Plant Census:

- H. aspera DC. subsp. aspera;
- H.aspera subsp. pilosifolia Toelken has star-like hairs with fewer branches than those on the autonym. The type specimen of this subspecies was collected on the Atherton Tablelands.

== Distribution and habitat ==
Rough guinea flower grows on sandy or gravelly soils in woodland, open forest and heath in Queensland, New South Wales and Victoria. In New South Wales it mainly occurs in coastal areas and in Victoria is restricted to Gippsland. Subspecies pilosifolia does not occur in Victoria.
