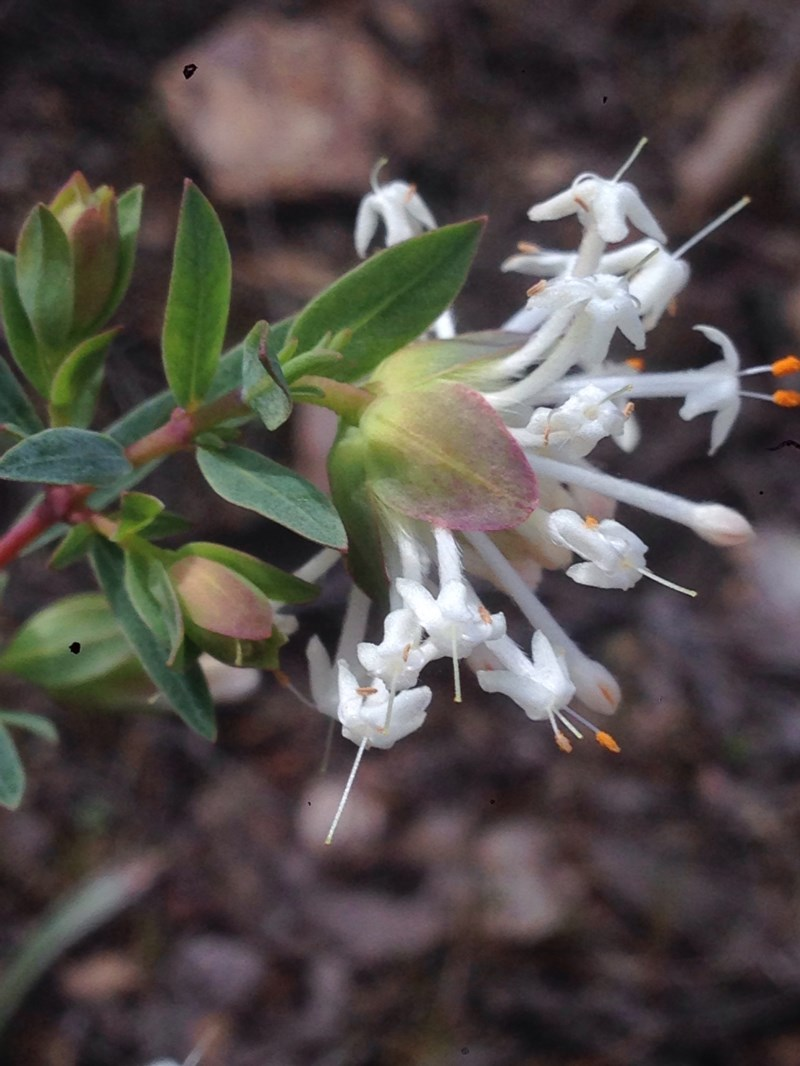
- Pimelea linifolia growing near Burra

Scientific classification
- Kingdom: Plantae
- Clade: Tracheophytes
- Clade: Angiosperms
- Clade: Eudicots
- Clade: Rosids
- Order: Malvales
- Family: Thymelaeaceae
- Genus: Pimelea
- Species: P. linifolia

Binomial name
- Pimelea linifolia Sm.

= Pimelea linifolia =

Slender rice flower

Species of plant

Pimelea linifolia, commonly known as slender rice flower is a common, variable shrub widespread throughout eastern Australia. It has narrow leaves arranged in opposite pairs, and usually white flowers arranged in heads of seven or more on the ends of the stems, with four lance-shaped bracts at the base of the inflorescence. The plant may be toxic to livestock.

== Description ==
Pimelea linifolia is a variable shrub, sometimes prostrate, sometimes growing to a height of 1.5 m (4 ft 11 in), with glabrous stems. The leaves are glabrous, narrow egg-shaped to elliptic, 3–40 mm (0.12–1.57 in) long and 1–9 mm (0.039–0.354 in) wide. The flowers are white, sometimes pink, mostly 10–20 mm (0.39–0.79 in) long. They are arranged in heads of between seven and sixty on the ends of the stems, with four, sometimes eight bracts at the base. Some flowers are bisexual and others are female, the female flowers shorter. The bracts are sessile, lance-shaped to egg-shaped, 7–17 mm (0.28–0.67 in) long and 3–11 mm (0.12–0.43 in) wide. The fruit is green and 3–5 mm (0.12–0.20 in) long.

== Taxonomy and naming ==
Pimelea linifolia was first formally described in 1793 by James Edward Smith from a specimen that "flowered in the greenhouse of Lord Viscount Lewisham in February 1794". The specific epithet (linifolia) strictly means "thread-like leaf" but is also used for "linear leaf".

== Distribution and habitat ==
Slender rice flower is widespread and common in eastern Australia. It usually grows in wet forest, sometimes on the margin of rainforest. It occurs from north-east Queensland, through the eastern half of New South Wales, all but the far north-west of Victoria, the south-east of South Australia and throughout Tasmania.

== Ecology ==
This plant is suspected of being poisonous to sheep, but the evidence is inconclusive.

== Uses ==
The bark of P. linifolia can be processed into fine strong thread for catching the bogong moth. This string, called a 'Bushman's bootlace', is produced by a traditional method that involves wetting, drying, beating and rolling the material.
