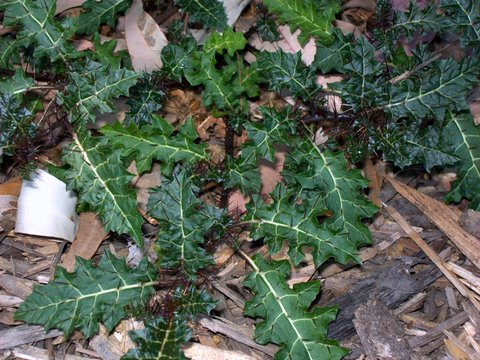
- Forest Nightshade at Eastwood, Australia

Scientific classification
- Kingdom: Plantae
- Clade: Tracheophytes
- Clade: Angiosperms
- Clade: Eudicots
- Clade: Asterids
- Order: Solanales
- Family: Solanaceae
- Genus: Solanum
- Species: S. prinophyllum

Binomial name
- Solanum prinophyllum Dunal

Synonyms
- Solanum armatum R.Br.

= Solanum prinophyllum =

Forest nightshade

Species of herb

Solanum prinophyllum, known as the forest nightshade or Grin Whiskers, is a accepted species of small plant native to the east coast of East Victoria to Southeast Queensland, Australia. S. prinophyllum is a short lived herb, annual or perennial.

== Description ==
Forest nightshade grows up to 50 cm high. Its leaves are 5 to 8 cm long and 3 to 5 cm wide. They are spiky and often tinged with purple. The stems are also spiky. Five petalled flowers occur at any time of the year and are blue or lilac in colour. Petals are fused at the base. The fruit is around 15 to 20 mm in diameter and the stem is 10 to 20 mm long. The fruit is a berry, which stays green or turns purple. The habitat is moist areas, in sclerophyll forest, or disturbed areas in rainforest.
