= List of Aristida species =

Aristida is a large, broadly distributed genus of flowering plants in the grass family, Poaceae. As of November 2025, there are around 301 accepted species in Kew's Plants of the World Online.

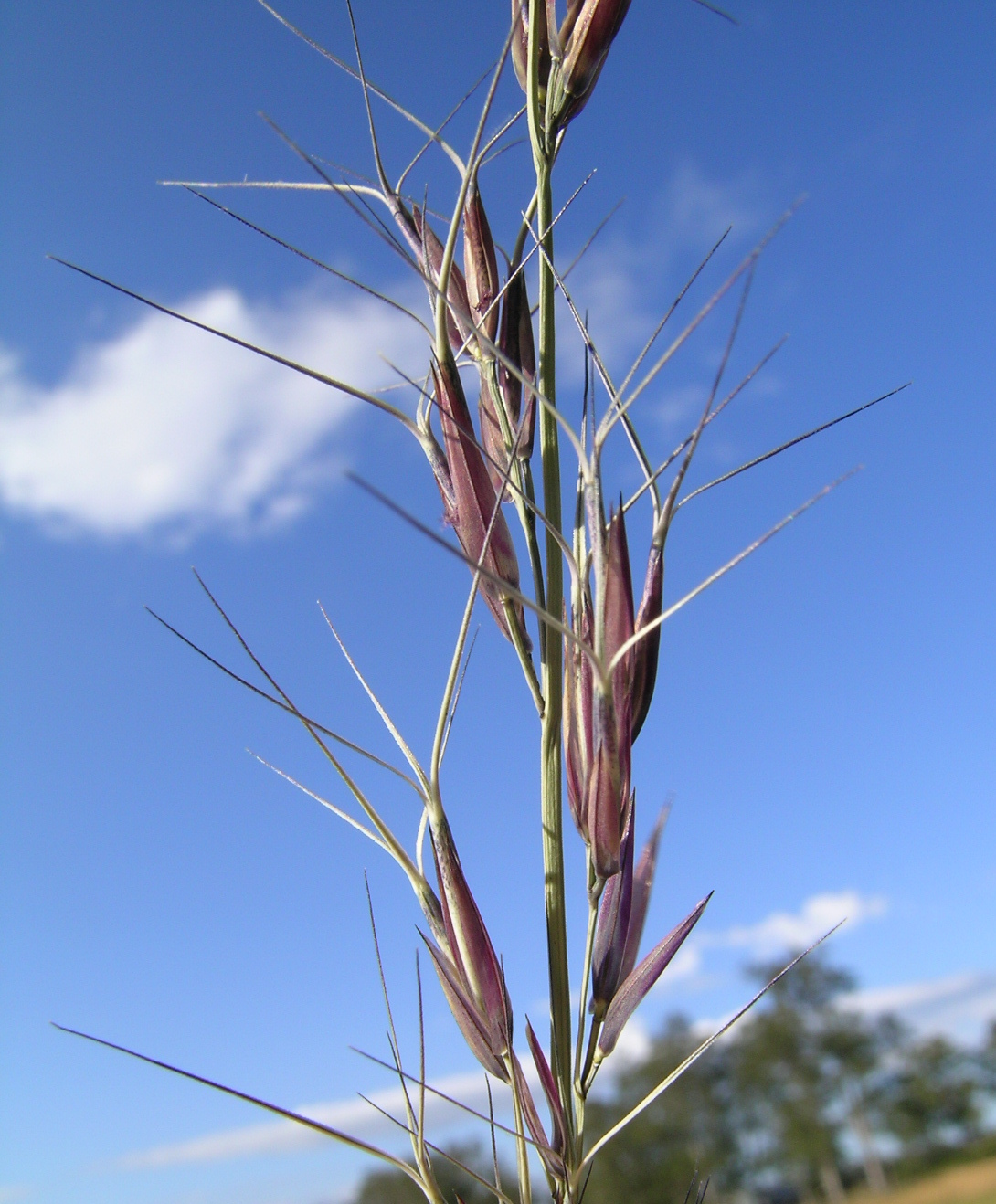
Aristida acuta

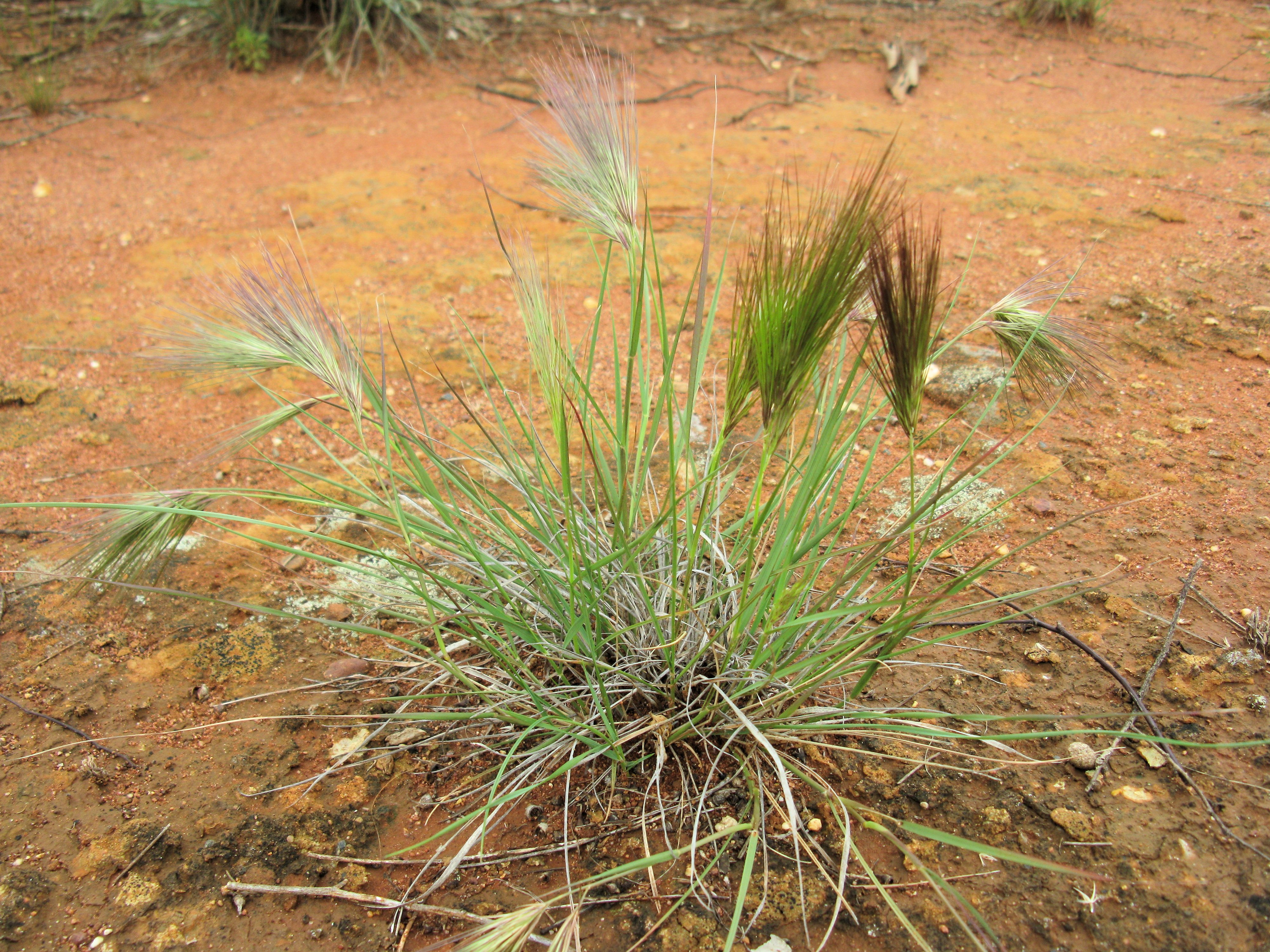
Aristida behriana

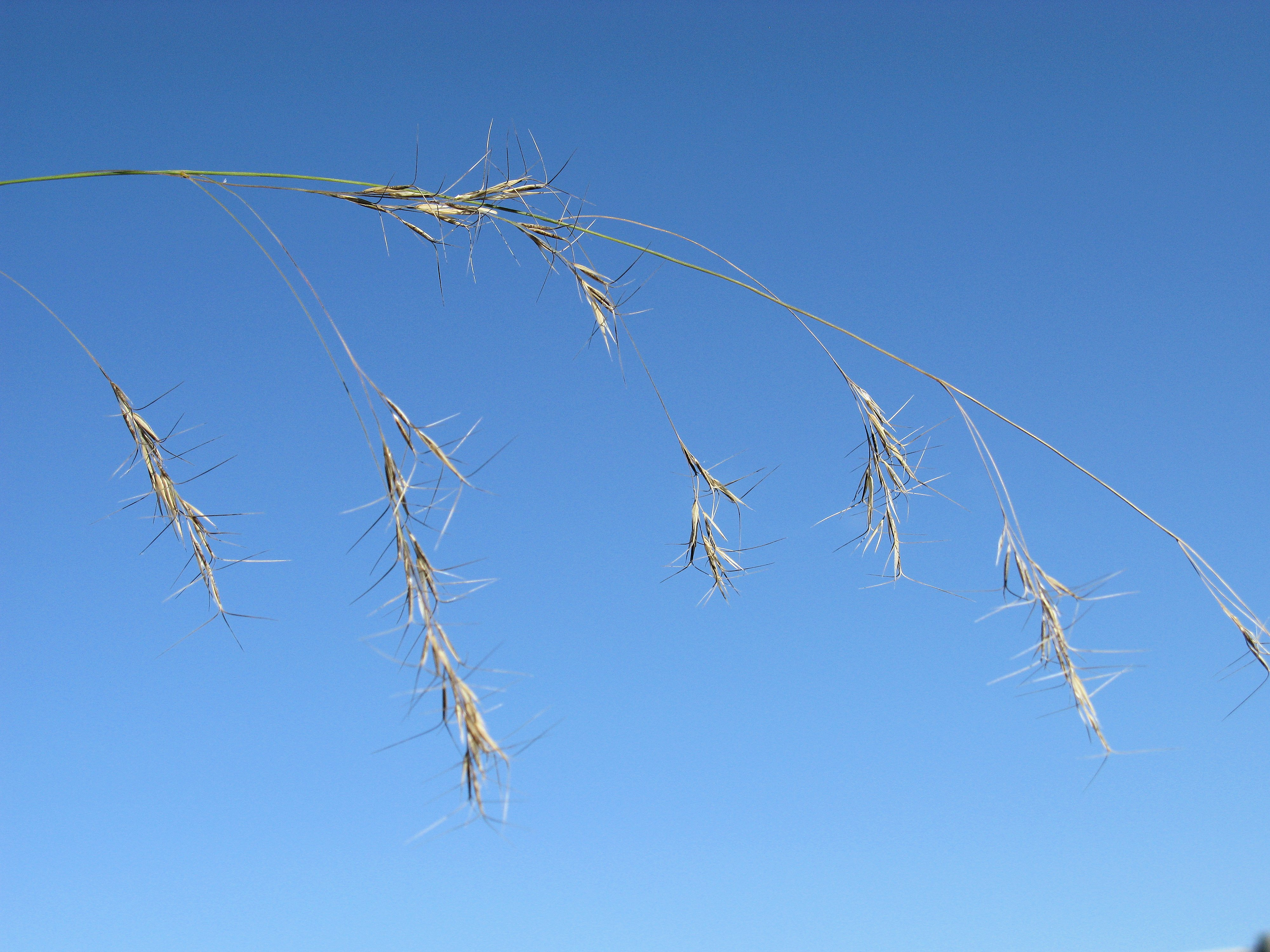
Aristida benthamii

- Aristida abnormis Chiov.
- Aristida achalensis Mez
- Aristida acuta S.T.Blake
- Aristida adoensis Hochst. ex A.Rich.
- Aristida adscensionis L.
- Aristida aemulans Melderis
- Aristida aequiglumis Hack.
- Aristida alpina L.Liu
- Aristida amazonensis Longhi-Wagner
- Aristida ambongensis A.Camus
- Aristida amplexifolia E.A.Sánchez
- Aristida anaclasta Cope
- Aristida anisochaeta Clayton
- Aristida annamensis Henrard
- Aristida annua B.K.Simon
- Aristida anthoxanthoides (Domin) Henrard
- Aristida antoniana Steud. ex Döll
- Aristida appressa Vasey
- Aristida arida B.K.Simon
- Aristida arizonica Vasey
- Aristida arubensis Henrard
- Aristida asplundii Henrard
- Aristida australis B.K.Simon
- Aristida balansae Henrard
- Aristida barbicollis Trin. & Rupr.
- Aristida basiramea Vasey
- Aristida batangensis Z.X.Tang & H.X.Liu
- Aristida behriana F.Muell.
- Aristida benthamii Henrard
- Aristida beyrichiana Trin. & Rupr.
- Aristida biglandulosa J.M.Black
- Aristida bipartita (Nees) Trin. & Rupr.
- Aristida bissei Catasús
- Aristida blakei B.K.Simon
- Aristida boninensis Ohwi & Tuyama
- Aristida brainii Melderis
- Aristida brasiliensis Longhi-Wagner
- Aristida brevissima L.Liu
- Aristida brittonorum Hitchc.
- Aristida burbidgeae B.K.Simon
- Aristida burraensis B.K.Simon
- Aristida calcicola Hitchc. & Ekman
- Aristida californica Thurb.
- Aristida calycina R.Br.
- Aristida capillacea Lam.
- Aristida capillifolia Henrard
- Aristida caput-medusae Domin
- Aristida chapadensis Trin.
- Aristida chaseae Hitchc.
- Aristida chiclayensis Tovar
- Aristida chinensis Munro
- Aristida circinalis Lindm.
- Aristida cognata Trin. & Rupr.
- Aristida condensata Chapm.
- Aristida condylifolia Caro
- Aristida congesta Roem. & Schult.
- Aristida constricta Longhi-Wagner
- Aristida contorta F.Muell.
- Aristida correlliae P.M.McKenzie, Urbatsch & Proctor
- Aristida culionensis Pilger ex Perkins
- Aristida cumingiana Trin. & Rupr.
- Aristida curtifolia Hitchc.
- Aristida curtissii (A.Gray) Nash
- Aristida curvifolia E.Fourn.
- Aristida cyanantha Steud.
- Aristida dasydesmis Mez
- Aristida decaryana A.Camus
- Aristida denudata Pilg.
- Aristida desmantha Trin. & Rupr.
- Aristida dewinteri Giess
- Aristida dichotoma Michx.
- Aristida diffusa Trin.
- Aristida diminuta (Mez) C.E.Hubb.
- Aristida divaricata Humb. & Bonpl. ex Willd.
- Aristida divulsa Andersson
- Aristida dominii B.K.Simon
- Aristida echinata Henrard
- Aristida echinulata Roseng. & Izag.
- Aristida ecuadoriensis Henrard
- Aristida effusa Henrard
- Aristida ekmaniana Henrard
- Aristida elliptica (Nees) Kunth
- Aristida eludens Allred & Valdés-Reyna
- Aristida engleri Mez
- Aristida erecta Hitchc.
- Aristida exserta S.T.Blake
- Aristida fendleriana Steud.
- Aristida ferrilateris S.M.Phillips
- Aristida filifolia (Arechav.) Herter
- Aristida flabellata Caro
- Aristida flaccida Trin. & Rupr.
- Aristida floridana (Chapm.) Vasey
- Aristida forsteri B.K.Simon
- Aristida fragilis Hitchc. & Ekman
- Aristida fredscholzii H.Scholz & Kürschner
- Aristida friesii Hack. ex Henrard
- Aristida funiculata Trin. & Rupr.
- Aristida geminiflora E.Fourn.
- Aristida gibbosa (Nees) Kunth
- Aristida glabrata (Vasey) Hitchc.
- Aristida glauca (Nees) Walp.
- Aristida glaziovii Hack. ex Henrard
- Aristida gracilipes (Domin) Henrard
- Aristida granitica B.K.Simon
- Aristida guayllabambensis Laegaard
- Aristida gypsophila Beetle
- Aristida gyrans Chapm.
- Aristida hackelii Arechav.
- Aristida hamulosa Henrard
- Aristida hassleri Hack.
- Aristida havardii Vasey
- Aristida helicophylla S.T.Blake
- Aristida helleriana M.Marchi, Muj.-Sall. & R.L.Barbieri
- Aristida hintonii Hitchc.
- Aristida hispidula Henrard
- Aristida hitchcockiana Henrard
- Aristida holathera Domin
- Aristida hordeacea Kunth
- Aristida hubbardiana Schweick.
- Aristida humbertii Bourreil
- Aristida humidicola S.M.Phillips
- Aristida hygrometrica R.Br.
- Aristida hystricula Edgew.
- Aristida hystrix L.f.
- Aristida inaequiglumis Domin
- Aristida ingrata Domin
- Aristida jacobsiana B.K.Simon & Cowie
- Aristida jaliscana R.Guzmán & V.Jaram.
- Aristida jaucense Catasús
- Aristida jerichoensis (Domin) Henrard
- Aristida jorullensis Kunth
- Aristida jubata (Arechav.) Herter
- Aristida junciformis Trin. & Rupr.
- Aristida kelleri Hack.
- Aristida kenyensis Henrard
- Aristida kerstingii Pilg.
- Aristida kimberleyensis B.K.Simon
- Aristida kunthiana Trin. & Rupr.
- Aristida laevigata Hitchc. & Ekman
- Aristida laevis (Nees) Kunth
- Aristida lanigera Longhi-Wagner
- Aristida lanosa Muhl. ex Elliott
- Aristida latifolia Domin (feathertop wiregrass)
- Aristida latzii B.K.Simon
- Aristida laxa Cav.
- Aristida lazaridis B.K.Simon
- Aristida leichhardtiana Domin
- Aristida leptopoda Benth.
- Aristida leptura Cope
- Aristida leucophaea Henrard
- Aristida liebmannii E.Fourn.
- Aristida lignosa B.K.Simon
- Aristida lisowskii Richel
- Aristida longespica Poir.
- Aristida longicollis (Domin) Henrard
- Aristida longifolia Trin.
- Aristida longiseta Steud.
- Aristida macrantha Hack.
- Aristida macroclada Henrard
- Aristida macrophylla Hack.
- Aristida mandoniana Henrard
- Aristida megapotamica Spreng.
- Aristida mendocina Phil.
- Aristida meraukensis Henrard
- Aristida meridionalis Henrard
- Aristida mexicana Scribn. ex Henrard
- Aristida migiurtina Chiov.
- Aristida minutiflora Caro
- Aristida mohrii Nash
- Aristida mollissima Pilg.
- Aristida monticola Henrard
- Aristida moritzii Henrard
- Aristida multiramea Hack.
- Aristida muricata Henrard
- Aristida murina Cav.
- Aristida mutabilis Trin. & Rupr.
- Aristida neglecta León ex Hitchc.
- Aristida nemorivaga Henrard
- Aristida nicorae Sulekic
- Aristida niederleinii Mez
- Aristida nitidula (Henrard) S.T.Blake
- Aristida novae-caledoniae Henrard
- Aristida obscura Henrard
- Aristida oligantha Michx.
- Aristida oligospira (Hack.) Henrard
- Aristida pallens Cav.
- Aristida palustris (Chapm.) Vasey
- Aristida pansa Wooton & Standl.
- Aristida paoliana (Chiov.) Henrard
- Aristida papuana Veldkamp
- Aristida parodii Henrard
- Aristida parvula (Nees) De Winter
- Aristida patula Chapm. ex Nash
- Aristida pedroensis Henrard
- Aristida pendula Longhi-Wagner
- Aristida pennei Chiov.
- Aristida perniciosa Domin
- Aristida personata Henrard
- Aristida petersonii Allred & Valdés-Reyna
- Aristida pilgeri Henrard
- Aristida pilosa Labill.
- Aristida pinifolia Catasús
- Aristida pittieri Henrard
- Aristida platychaeta S.T.Blake
- Aristida polyclados Domin
- Aristida portoricensis Pilg.
- Aristida pradana León
- Aristida protensa Henrard
- Aristida pruinosa Domin
- Aristida psammophila Henrard
- Aristida pseudochiclayensis Gut.Peralta & R.Castañeda
- Aristida pubescens E.A.Sánchez
- Aristida purpurascens Poir.
- Aristida purpurea Nutt.
- Aristida purpusiana Hitchc.
- Aristida pycnostachya Cope
- Aristida queenslandica Henrard
- Aristida ramosa R.Br.
- Aristida ramosissima Engelm. ex A.Gray
- Aristida recta Franch.
- Aristida recurvata Kunth
- Aristida redacta Stapf
- Aristida refracta Griseb.
- Aristida repens Trin.
- Aristida rhiniochloa Hochst.
- Aristida rhizomophora Swallen
- Aristida riograndensis B.M.A.Severo & I.I.Boldrini
- Aristida riparia Trin.
- Aristida rosei Hitchc.
- Aristida rufescens Steud.
- Aristida sanctae-luciae Trin.
- Aristida sandinensis Catasús
- Aristida sayapensis Caro
- Aristida scabrescens L.Liu
- Aristida scabrivalvis Hack.
- Aristida schebehliensis Henrard
- Aristida schiedeana Trin. & Rupr.
- Aristida schultzii Mez
- Aristida sciuroides Domin
- Aristida sciurus Stapf
- Aristida scribneriana Hitchc.
- Aristida setacea Retz.
- Aristida setifolia Kunth
- Aristida sieberiana Trin.
- Aristida similis Steud.
- Aristida simpliciflora Chapm.
- Aristida somalensis Stapf
- Aristida spanospicula Allred & Valdés-Reyna & Sánchez-Ken
- Aristida spectabilis Hack.
- Aristida spegazzinii Arechav.
- Aristida spiciformis Elliott
- Aristida spuria Domin
- Aristida stenophylla Henrard
- Aristida stenostachya Clayton
- Aristida stipitata Hack.
- Aristida stipoides Lam.
- Aristida stocksii (Hook.f.) Domin
- Aristida stricta Michx.
- Aristida strigosa (Henrard) S.T.Blake
- Aristida subaequans Döll
- Aristida subspicata Trin. & Rupr.
- Aristida subulata Henrard
- Aristida superpendens Domin
- Aristida suringarii Henrard
- Aristida takeoi Ohwi
- Aristida tarapotana Mez
- Aristida tenuifolia Hitchc.
- Aristida tenuiseta Cope
- Aristida tenuissima A.Camus
- Aristida teretifolia Arechav.
- Aristida ternipes Cav.
- Aristida thompsonii B.K.Simon
- Aristida torta (Nees) Kunth
- Aristida trachyantha Henrard
- Aristida transvaalensis Henrard
- Aristida tricornis H.Scholz & P.König
- Aristida triseta Keng
- Aristida triticoides Henrard
- Aristida tsangpoensis L.Liu
- Aristida tuberculosa Nutt.
- Aristida tuitensis Sánchez-Ken & Dávila
- Aristida uruguayensis Henrard
- Aristida utilis F.M.Bailey
- Aristida vagans Cav.
- Aristida vaginata Hitchc.
- Aristida valida Henrard
- Aristida venesuelae Henrard
- Aristida venustula Arechav.
- Aristida vestita Thunb.
- Aristida vexativa Henrard
- Aristida vickeryae B.K.Simon
- Aristida victoriana Sulekic
- Aristida vilfifolia Henrard
- Aristida villosa B.L.Rob. & Greenm.
- Aristida virgata Trin.
- Aristida warburgii Mez
- Aristida wildii Melderis
- Aristida wrightii Nash
