= Wiregrass =

Wiregrass is a common name for several plants.

Wiregrass may refer to:

- Poaceae grasses
  - Aristida (three-awns), especially Aristida stricta (Pineland Three-awn), Aristida junciformis and Aristida purpurea (Purple Three-awn), of subfamily Arundinoideae
  - Eleusine indica (Indian Goosegrass) of subfamily Eragrostideae
  - Sporobolus indicus (Smutgrass) of subfamily Chloridoideae
  - Cynodon dactylon (Bermuda Grass) of subfamily Chloridoideae
  - Ventenata dubia of subfamily Pooideae, native to the Mediterranean and naturalized in western North America
- Other plants
  - Juncus tenuis (Slender Rush) of the rush family
  - Polygonum arenastrum (Common Knotweed) of the knotweed family

== See also ==
- Wiregrass Region, an area of the Southern United States encompassing parts of southern Georgia, southeastern Alabama and the Florida Panhandle, and named for its abundance of Aristida stricta
