= Needlegrass =

The term needlegrass may refer to any of several genera of grasses, including:

- Achnatherum
- Aristida (three-awns)
- Hesperostipa
- Nassella
- Stipa
- Triraphis

== See also ==
- Spear grass (disambiguation)
- Wiregrass (disambiguation)
