= Aristida lanosa =

Scientific classification
- Kingdom: Plantae
- Clade: Tracheophytes
- Clade: Angiosperms
- Clade: Monocots
- Clade: Commelinids
- Order: Poales
- Family: Poaceae
- Genus: Aristida
- Species: A. lanosa

Binomial name
- Aristida lanosa Muhl. ex Elliott

Species of perennial grass

Aristida lanosa, also known as woollysheath threeawn, is a perennial grass found along the United States' eastern coast stretching into the southeastern region. It is listed as endangered in the state of New Jersey and is considered imperiled in Arkansas.

The stems of Aristida lanosa range in height from 0.7 to 1.2 m (2 ft 4 in to 3 ft 11 in) . The leaves grow up to 40 cm (16 in) in length and 0.5 mm (0.020 in) in width. Panicles are brown in color, with a length ranging between 30 and 45 cm (12 and 18 in). It flowers from August to October.

Aristida lanosa's range extends from New Jersey to northern Florida, and westward to Texas. The species is abundant in dry soils, and is also found in wet to well-drained loam. It has been observed in habitats such as upland longleaf pine communities and pine plantations, and is more common in communities that have previously experienced a fire regime.

It is considered to be an indicator species for woodland communities in Northern Florida.
