= Aristida rhizomophora =

Conservation status
- Apparently Secure (NatureServe)

Scientific classification
- Kingdom: Plantae
- Clade: Tracheophytes
- Clade: Angiosperms
- Clade: Monocots
- Clade: Commelinids
- Order: Poales
- Family: Poaceae
- Genus: Aristida
- Species: A. rhizomophora

Binomial name
- Aristida rhizomophora Swallen

Species of grass

Aristida rhizomophora is a species of grass known by the common name Florida threeawn. It is endemic to Florida in the United States.

This perennial grass grows from a thick, scaly rhizome. It can form a thick sod. The unbranched stems reach 80 centimeters to one meter in height. They are erect and mostly leafless, with most of the leaves at the bases. The leaves are up to 55 centimeters long. The blades are flat or folded, hairless, and light green to yellowish. The panicle-shaped inflorescence is narrow, with branches appressed to ascending. The spikelets have one flower each. The awns may be up to 3 centimeters long.

This grass grows in wet habitat, such as wet flatwoods and pond margins. It may be found in the ecotone between flatwoods and wet prairie habitat.
