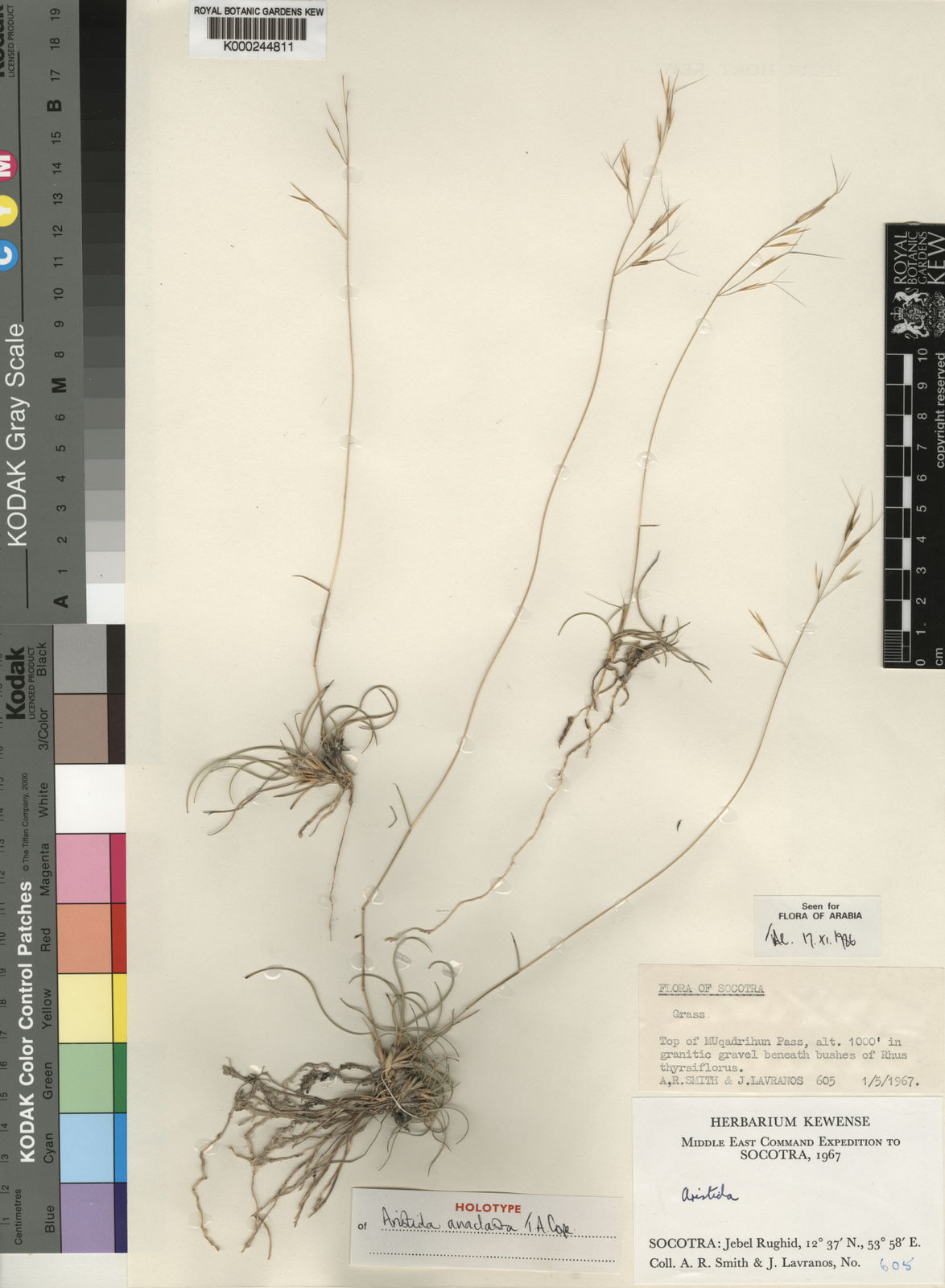

Conservation status
- Data Deficient (IUCN 3.1)

Scientific classification
- Kingdom: Plantae
- Clade: Tracheophytes
- Clade: Angiosperms
- Clade: Monocots
- Clade: Commelinids
- Order: Poales
- Family: Poaceae
- Genus: Aristida
- Species: A. anaclasta

Binomial name
- Aristida anaclasta Cope
- Known distribution of Aristida anaclasta on Socotra, with type locality marked in green

= Aristida anaclasta =

Species of grass

Aristida anaclasta is a species of grass in the family Poaceae. It is a perennial endemic to the island of Socotra in Yemen. It is known only from the type specimen, which was collected on the Rewgid plateau in north-central Socotra at about 300 metres elevation. The species is distinguished by its reflexed central awn.

== Description ==
Aristida anaclasta is a tuft-forming perennial grass native to Socotra. It grows in small clumps with erect stems reaching 17–35 cm in height. Most of the leaves are basal, with smooth, hairless sheaths and narrow blades that are tightly rolled, 1.5–6 cm long and only about 0.5 mm wide. The blades are often curved or slightly twisted, and smooth on the outside.

The flowering panicle is narrowly oval, 5–7 cm long, with few branches and relatively few spikelets. Spikelets are glabrous. The lower glume is lance-shaped, 7–8 mm long, with a single vein and a tiny two-toothed tip ending in a short mucro (0.3–0.5 mm). The upper glume is slightly longer (8.5–9.5 mm), also one-veined, with a minute two-toothed tip and a mucro 0.2–0.3 mm long. The lemma is cylindrical, 9–9.5 mm long (excluding the callus), roughened near the tip, and without a joint at the apex. The twisted column is short or absent. The callus is sharp, about 1 mm long, hairy and bearded above. The central awn is 12–16 mm long and spreading, while the two lateral awns are shorter and more upright.

These morphological details are confirmed in GrassBase, which records the species as a perennial, tufted grass with lemma longer than the glumes, a short or absent column, and a spreading central awn with shorter lateral awns.

== Taxonomy ==
Aristida anaclasta was first described by Thomas Arthur Cope in 1984 in Kew Bulletin. It belongs to the genus Aristida, a group of grasses in the family Poaceae, commonly known as three‑awn grasses because of their characteristic trio of awns on the lemma. Within the genus, it shows similarities to two African species, Aristida junciformis Trin. & Rupr. and Aristida denudata Pilger, which also possess a reflexed central awn.

Although similar in this feature, A. anaclasta differs in having the lemma longer than the glumes, whereas in both A. denudata and A. junciformis the glumes exceed the lemma. In A. denudata all three awns are reflexed and much longer, and the leaves are generally flat. A. junciformis has a contracted, more branched panicle, taller stature with longer leaves, and often produces rhizomes. These differences, together with the reflexed central awn, support the recognition of A. anaclasta as a distinct species.

The holotype was collected on 1 May 1967 during the Middle East Command Expedition to Socotra by Radcliffe‑Smith and Lavranos (collection no. 605) at the top of Muqadrihun Pass, at about 300 m elevation. It is preserved at the Royal Botanic Gardens, Kew (specimen K000244811).

== Habitat and distribution ==
The species is endemic to Socotra and is known only from the type locality. The holotype was collected at the top of Muqadrihun Pass in north-central Socotra, at an elevation of about 300 metres (1,000 feet). The locality lies below Jebel Rughid, one of the granite peaks of the Rewgid plateau. It was found in granitic gravel beneath bushes of Phus thyrsiflorus.

== Conservation ==
Aristida anaclasta has been assessed as Data Deficient on the IUCN Red List because it is known only from the type specimen collected in 1967. The current population size, distribution, and trends are unknown, and no further collections have been reported since the original description. As a result, there is insufficient information to evaluate potential threats or conservation needs. The species may be vulnerable due to its apparent restriction to a single locality on Socotra, but further field surveys are required to clarify its status.
