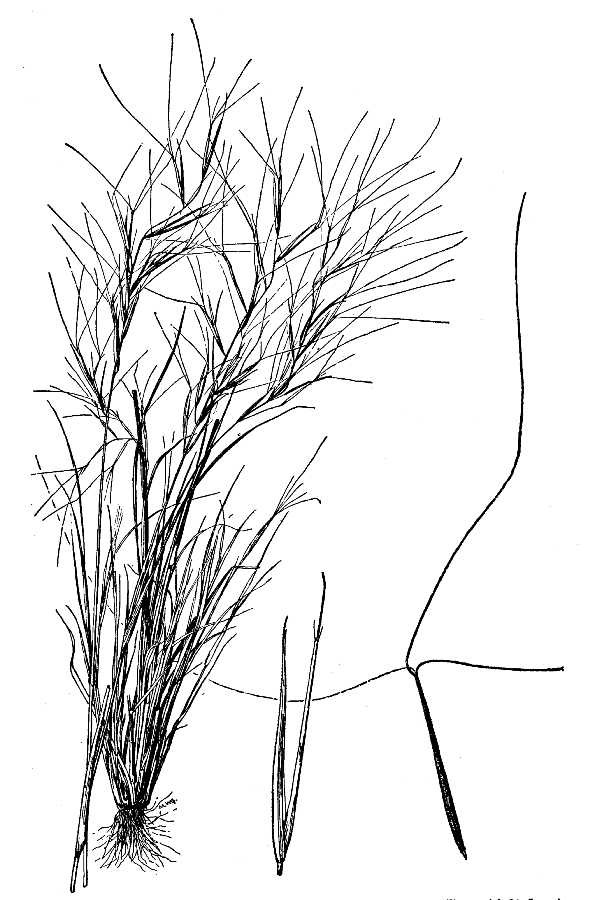
- 1950 illustration

Scientific classification
- Kingdom: Plantae
- Clade: Tracheophytes
- Clade: Angiosperms
- Clade: Monocots
- Clade: Commelinids
- Order: Poales
- Family: Poaceae
- Genus: Aristida
- Species: A. oligantha

Binomial name
- Aristida oligantha Michx.

= Aristida oligantha =

Species of grass

Aristida oligantha is a species of grass known by the common names prairie threeawn, oldfield threeawn and ant rice.

It is native to the United States and southern Canada, and it is known from northern Mexico. It is a grass of many types of habitat, and it grows easily in dry areas with sandy or gravelly soils. It appears in disturbed and burned areas and is sometimes a weed of roadsides and railroads.

This is an annual forming clumps of branching gray-green and purple-tinted stems about 30 to 70 centimeters tall. The inflorescence is an open array of spikelets. The grain has three spreading awns, the central one reaching up to 7 centimeters long and the other two slightly shorter.
