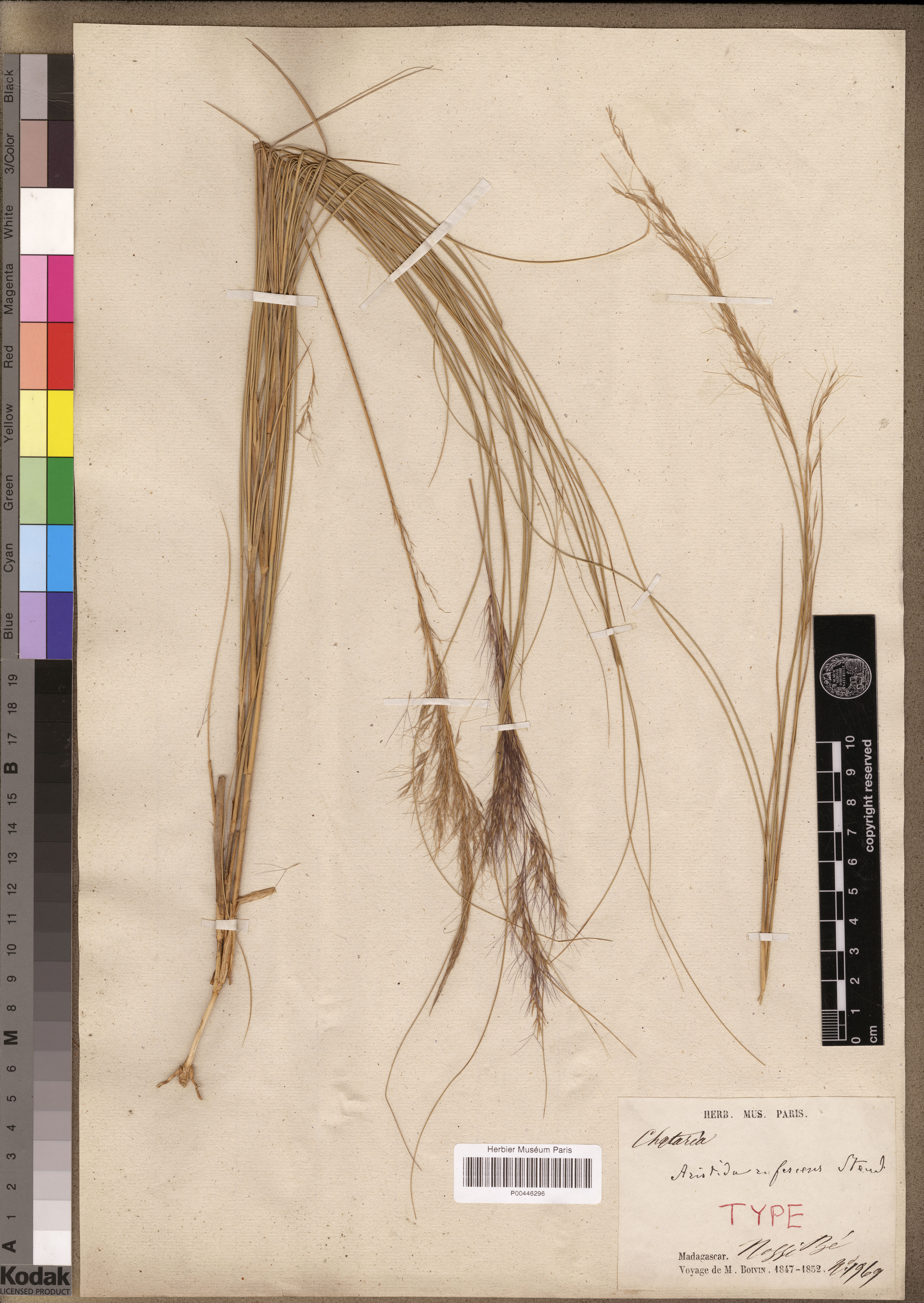
- Type specimen at the MNHN

Scientific classification
- Kingdom: Plantae
- Clade: Tracheophytes
- Clade: Angiosperms
- Clade: Monocots
- Clade: Commelinids
- Order: Poales
- Family: Poaceae
- Genus: Aristida
- Species: A. rufescens

Binomial name
- Aristida rufescens Steud.

Synonyms
- Aristida multicaulis Baker

= Aristida rufescens =

Species of grass

Aristida rufescens is a grass species native to Madagascar and to Mayotte in the Comoros archipelago. It was described by German agrostologist Ernst Gottlieb von Steudel in 1854.

The species is a perennial bunch grass with short rhizomes. Its culms are erect and 70–100 centimetres (28–39 in) long, with swollen nodes and hairy leaf sheaths. Leaf blades are 30–40 centimetres (12–16 in) long and 3 mm wide; they are stiff, leathery, and convolute. The inflorescence is a panicle in which each spikelet contains one fertile flower. Spikelets are lanceolate and 8.5 mm long. Upper and lower glumes have 1–2 mm long awns, and lateral lemmas have a 13–14 mm long awn, which is three-branched. The grass is a C_{4} plant.

Aristida rufescens is one of the dominant species in the grasslands of the central high plateaus of Madagascar. It is extremely fire-tolerant; although of poor quality when mature, young resprouts after fire are protein-rich cattle feed in the September to November "hungry season". In Malagasy, it is known locally as horona, horombohitra, kofafa vavy, horombavy, or pepeka. It is used for roofing and broom-making, and its ash for medical ointments.
