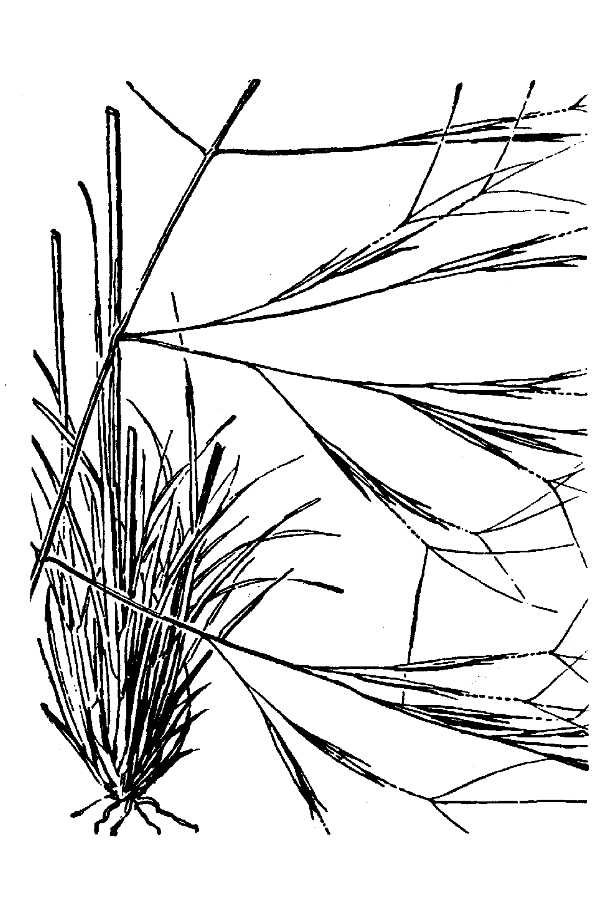

Scientific classification
- Kingdom: Plantae
- Clade: Tracheophytes
- Clade: Angiosperms
- Clade: Monocots
- Clade: Commelinids
- Order: Poales
- Family: Poaceae
- Genus: Aristida
- Species: A. divaricata

Binomial name
- Aristida divaricata Humb. & Bonpl. ex Willd.

= Aristida divaricata =

Species of grass

Aristida divaricata is a species of grass known by the common name poverty threeawn. It is native to the Americas from the central United States to Guatemala. It is a perennial grass forming clumps of unbranched stems up to 70 centimeters tall. Leaves are mostly basal and roll along the edges. The sparse inflorescence is a wide, flat, open array of spikelets that break apart easily. The grain has a twisted tip and three awns up to 2 centimeters long.
