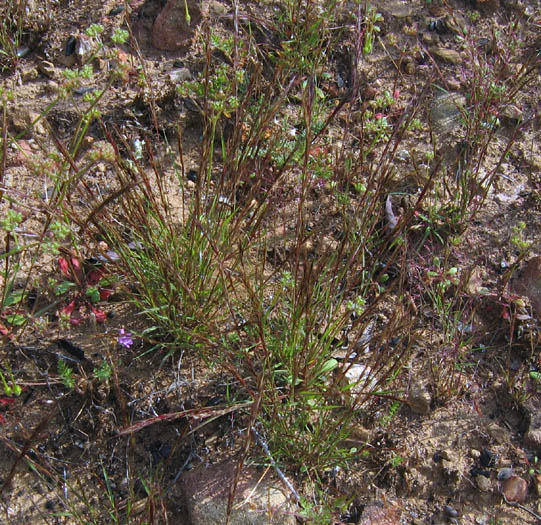

Conservation status
- Secure (NatureServe)

Scientific classification
- Kingdom: Plantae
- Clade: Tracheophytes
- Clade: Angiosperms
- Clade: Monocots
- Clade: Commelinids
- Order: Poales
- Family: Poaceae
- Genus: Aristida
- Species: A. adscensionis

Binomial name
- Aristida adscensionis L.

Synonyms
- Aristida fasciculata

= Aristida adscensionis =

Species of plant

Aristida adscensionis is a species of grass known by the common name sixweeks threeawn. It is native to the Americas but it is distributed nearly worldwide. It grows easily in disturbed and waste areas and has potential to become a weed.

== Description ==
This annual bunchgrass is quite variable in appearance, its size and shape determined largely by environmental conditions. It grows in a tuft to heights between 5 and 80 centimeters. It forms a narrow inflorescence of spikelets, each fruit with three awns.
