= Aristida pungens =

Scientific classification
- Kingdom: Plantae
- Clade: Tracheophytes
- Clade: Angiosperms
- Clade: Monocots
- Clade: Commelinids
- Order: Poales
- Family: Poaceae
- Genus: Aristida
- Species: A. pungens

Binomial name
- Aristida pungens Desf.

Species of grass

Aristida pungens is a member of the family Poaceae, known in Arabic as drinn.

== Uses ==
Aristida pungens is a tall perennial plant with deep roots and long leaves. Extremely drought-resistant, drinn grows in areas with as little as 70 mm of rainfall per year. A traditional food plant in Africa, this grain has potential to improve nutrition, boost food security, foster rural development, and support sustainable landcare.
