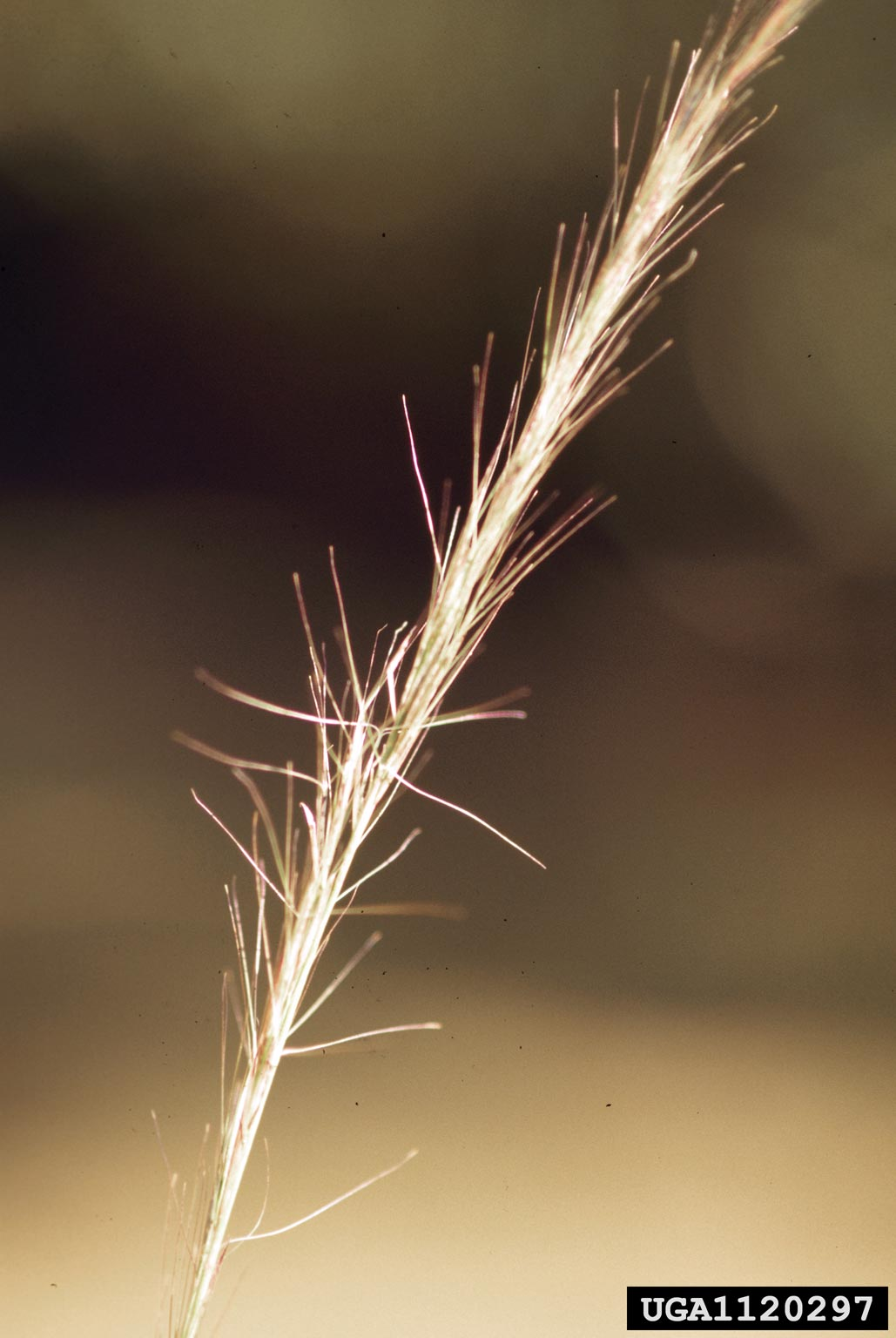

Conservation status
- Secure (NatureServe)

Scientific classification
- Kingdom: Plantae
- Clade: Tracheophytes
- Clade: Angiosperms
- Clade: Monocots
- Clade: Commelinids
- Order: Poales
- Family: Poaceae
- Genus: Aristida
- Species: A. purpurascens

Binomial name
- Aristida purpurascens Poir.

= Aristida purpurascens =

Species of grass

Aristida purpurascens is a species of grass known by the common name arrowfeather threeawn. It is native to eastern North America. One of the three varieties has a distribution extending south into Honduras.

== Description ==
A. purpurascens tolerates moderate shade. It lacks rhizomes. The leaf blades are hairless, pale green, and up to 25 centimeters in length. They may become curly with age. The panicle-shaped inflorescence has branches appressed to the stem, making it narrow. The awns may be up to 2.5 centimeters in length. Individuals tend to be between 0.46 meters to 0.61 meters (1.5 to 2.0 feet) in height. A. purpurascens possesses fibrous roots, which have a nonstructural carbohydrate concentration of 69.5 milligrams and a below-ground to aboveground biomass ration of 0.49.

A. purpurascens is primarily found in dry habitats, including but not limited to: dunes, fields, and pine savannas. Within reestablished longleaf pine woodlands, A. purpurascens may be used as an indicator species due to its ability to regrow in areas previously disturbed by agricultural practices.

This species tends to increase in frequency in response to understory burning, particularly within longleaf pine savannas.

This plant may be grazed when young but as it ages it becomes low in quality and even dangerous for livestock because of the sharp spikelets.
