= Aristida arida =

Scientific classification
- Kingdom: Plantae
- Clade: Tracheophytes
- Clade: Angiosperms
- Clade: Monocots
- Clade: Commelinids
- Order: Poales
- Family: Poaceae
- Genus: Aristida
- Species: A. arida

Binomial name
- Aristida arida B.K.Simon

Species of grass

Aristida arida is a species of grass in the family Poaceae, endemic to arid regions of central and southern Australia. It was first formally described by botanist B.K. Simon in 1984 in Austrobaileya. Commonly referred to as a type of three-awn grass, the species is adapted to red earths, skeletal soils, and sandstone habitats, often occurring in association with mulga (Acacia aneura) woodlands. Its distribution includes Western Australia, the Northern Territory, and South Australia, particularly around Alice Springs, Lake Eyre, and the Flinders Ranges. Flowering and fruiting occur throughout the year, with peak activity between April and September. Morphologically, A. arida is distinguished by its contracted spicate panicles, unequal glumes, and tuberculate lemmas, features that separate it from related species such as Aristida nitidula and Aristida strigosa.

== Taxonomy ==
A. arida was first formally described by botanist B.K. Simon in 1984 in Austrobaileya. The protologue diagnosis reads (translated from Latin):

A. arida B.K. Simon, a new species, related to A. nitidula (Henrard) S.T. Blake ex J. Black but differing in having unequal glumes, and related to A. strigosa (Henrard) S.T. Blake ex J. Black but differing in having a tuberculate lemma that is not scabrous.

The type specimen was collected by Michael Lazarides (collection number 5725) and is housed at the Queensland Herbarium (BRI, accession BRI 021231) as the holotype. Isotypes are deposited at CANB, MEL, NSW, NT, and PERTH.
