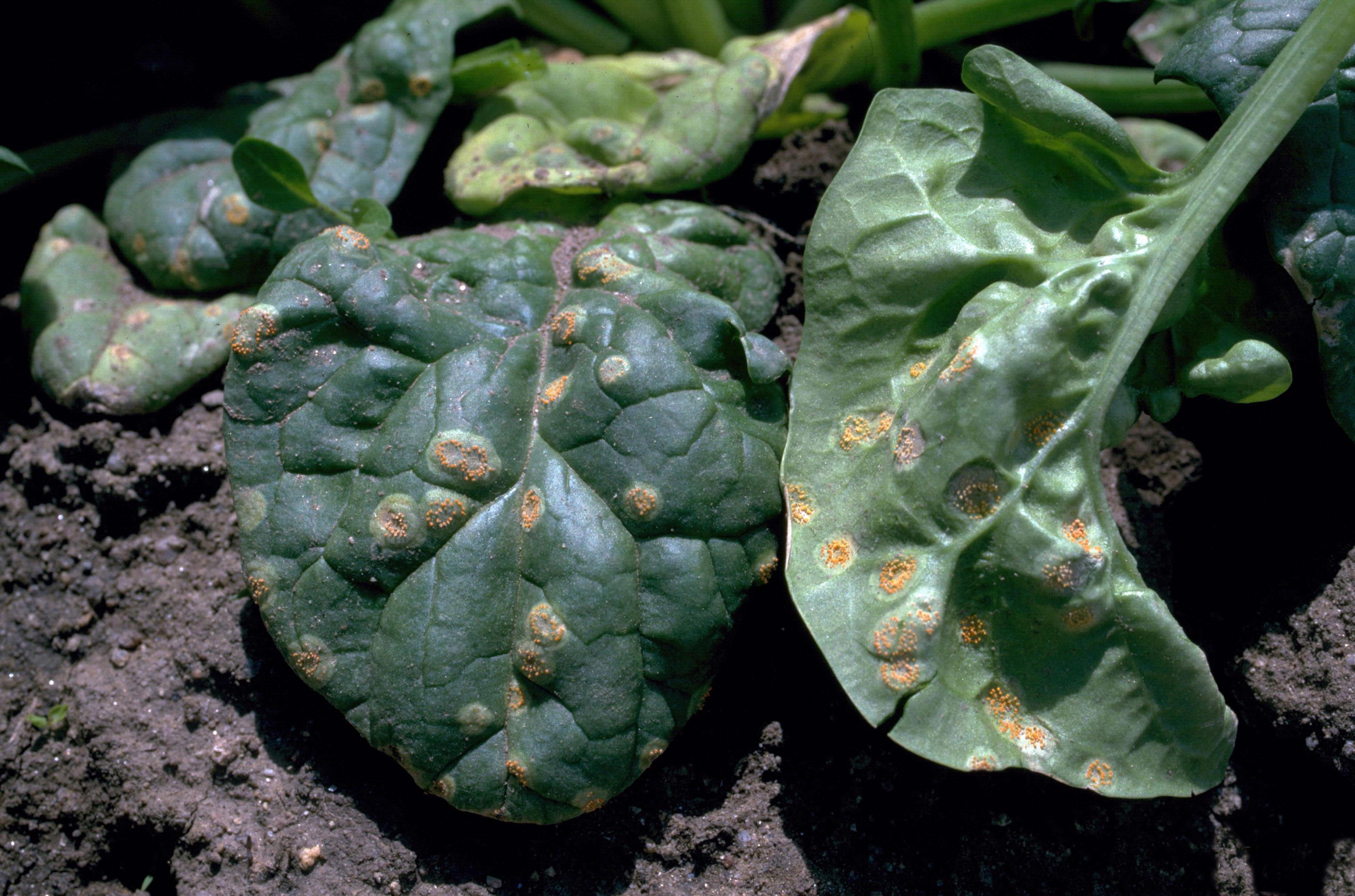
- Puccinia aristidae causing rust on spinach

Scientific classification
- Domain: Eukaryota
- Kingdom: Fungi
- Division: Basidiomycota
- Class: Pucciniomycetes
- Order: Pucciniales
- Family: Pucciniaceae
- Genus: Puccinia
- Species: P. aristidae

Binomial name
- Puccinia aristidae Tracy (1893)

Synonyms
- Dicaeoma aristidae (Tracy) Kuntze (1898)

= Puccinia aristidae =

Species of fungus

Puccinia aristidae is a plant pathogen that causes rust on Aristida, spinach and primula.

== See also ==
- List of Puccinia species
