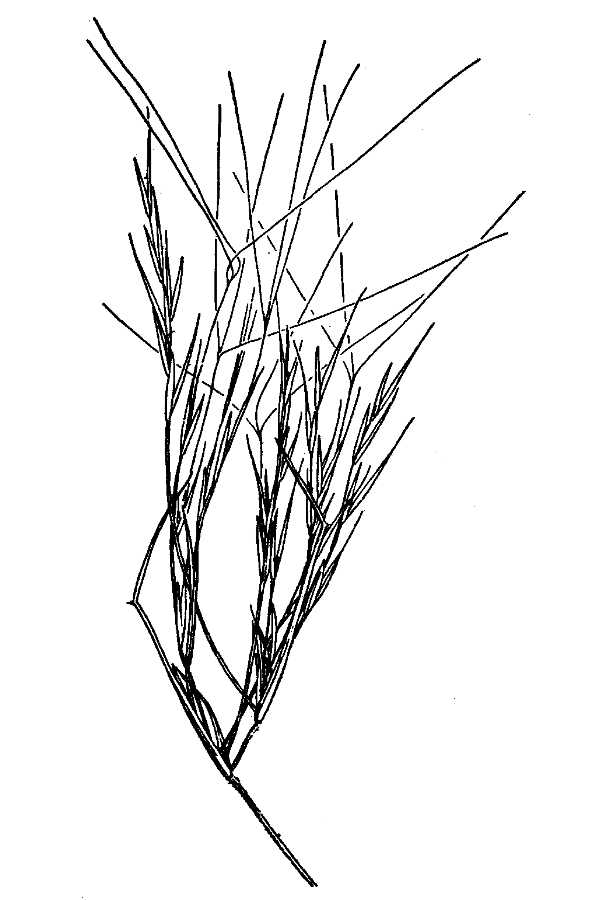

Scientific classification
- Kingdom: Plantae
- Clade: Tracheophytes
- Clade: Angiosperms
- Clade: Monocots
- Clade: Commelinids
- Order: Poales
- Family: Poaceae
- Genus: Aristida
- Species: A. californica

Binomial name
- Aristida californica Thurb. ex S.Wats.

= Aristida californica =

Species of flowering plant

Aristida californica is a species of grass known by the common names California threeawn and Mojave threeawn. It is native to the Mojave Deserts and Sonoran of northern Mexico and California and Arizona.

== Description ==
Aristida californica is a clumpy, hairy grass forming bushy tufts up to about 40 centimeters tall in its sandy habitat. The inflorescence contains hard spikelets with a long beak at the tip and awns up to 4.5 centimeters long.
