= Aristida portoricensis =

Conservation status
- Endangered (ESA)

Scientific classification
- Kingdom: Plantae
- Clade: Tracheophytes
- Clade: Angiosperms
- Clade: Monocots
- Clade: Commelinids
- Order: Poales
- Family: Poaceae
- Genus: Aristida
- Species: A. portoricensis

Binomial name
- Aristida portoricensis Pilg.

Species of plant

Aristida portoricensis is a rare species of grass known by the common name pelos del diablo ("hair of the devil"). It is endemic to Puerto Rico, where it is known from two locations, one in a residential area of Mayagüez and one in the Sierra Bermeja. Two other known sites have been extirpated by development of the habitat. It is a federally listed endangered species of the United States.

This is a perennial grass producing a tuft of stems up to 30 to 50 centimeters tall. The inflorescence is a narrow panicle a few centimeters in length. Its habitat includes subtropical wet forests and grassland on soils of clay and serpentine origin. Development of the Sierra Bermeja is a potential threat for the grass and many other endemic plant species. Vandalism of the few remaining plants is also a potential threat.
