= Aristida capillacea =

Scientific classification
- Kingdom: Plantae
- Clade: Tracheophytes
- Clade: Angiosperms
- Clade: Monocots
- Clade: Commelinids
- Order: Poales
- Family: Poaceae
- Genus: Aristida
- Species: A. capillacea

Binomial name
- Aristida capillacea Lam.

Synonyms
- Aristida elegans Rudge; Chaetaria capillacea (Lam.) P.Beauv.; Chaetaria capillaris Nees

Species of grass

Aristida capillacea is a species of plant in the grass family (Poaceae). It is found in South America.

Note: Aristida capillacea Cav. is a synonym for Aristida cumingiana Trin. & Rupr.
