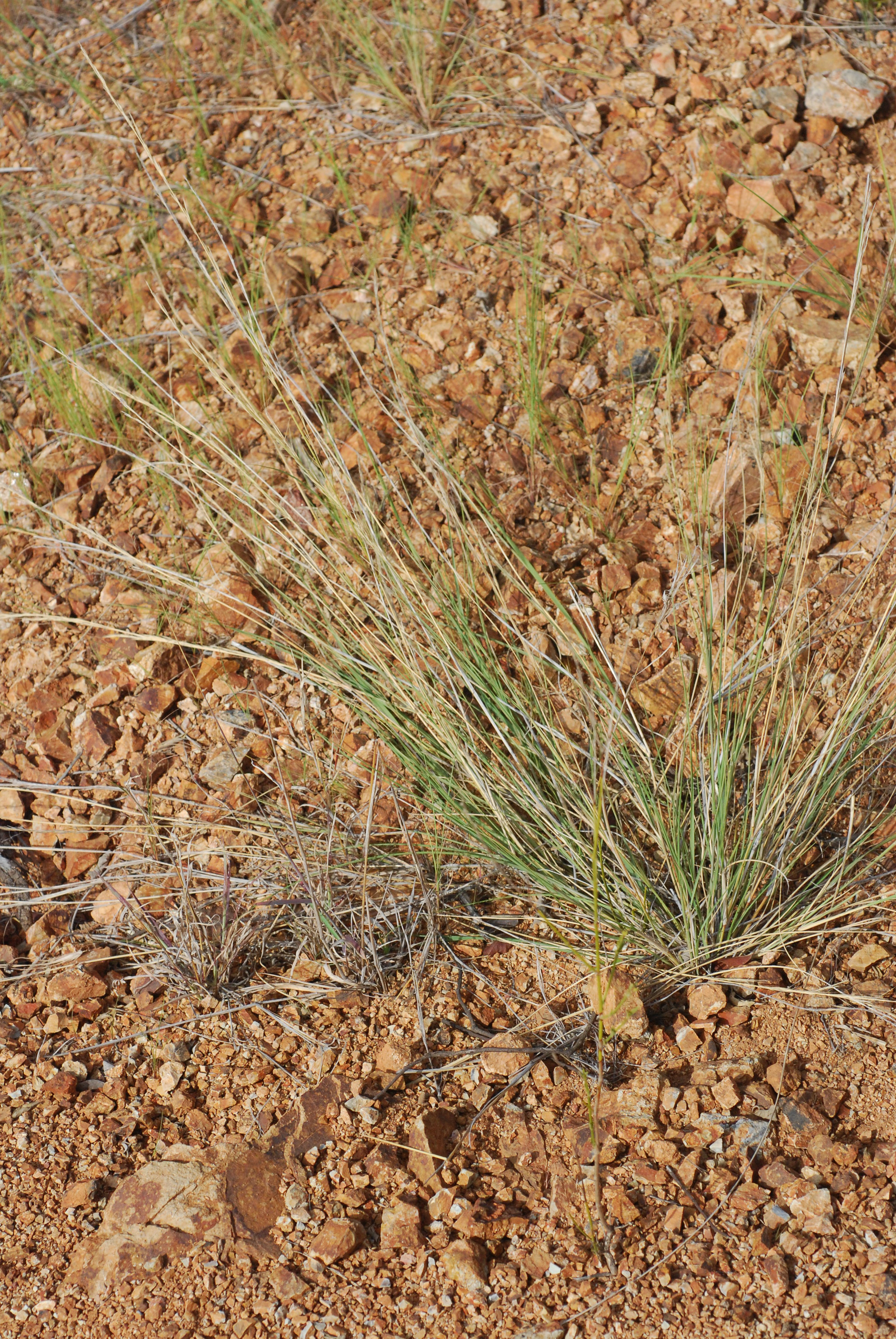

Conservation status
- Endangered (ESA)

Scientific classification
- Kingdom: Plantae
- Clade: Tracheophytes
- Clade: Angiosperms
- Clade: Monocots
- Clade: Commelinids
- Order: Poales
- Family: Poaceae
- Genus: Aristida
- Species: A. chaseae

Binomial name
- Aristida chaseae Hitchc.

= Aristida chaseae =

Species of plant

Aristida chaseae is a rare species of grass known by the common name Chase's threeawn. It is endemic to Puerto Rico, where it is known from two locations in the Cabo Rojo National Wildlife Refuge and the Sierra Bermeja. It is a federally listed endangered species of the United States. It cannot compete with introduced species of grasses, such as Brachiaria subquadripara, which are invading its habitat.

This is a perennial grass producing a tuft of stems up to half a meter high or a bit taller. Plants occurring in the deep soils of Cabo Rojo tend to be more robust than those growing in the poorer soils of the Sierra Bermeja. Cabo Rojo plants occur in coastal grassland habitat, and those in the Sierra grow in acidic clay soils with many rocky outcrops. Development of the Sierra Bermeja is a potential threat for the grass and many other endemic plant species.
