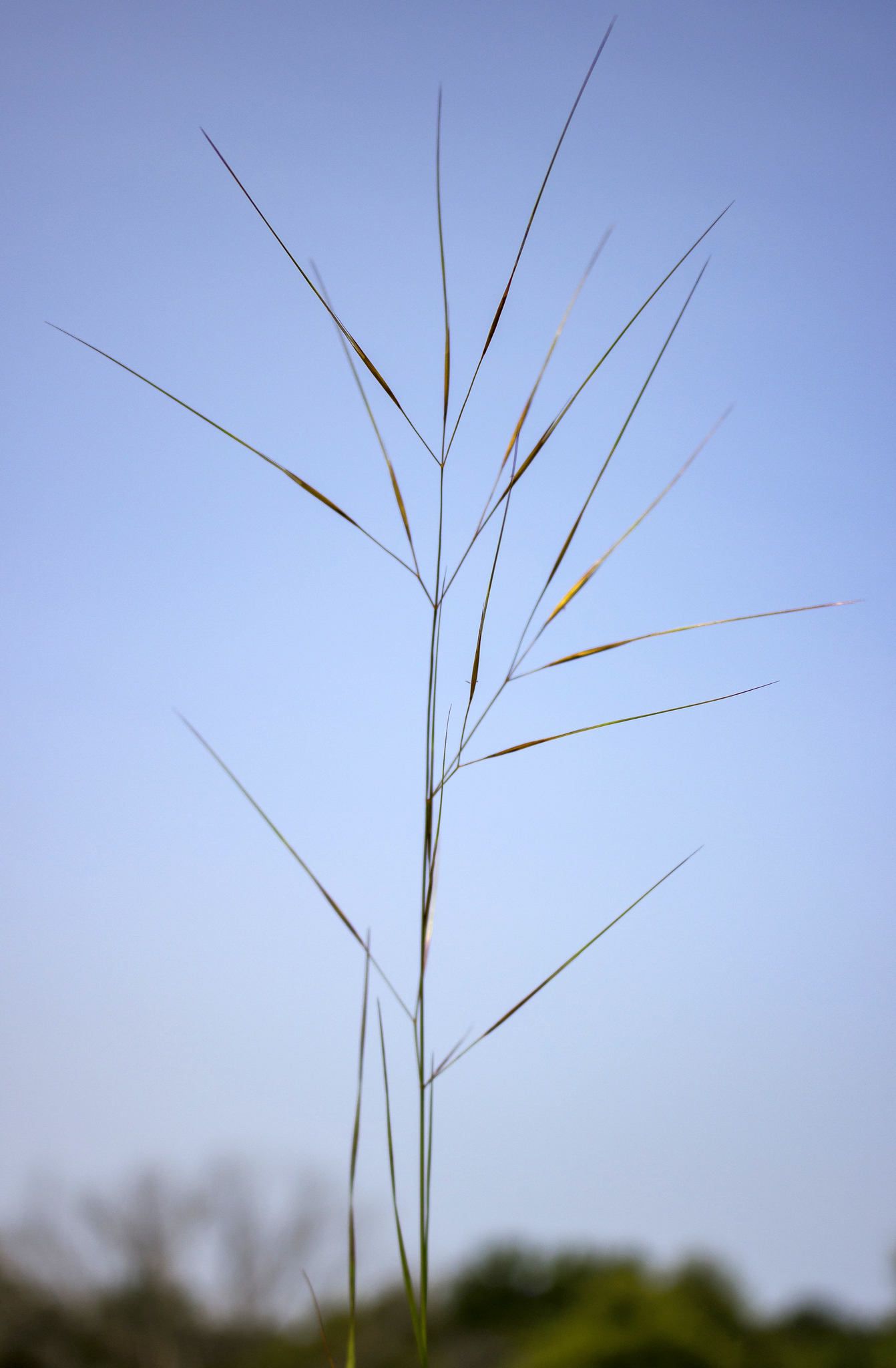

Scientific classification
- Kingdom: Plantae
- Clade: Tracheophytes
- Clade: Angiosperms
- Clade: Monocots
- Clade: Commelinids
- Order: Poales
- Family: Poaceae
- Genus: Aristida
- Species: A. tuberculosa

Binomial name
- Aristida tuberculosa Nutt.

= Aristida tuberculosa =

Species of grass

Aristida tuberculosa, common names seaside threeawn, seabeach needlegrass, beach three-awned grass and beach needlegrass, is annual plant native to the United States.

== Conservation status within the United States ==
It is listed as endangered in Connecticut and New Hampshire, as rare in Indiana, and as threatened in Massachusetts and Michigan.
