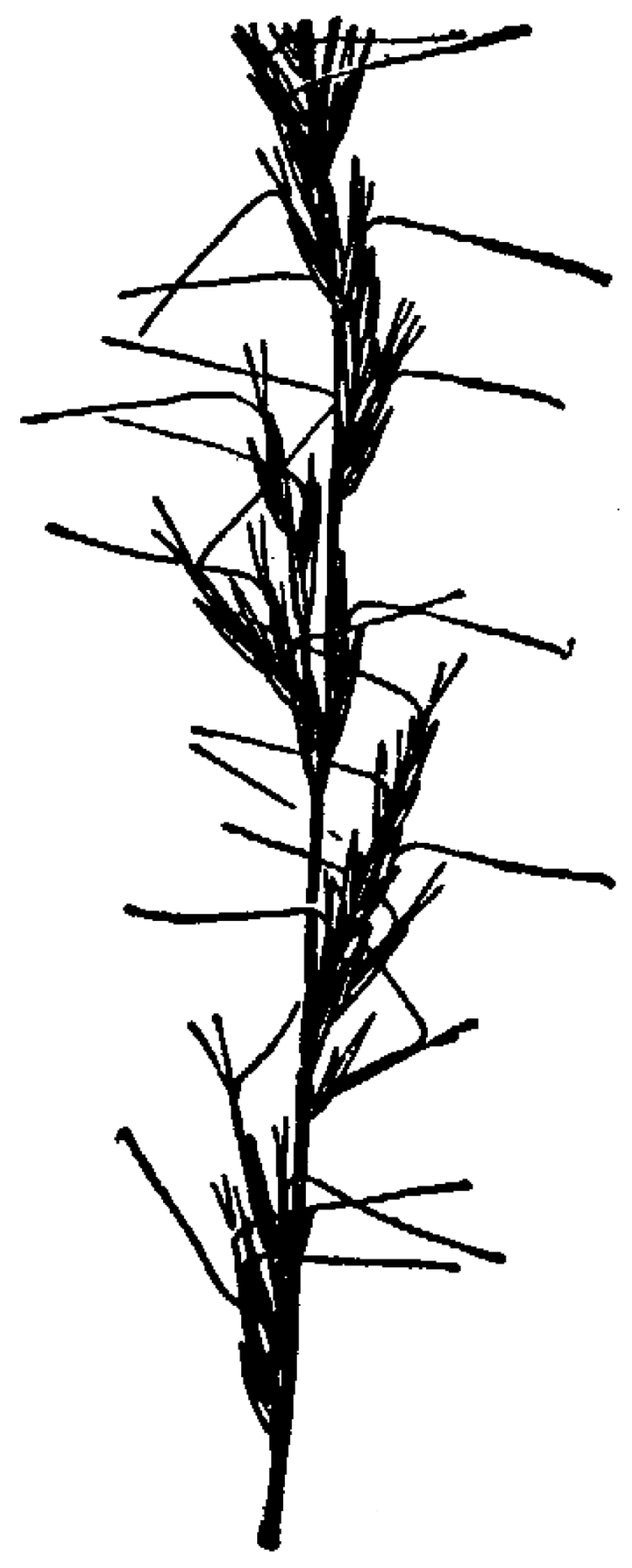

Scientific classification
- Kingdom: Plantae
- Clade: Tracheophytes
- Clade: Angiosperms
- Clade: Monocots
- Clade: Commelinids
- Order: Poales
- Family: Poaceae
- Genus: Aristida
- Species: A. longespica

Binomial name
- Aristida longespica Poir.

= Aristida longespica =

Species of grass

Aristida longespica is a species of grass known by the common name slimspike threeawn. Aristida longespica var. geniculata is listed as a species of special concern in the State of Connecticut.

== Gallery ==
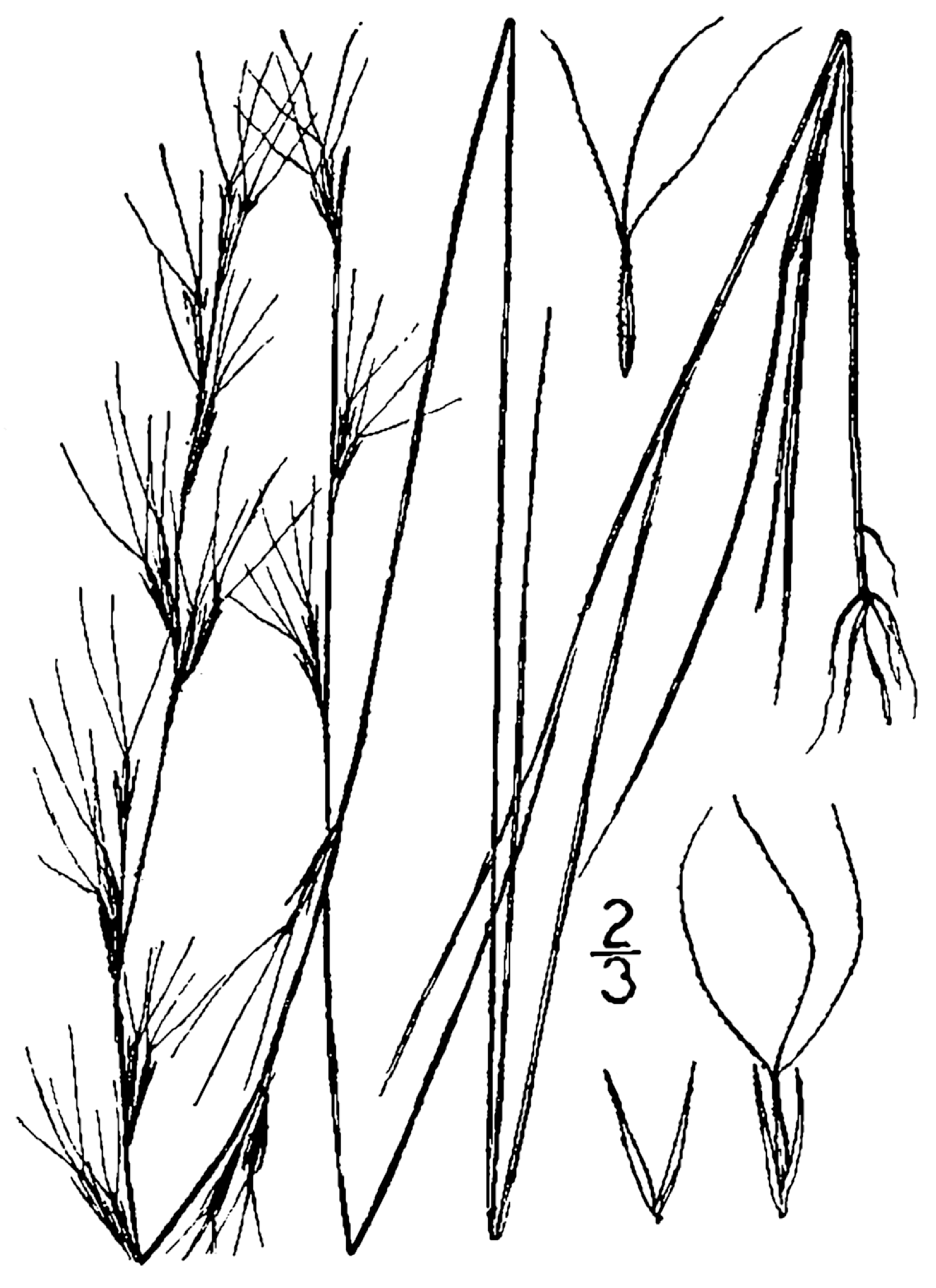
Aristida longespica var. geniculata

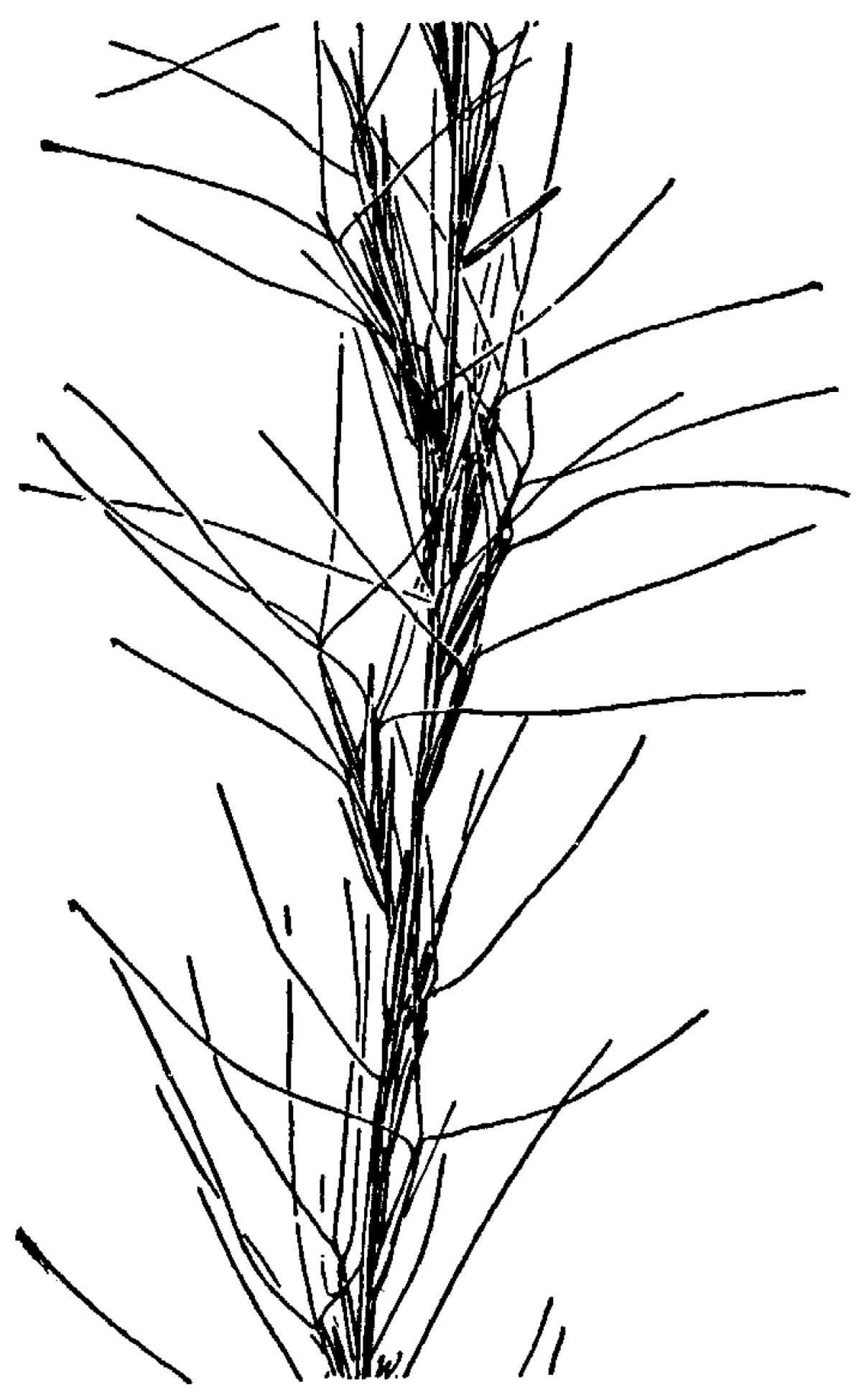
Aristida longespica var. geniculata
