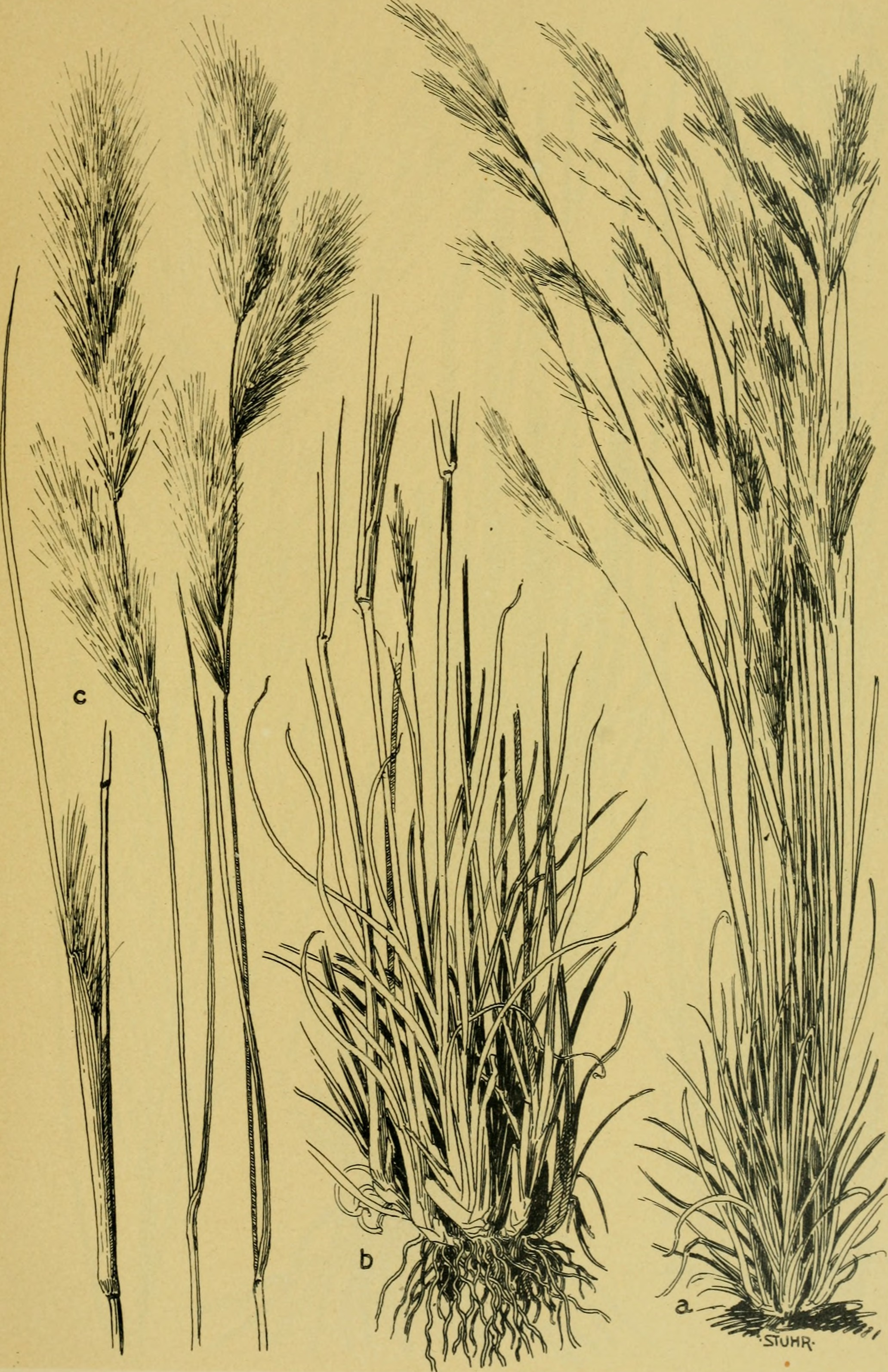

Scientific classification
- Kingdom: Plantae
- Clade: Embryophytes
- Clade: Tracheophytes
- Clade: Spermatophytes
- Clade: Angiosperms
- Clade: Monocots
- Clade: Commelinids
- Order: Poales
- Family: Poaceae
- Genus: Aristida
- Species: A. congesta

Binomial name
- Aristida congesta Roem. & Schult.

= Aristida congesta =

Tassel three-awn

Species of plant

Aristida congesta (tassel three-awn, Afrikaans: Aapstertsteekgras) is a species of grass native to all provinces of South Africa as well as Namibia, Botswana, Eswatini, Lesotho, and Mozambique. The SANBI Red List classifies it as "safe."

SANBI mentions two subspecies:

Aristida congesta Roem. & Schult. subsp. congesta
Aristida congesta Roem. & Schult. subsp. barbicollis (Trin. & Rupr.) De Winter

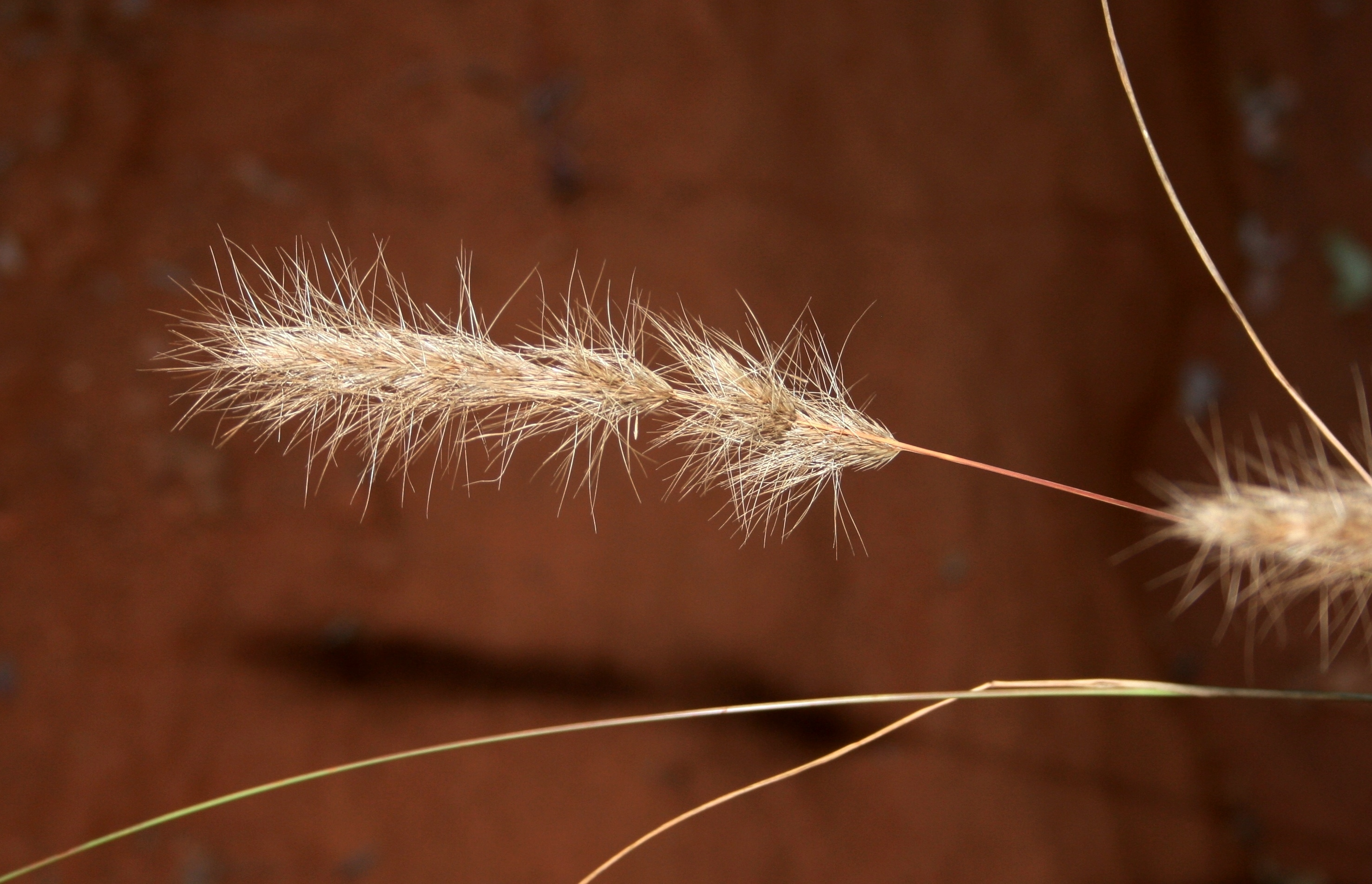
The inflorescence in winter, Limpopo

It is a thick perennial tussock that grows 10–75 cm high. The leaves can be flat or folded. The plumes are 3–20 cm long. The spikelets have uneven husks. The upper portion is the widest, at 6.5–10 mm. It can be found on deciduous woodland on rocky slopes and weathered areas.

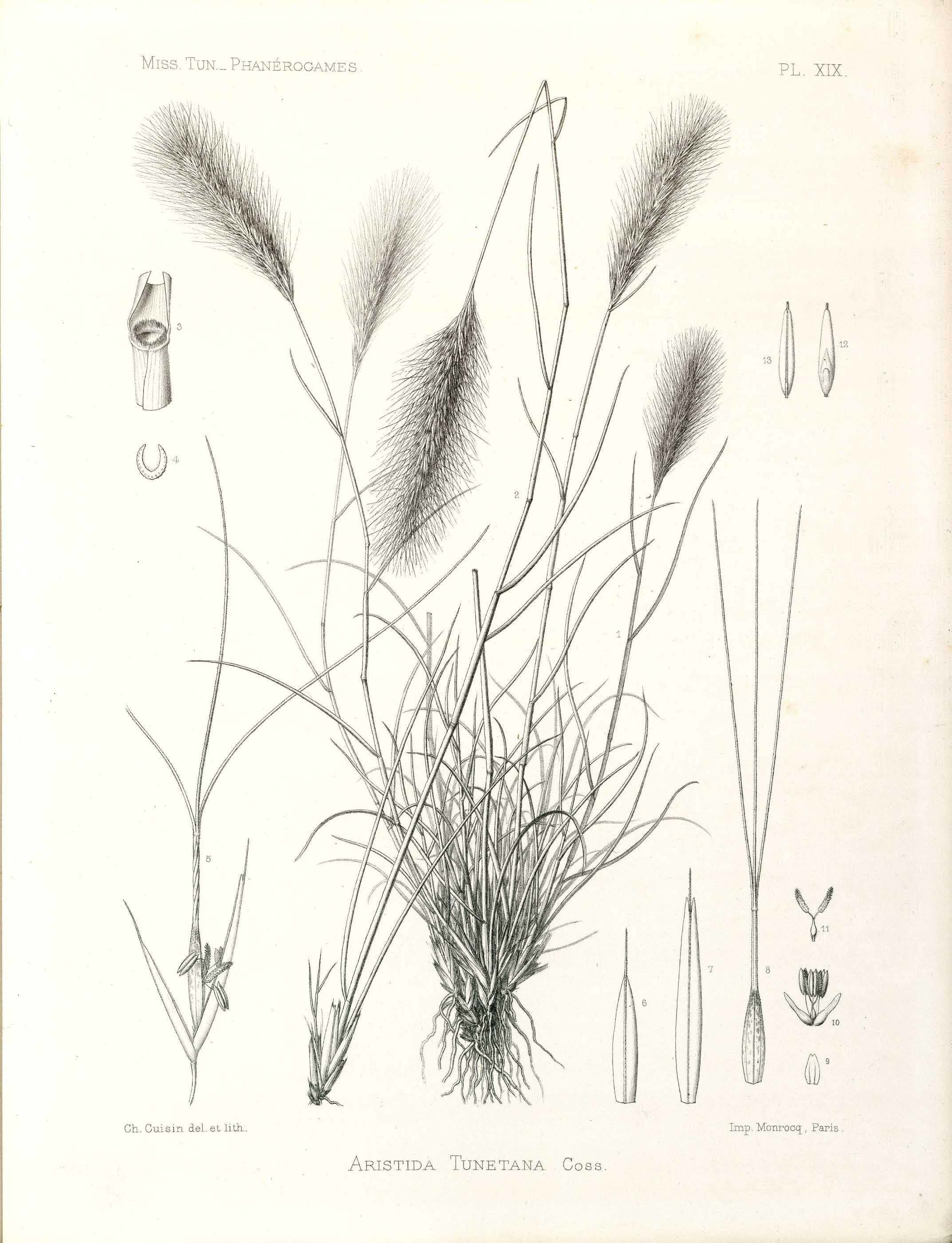
Sketch by Roem and Schult
