= Aristida dichotoma =

Scientific classification
- Kingdom: Plantae
- Clade: Tracheophytes
- Clade: Angiosperms
- Clade: Monocots
- Clade: Commelinids
- Order: Poales
- Family: Poaceae
- Genus: Aristida
- Species: A. dichotoma

Binomial name
- Aristida dichotoma Michx.

Synonyms
- Aristida dichotoma f. major Shinners; Avena paradoxa Willd. ex Kunth; Avena setacea Muhl. ex Trin.; Curtopogon dichotomus (Michx.) P.Beauv.

Species of grass

Aristida dichotoma, known as churchmouse threeawn, fork-tip three-awn, pigbutt three-awn, and poverty grass, is a species of grass from eastern North America. It is native to the Eastern and Midwestern United States and Ontario, Canada. It has been introduced in California. It was described in 1803 by André Michaux.

Aristida dichotoma has also been known as beard grass and branching aristida. The specific epithet is from the Latin for "forked".
