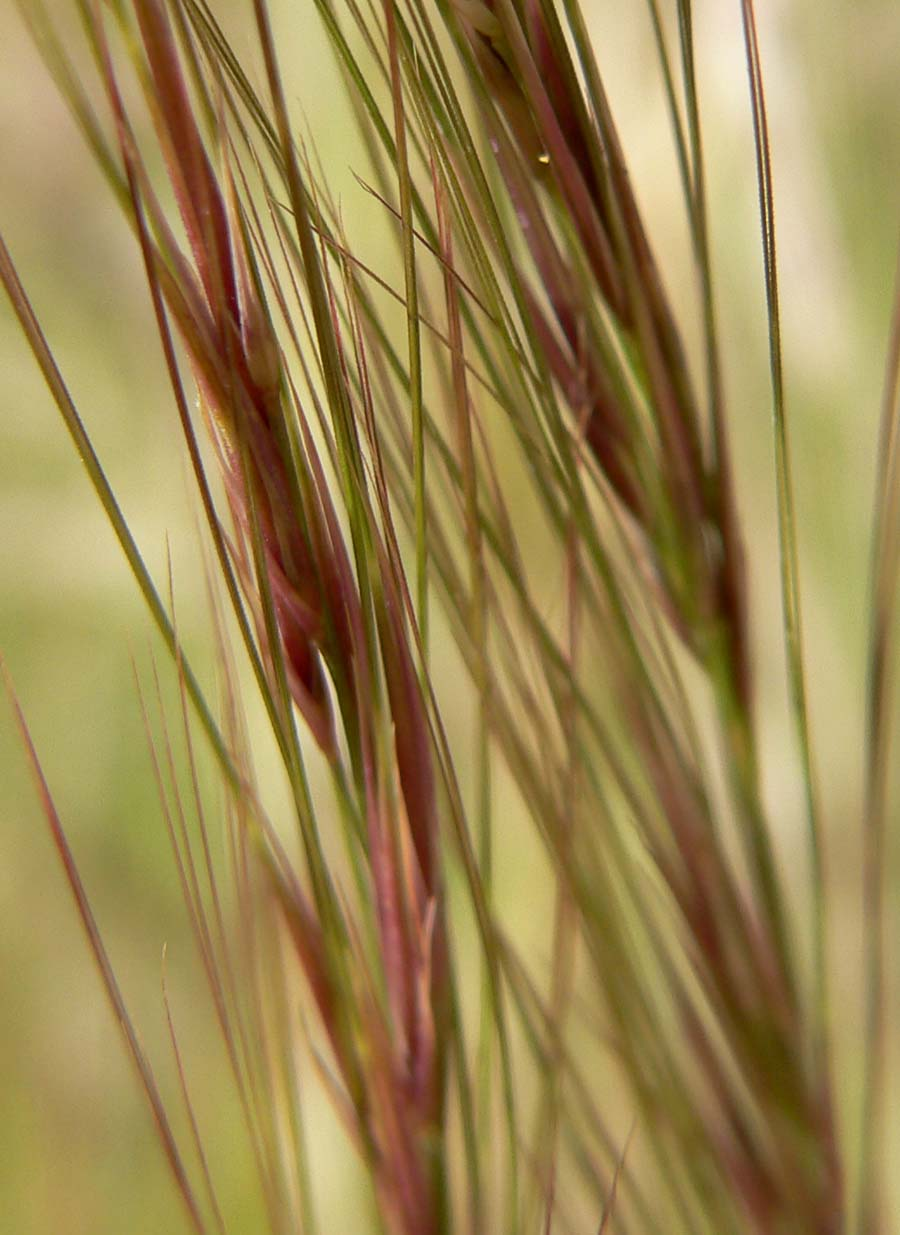

Conservation status
- Least Concern (IUCN 3.1)

Scientific classification
- Kingdom: Plantae
- Clade: Tracheophytes
- Clade: Angiosperms
- Clade: Monocots
- Clade: Commelinids
- Order: Poales
- Family: Poaceae
- Genus: Aristida
- Species: A. purpurea

Binomial name
- Aristida purpurea Nutt.

= Aristida purpurea =

Purple three-awn

Species of flowering plant

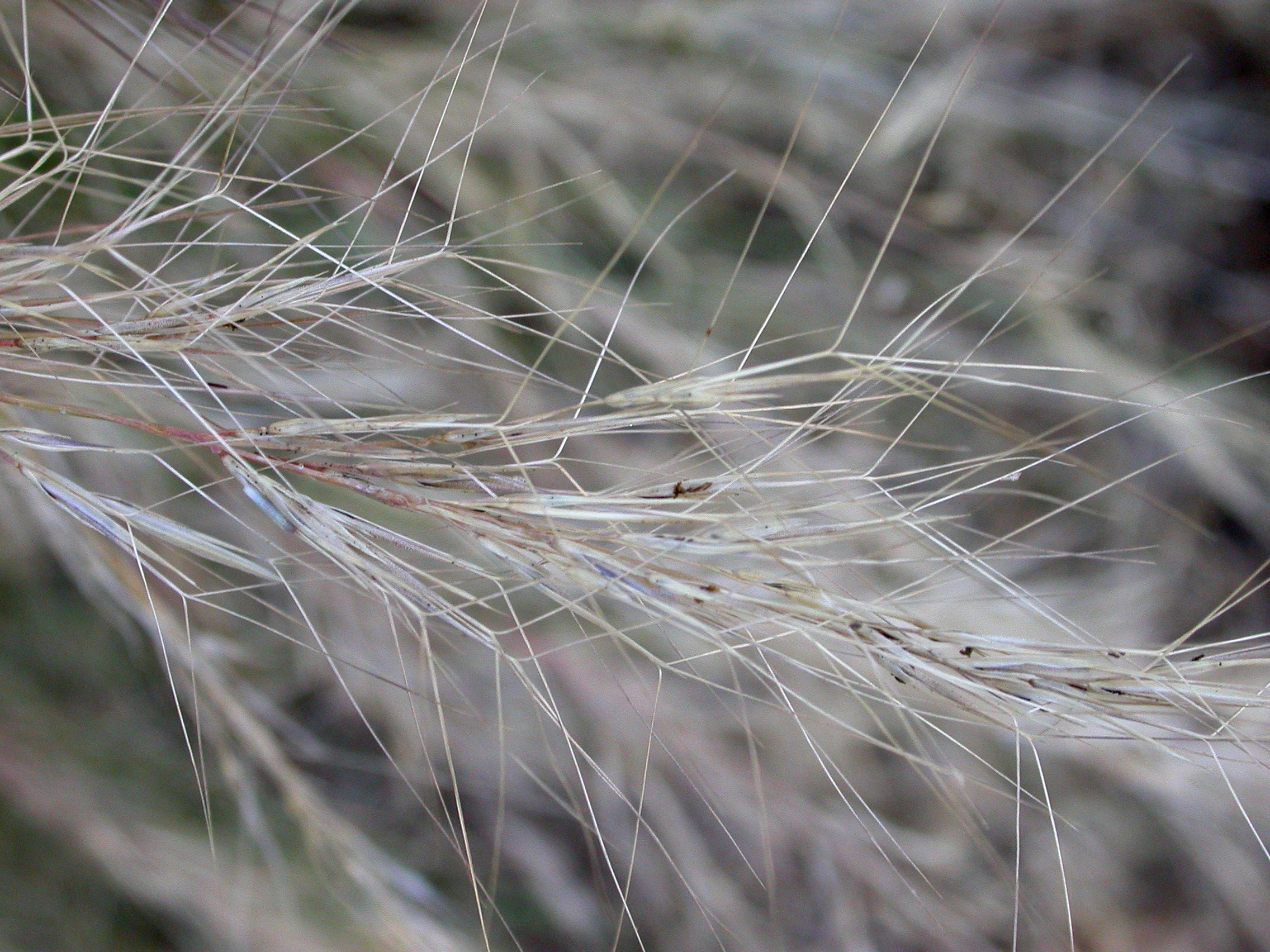
Spikelets showing the characteristic three awns apiece

Aristida purpurea is a species of grass native to North America which is known by the common name purple three-awn.

== Distribution ==
This grass is fairly widespread and can be found across the western two thirds of the United States, much of southern Canada and parts of northern Mexico. It is most abundant on the plains.

== Description ==
This is a perennial bunchgrass, growing erect to under a meter (3 feet) in height, with flower glumes often assuming a light brown to reddish-purple color. There are several varieties with overlapping geographical ranges. This is not considered to be a good graze for livestock because the awns are sharp and the protein content of the grass is low.
