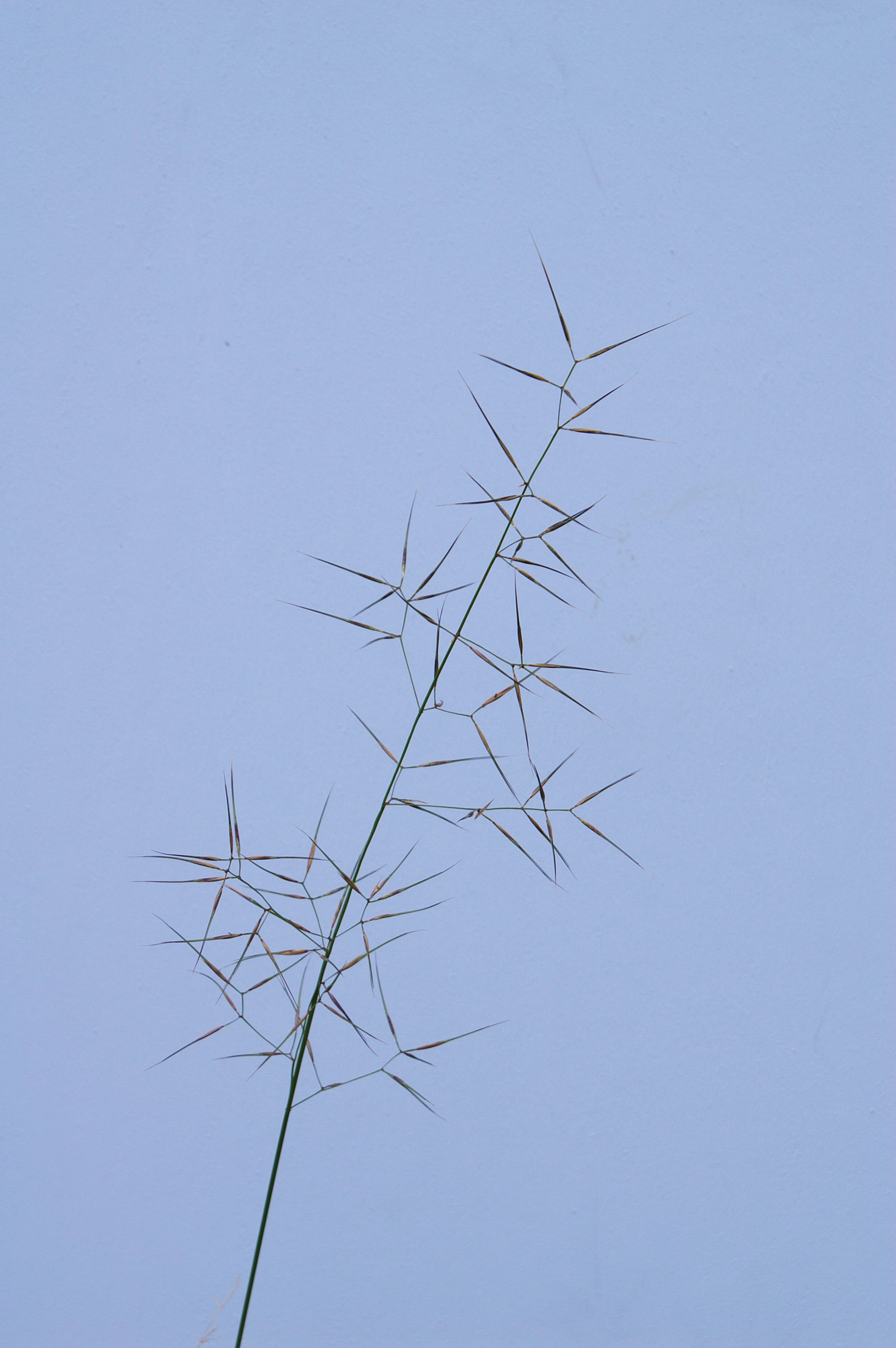

Scientific classification
- Kingdom: Plantae
- Clade: Tracheophytes
- Clade: Angiosperms
- Clade: Monocots
- Clade: Commelinids
- Order: Poales
- Family: Poaceae
- Genus: Aristida
- Species: A. vagans

Binomial name
- Aristida vagans Cav.

Synonyms
- Aristida parviflora Steud.

= Aristida vagans =

Threeawn speargrass

Species of grass

Aristida vagans, the threeawn speargrass, is a species of grass native to Australia. Found in dry eucalyptus woodland or forest, it may reach 80 cm (30 in) tall. The specific epithet vagans is from Latin, meaning "wanderer". The plant was first collected by botanists in Sydney, and published in 1799 by the Spanish taxonomist Antonio José Cavanilles.
