= Aristida guayllabambensis =

Conservation status
- Vulnerable (IUCN 3.1)

Scientific classification
- Kingdom: Plantae
- Clade: Tracheophytes
- Clade: Angiosperms
- Clade: Monocots
- Clade: Commelinids
- Order: Poales
- Family: Poaceae
- Genus: Aristida
- Species: A. guayllabambensis

Binomial name
- Aristida guayllabambensis Lægaard

Species of grass

Aristida guayllabambensis is a species of grass found only in Ecuador.
