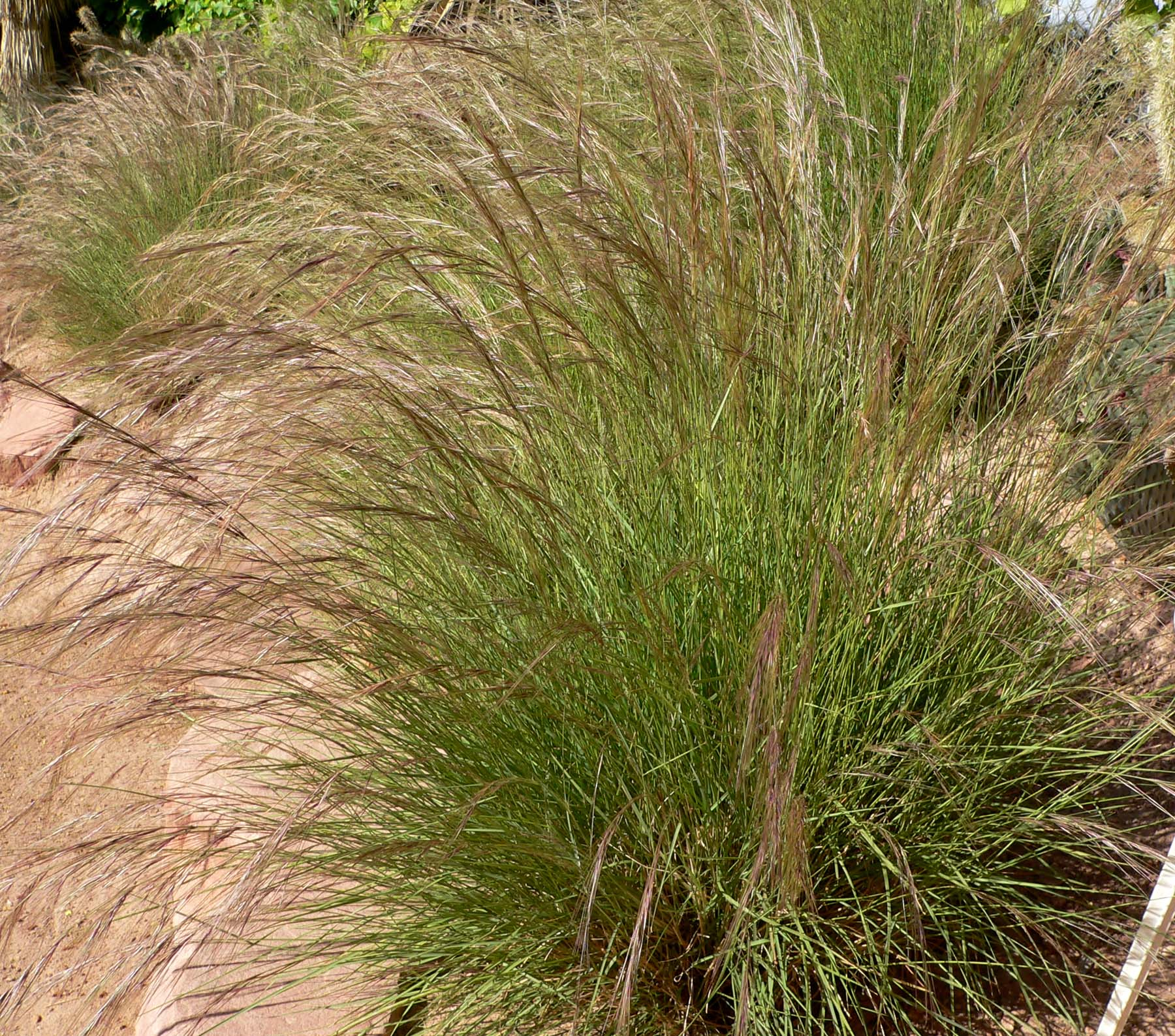
- Purple three-awn, Aristida purpurea

Scientific classification
- Kingdom: Plantae
- Clade: Tracheophytes
- Clade: Angiosperms
- Clade: Monocots
- Clade: Commelinids
- Order: Poales
- Family: Poaceae
- Subfamily: Aristidoideae
- Tribe: Aristideae
- Genus: Aristida; L.

Type species
- Aristida adscensionis L.

Species
- See list of Aristida species

Synonyms
- Kielboul Adans.; Streptachne R.Br.; Arthratherum P.Beauv.; Chaetaria P.Beauv.; Curtopogon P.Beauv.; Cyrtopogon Spreng.; Moulinsia Raf. 1830, illegitimate homonym not Cambess. 1829 nor Blume 1849; Trixostis Raf.; Aristopsis Catasús

= Aristida =

Genus of grasses

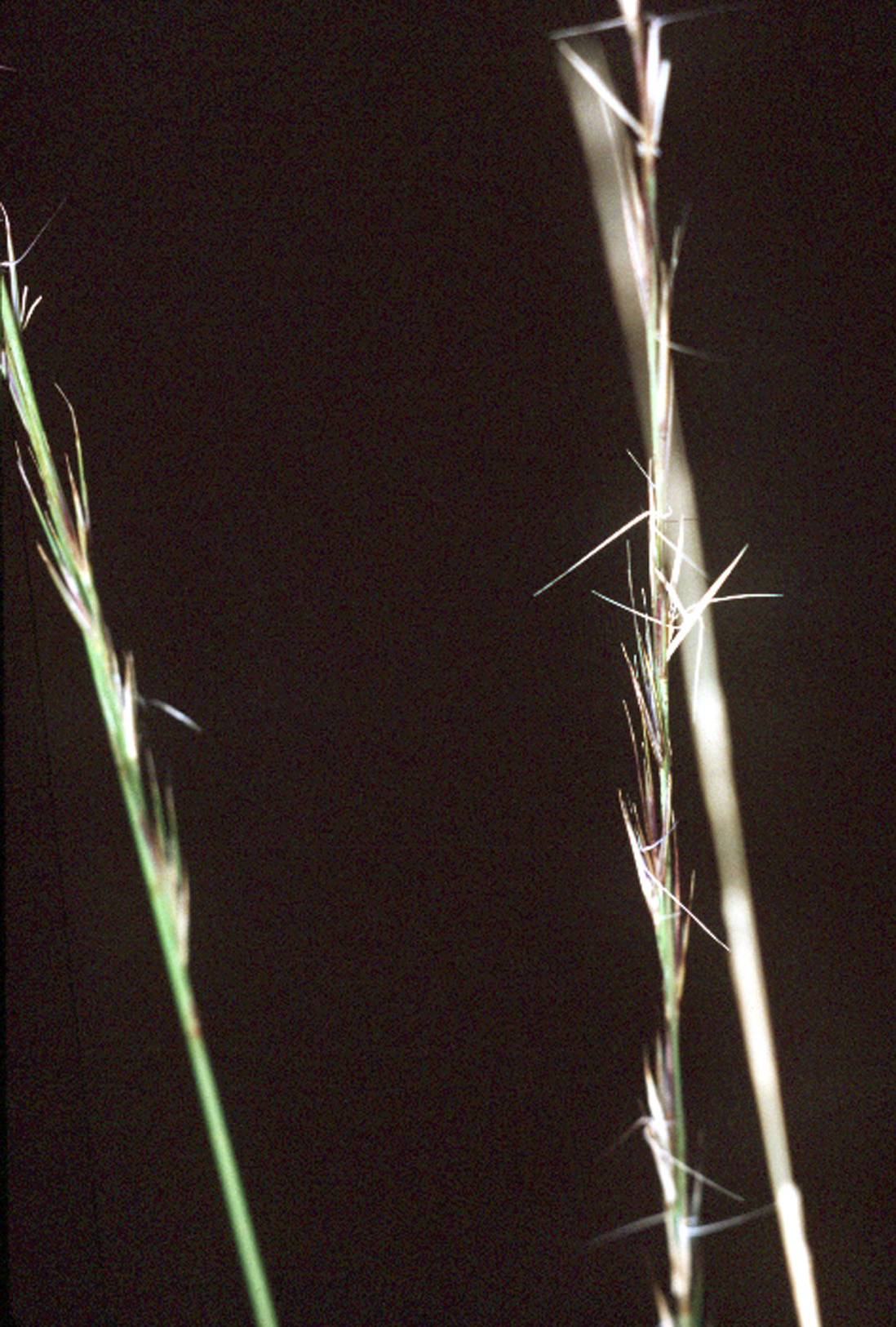
Pineland three-awn (A. stricta) flowers

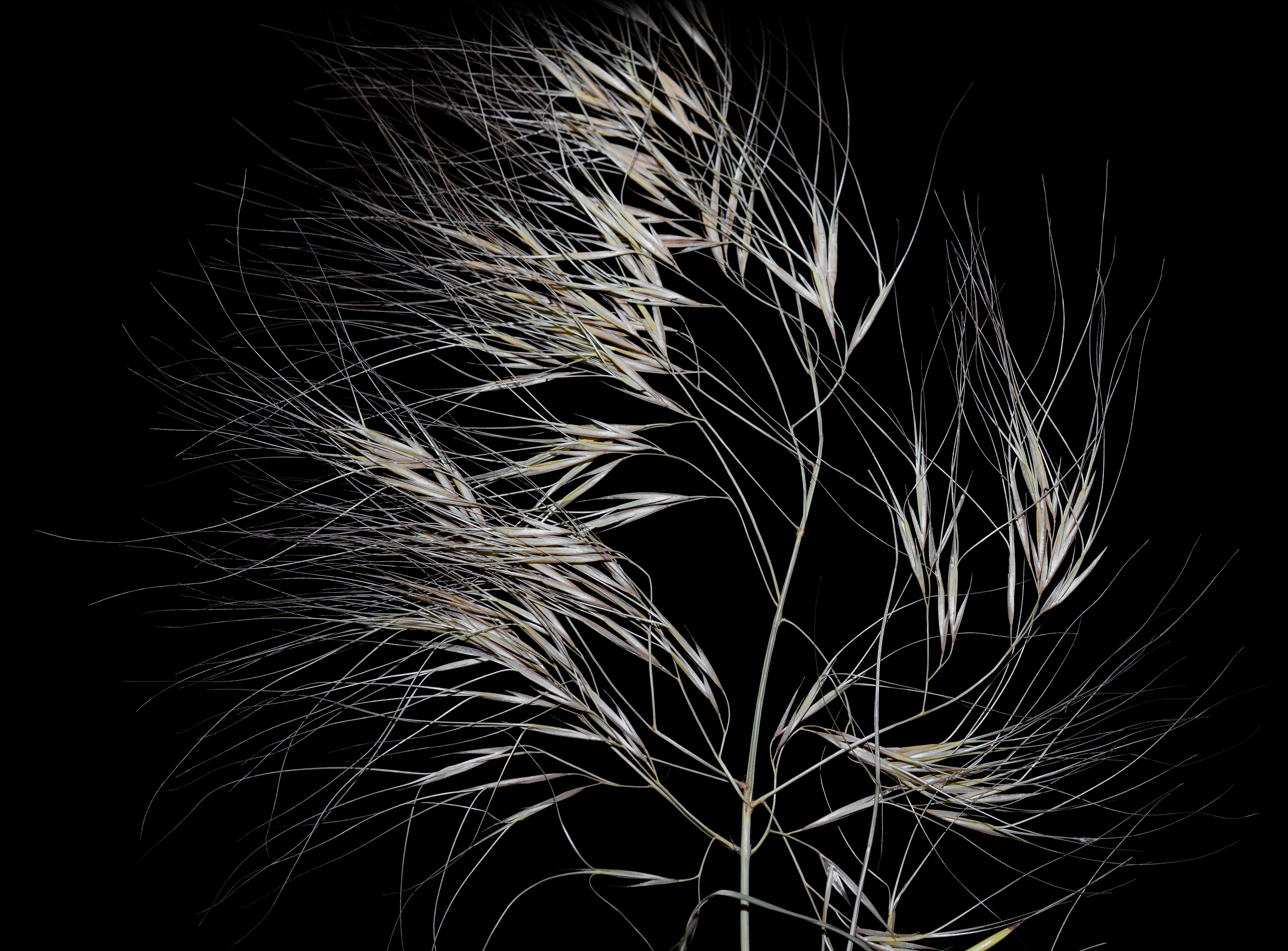
Aristida hystrix L. f. inflorescence

Aristida is a very nearly cosmopolitan genus of plants in the grass family. Aristida is distinguished by having three awns (bristles) on each lemma of each floret. The genus includes about 300 species found worldwide, often in arid warm regions. This genus is among those colloquially called three-awns wiregrasses, speargrasses and needlegrasses. The name Aristida is derived from the Latin "arista", meaning "awn".

They are characteristic of semiarid grassland. The Wiregrass Region of North America is named for A. stricta. Other locales where this genus is an important component of the ecosystem include the Carolina Bays, the sandhills of the Carolinas, and elsewhere, Mulga scrub in Australia, and the xeric grasslands around Lake Turkana in Africa. Local increases in the abundance of wiregrasses is a good indicator of overgrazing, as livestock avoid them.

== Description ==
Aristida stems are ascending to erect, with both basal and cauline leaves. The leaves may be flat or inrolled, and the basal leaves may be tufted. The inflorescences may be either panicle-like or raceme-like, with spiky branches. The glumes of a spikelet are narrow lanceolate, usually without any awns, while the lemmas are hard, three-veined, and have the three awns near the tip. The awns may be quite long; in A. purpurea var. longiseta they may be up to 10 cm.

== Species ==
Selected species include:

- Aristida adscensionis L.
- Aristida anaclasta
- Aristida basiramea – fork-tipped three-awn, forked three-awn
- Aristida behriana F.Muell.
- Aristida beyrichiana - southern wiregrass for which The Wiregrass Area, located in southeast Alabama, North Florida, and southwest Georgia is named.
- Aristida burkei – bohlanya-ba-pere (Sesotho: "horse-madness grass")
- Aristida californica
- Aristida calycina R.Br.
- Aristida capillacea Lam.
- Aristida chaseae
- Aristida congesta
- Aristida contorta F.Muell.
- Aristida dichotoma Michx. – churchmouse threeawn, poverty grass
- Aristida divaricata
- Aristida granitica
- Aristida guayllabambensis
- Aristida junciformis
- Aristida longespica – slim-spiked three-awn
- Aristida oligantha Michx. – prairie three-awn
- Aristida portoricensis – pelos del diablo
- Aristida pungens – drinn
- Aristida purpurascens Poiret – arrowfeather three-awn
- Aristida purpurea – purple three-awn
- Aristida ramosa R.Br.
- Aristida refracta
- Aristida rhizomophora
- Aristida rufescens
- Aristida stricta – pineland three-awn, wiregrass
- Aristida tuberculosa
- Aristida vagans
- Aristida vaginata

== See also ==
- Puccinia aristidae, a plant pathogenic urediniomycete fungus first described from three-awn grass
- List of Poaceae genera
