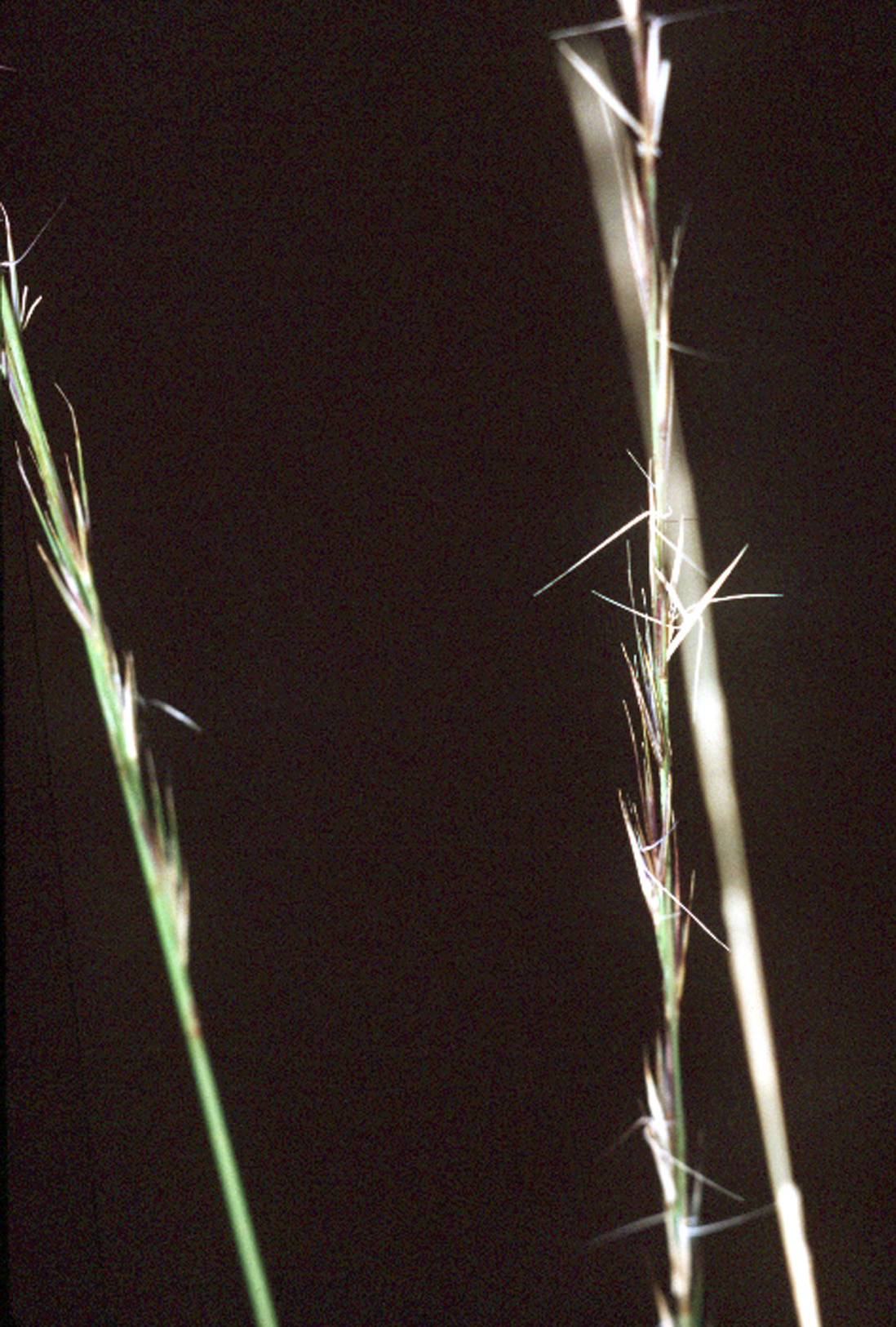

Conservation status
- Secure (NatureServe)

Scientific classification
- Kingdom: Plantae
- Clade: Tracheophytes
- Clade: Angiosperms
- Clade: Monocots
- Clade: Commelinids
- Order: Poales
- Family: Poaceae
- Genus: Aristida
- Species: A. stricta

Binomial name
- Aristida stricta Michx.

= Aristida stricta =

Species of grass

Aristida stricta, known as wiregrass or pineland three-awn grass, is a warm-season grass native to North America. The species dominates understory vegetation in sandhills and flatwoods coastal plain ecosystems of the Carolinas in the Southeastern United States. Its appearance is characterized by villous bristles (indument) on each side of its midrib and on the back of the involute leaf blade.

Aristida stricta ranges in size, but can reach a width of 15 centimeters at the base. The species' leaves are approximately 0.5 meters in length, with two to three leaves per tiller. The seeds of A. stricta are approximately 4.5 millimeters in length and 0.4 millimeters in width; a translucent brown in color.

== Taxonomy and etymology ==
The common name of Aristida stricta, wiregrass, gave rise to the naming of the Wiregrass Region in which it is located. The species was first described by André Michaux in 1803. In 1993, the southern population of the species was split off and described as Aristida beyrichiana because of geographic and morphological differences. The two species were treated as an "Aristida stricta sensu lato species complex". However, a decade later, further anatomical studies suggested that the two species did not have sufficient morphological differences to be considered separate. As of 2024, Plants of the World Online accepted Aristida beyrichiana as separate from A. stricta.

== Ecology ==
Most commonly found in longleaf pine savannas, this is a fast-growing species that regenerates quickly after fires (specimens may experience up to 2.5 centimeters of growth per day following a fire). The plant depends on regular summer burning in order to stimulate flowering and seed production, with May burns resulting in the greatest subsequent abundance of reproductive tiller. Additionally, A. stricta plays a foundational role in the facilitation of burns as its foliage accelerates the spread of lightning-set fires to the rest of the ecosystem.

== Conservation, cultivation, and restoration ==
A. stricta has been observed to have a negative association with agricultural history, as well as with general soil disturbance. However, it has been observed to have a positive association with a system's burn frequency.

There have been efforts to restore wiregrass communities, in which A. stricta is propagated from seed and then planted. A study conducted by the Tall Timbers Research Station found that plugs of A. stricta possessed the ability to dominate a low-density area of land through reproduction over the span of decades.
