= Awn (botany) =

Pointy, hair-like plant structure

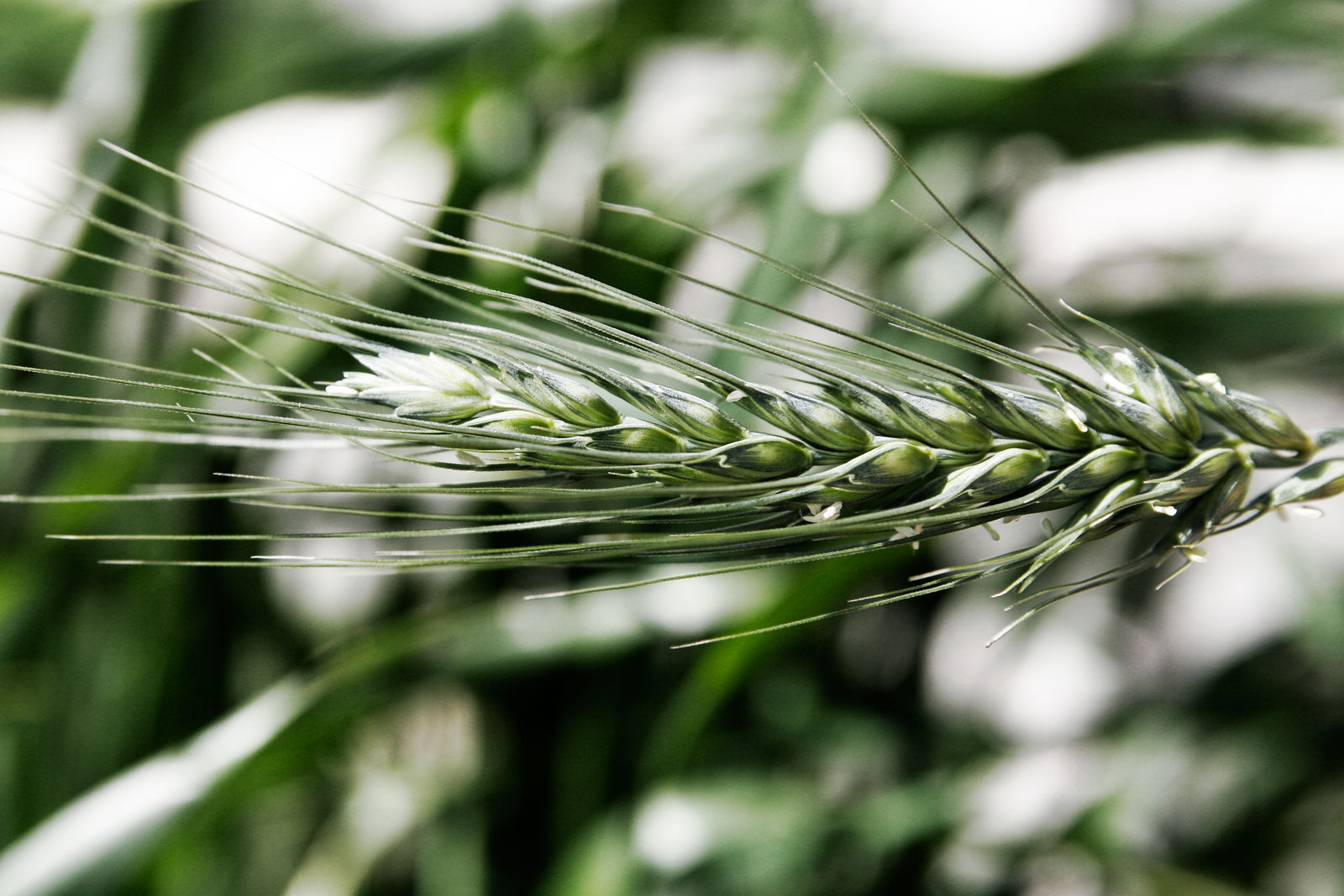
A wild rye ear (spike) with awns

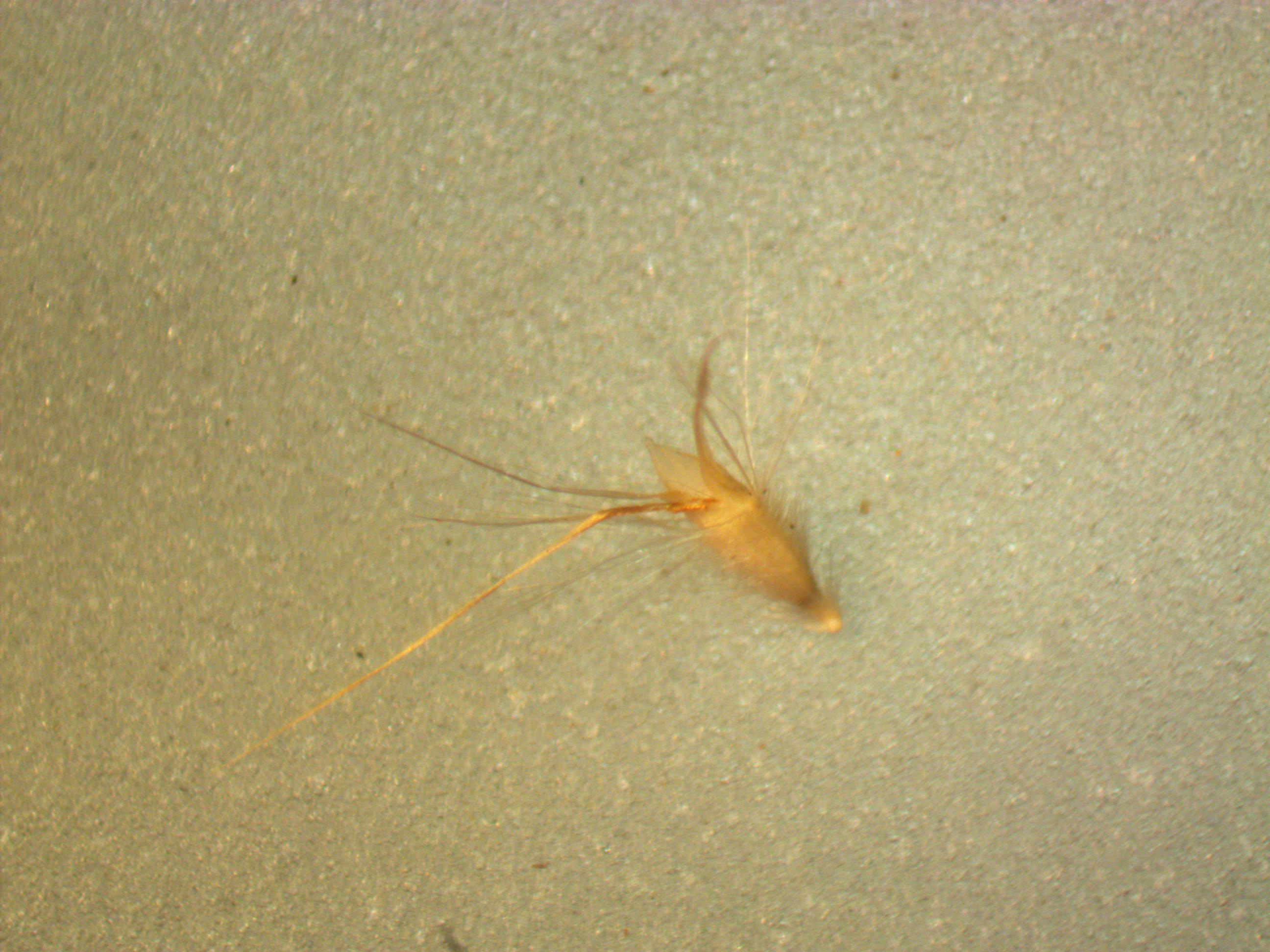
Awns on the fruit of an Australian species of grass

An awn is a hairy or bristle-like growth on a plant.

On the seeds of grasses such as barley or rye, they form foxtails which assist seed dispersal by being barbed and so sticking to passing animals. Also, the awns may twist or curl as they are wetted and dry out and this action can make fallen seeds walk until they fall into a crevice into which they then burrow.

Besides grasses, other families of plants which have awns include Asteraceae such as sunflowers and Geraniaceae such as geraniums. In the latter, the awns help disperse the seeds by developing a tension which then catapults the seeds when the seed head ripens and dries out.

== Description ==
In grasses, awns typically extend from the lemmas of the florets. This often makes the hairy appearance of the grass synflorescence. Awns may be long (several centimeters) or short, straight or curved, single or multiple per floret. Some biological genera are named after their awns, such as the three-awns (Aristida).

In some species, the awns can contribute significantly to photosynthesis, as, for example, in barley.

The awns of wild emmer-wheat spikelets effectively self-cultivate by propelling themselves mechanically into soils. During a period of increased humidity during the night, the awns of the spikelet become erect and draw together, and in the process push the grain into the soil. During the daytime the humidity drops and the awns slacken back again; however, fine silica hairs on the awns act as ratchet hooks in the soil and prevent the spikelets from reversing back out again. During the course of alternating stages of daytime and nighttime humidity, the awns' pumping movements, which resemble swimming frog kick, drill the spikelet as much as an inch into the soil.

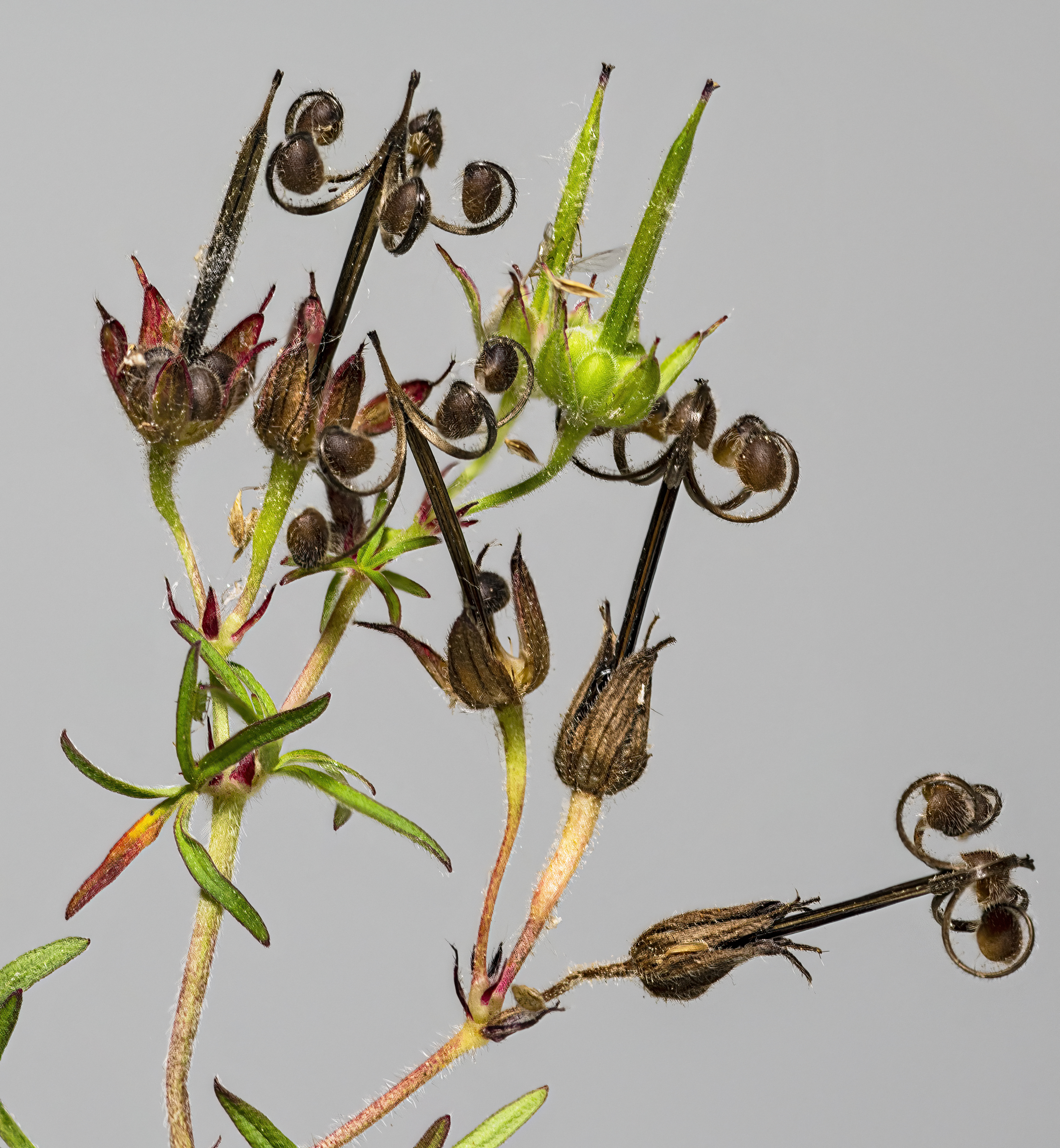
Geranium dissectum fruits, one undischarged, two of which have discharged their seed-bearing carpels by flinging out the seed as the awns dry, shrink, and split off elastically

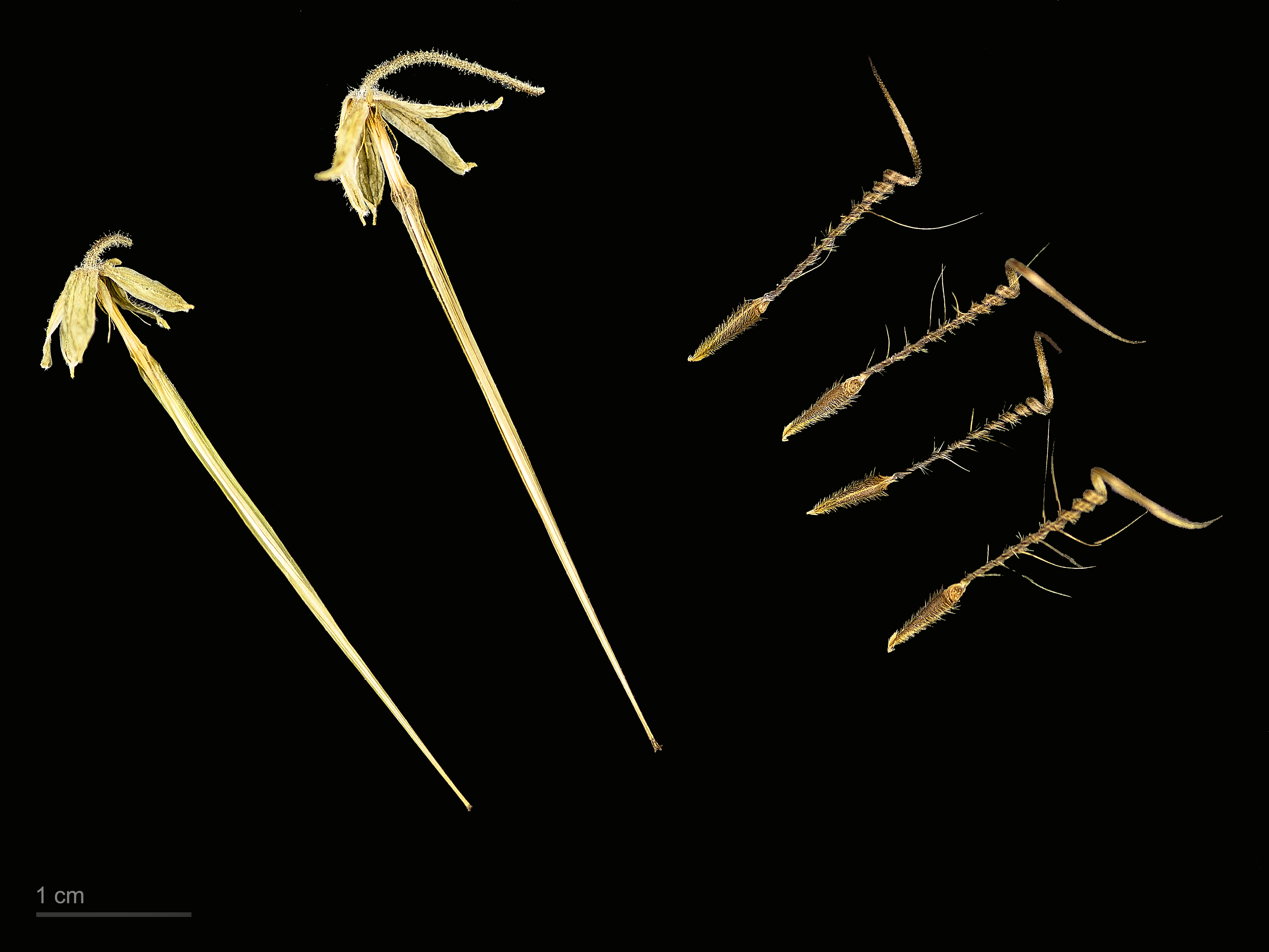
Awns on the carpels of Erodium moschatum that twist as they dry. They might either fling off their seed, or entangle in the coats of animals, or partly bury the seed if they land suitably on soil.

When awns occur in the Geraniaceae, they form the distal (rostral) points of the five carpels, lying parallel in the style above the ovary. Depending on the species, such awns have various seed-dispersal functions, either dispersing the seed by flinging it out (seed ejection); flinging away the entire carpel so that it snaps off (carpel projection); entangling the awn or bristles on passing animals (zoochory); or possibly burying the seed by twisting as it lies on soft soil.
