= Tussock grass =

Informal group of grass species

Tussock grasses (also known as bunch grasses or hummock grasses) are a group of grass species in the family Poaceae. They usually grow as singular plants in clumps, tufts, hummocks, or bunches, rather than forming a sod or lawn, in meadows, grasslands, and prairies. As perennial plants, most species live more than one season. Tussock grasses are often found as forage in pastures and ornamental grasses in gardens.

Many species have long roots that may reach two meters (6 1/2 feet) or more into the soil, which can aid slope stabilization, erosion control, and soil porosity for precipitation absorption. Also, their roots can reach moisture more deeply than other grasses and annual plants during seasonal or climatic droughts. The plants provide habitat and food for insects (including Lepidoptera), birds, small animals and larger herbivores, and support beneficial soil mycorrhiza. The leaves supply material, such as for basket weaving, for indigenous peoples and contemporary artists.

Tussock and bunch grasses occur in almost any habitat where other grasses are found, including: grasslands, savannas and prairies, wetlands and estuaries, riparian zones, shrublands and scrublands, woodlands and forests, montane and alpine zones, tundra and dunes, and deserts.

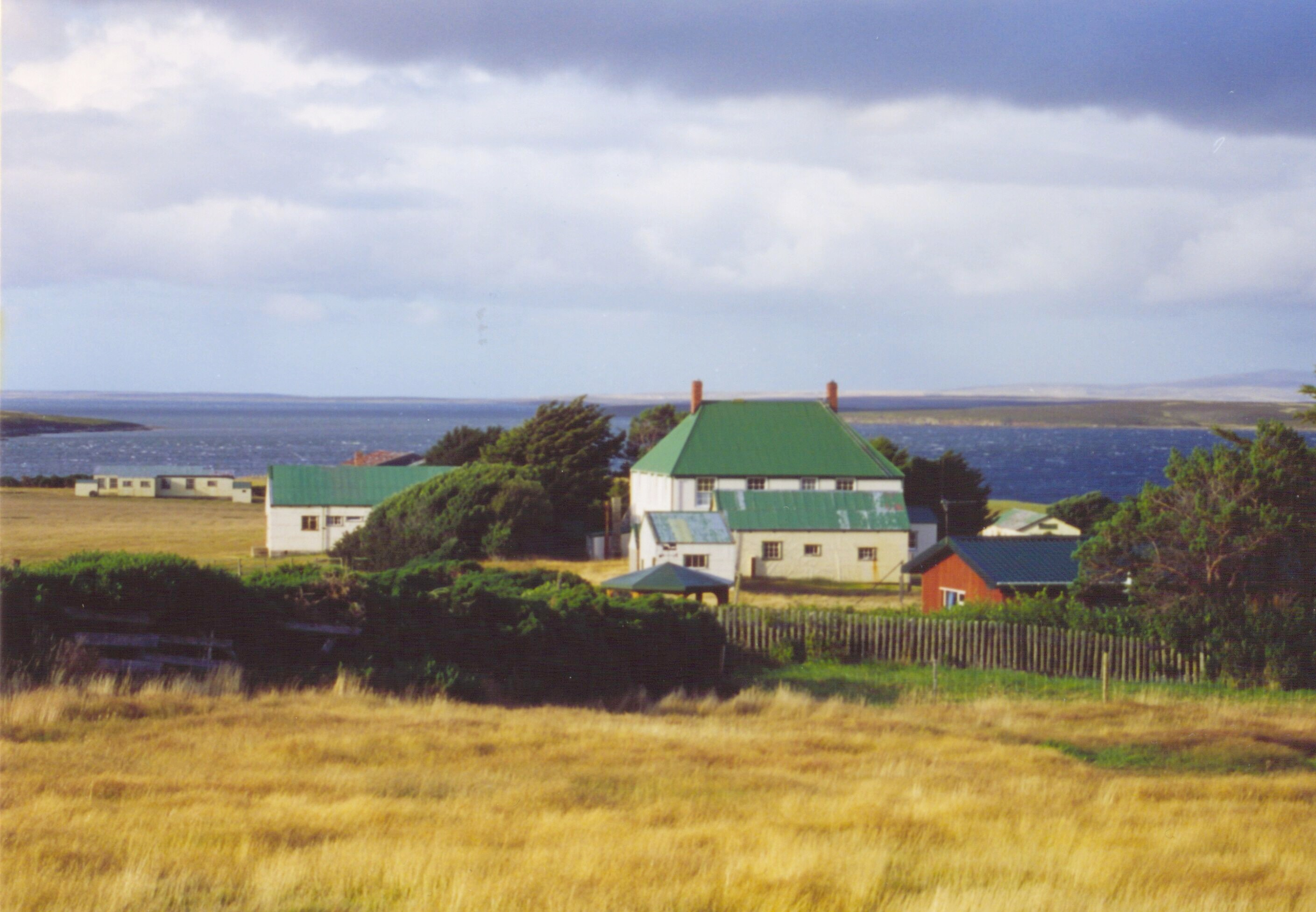
Tussock-bunch grasslands, dormant season, in the Falkland Islands in the south Atlantic

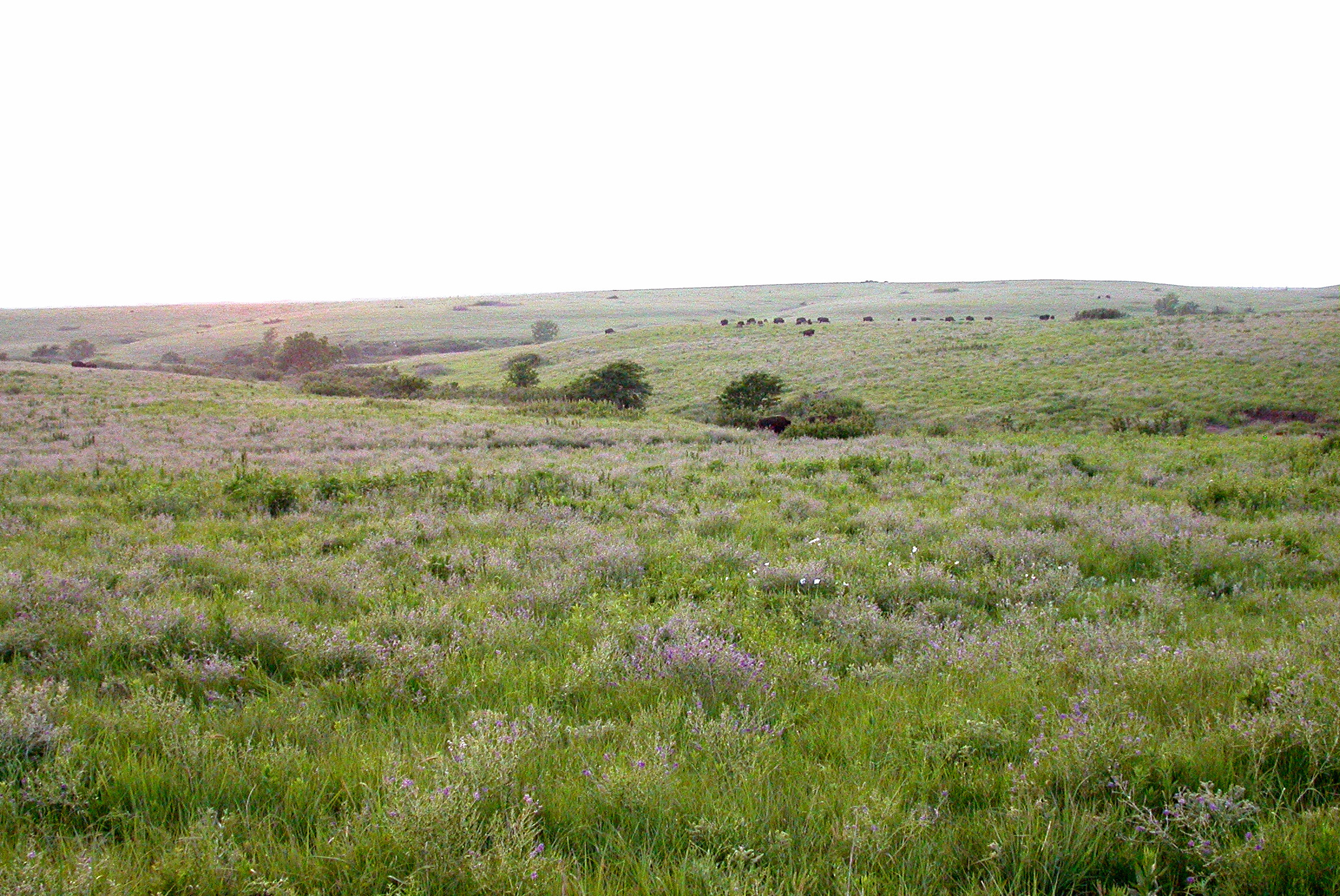
Bunch-tussock grasses in the Konza tallgrass prairie

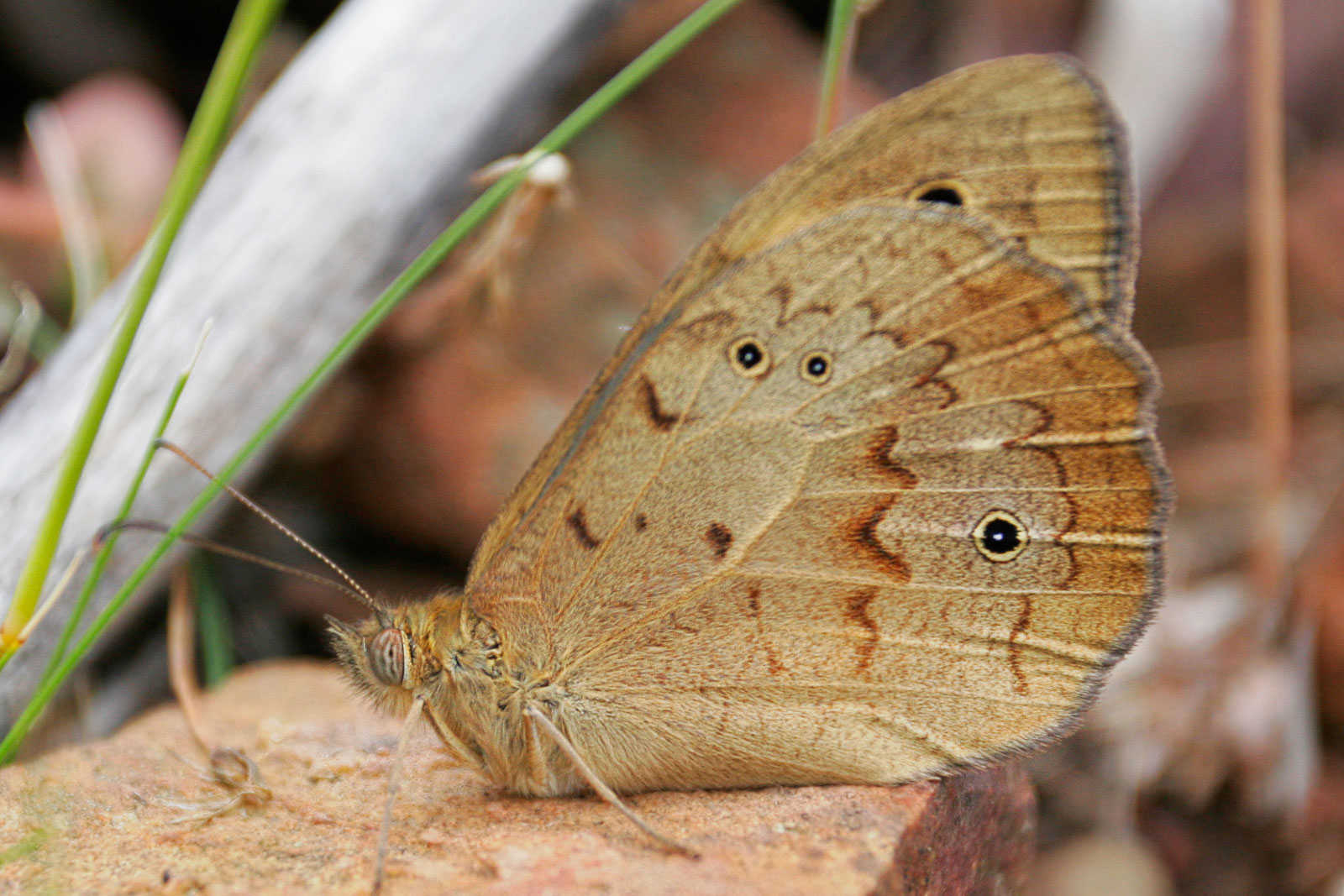
Larvae of the Geitoneura klugii feed on grasses like slender tussock grass, kangaroo grass, and false brome.

== Fire resistance ==
In western North American wildfires, bunch grasses tend to smolder and not ignite into flames, unlike invasive species of annual grasses that contribute to a fire's spreading.

== Genera ==
Examples:

- Alloteropsis (tropical climates)
- Amphipogon (tropical climates)
- Ancistrachne (tropical climates)
- Andropogon (tropical climates)
- Aristida (tropical climates)
- Arundinella (tropical climates)
- Astrebla (tropical climates)
- Bothriochloa (tropical climates)
- Brachypodium (temperate climates)
- Calamagrostis (temperate climates)
- Cenchrus (tropical climates)
- Chionochloa (temperate climates)
- Chloris (tropical climates)
- Chrysopogon (tropical climates)
- Cymbopogon (tropical climates)
- Deschampsia (temperate climates)
- Dichanthium (tropical climates)
- Digitaria (tropical climates)
- Enteropogon (tropical climates)
- Eragrostis (tropical climates)
- Eriachne (tropical climates)
- Eulalia (tropical climates)
- Festuca (temperate climates)
- Heteropogon (tropical climates)
- Leptochloa (tropical climates)
- Leymus (temperate climates)
- Melica (tropical climates)
- Mnesithea (tropical climates)
- Muhlenbergia (temperate climates)
- Nassella (temperate climates)
- Neurachne (tropical climates)
- Ophiuros (tropical climates)
- Oryza (tropical climates)
- Oxychloris (tropical climates)
- Panicum (tropical climates)
- Paraneurachne (tropical climates)
- Paspalidium (tropical climates)
- Sehima (tropical climates)
- Sorghum (tropical climates)
- Sporobolus (tropical climates)
- Stipa (temperate climates)
- Themeda (tropical climates)
- Triodia, formerly Plectrachne (Australia)
- Tripogon (tropical climates)
- Triraphis (tropical climates)
- Xerochloa (tropical climates)
- Yakirra (tropical climates)
- Zygochloa (tropical climates)

== Species ==
=== Australia ===
- Agrostis australiensis
- Agrostis bettyae
- Agrostis muelleriana
- Agrostis parviflora
- Agrostis propinqua
- Agrostis thompsoniae
- Agrostis venusta
- Alloteropsis semialata
- Amphibromus fluitans
- Amphibromus macrorhinus
- Amphibromus neesii
- Amphibromus nervosus
- Amphibromus pithogastrus
- Amphibromus sinuatus
- Amphibromus whitei
- Amphipogon caricinus
- Amphipogon caricinus
- Ancistrachne maidenii
- Ancistrachne uncinulata
- Ancistrachne uncinulata
- Anisopogon avenaceus
- Aristida acuta
- Aristida anthoxanthoides
- Aristida behriana
- Aristida benthamii
- Aristida blakei
- Aristida calycina
- Aristida caput-medusae
- Aristida contorta
- Aristida echinata
- Aristida gracilipes
- Aristida helicophylla
- Aristida holathera
- Aristida inaequiglumis
- Aristida jerichoensis
- Aristida latifolia
- Aristida lazaridis
- Aristida leichhardtiana
- Aristida leptopoda
- Aristida lignosa
- Aristida longicollis
- Aristida muricata
- Aristida nitidula
- Aristida obscura
- Aristida personata
- Aristida platychaeta
- Aristida pruinosa
- Aristida psammophila
- Aristida queenslandica
- Aristida ramosa
- Aristida spuria
- Aristida strigosa
- Aristida vagans
- Aristida warburgii
- Arundinella nepalensis
- Astrebla elymoides
- Astrebla lappacea
- Astrebla pectinata
- Astrebla squarrosa
- Australopyrum pectinatum
- Australopyrum retrofractum
- Australopyrum velutinum
- Austrostipa acrociliata
- Austrostipa aristiglumis
- Austrostipa bigeniculata
- Austrostipa blackii
- Austrostipa densiflora
- Austrostipa drummondii
- Austrostipa elegantissima
- Austrostipa eremophila
- Austrostipa flavescens
- Austrostipa gibbosa
- Austrostipa metatoris
- Austrostipa mollis
- Austrostipa nitida
- Austrostipa nivicola
- Austrostipa nodosa
- Austrostipa nullanulla
- Austrostipa platychaeta
- Austrostipa puberula
- Austrostipa pubescens
- Austrostipa pubinodis
- Austrostipa ramosissima
- Austrostipa rudis
- Austrostipa scabra
- Austrostipa semibarbata
- Austrostipa setacea
- Austrostipa stipoides
- Austrostipa stuposa
- Austrostipa trichophylla
- Austrostipa tuckeri
- Austrostipa variabilis
- Austrostipa verticillata
- Austrostipa wakoolica
- Bothriochloa biloba
- Bothriochloa bladhii
- Bothriochloa decipiens
- Bothriochloa erianthoides
- Bothriochloa ewartiana
- Bothriochloa macra
- Bromus arenarius
- Capillipedium parviflorum
- Capillipedium spicigerum
- Cenchrus caliculatus
- Chionochloa frigida
- Chloris divaricata
- Chloris pectinata
- Chloris truncata
- Chloris ventricosa
- Chrysopogon fallax
- Chrysopogon filipes
- Chrysopogon sylvaticus
- Cleistochloa rigida
- Cleistochloa subjuncea
- Cymbopogon ambiguus
- Cymbopogon bombycinus
- Cymbopogon obtectus
- Cymbopogon refractus
- Dactyloctenium radulans
- Deschampsia cespitosa
- Deyeuxia accedens
- Deyeuxia acuminata
- Deyeuxia affinis
- Deyeuxia angustifolia
- Deyeuxia appressa
- Deyeuxia brachyathera
- Deyeuxia carinata
- Deyeuxia contracta
- Deyeuxia crassiuscula
- Deyeuxia decipiens
- Deyeuxia densa
- Deyeuxia gunniana
- Deyeuxia imbricata
- Deyeuxia innominata
- Deyeuxia mckiei
- Deyeuxia mesathera
- Deyeuxia microseta
- Deyeuxia monticola
- Deyeuxia nudiflora
- Deyeuxia parviseta
- Deyeuxia quadriseta
- Deyeuxia reflexa
- Deyeuxia rodwayi
- Deyeuxia scaberula
- Dicanthium fecundum
- Dichanthium sericeum
- Dichanthium setosum
- Dichanthium tenue
- Dichelachne crinita
- Dichelachne hirtella
- Dichelachne inaequiglumis
- Dichelachne micrantha
- Dichelachne parva
- Dichelachne rara
- Dichelachne sieberiana
- Digitaria ammophila
- Digitaria breviglumis
- Digitaria brownii
- Digitaria coenicola
- Digitaria divaricatissima
- Digitaria hubbardii
- Digitaria hystrichoides
- Digitaria leucostachya
- Digitaria parviflora
- Digitaria porrecta
- Digitaria ramularis
- Diplachne fusca
- Diplachne muelleri
- Diplachne parviflora
- Echinochloa colona
- Echinochloa inundata
- Echinochloa lacunaria
- Echinochloa telmatophila
- Echinopogon caespitosus
- Echinopogon cheelii
- Echinopogon intermedius
- Echinopogon mckiei
- Echinopogon nutans
- Echinopogon ovatus
- Echinopogon phleoides
- Elymus fertilis
- Elymus multiflorus
- Elymus rectisetus
- Elymus scaber
- Elytrophorus spicatus
- Enneapogon avenaceus
- Enneapogon cylindricus
- Enneapogon gracilis
- Enneapogon intermedius
- Enneapogon lindleyanus
- Enneapogon nigricans
- Enneapogon polyphyllus
- Enneapogon truncatus
- Enteropogon acicularis
- Enteropogon ramosus
- Enteropogon unispiceus
- Entolasia marginata
- Entolasia stricta
- Entolasia whiteana
- Eragrostis alveiformis
- Eragrostis australasica
- Eragrostis basedowii
- Eragrostis benthamii
- Eragrostis brownii
- Eragrostis desertorum
- Eragrostis dielsii
- Eragrostis elongata
- Eragrostis eriopoda
- Eragrostis exigua
- Eragrostis falcata
- Eragrostis fallax
- Eragrostis interrupta
- Eragrostis kennedyae
- Eragrostis lacunaria
- Eragrostis laniflora
- Eragrostis lehmanniana
- Eragrostis leptocarpa
- Eragrostis leptostachya
- Eragrostis megalosperma
- Eragrostis microcarpa
- Eragrostis parviflora
- Eragrostis pergracilis
- Eragrostis pubescens
- Eragrostis setifolia
- Eragrostis sororia
- Eragrostis spartinoides
- Eragrostis speciosa
- Eragrostis tenellula
- Eragrostis trachycarpa
- Eragrostis xerophila
- Eremochloa bimaculata
- Eriachne aristidea
- Eriachne benthamii
- Eriachne glabrata
- Eriachne glauca
- Eriachne helmsii
- Eriachne mucronata
- Eriachne obtusa
- Eriachne pallescens
- Eriochloa australiensis
- Eriochloa crebra
- Eriochloa procera
- Eriochloa pseudoacrotricha
- Eulalia aurea
- Festuca asperula
- Festuca muelleri
- Glyceria australis
- Glyceria latispicea
- Gymnoschoenus sphaerocephalus – button grass
- Heteropogon contortus
- Hierochloe rariflora
- Hierochloe redolens
- Homopholis belsonii
- Hookerochloa hookeriana
- Hyparrhenia filipendula
- Imperata cylindrica
- Isachne globosa
- Iseilema membranaceum
- Iseilema vaginiflorum
- Joycea pallida – red anther wallaby grass
- Lachnagrostis aemula
- Lachnagrostis aequata
- Lachnagrostis billardierei
- Lachnagrostis filiformis
- Lachnagrostis meionectes
- Leptochloa decipiens
- Leptochloa digitata
- Leptochloa divaricatissima
- Leptochloa peacockii
- Microlaena stipoides
- Monachather paradoxus
- Neurachne munroi
- Notochloe microdon
- Oxychloris scariosa
- Panicum buncei
- Panicum decompositum
- Panicum effusum
- Panicum laevinode
- Panicum paludosum
- Panicum queenslandicum
- Panicum simile
- Paractaenum novae-hollandiae
- Paspalidium albovillosum
- Paspalidium aversum
- Paspalidium breviflorum
- Paspalidium caespitosum
- Paspalidium constrictum
- Paspalidium criniforme
- Paspalidium distans
- Paspalidium gausum
- Paspalidium globoideum
- Paspalidium gracile
- Paspalidium grandispiculatum
- Paspalidium jubiflorum
- Paspalidium rarum
- Paspalum longifolium
- Paspalum orbiculare
- Pentapogon quadrifidus
- Perotis rara
- Phragmites australis
- Plagiosetum refractum
- Plinthanthesis paradoxa
- Plinthanthesis urvillei
- Poa affinis
- Poa cheelii
- Poa clivicola
- Poa costiniana
- Poa ensiformis
- Poa fawcettiae
- Poa fax
- Poa fordeana
- Poa helmsii
- Poa hiemata
- Poa hookeri
- Poa induta
- Poa labillardierei – common tussock-grass
- Poa meionectes
- Poa petrophila
- Poa phillipsiana
- Poa poiformis
- Poa queenslandica
- Poa saxicola
- Poa sieberiana – grey tussock-grass
- Poa tenera
- Poa triodioides (syn. Austrofestuca littoralis)
- Potamophila parviflora
- Puccinellia stricta
- Rytidosperma australe
- Rytidosperma nivicola
- Rytidosperma nudiflorum
- Rytidosperma oreophilum
- Rytidosperma procerum
- Rytidosperma pumilum
- Rytidosperma vickeryae
- Sacciolepis indica
- Schizachyrium fragile
- Setaria paspalidioides
- Setaria surgens
- Sorghum leiocladum
- Sporobolus actinocladus
- Sporobolus caroli
- Sporobolus contiguus
- Sporobolus creber
- Sporobolus diander
- Sporobolus disjunctus
- Sporobolus elongatus
- Sporobolus laxus
- Sporobolus sessilis
- Tetrarrhena juncea
- Thellungia advena
- Themeda avenacea
- Themeda triandra
- Thyridolepis mitchelliana
- Thyridolepis xerophila
- Tragus australianus
- Tripogon loliiformis
- Triraphis mollis
- Trisetum spicatum
- Uranthoecium truncatum
- Urochloa gilesii
- Urochloa notochthona
- Urochloa piligera
- Urochloa praetervisa
- Urochloa subquadripara
- Walwhalleya proluta
- Walwhalleya subxerophila
- Yakirra australiensis
- Zygochloa paradoxa

=== New Zealand ===
- Chionochloa australis – carpet grass
- Chionochloa flavescens – snow tussock
- Chionochloa oreophila – snow-patch grass
- Chionochloa rubra – red tussock
- Festuca novaezelandiae – fescue tussock or hard tussock
- Poa cita – silver tussock
- Poa colensoi – blue tussock
- Poa foliosa – muttonbird poa

=== North America ===
Bunch grasses:

- Aristida purpurea – purple three-awn
- Bouteloua gracilis – blue grama
- Calamagrostis foliosa – leafy reedgrass (endemic to California)
- Calamagrostis nutkaensis – Pacific reedgrass
- Calamagrostis purpurascens – purple reedgrass
- Danthonia californica – California oatgrass
- Eriocoma lettermanii – Letterman's needlegrass
- Eriophorum vaginatum – hare's-tail cottongrass
- Festuca californica – California fescue
- Festuca idahoensis – Idaho fescue
- Festuca rubra – red fescue
- Koeleria macrantha – junegrass
- Leymus condensatus – giant wildrye
- Melica californica – California melic
- Melica imperfecta – smallflower melic
- Muhlenbergia rigens – deer grass
- Nassella lepida – foothill needlegrass
- Nassella pulchra – purple needlegrass (the state grass of California)
- Poa secunda – pine bluegrass
- Sporobolus heterolepis – prairie dropseed
- Sporobolus virginicus – salt couch grass
- Tripsacum dactyloides – eastern gamagrass

=== South America ===
- Deschampsia cespitosa – tufted hair-grass (up through North America)
- Nassella trichotoma – serrated tussock (common pasture weed in Australia)
- Poa flabellata – tussac grass (synonyms: Parodiochloa flabellata, Festuca flabellata, Dactylis caespitosa)

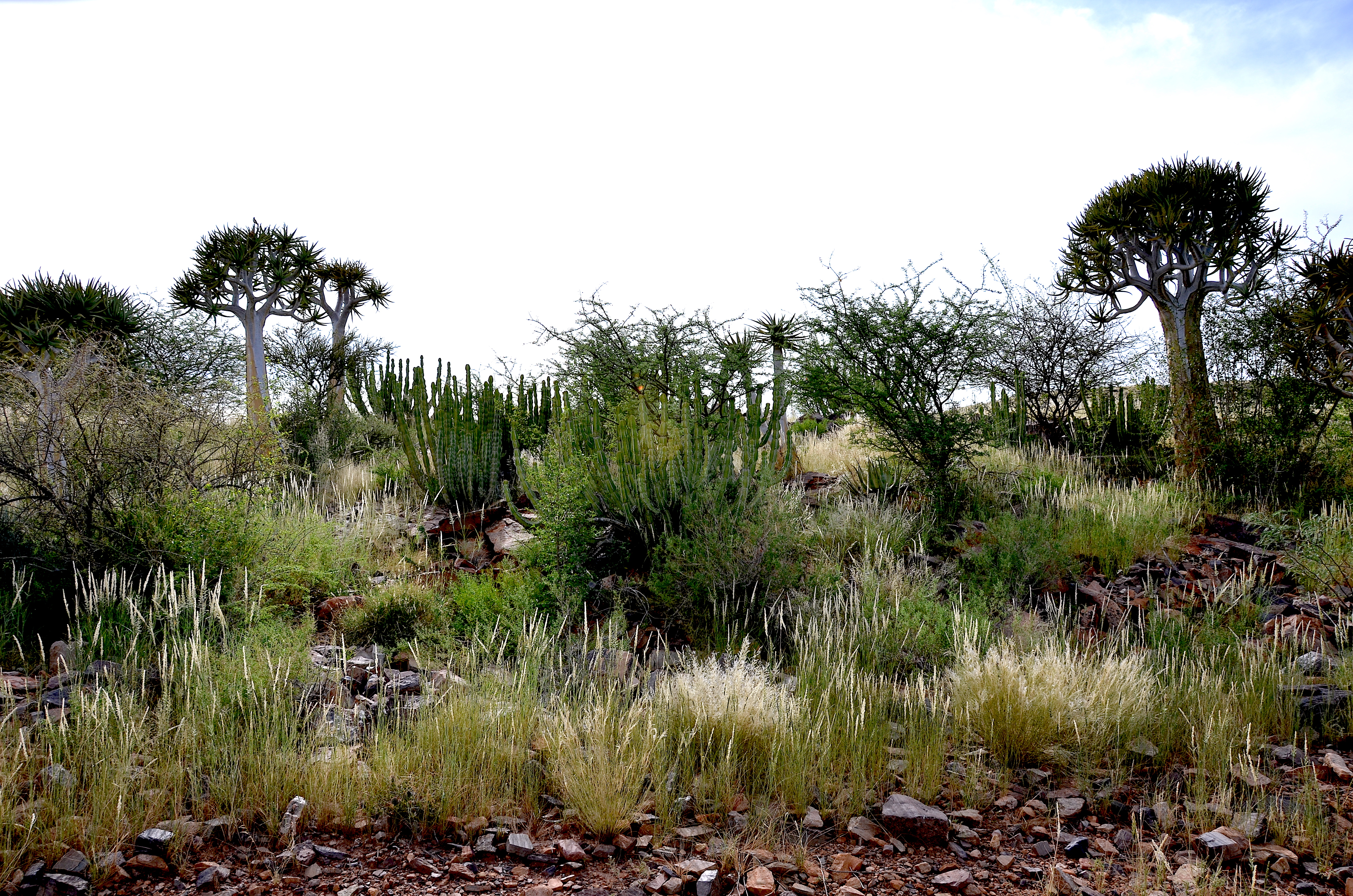
Tussock and various types of flora near Keetmanshoop in Namibia

=== Africa ===
- Heteropogon contortus – perennial tussock grass (to Asia, Australasia, Oceania)

=== Europe ===
- Ampelodesmos mauritanicus – rope grass
- Brachypodium sylvaticum – false-brome
- Molinia caerulea – purple moor grass (to west Asia and north Africa)

== See also ==
- List of Poaceae genera
- Tussock grassland

=== Non-Poaceae tussocks ===
- Carex appropinquata – fibrous tussock-sedge
- Carex stricta – tussock sedge
- Gahnia aspera – rough saw-sedge
