= Austrostipa crinita =

Scientific classification
- Kingdom: Plantae
- Clade: Tracheophytes
- Clade: Angiosperms
- Clade: Monocots
- Clade: Commelinids
- Order: Poales
- Family: Poaceae
- Subfamily: Pooideae
- Genus: Austrostipa
- Species: A. crinita

Binomial name
- Austrostipa crinita (Gaudich.) S.W.L.Jacobs & J.Everett

Species of grass

Austrostipa crinita is a species of grass that grows in coastal parts of midwest Western Australia.

== Description ==
It is a tufted perennial bunchgrass from 40 centimetres to 70 centimetres in height. Flowers are yellow or brown. It reproduces asexually by short rhizomes.

== Taxonomy ==
It was first collected from Shark Bay in Western Australia by Charles Gaudichaud-Beaupré, botanist to the expedition of Louis de Freycinet. It was published by Gaudichaud-Beaupré in 1829 under the name Stipa crinita. That name remained current until 1996, when the Australian species of Stipa were recognised as meriting their own genus. Thus Austrostipa was erected, and this and other species were transferred into it.

== Distribution and habitat ==
It occurs on sand and limestone in coastal areas of midwest Western Australia, including offshore islands such as those of the Houtman Abrolhos.
