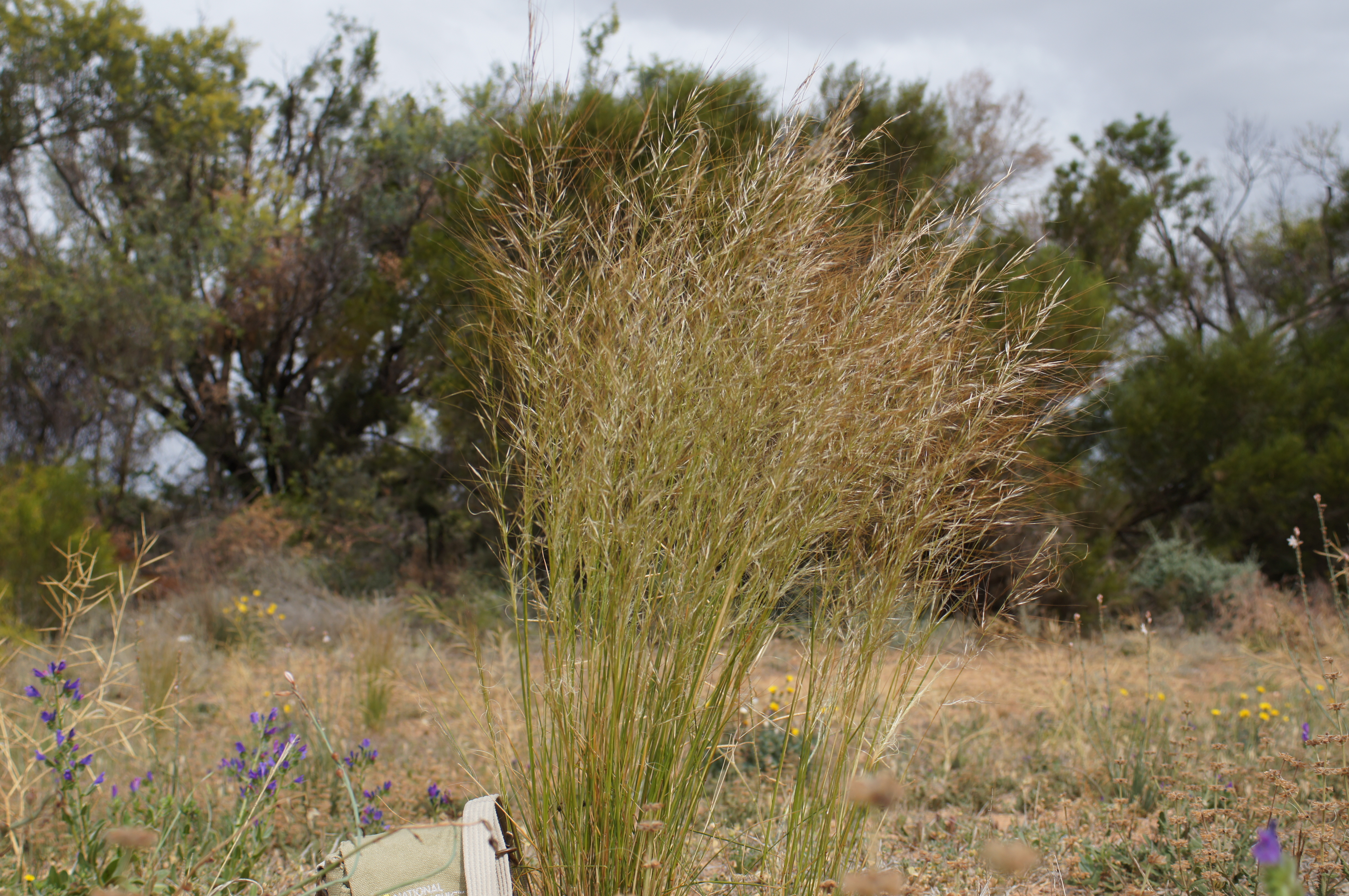

Scientific classification
- Kingdom: Plantae
- Clade: Tracheophytes
- Clade: Angiosperms
- Clade: Monocots
- Clade: Commelinids
- Order: Poales
- Family: Poaceae
- Subfamily: Pooideae
- Genus: Austrostipa
- Species: A. nodosa

Binomial name
- Austrostipa nodosa (S.T.Blake) S.W.L.Jacobs & J.Everett

Synonyms
- Stipa nodosa S.T.Blake

= Austrostipa nodosa =

Species of grass

Austrostipa nodosa is a widespread grass species found in Australia and New Zealand. This bunchgrass can grow up to 1.0 metre (3.3 ft) in height and typically flowers after rain.
