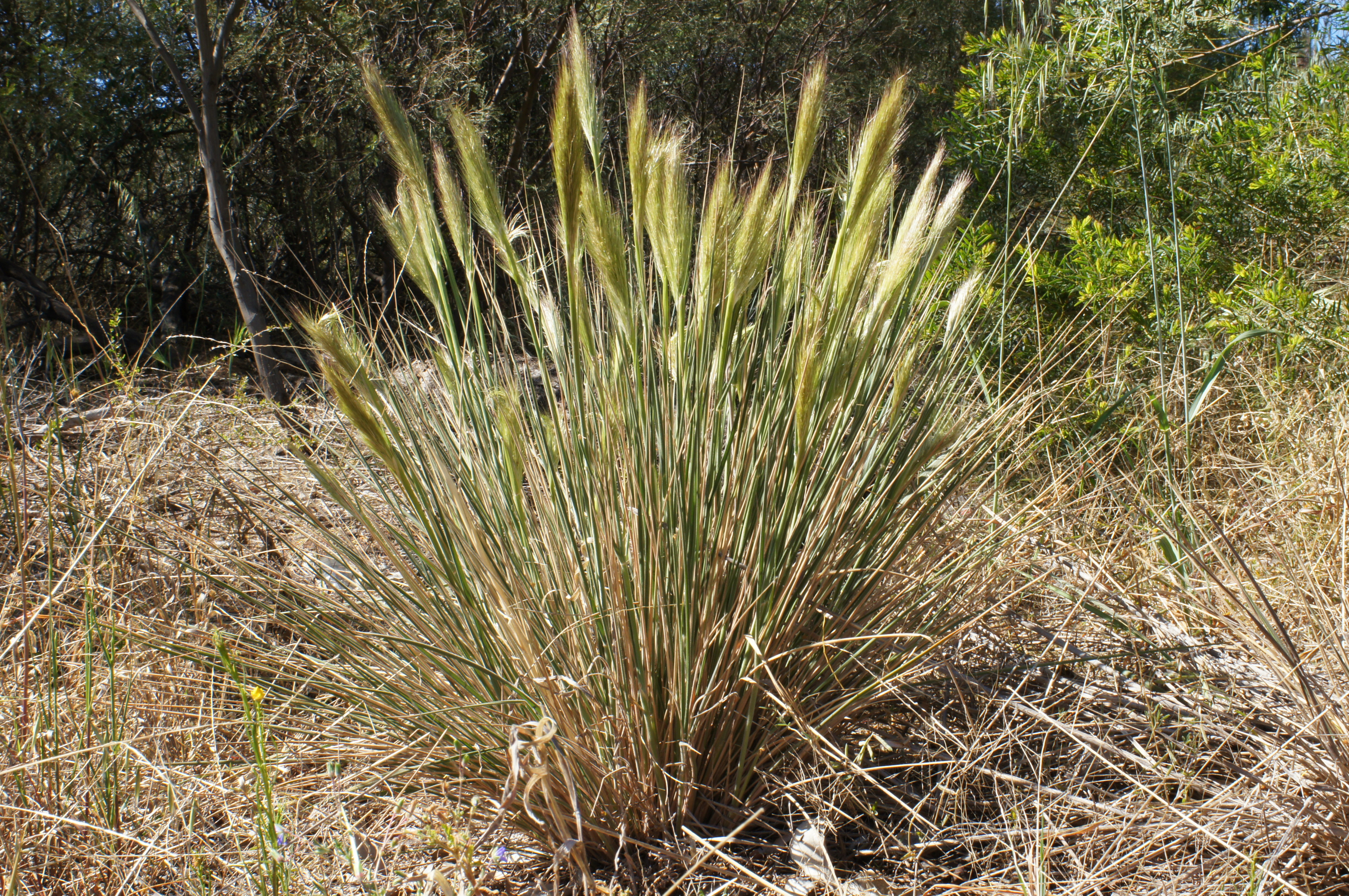
- Wagga Wagga, Australia

Scientific classification
- Kingdom: Plantae
- Clade: Tracheophytes
- Clade: Angiosperms
- Clade: Monocots
- Clade: Commelinids
- Order: Poales
- Family: Poaceae
- Subfamily: Pooideae
- Genus: Austrostipa
- Species: A. densiflora

Binomial name
- Austrostipa densiflora (Hughes) S.W.L.Jacobs & J.Everett

Synonyms
- Stipa densiflora D.K.Hughes.

= Austrostipa densiflora =

Species of grass

Austrostipa densiflora is a widespread species of grass found in south eastern Australia. This bunchgrass may reach 1.5 metres (4.9 ft) tall. Often found on rocky, poor quality soils in woodland.
