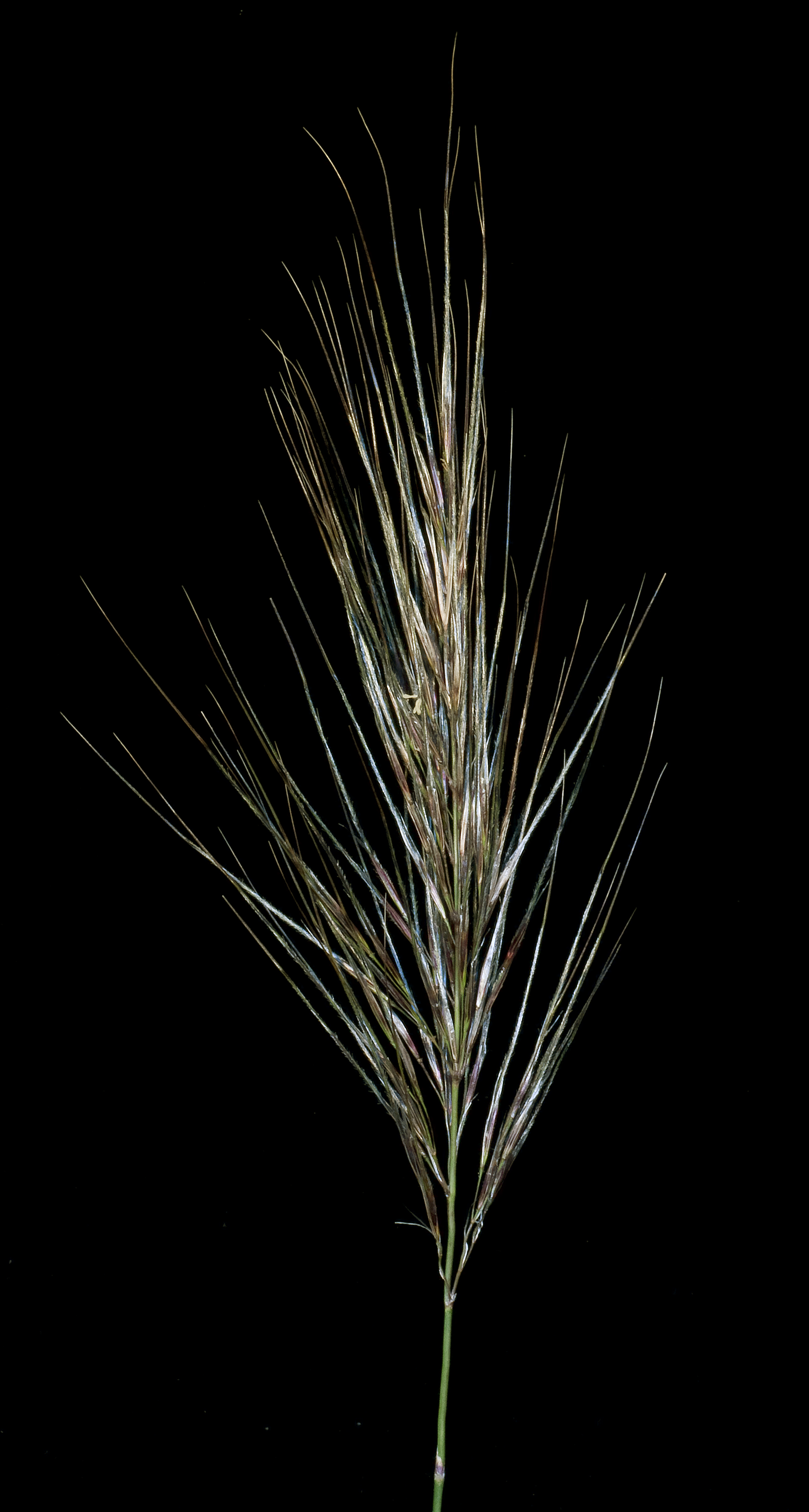

Scientific classification
- Kingdom: Plantae
- Clade: Tracheophytes
- Clade: Angiosperms
- Clade: Monocots
- Clade: Commelinids
- Order: Poales
- Family: Poaceae
- Subfamily: Pooideae
- Genus: Austrostipa
- Species: A. hemipogon

Binomial name
- Austrostipa hemipogon (Benth.) S.W.L.Jacobs & J.Everett

Synonyms
- Stipa hemipogon Benth.

= Austrostipa hemipogon =

Species of plant

Austrostipa hemipogon is a tufted, perennial grass (a member of the family Poaceae. It is native to Australia, and found in Western Australia, South Australia, Victoria, and Tasmania.

It was first described as Stipa hemipogon by George Bentham in 1878 from a specimen collected in Western Australia by James Drummond and in 1996 was transferred to the genus, Austrostipa, by Surrey Jacobs and Joy Everett.
