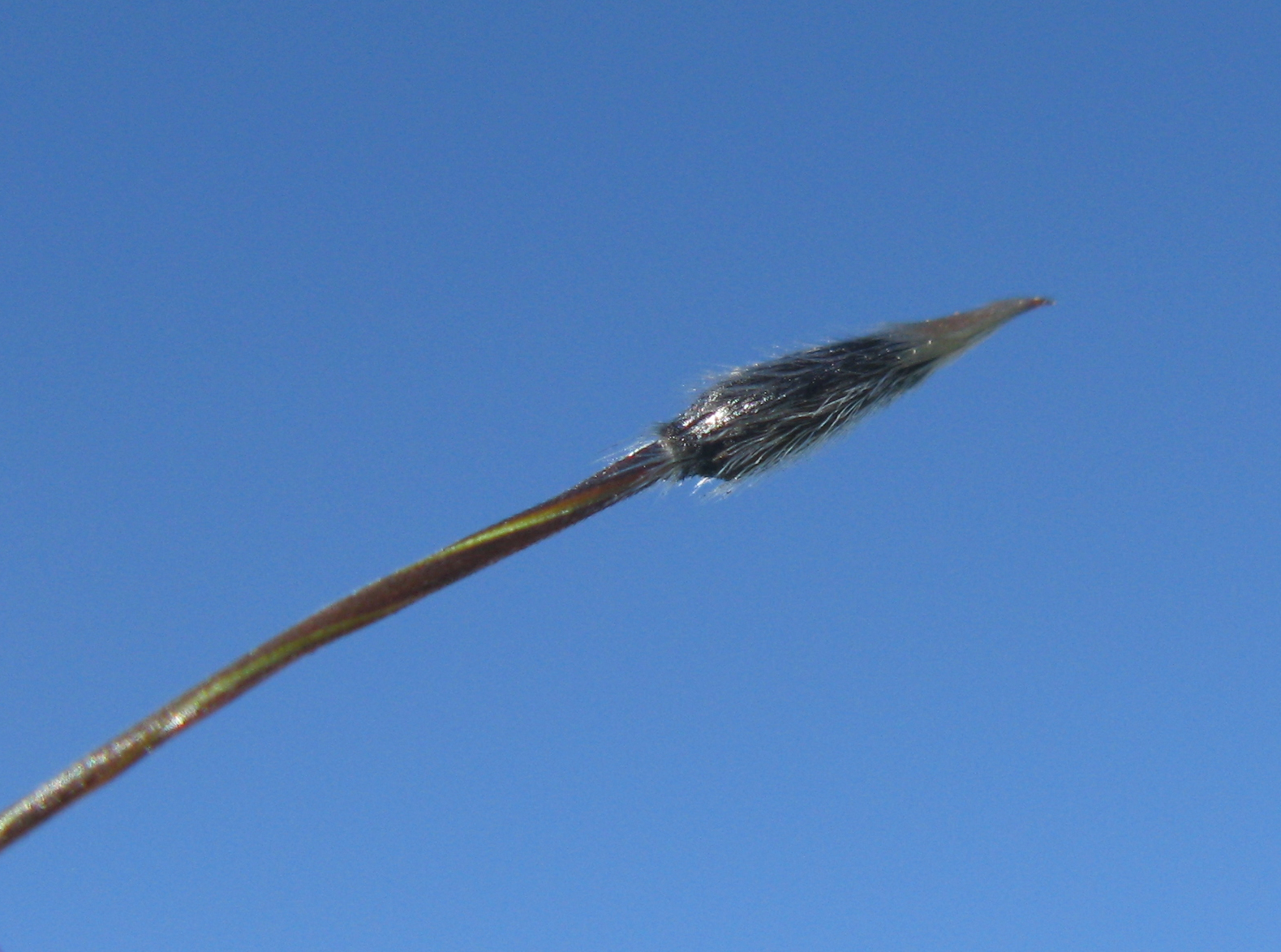

Scientific classification
- Kingdom: Plantae
- Clade: Tracheophytes
- Clade: Angiosperms
- Clade: Monocots
- Clade: Commelinids
- Order: Poales
- Family: Poaceae
- Subfamily: Pooideae
- Genus: Austrostipa
- Species: A. setacea

Binomial name
- Austrostipa setacea (R.Br.) S.W.L.Jacobs & J.Everett

Synonyms
- Stipa setacea R.Br.

= Austrostipa setacea =

Species of grass

Austrostipa setacea, the corkscrew bamboo grass, is found in many areas of inland Australia. This bunchgrass may reach 0.8 metres (2.6 ft) height. Flowering may occur at any time of the year. This is one of the many plants first published by Robert Brown with the type known as "(J.D.) v.v." Appearing in his Prodromus Florae Novae Hollandiae et Insulae Van Diemen in 1810. The specific epithet setacea is derived from Latin, referring to the bristly leaves.
