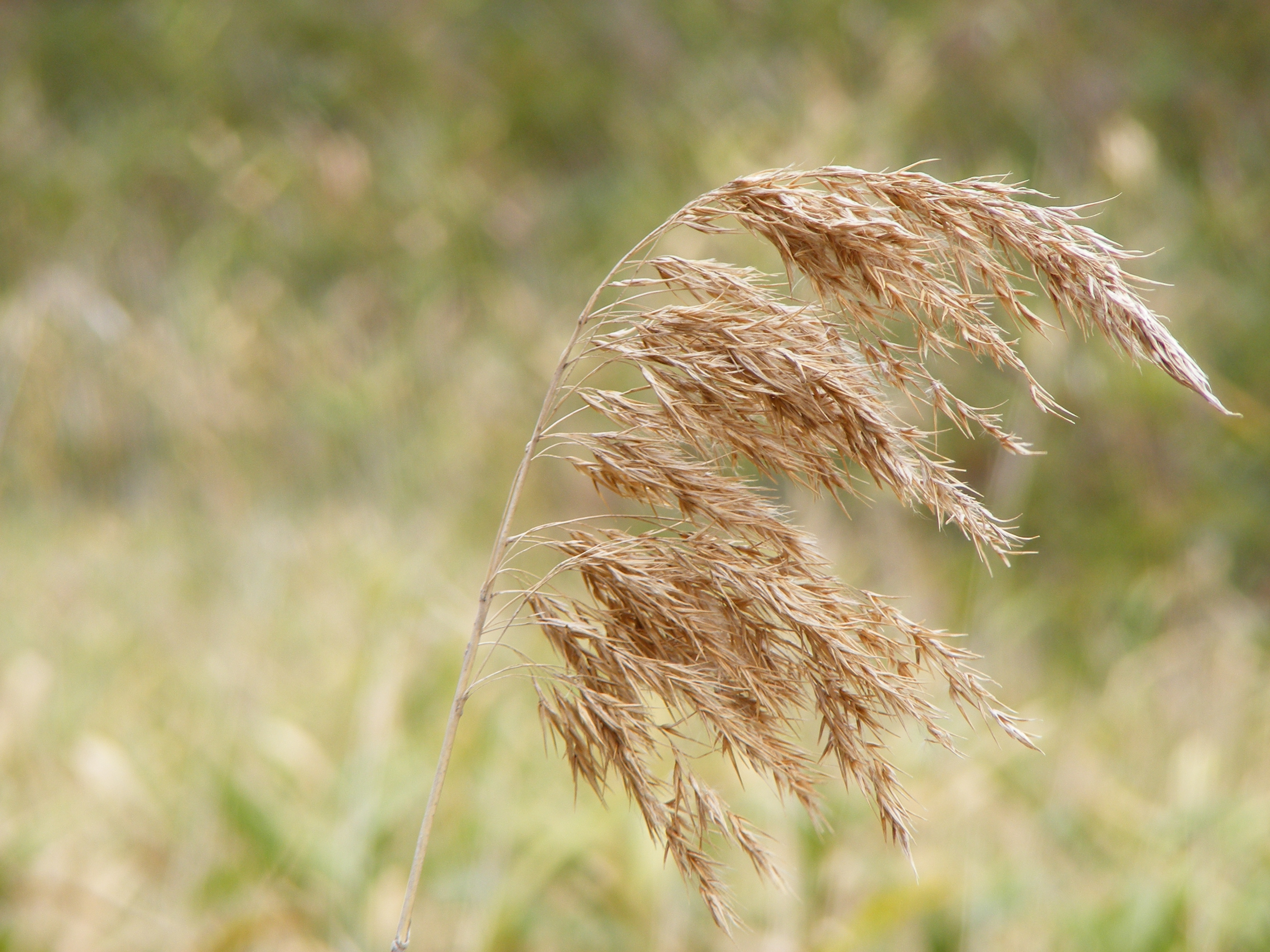
- Austrostipa nodosa

Scientific classification
- Kingdom: Plantae
- Clade: Tracheophytes
- Clade: Angiosperms
- Clade: Monocots
- Clade: Commelinids
- Order: Poales
- Family: Poaceae
- Subfamily: Pooideae
- Supertribe: Stipodae
- Tribe: Stipeae
- Genus: Austrostipa; S.W.L.Jacobs & J.Everett

Type species
- Austrostipa mollis (R.Br.) S.W.L.Jacobs & J.Everett

= Austrostipa =

Speargrass

Genus of grasses

Austrostipa is a primarily Australian genus of plants in the grass family, commonly called speargrass.

The genus includes species formerly included in the genus Stipa. All known species are native to Australia, most of them found nowhere else. One species (A. variabilis) is, however, found in South Africa as well as in Australia, and two species (A. setacea and A. stipoides) are native to Australia and New Zealand. The group likely originated in Australia approximately 20 million years ago.

Species

- Austrostipa acrociliata
- Austrostipa aphylla
- Austrostipa aquarii
- Austrostipa aristiglumis
- Austrostipa bigeniculata
- Austrostipa blackii
- Austrostipa blakei
- Austrostipa breviglumis
- Austrostipa bronwenae
- Austrostipa campylachne
- Austrostipa centralis
- Austrostipa compressa
- Austrostipa crinita
- Austrostipa curticoma
- Austrostipa densiflora
- Austrostipa dongicola
- Austrostipa drummondii
- Austrostipa echinata
- Austrostipa elegantissima (feather speargrass)
- Austrostipa eremophila
- Austrostipa exilis
- Austrostipa feresetacea
- Austrostipa flavescens (coast speargrass)
- Austrostipa geoffreyi
- Austrostipa gibbosa
- Austrostipa hemipogon
- Austrostipa jacobsiana
- Austrostipa juncifolia
- Austrostipa lanata
- Austrostipa macalpinei
- Austrostipa metatoris
- Austrostipa mollis (soft speargrass)
- Austrostipa muelleri
- Austrostipa multispiculis
- Austrostipa mundula
- Austrostipa nitida
- Austrostipa nivicola
- Austrostipa nodosa
- Austrostipa nullanulla (club speargrass)
- Austrostipa nullarborensis
- Austrostipa oligostachya
- Austrostipa petraea
- Austrostipa pilata
- Austrostipa platychaeta (flatawn speargrass)
- Austrostipa plumigera
- Austrostipa puberula
- Austrostipa pubescens
- Austrostipa pubinodis
- Austrostipa pycnostachya
- Austrostipa ramosissima (stout bamboo grass)
- Austrostipa rudis
- Austrostipa scabra (speargrass)
- Austrostipa semibarbata
- Austrostipa setacea (corkscrew grass)
- Austrostipa stipoides (prickly speargrass)
- Austrostipa stuposa
- Austrostipa tenuifolia
- Austrostipa trichophylla
- Austrostipa tuckeri
- Austrostipa variabilis
- Austrostipa velutina
- Austrostipa verticillata (slender bamboo grass)
- Austrostipa vickeryana
- Austrostipa wakoolica
