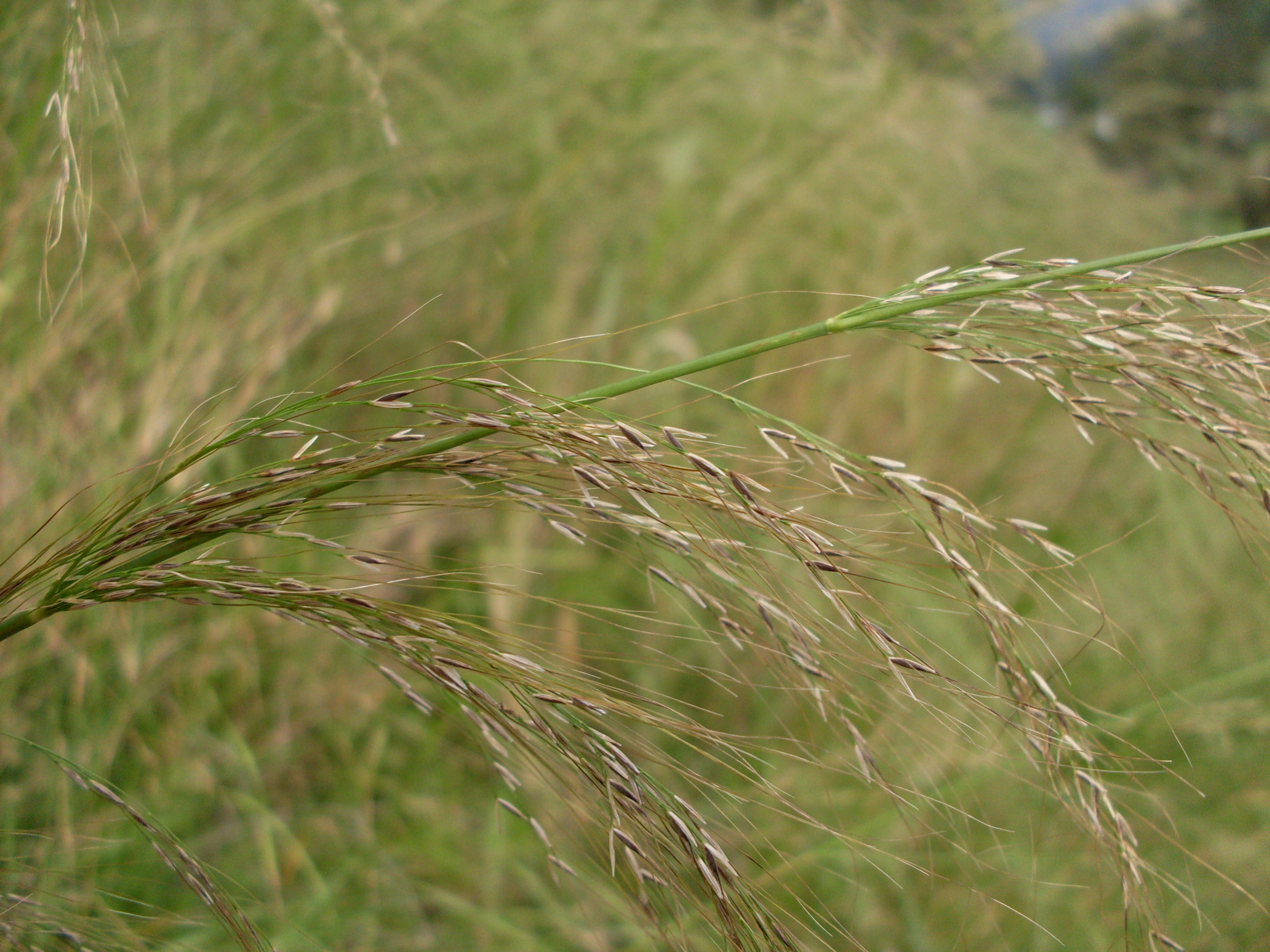
- Goulburn River National Park, Australia

Scientific classification
- Kingdom: Plantae
- Clade: Tracheophytes
- Clade: Angiosperms
- Clade: Monocots
- Clade: Commelinids
- Order: Poales
- Family: Poaceae
- Subfamily: Pooideae
- Genus: Austrostipa
- Species: A. ramosissima

Binomial name
- Austrostipa ramosissima (Trin.) S.W.L.Jacobs & J.Everett

Synonyms
- Stipa ramosissima (Trin.) Trin.

= Austrostipa ramosissima =

Species of grass

Austrostipa ramosissima, the stout bamboo grass, grows in moist areas in eastern Australia. It is often found in well-drained habitats in eucalyptus woodlands or forests.

The bunchgrass may reach 2.5 metres (8.2 ft) tall. Flowering may occur at any time of the year.

== Cultivation ==
Austrostipa ramosissima is cultivated as an ornamental grass by plant nurseries, for use in gardens and drought tolerant landscaping. It is planted in the ground and in pots.
