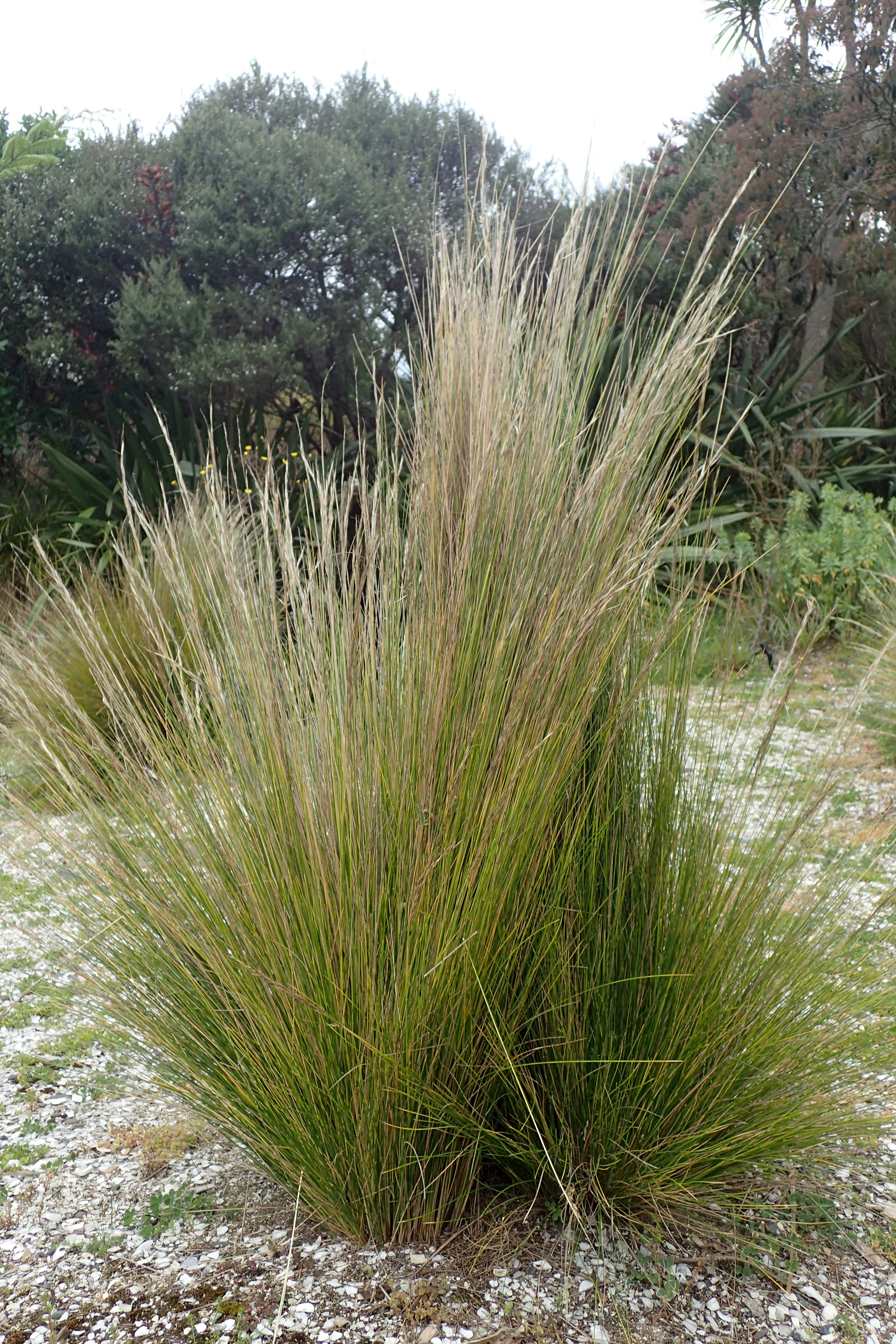

Scientific classification
- Kingdom: Plantae
- Clade: Tracheophytes
- Clade: Angiosperms
- Clade: Monocots
- Clade: Commelinids
- Order: Poales
- Family: Poaceae
- Subfamily: Pooideae
- Genus: Austrostipa
- Species: A. stipoides

Binomial name
- Austrostipa stipoides (Hook.f.) S.W.L.Jacobs & J.Everett

= Austrostipa stipoides =

Species of grass

Austrostipa stipoides, commonly known as prickly spear-grass or coast spear-grass, is a kind of tussock grass native to the coasts of south-eastern Australia and of New Zealand. It forms large clumps up to about 80 cm in height with smooth inrolled leaves 70 cm long and 1 mm wide with sharp tips. It is found on sea cliffs, the edges of beach dunes and salt marshes and tolerates strong winds and sea spray.
