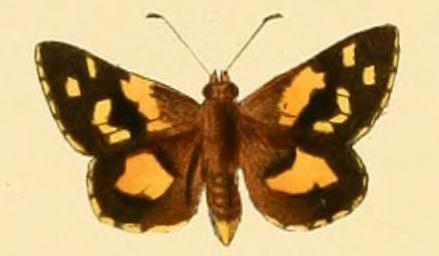

Scientific classification
- Kingdom: Animalia
- Phylum: Arthropoda
- Clade: Pancrustacea
- Class: Insecta
- Order: Lepidoptera
- Family: Hesperiidae
- Genus: Croitana
- Species: C. croites

Binomial name
- Croitana croites (Hewitson, [1874])

Synonyms
- Cyclopides croites Hewitson, 1874; Mesodina croites pindar Waterhouse, 1932

= Croitana croites =

Species of butterfly

Croitana croites, the croites skipper or yellow sand skipper, is a butterfly of the family Hesperiidae. It is endemic to the western plateau and the north-west and south-west coast of the state of Western Australia.

The wingspan is about 25 mm.

The larvae feed on Austrostipa elegantissima, Austrostipa platychaeta and Austrostipa flavescens.
