= Austrostipa compressa =

Scientific classification
- Kingdom: Plantae
- Clade: Tracheophytes
- Clade: Angiosperms
- Clade: Monocots
- Clade: Commelinids
- Order: Poales
- Family: Poaceae
- Subfamily: Pooideae
- Genus: Austrostipa
- Species: A. compressa

Binomial name
- Austrostipa compressa (R.Br.) S.W.L.Jacobs & J.Everett

Synonyms
- Stipa compressa R.Br.

Species of grass

Austrostipa compressa, the compact needlegrass, originally described as Stipa compressa, is a species of grass that grows in south west Western Australia.

It is found in sandy areas near the coast.

It also very similar to golden stipa (A. macalpinei).

The grass is a post disturbance variety – coming up after a fire, or track grading.

The Australian species of Stipa were recognised as a genus in 1996 as Austrostipa.
