= C. arenaria =

C. arenaria may refer to:

- Carex arenaria, the sand sedge, a plant species
- Catinella arenaria, the sandbowl snail, a small air-breathing land snail species
- Cicindela arenaria, a ground beetle species native to the Palearctic Europe
- Croitana arenaria, the inland sand-skipper, a butterfly species endemic to the Northern Territory and South Australia

== See also ==
- Arenaria (disambiguation)
