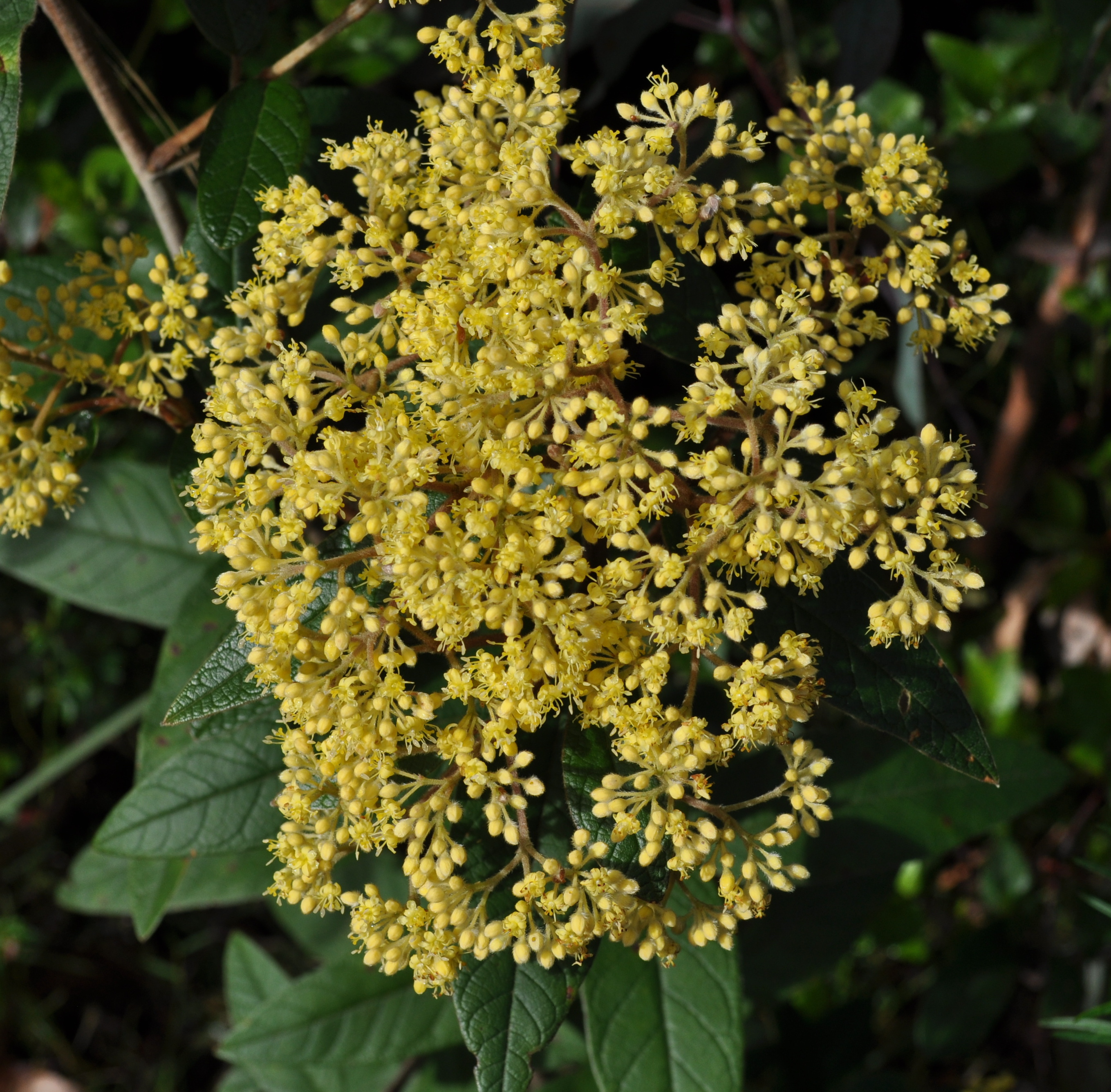
- Pomaderris intermedia near Orbost

Scientific classification
- Kingdom: Plantae
- Clade: Tracheophytes
- Clade: Angiosperms
- Clade: Eudicots
- Clade: Rosids
- Order: Rosales
- Family: Rhamnaceae
- Genus: Pomaderris
- Species: P. intermedia

Binomial name
- Pomaderris intermedia Sieber ex DC.

Synonyms
- Pomaderris sieberiana N.A.Wakef.; Pomaderris affinis N.A.Wakef.; Pomaderris sieberana S.W.L.Jacobs & J.Pickard orth. var.

= Pomaderris intermedia =

Lemon dogwood

Species of flowering plant

Pomaderris intermedia, commonly known as lemon dogwood, is a species of flowering plant in the family Rhamnaceae and is endemic to south-eastern Australia. It is a shrub with hairy stems, elliptic to egg-shaped leaves, and clusters of yellow flowers.

== Description ==
Pomaderris intermedia is a shrub that typically grows to a height of up to about 3 m (9.8 ft), its branchlets covered with both simple and star-shaped hairs. The leaves are broadly elliptic to narrowly egg-shaped, 30–100 mm (1.2–3.9 in) long and 10–50 mm (0.39–1.97 in) wide with stipules 3–8 mm (0.12–0.31 in) long at the base but that fall off as the leaf develops. The upper surface of the leaves is glabrous and the lower surface covered with greyish, star-shaped hairs. The flowers are yellow and arranged in pyramid-shaped to hemispherical panicles 40–150 mm (1.6–5.9 in) long, each flower on a pedicel 2–5 mm (0.079–0.197 in) long with bracts at the base but that fall off as the flower opens. The floral cup is 1.0–1.5 mm (0.039–0.059 in) long, the sepals 2–3 mm (0.079–0.118 in) long but fall off as the flowers open, and the petals are spatula-shaped and 2.0–2.5 mm (0.079–0.098 in) long. Flowering occurs in September and October.

== Taxonomy ==
Pomaderris intermedia was first formally described in 1825 by Augustin Pyramus de Candolle in Prodromus Systematis Naturalis Regni Vegetabilis from an unpublished description by Franz Sieber. The specific epithet (intermedia) refers to a close association with two other Pomaderris species.

== Distribution and habitat ==
Lemon dogwood grows in forest, woodland and heath, and is found from south from the Gibraltar Range National Park in New South Wales to Western Port and French Island in Victoria, and in scattered locations in Tasmania, including on some Bass Strait islands.

== Conservation status ==
This pomaderris is listed as "rare" under the Tasmanian Government Threatened Species Protection Act 1995.
