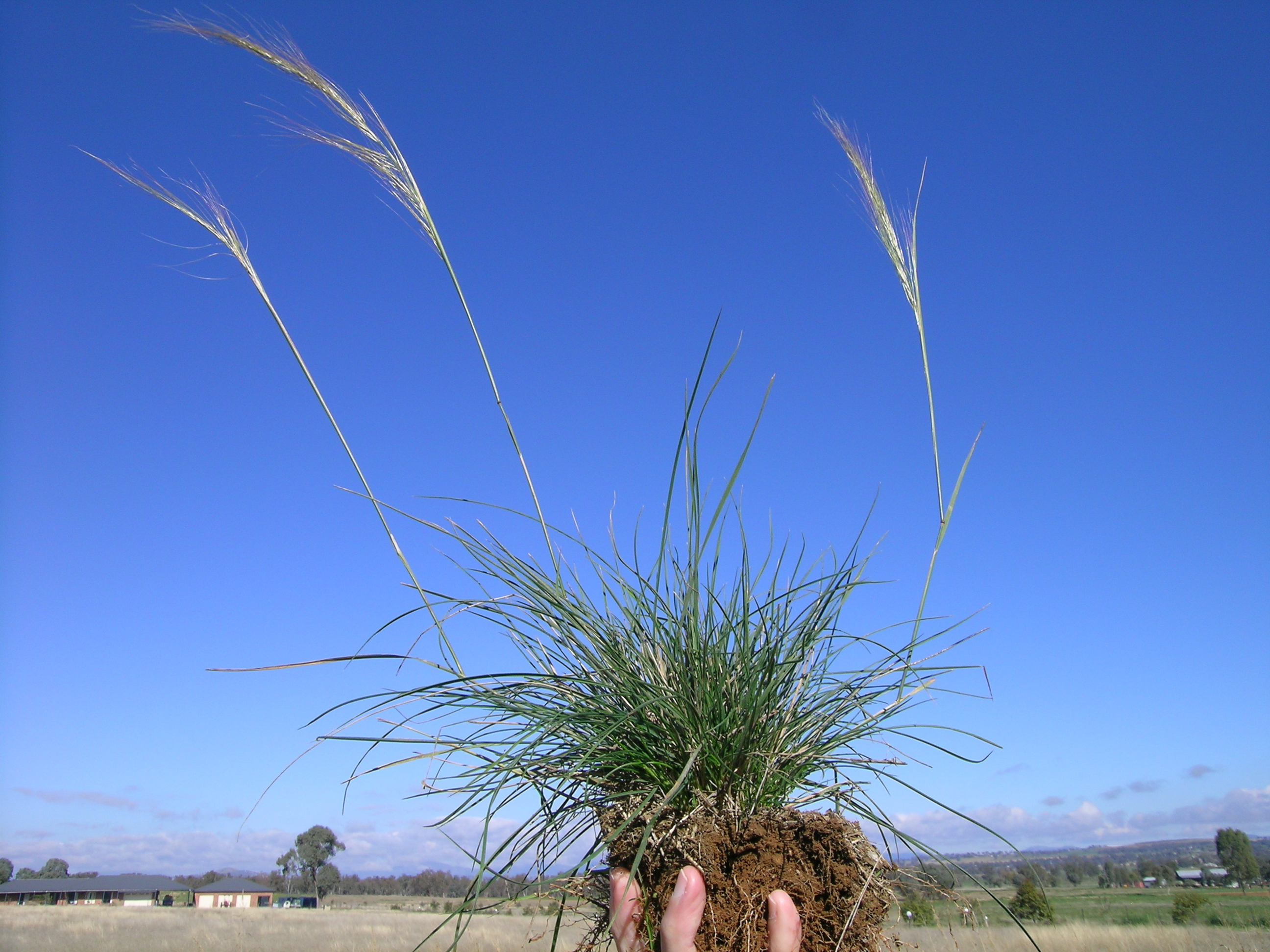

Scientific classification
- Kingdom: Plantae
- Clade: Tracheophytes
- Clade: Angiosperms
- Clade: Monocots
- Clade: Commelinids
- Order: Poales
- Family: Poaceae
- Subfamily: Pooideae
- Genus: Austrostipa
- Species: A. scabra

Binomial name
- Austrostipa scabra (Lindl.) S.W.L.Jacobs & J.Everett

Synonyms
- Stipa scabra Lindl.

= Austrostipa scabra =

speargrass

Species of grass

Austrostipa scabra (formerly stipa scabra) known as speargrass, is a widespread species of tussock grass found in southern and central Australia. Speargrass stems may reach 15 centimetres (5.9 in) tall, with stems up to 60 centimetres (2.0 ft) tall. There are two subspecies, scabra and falcata.
