= Folland Park =

Park in Enfield, South Australia

- Location within City of Port Adelaide Enfield
- Type: landmark
- Nearest city: Adelaide
- Coordinates: 34°51′33″S 138°36′21″E
- Operator: City of Port Adelaide Enfield
- Status: Closed to public

Folland Park is a fenced, 3.5-hectare reserve in the suburb of Enfield, South Australia. It is owned by the City of Port Adelaide Enfield, and consists of significant remnant vegetation that once covered much of the Adelaide Plains. The park is of special significance to botanists, and is under a heritage agreement to conserve its native vegetation and fauna.

== History ==
Folland Park is situated on the traditional lands of the Kaurna people of the Adelaide Plains.

During colonial times, the Enfield area was known as the Pine Forest due to its dense stands of Native Pine (Callitris gracilis). One of the first settlers of the district was Charles French Folland, who purchased about 30 hectares of the Pine Forest in 1848. The land remained with the Folland family until 1944, when it was sold to the Church of England to establish a cemetery on the site.

In 1946, the whole of the land not required for cemetery purposes was sold to the South Australian Housing Trust. The City of Enfield Council subsequently negotiated with the Trust to obtain eight hectares of land for a public park. 62 species of indigenous flora were identified on this land, which was believed to be almost every species in the district. In 1955, a kindergarten was built on the northern boundary. Over time, cattle grazing, vandalism and weed infestation took a toll on the biodiversity in Folland Park, and by 1983 only 20 indigenous plant species remained. In an effort to conserve the remaining flora, council fenced the park and restricted public access.

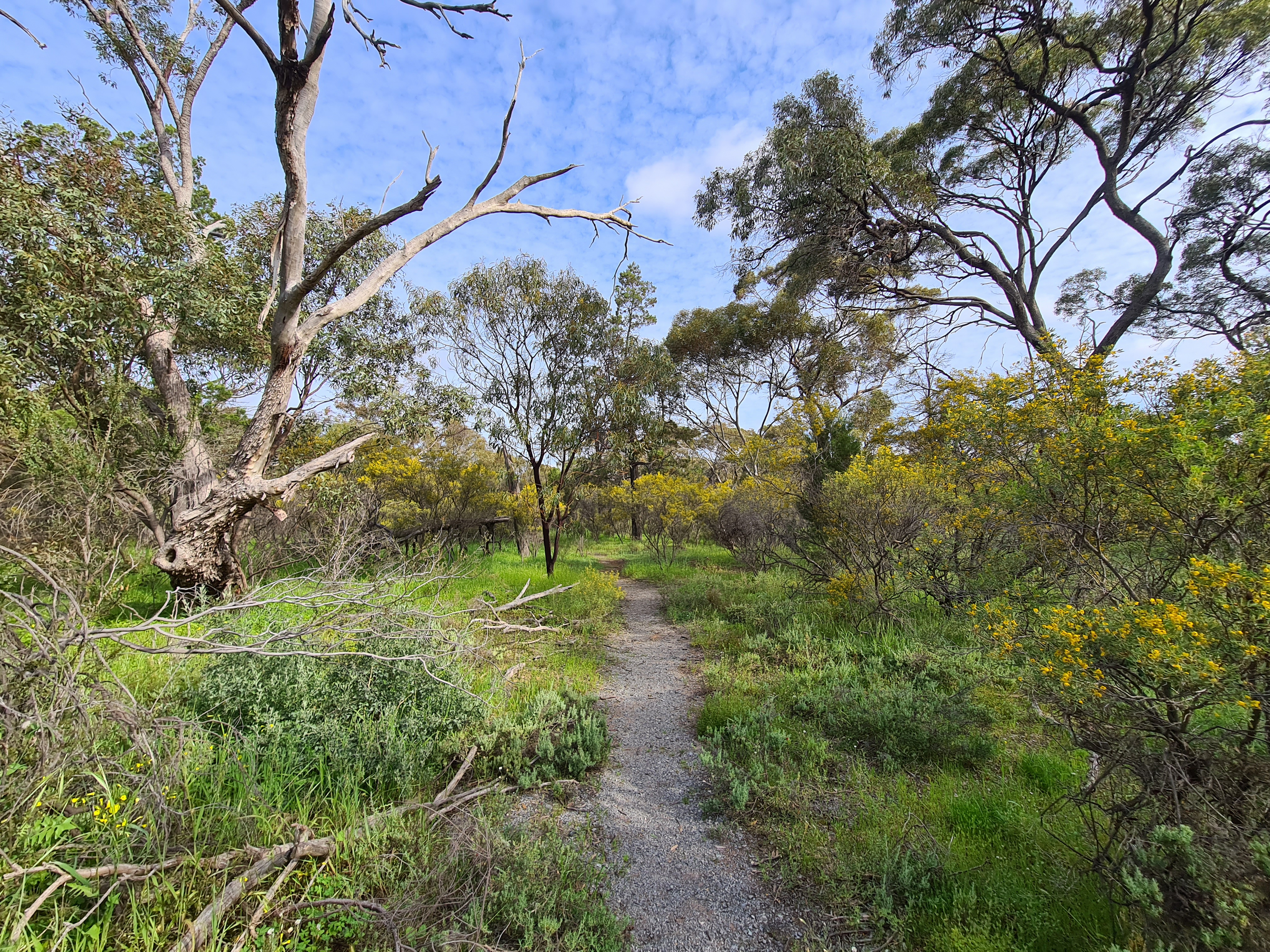
Remnant vegetation in Folland Park in spring.

In September 1989, a Native Heritage Agreement was registered over the land for the purposes of conservation of native vegetation and native fauna (under the South Australian Heritage Act 1978-1980).

In the early to mid-1990s, a buffer zone was planted in the adjacent Enfield cemetery using plants propagated from Folland Park seed. This buffer zone is now being used as South Australia's first natural burial ground, where people can be laid to rest amongst native vegetation.

In 1995, Trees for Life formed a partnership with the Enfield Council, and volunteers began conducting bushcare work in Folland Park which continues to this day. Using minimal disturbance techniques, the team of dedicated volunteers gradually made a big improvement to the park, eliminating weeds from some areas and allowing indigenous plants to regenerate from the seed-bank.

The original action plan for Folland Park was produced in 1997 to guide ongoing management of the park, with an updated version produced in August 2022. The park remains closed to the general public, however, guided nature walks are occasionally facilitated by the council.

== Flora ==
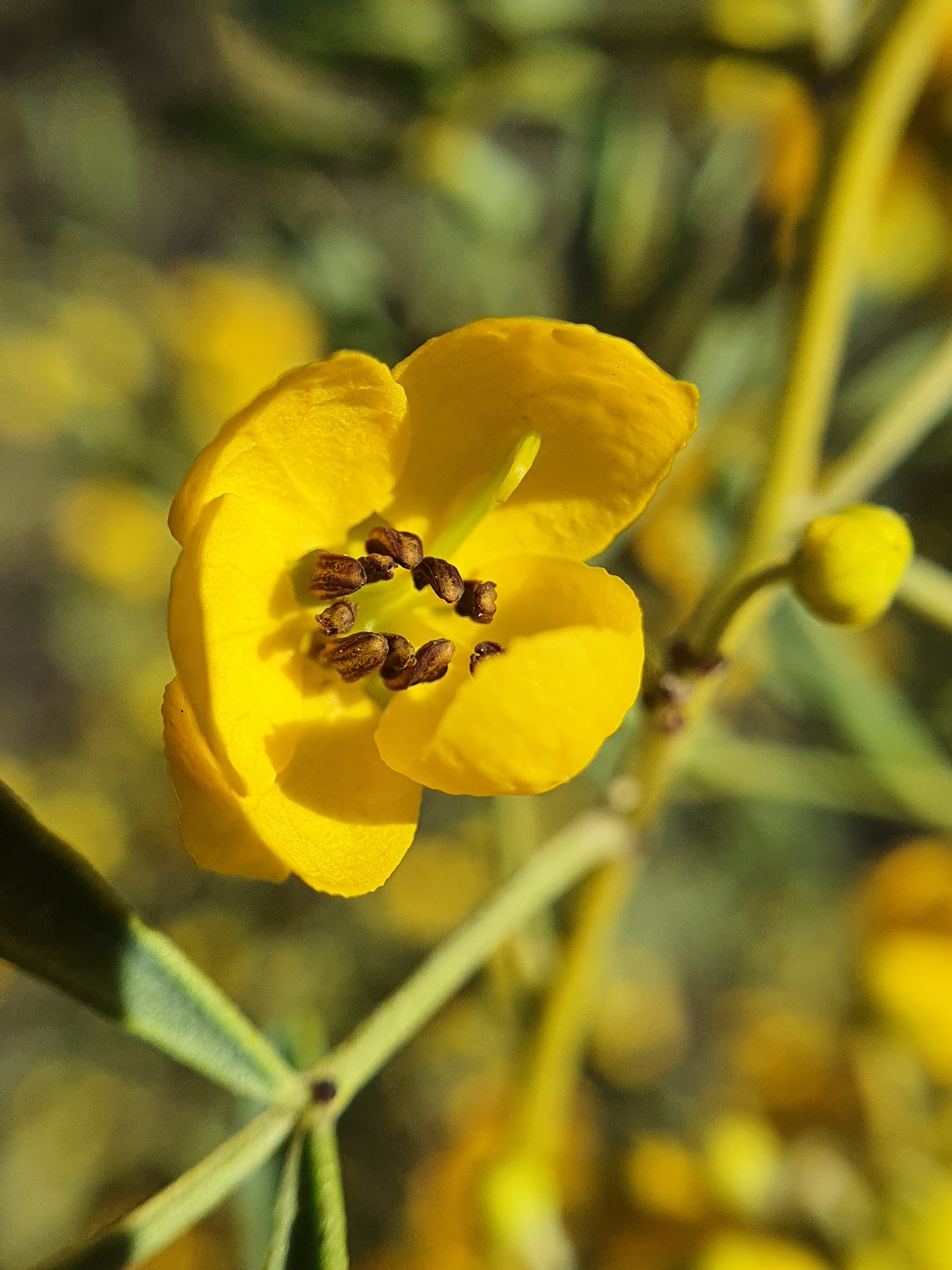
Senna artemisioides flower.

The vegetation assemblage in Folland Park is one of the few remaining examples of the mallee woodland that once covered much of the Adelaide Plains. The tallest canopy plants are Eucalyptus porosa, E. socialis and E. dumosa. The under-storey is dominated by Senna artemisioides and various Acacias. The ground layer includes chenopods, grasses and daisies. The Native Pine can still be found in the park, though it is not as numerous as it once was.

The site is a bastion for a number of threatened flora species. For example, Comesperma volubile is listed as rare at a regional level. Acacia notabilis is endangered at a regional level. Crassula sieberiana is endangered at state level, and the native grasses Rytidosperma tenuius and Austrostipa multispiculis are both listed as rare at regional and state levels.

Woody weeds are largely under control, with little effort required to remove new seedlings as they emerge. Olive, African boxthorn and bridal creeper (all declared weeds under the Landscape South Australia Act 2019) have been virtually eliminated from the park.

== Fauna ==
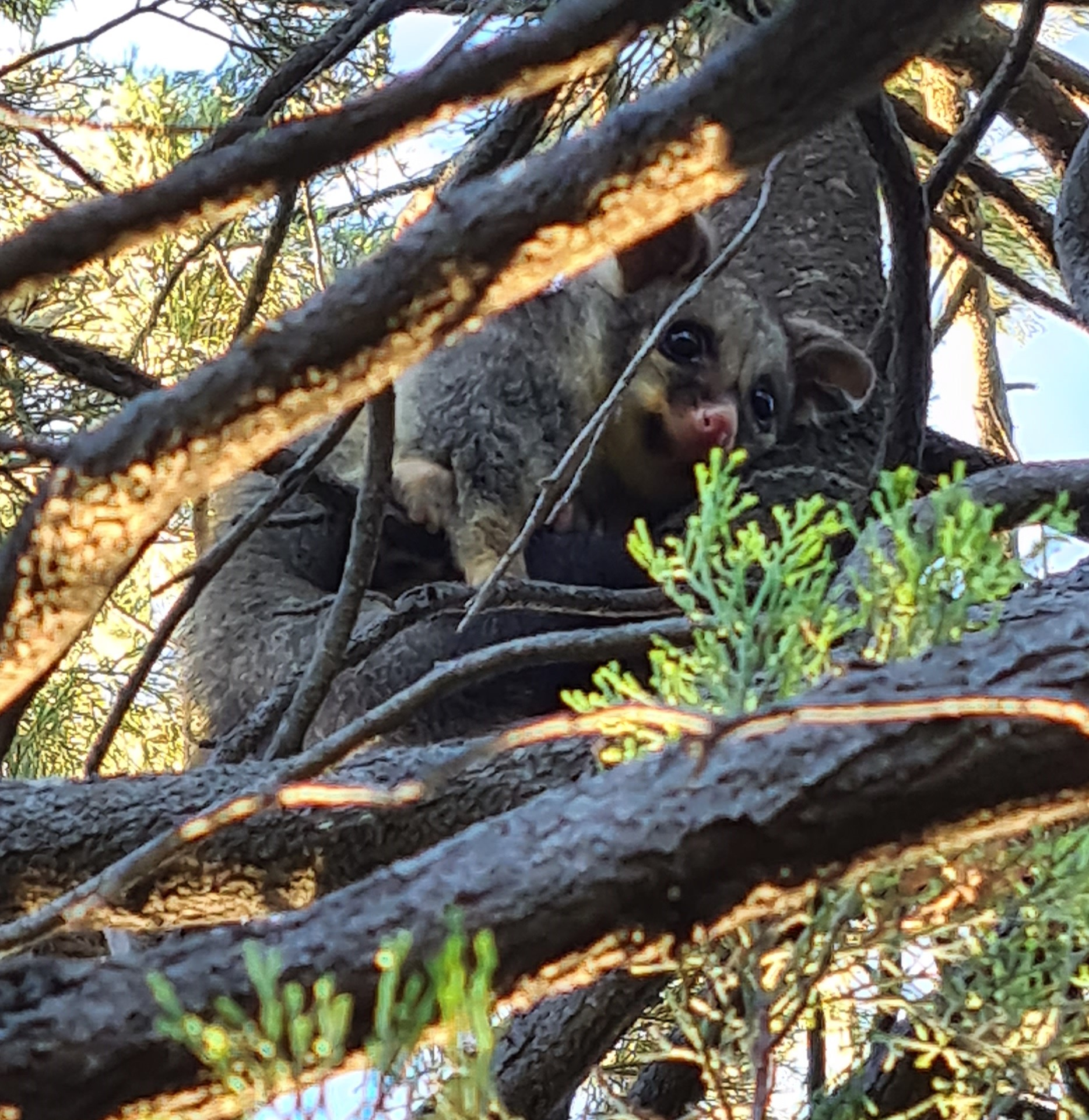
Brushtail Possum in Native Pine in Folland Park.

Prior to European settlement, the Enfield area was likely home to echidnas, bandicoots and kangaroos, but they have long since disappeared under the pressures of urban development. However, some native mammals still survive in Folland Park, including the Gould's Wattled Bat, White-striped Free-tailed Bat, Southern Freetail Bat, Lesser Long-eared Bat and the Brushtail Possum (which is listed as rare at regional and state levels). There is a significant fox population in and around the park, which has had an enormous impact on the native fauna. Feral European honeybees are also a constant threat, as they compete with birds, possums and bats for nesting hollows in the old mallee trees. Wandering cats are another likely threat to the native wildlife.

Citizen scientists have recorded 21 native bird species in the park. This includes the Willie Wagtail, Purple-crowned Lorikeet and Spotted Pardalote, all of which are listed as “near threatened” at a regional level. Sleepy lizards and Saltbush Skinks have also been recorded. The park is a refuge for the Small Grass Yellow Butterfly, which lays eggs on Senna artemisioides. The Waroona cuckoo bee can be seen in the warmer months. There are historical records of cockatiels and common bronzewings, but no recent sightings.
