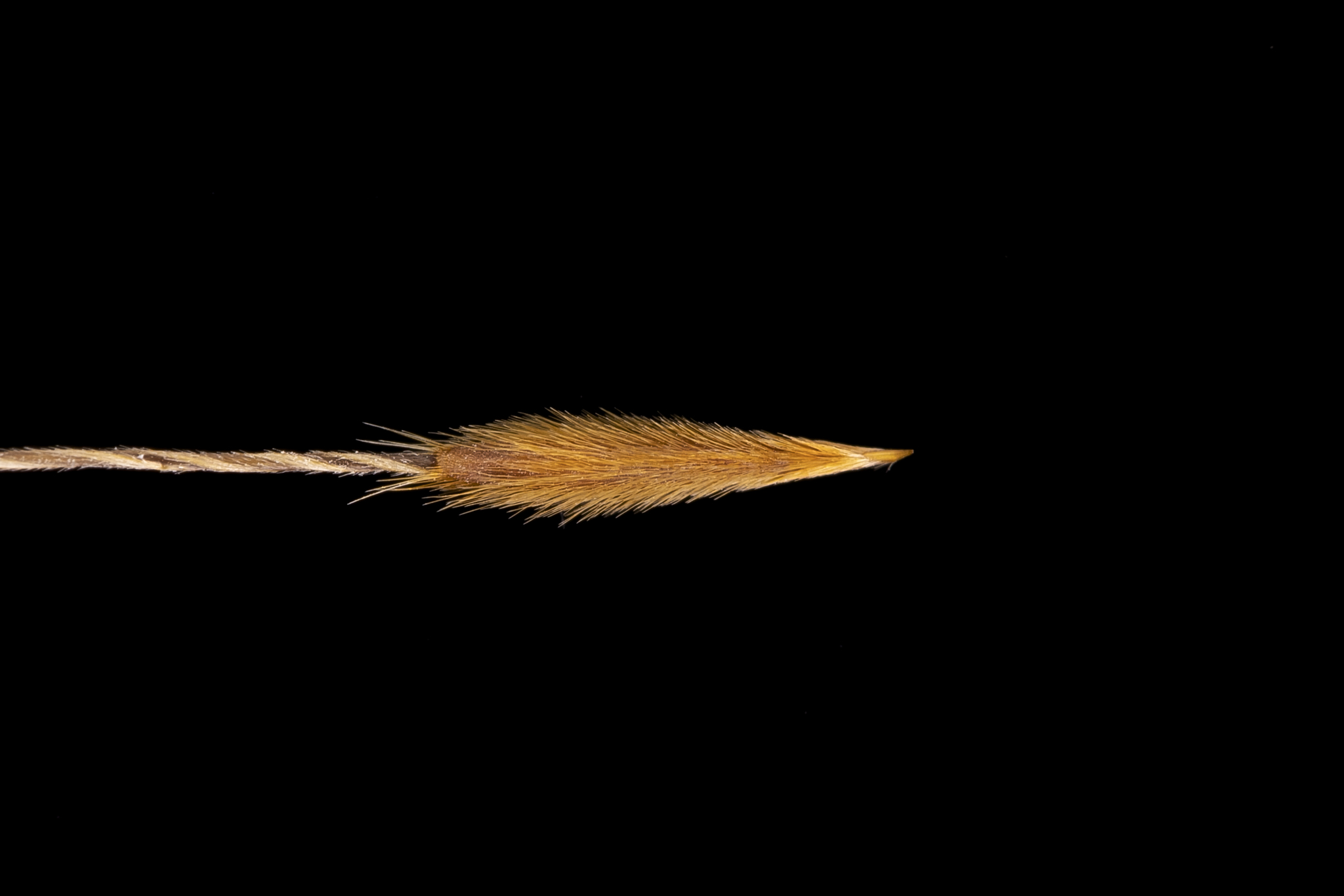

Scientific classification
- Kingdom: Plantae
- Clade: Tracheophytes
- Clade: Angiosperms
- Clade: Monocots
- Clade: Commelinids
- Order: Poales
- Family: Poaceae
- Subfamily: Pooideae
- Genus: Austrostipa
- Species: A. puberula

Binomial name
- Austrostipa puberula S.W.L.Jacobs & J.Everett (Steud.)

= Austrostipa puberula =

Species of flowering plant

Austrostipa puberula is a plant species from the genus Austrostipa. This species was originally described by Surrey Wilfrid Laurance Jacobs and Joy Everett.

== Sources ==
- Proceedings of the Linnean Society of New South Wales. Vol. v.134 (2012). Linnean Society of New South Wales. 2012. p. Page B161.
- Telopea: Journal of plant systematics. Vol. v.6:no.4 (1996:March). Royal Botanic Garden Sydney. 1996. p. 588.

Media related to Austrostipa puberula at Wikimedia Commons
