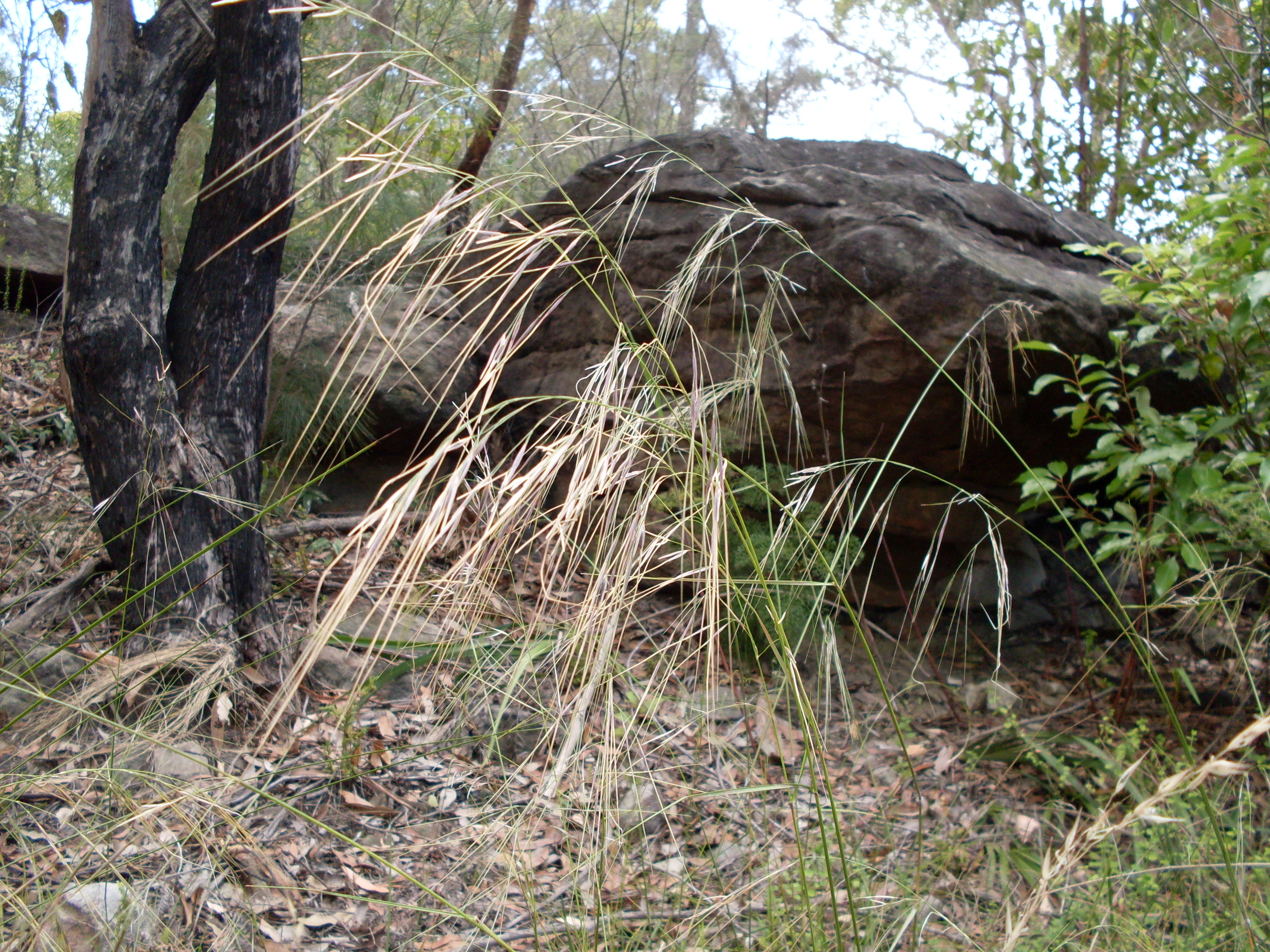
- Jannali, Australia

Scientific classification
- Kingdom: Plantae
- Clade: Tracheophytes
- Clade: Angiosperms
- Clade: Monocots
- Clade: Commelinids
- Order: Poales
- Family: Poaceae
- Subfamily: Pooideae
- Genus: Austrostipa
- Species: A. pubescens

Binomial name
- Austrostipa pubescens (R.Br.) S.W.L.Jacobs & J.Everett

Synonyms
- * Stipa pubescens R.Br.

= Austrostipa pubescens =

Species of grass

Austrostipa pubescens, the spear grass, grows in heathland and sandy areas in eastern Australia.

It grows in the form of a tufted bunchgrass, and may reach a height of 1.5 metres (4.9 ft). The specific epithet pubescens translates to "softly hairy".

It first appeared in scientific literature in 1810 as Stipa pubescens in the Prodromus Florae Novae Hollandiae, authored by the prolific Scottish botanist, Robert Brown.
