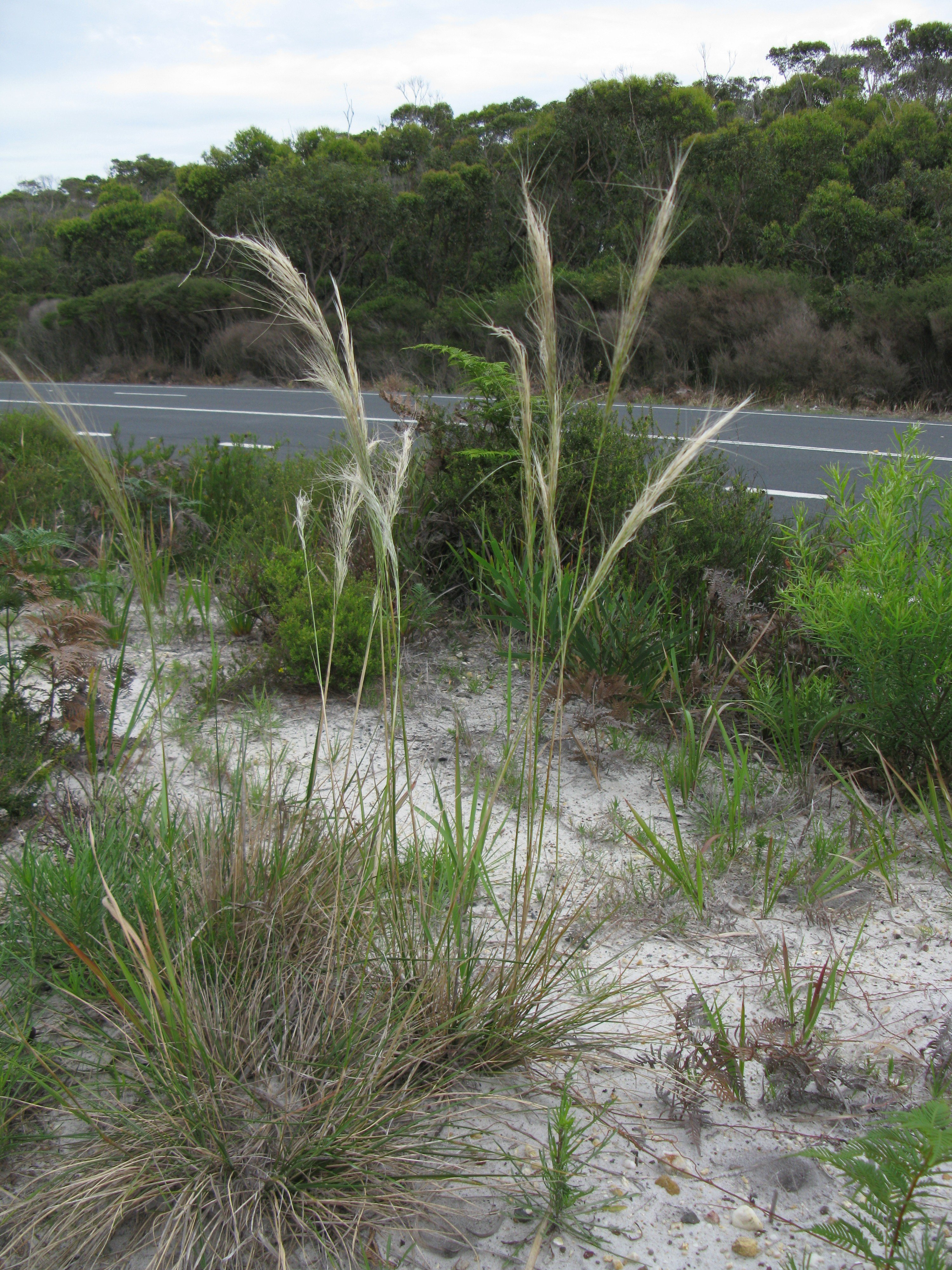

Scientific classification
- Kingdom: Plantae
- Clade: Embryophytes
- Clade: Tracheophytes
- Clade: Angiosperms
- Clade: Monocots
- Clade: Commelinids
- Order: Poales
- Family: Poaceae
- Subfamily: Pooideae
- Genus: Austrostipa
- Species: A. mollis

Binomial name
- Austrostipa mollis (R.Br.) S.W.L.Jacobs & J.Everett

= Austrostipa mollis =

Species of grass

Austrostipa mollis, also known as the soft speargrass or supple speargrass, is a robust, erect tufted perennial speargrass in the Poaceae family. It is native to Australia, and found in Western Australia, South Australia, Victoria, ACT and Tasmania.

It was first described as Stipa mollis by Robert Brown in 1810 from a specimen collected in Tasmania. In 1996 was transferred to the genus Austrostipa.

== Description ==
A perennial erect, robust and tufted grass to 1.4 m tall. Stem nodes have downy hairs. Leaves are tufted at the base of the plant, usually glabrous, and densely hairy above reaching 30-50% of the stem length. Inflorescence up to 30 cm long in a dense panicle. Glumes purplish or green, 16–22 mm long. Lemma 7.5–9 mm long, pale or reddish brown at maturity. Hairs are semi-appressed, 0.6–2 mm long, that spiral and appear white to golden except toward apex. Palea about equal to lemma, with a line of hairs down the centre. Flowers September to December.

== Habitat ==
The plant grows in moist to dry soils, particularly in heathy woodlands. It is frost and snow tolerant and grows in full sun to semi shade. Can be propagated by seed sown in autumn to early winter. Occurs in a wide range of habitats with sandy and/or low fertility soils (e.g. coastal dunes and headlands, slightly saline flats, shrubland and dry eucalypt forest).

== Gallery ==
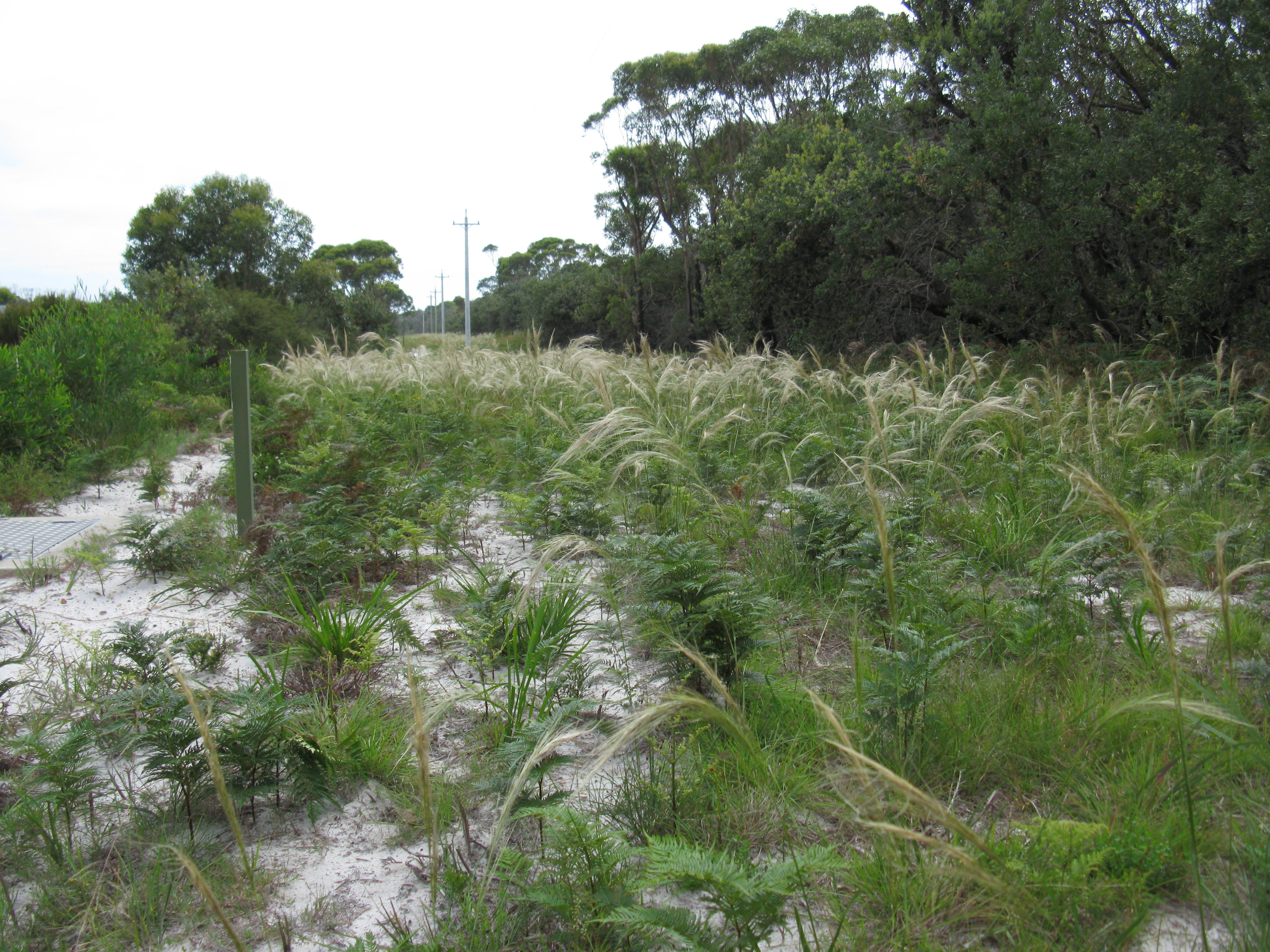
Habit of Austrostipa mollis

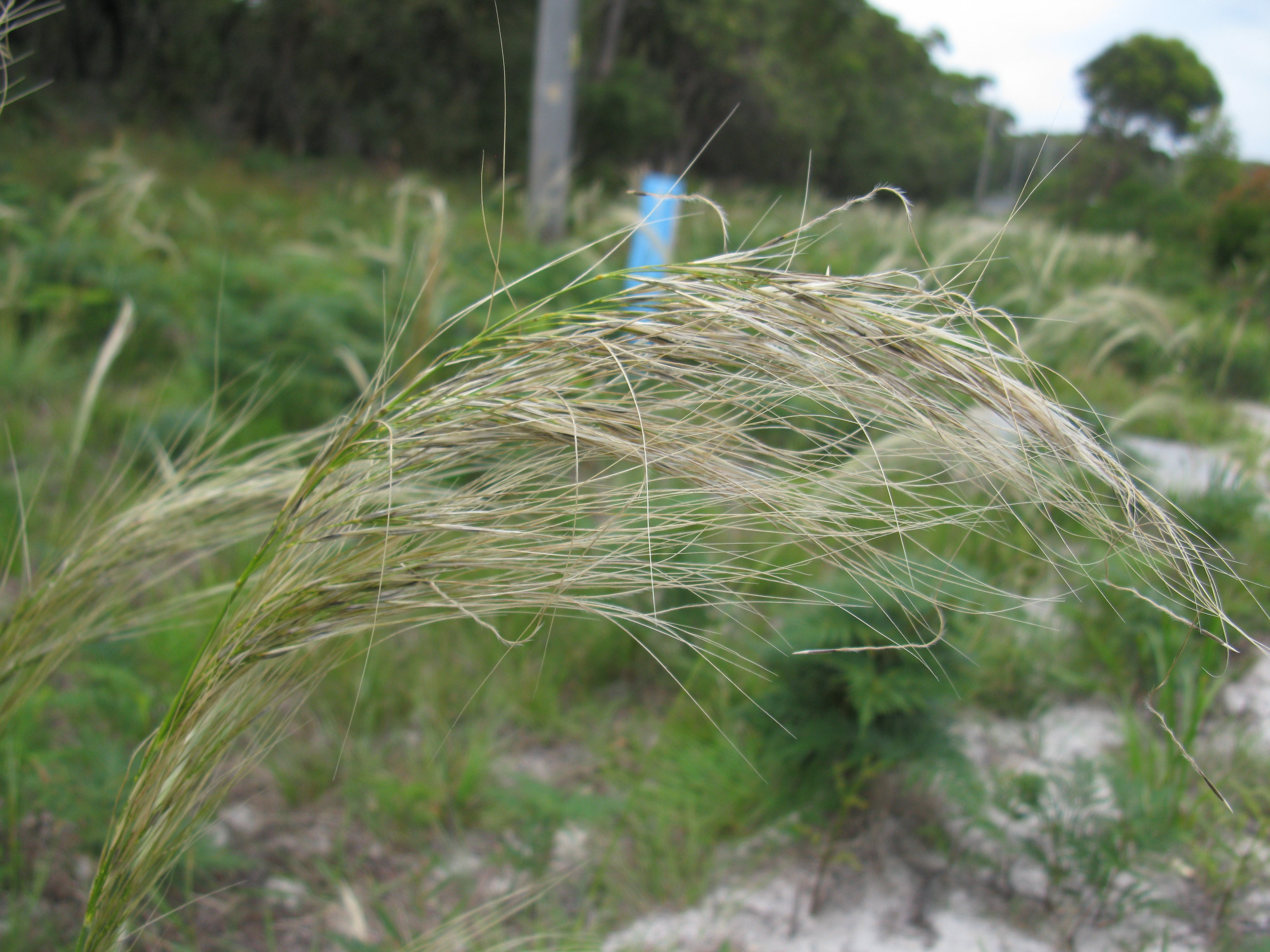
Inflorescence of Austrostipa mollis

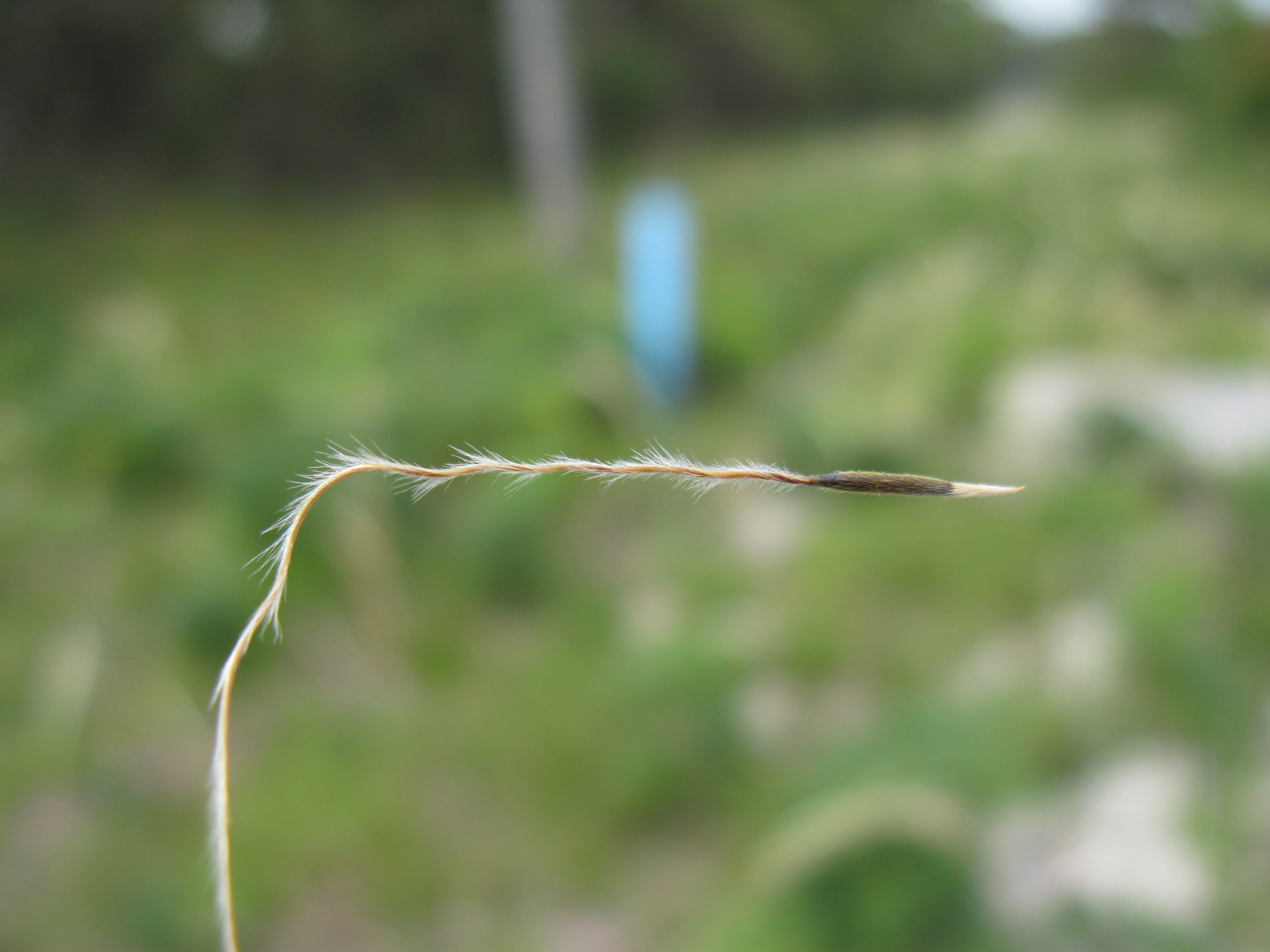
Austrostipa mollis seed
