= Austrostipa multispiculis =

Scientific classification
- Kingdom: Plantae
- Clade: Tracheophytes
- Clade: Angiosperms
- Clade: Monocots
- Clade: Commelinids
- Order: Poales
- Family: Poaceae
- Subfamily: Pooideae
- Genus: Austrostipa
- Species: A. multispiculis

Binomial name
- Austrostipa multispiculis (J.M.Black) S.W.L.Jacobs & J.Everett

Synonyms
- Stipa multispiculis J.M.Black

Species of plant

Austrostipa multispiculis, commonly known as small-seed spear grass, is a species of perennial grass in the family Poaceae. It is endemic to South Australia, with records from the Northern Lofty, Southern Lofty, Kangaroo Island and Murray regions. It flowers mainly from October to November. It most often occurs in Eucalyptus woodland, but also along creeklines and in grassland. It is listed as rare under the National Parks and Wildlife Act 1972. It is a C3 (winter growing) grass, and mammals are the primary seed disperser. It grows up to a height of 1 metre.

The species was first described by John McConnell Black as Stipa multispiculis in 1941, and assigned to the genus Austrostipa in 1996.
