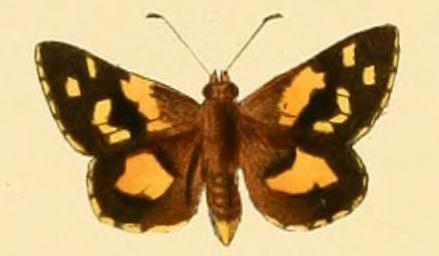
- Croitana croites

Scientific classification
- Kingdom: Animalia
- Phylum: Arthropoda
- Class: Insecta
- Order: Lepidoptera
- Family: Hesperiidae
- Subfamily: Trapezitinae
- Genus: Croitana; Waterhouse, 1932

= Croitana =

Genus of butterflies

Croitana is a genus of skipper butterflies in the family Hesperiidae.

== Species ==
- Croitana aestiva E.D. Edwards, 1979
- Croitana arenaria E.D. Edwards, 1979
- Croitana croites Hewitson, 1874
