= Croitana aestiva =

Scientific classification
- Kingdom: Animalia
- Phylum: Arthropoda
- Class: Insecta
- Order: Lepidoptera
- Family: Hesperiidae
- Genus: Croitana
- Species: C. aestiva

Binomial name
- Croitana aestiva E.D. Edwards, 1979

Species of butterfly

Croitana aestiva, the desert sand-skipper, is a butterfly of the family Hesperiidae. It is endemic to the Northern Territory, Australia.

The wingspan is about 20 mm.
