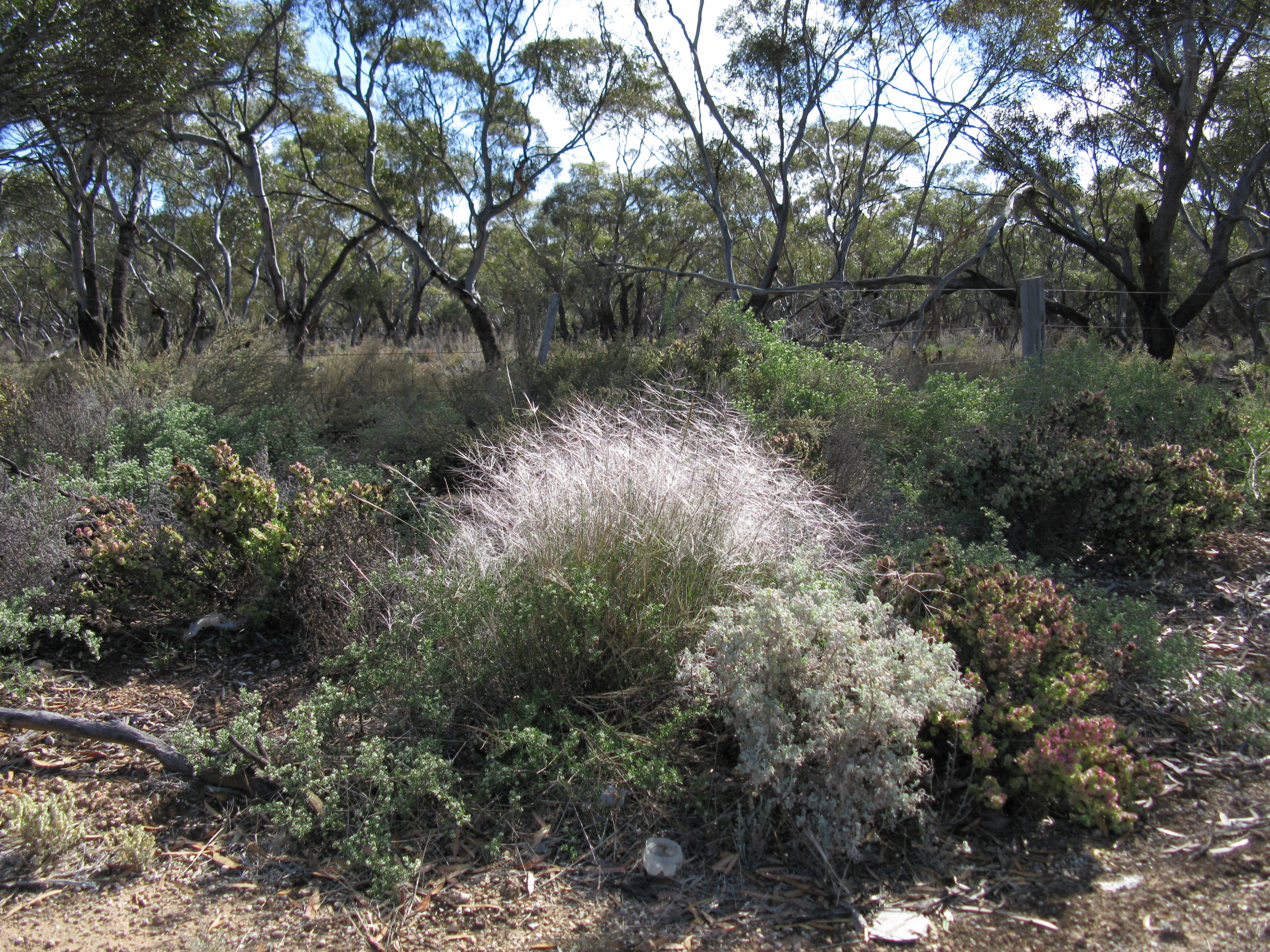

Scientific classification
- Kingdom: Plantae
- Clade: Tracheophytes
- Clade: Angiosperms
- Clade: Monocots
- Clade: Commelinids
- Order: Poales
- Family: Poaceae
- Subfamily: Pooideae
- Genus: Austrostipa
- Species: A. elegantissima

Binomial name
- Austrostipa elegantissima (Labill.) S.W.L.Jacobs & J.Everett

Synonyms
- Stipa elegantissima Labill.

= Austrostipa elegantissima =

Species of plant

Austrostipa elegantissima, commonly known as tall feather-grass, is a species of grass in the family Poaceae. It is native to southern Australia, from Western Australia to New South Wales. It grows as a decumbent perennial in a rhizomatous tussock with widespread leaves, and lacks basal leaves. It is found in areas that are not grazed by introduced livestock, which feed on this plant.

The species was first described by Jacques Labillardière as Stipa elegantissima in 1805 and assigned to the genus Austrostipa in 1996. The plant is used by red-eared firetail (Stagonopleura oculata) in the construction of its nests.
