= Austrostipa flavescens =

Scientific classification
- Kingdom: Plantae
- Clade: Tracheophytes
- Clade: Angiosperms
- Clade: Monocots
- Clade: Commelinids
- Order: Poales
- Family: Poaceae
- Subfamily: Pooideae
- Genus: Austrostipa
- Species: A. flavescens

Binomial name
- Austrostipa flavescens (Labill.) S.W.L.Jacobs & J.Everett

Synonyms
- Stipa flavescens Labill.; Stipa hirsuta Hughes; Stipa scabra var. elatior Benth.

Species of plant

Austrostipa flavescens, commonly known as coast spear-grass, is a species of grass in the genus Austrostipa, family Poaceae. It is native to southern Australia. It grows as a perennial tussock grass, with flat to narrow inrolled leaves, up to about 1.2 m in height. It is found on sandy, sandy loam and limestone soils as well as on dunes.
