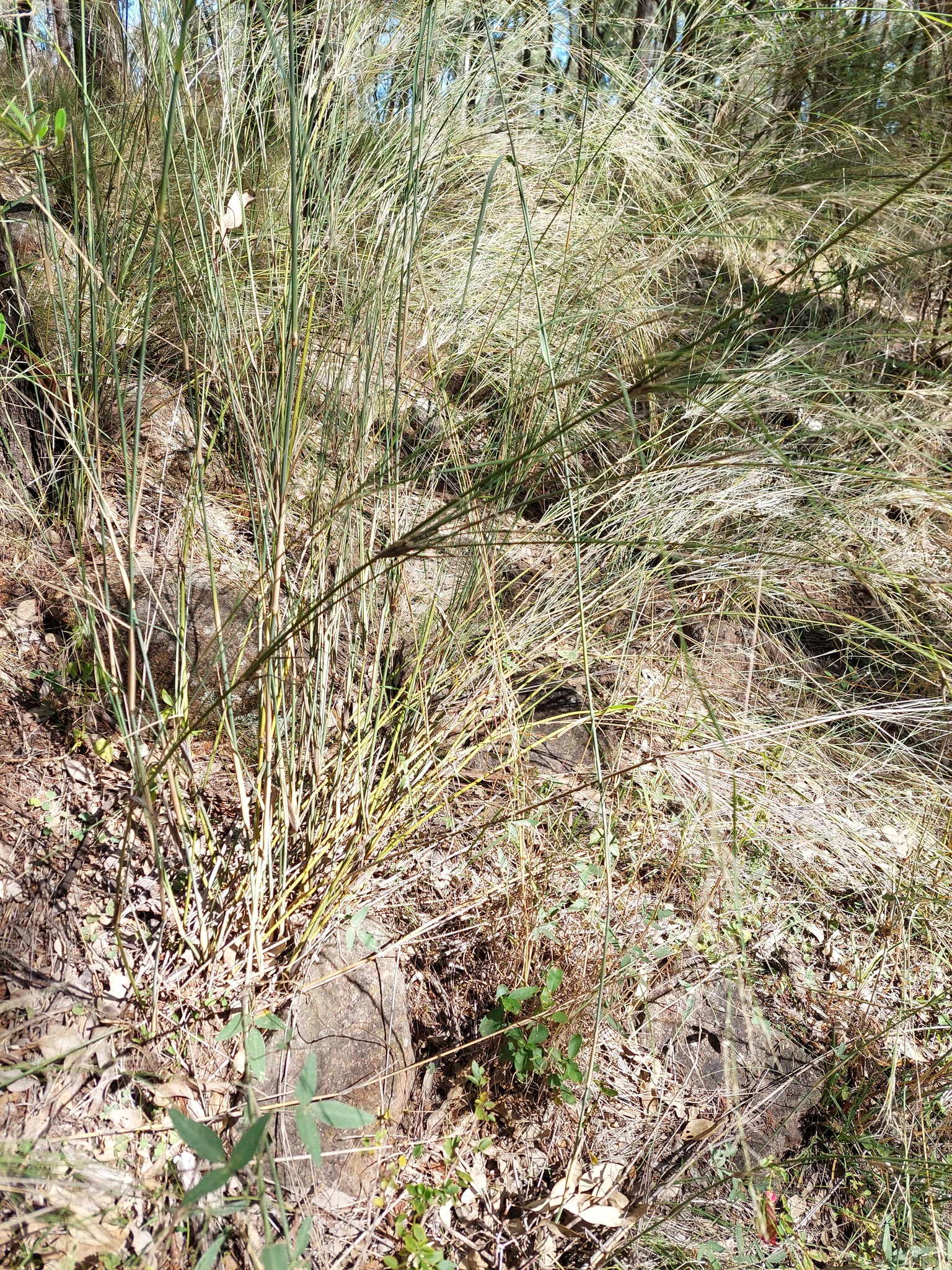
- Maules Creek, NSW (2024-05-02)

Scientific classification
- Kingdom: Plantae
- Clade: Tracheophytes
- Clade: Angiosperms
- Clade: Monocots
- Clade: Commelinids
- Order: Poales
- Family: Poaceae
- Genus: Aristida
- Species: A. lignosa

Binomial name
- Aristida lignosa B.K.Simon

= Aristida lignosa =

Species of grass

Aristida lignosa is a species of Poaceae (grass), native to New South Wales and Queensland, in Australia.

It was first described in 1984 by Bryan Kenneth Simon.

== Distribution & habitat ==
Its range extends from central and south-eastern Queensland to northern New South Wales, where it is found in Acacia communities in rocky places.
