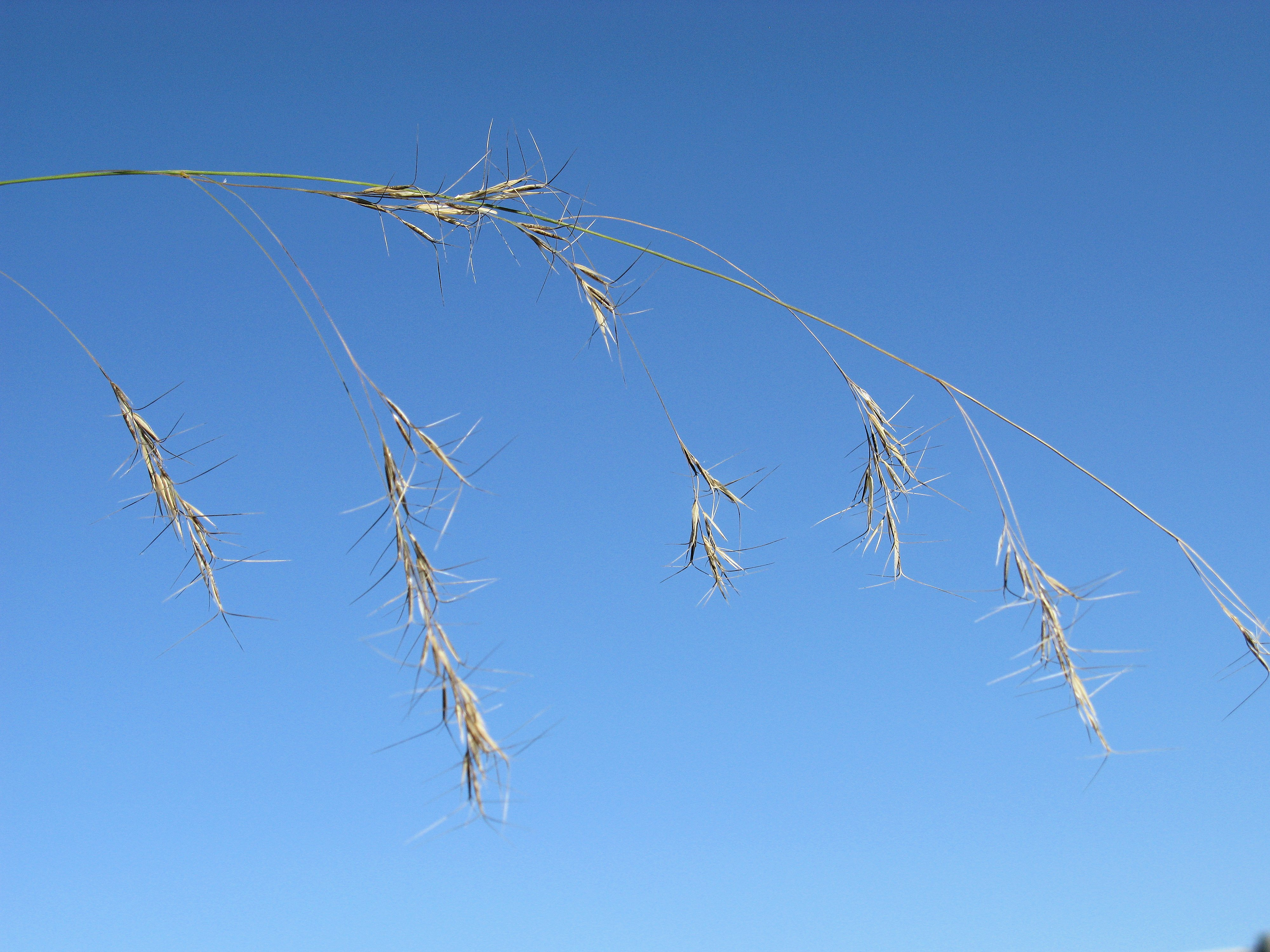

Scientific classification
- Kingdom: Plantae
- Clade: Tracheophytes
- Clade: Angiosperms
- Clade: Monocots
- Clade: Commelinids
- Order: Poales
- Family: Poaceae
- Genus: Aristida
- Species: A. benthamii

Binomial name
- Aristida benthamii Henrard

= Aristida benthamii =

Species of plant

Aristida benthamii is a native Australian species of grass. Found in New South Wales and Queensland.
