= Croitana arenaria =

Scientific classification
- Kingdom: Animalia
- Phylum: Arthropoda
- Class: Insecta
- Order: Lepidoptera
- Family: Hesperiidae
- Genus: Croitana
- Species: C. arenaria

Binomial name
- Croitana arenaria E.D. Edwards, 1979

Species of butterfly

Croitana arenaria, the inland sand-skipper, is a butterfly of the family Hesperiidae. It is endemic to Australia in the Northern Territory and South Australia.

The wingspan is about 20 mm.
