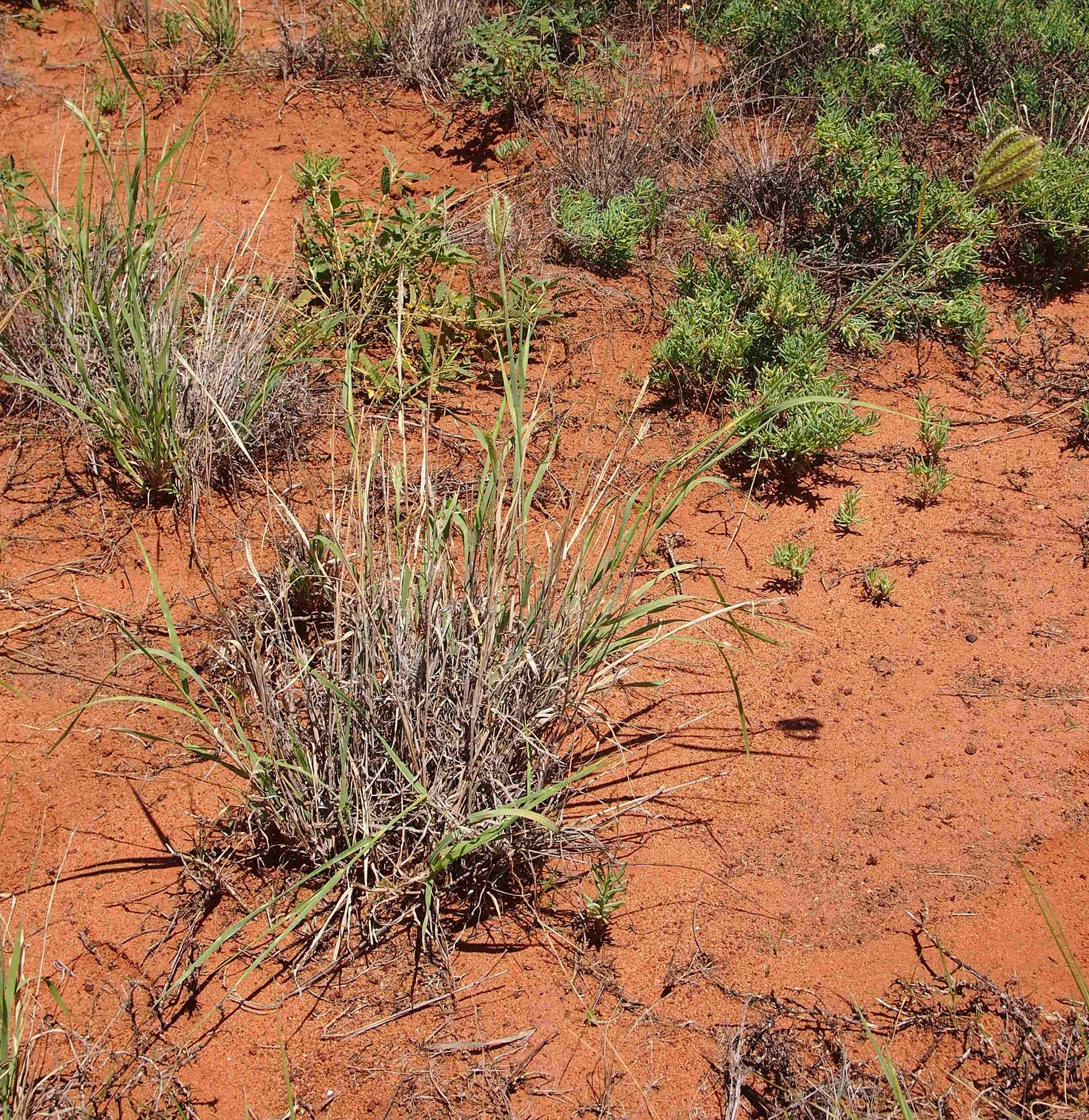

Scientific classification
- Kingdom: Plantae
- Clade: Tracheophytes
- Clade: Angiosperms
- Clade: Monocots
- Clade: Commelinids
- Order: Poales
- Family: Poaceae
- Subfamily: Chloridoideae
- Tribe: Cynodonteae
- Subtribe: Eleusininae
- Genus: Oxychloris; Lazarides
- Species: O. scariosa

Binomial name
- Oxychloris scariosa (F.Muell.) Lazarides

Synonyms
- Chloris scariosa F.Muell.

= Oxychloris =

Genus of grasses

Oxychloris is a genus of Australian plants in the grass family. The only known species is Oxychloris scariosa.
