= Surrey Wilfrid Laurance Jacobs =

Australian botanist (1946–2009)

Surrey Wilfrid Laurance Jacobs (born on April 29, 1946 in Sydney and died on November 26, 2009) was an Australian botanist.

== Selected publications ==
- Joyce Vickery; Surrey Jacobs; Joy Everett (27 August 1986). "Taxonomic studies in Stipa (Poaceae) in Australia". Telopea. 3 (1): 1–132. doi:10.7751/TELOPEA19864701. ISSN 0312-9764. Wikidata Q55800117.
- S. W. L. Jacobs; J. Everett; M. E. Barkworth (February 1995). "Clarification of Morphological Terms Used in the Stipeae (Gramineae), and a Reassessment of Nassella in Australia". Taxon. 44 (1): 33–41. doi:10.2307/1222675. ISSN 0040-0262. JSTOR 1222675. Wikidata Q28957910.
- Surrey Jacobs; Joy Everett (1 July 1996). "Austrostipa, a new genus, and new names for the Australasian species formerly included in Stipa (Gramineae)". Telopea. 6 (4): 579–595. doi:10.7751/TELOPEA19963026. ISSN 0312-9764. Wikidata Q55801393.
- W. D. Clayton; Surrey W. L. Jacobs; Joy Everett (2002). "Grasses. Systematic and Evolution". Kew Bulletin. 57 (2): 470. doi:10.2307/4111128. ISSN 0075-5974. JSTOR 4111128. Wikidata Q93620684.
