= Joy Everett =

Australian botanist (born 1953)

- Born: 1953 (age 72–73)
- Scientific career
- Fields: Botany
- Author abbrev. (botany): J.Everett

Joy Everett (born 1953) is an Australian botanist. During her 28-year career at the National Herbarium in Sydney, she described 121 genera, species and subspecies. Her research focused on Asteraceae and Poaceae and she has collected 2,285 specimens across Australia, but none in the Northern Territory.

In 1990 Everett graduated from the University of Sydney with a MSc for her thesis, Systematic relationships of the Australian stipeae (Poaceae). Everett was an active member with the National Herbarium of New South Wales from 1980 to her retirement in December 2008.

== Selected publications ==
- Joyce Vickery; Surrey Jacobs; Joy Everett (27 August 1986). "Taxonomic studies in Stipa (Poaceae) in Australia". Telopea. 3 (1): 1–132. doi:10.7751/TELOPEA19864701. ISSN 0312-9764. Wikidata Q55800117.
- S. W. L. Jacobs; J. Everett; M. E. Barkworth (February 1995). "Clarification of Morphological Terms Used in the Stipeae (Gramineae), and a Reassessment of Nassella in Australia". Taxon. 44 (1): 33–41. doi:10.2307/1222675. ISSN 0040-0262. JSTOR 1222675. Wikidata Q28957910.
- Surrey Jacobs; Joy Everett (1 July 1996). "Austrostipa, a new genus, and new names for the Australasian species formerly included in Stipa (Gramineae)". Telopea. 6 (4): 579–595. doi:10.7751/TELOPEA19963026. ISSN 0312-9764. Wikidata Q55801393.
- W. D. Clayton; Surrey W. L. Jacobs; Joy Everett (2002). "Grasses. Systematic and Evolution". Kew Bulletin. 57 (2): 470. doi:10.2307/4111128. ISSN 0075-5974. JSTOR 4111128. Wikidata Q93620684.
