= Bowgada =

Bowgada may refer to:

- Bowgada, Western Australia, a small town
- Bowgada wattle, common name for Acacia ramulosa, a shrub
  - Acacia ramulosa var. linophylla, a spreading shrub or low tree
