= Mulga =

Mulga may refer to:

== Flora ==
- Acacia aneura (mulga or true mulga, a shrub or tree native to Australia)
  - Mulga apple, its edible gall
- Any of many similar Acacia species, such as:
  - Acacia brachystachya (umbrella mulga)
  - Acacia citrinoviridis (black mulga)
  - Acacia craspedocarpa (hop mulga)
  - Acacia cyperophylla (red mulga)

== Fauna ==
- Mulga parrot, bird of southern Australia
- Pseudechis australis, also known as the mulga snake
- Pseudechis weigeli, also known as the pygmy mulga snake
- Pygmy mulga monitor, monitor lizard native to Australia
- Mulga dragon, lizard native to Australia

== Places ==
=== Australia ===
- Alternative term for the Bush or wilderness regions; for example, "up the mulga"
- Mulga (habitat), an Australian woodland or open forest habitat dominated by trees of the species Acacia
- Mulga Lands, an Interim Biogeographic Regionalisation for Australia region of Australia
- Mulga Creek, a river of New South Wales, Australia
- Mulga Queen Community, a community Western Australia, Australia
- Western Australian mulga shrublands ecoregion
- Former name of Brigalow, Queensland, Australia

=== Elsewhere ===
- Mulga, Alabama, a town in the United States
- Mulga, Ohio, a community in the United States
- Mulga Island, an island in Antarctica

== People ==
- George "Mulga" Taylor (1861–1935), Australian labour leader and MP

== See also ==
- "Mulga Bill's Bicycle", a poem written in 1896 by Banjo Paterson
