= Granite wattle =

Granite wattle is a common name for several plants and may refer to:

- Acacia kempeana, commonly known as "Wanderrie wattle", "witchetty bush" or "granite wattle";
- Acacia quadrimarginea, commonly known as "granite wattle" or "spreading wattle".
- Acacia tarculensis, commonly known as "granite wattle", "granite bush" or "steel bush".
