= Spreading wattle =

Spreading wattle is a common name for several plants and may refer to:

- Acacia genistifolia, native to southeastern Australia
- Acacia quadrimarginea
