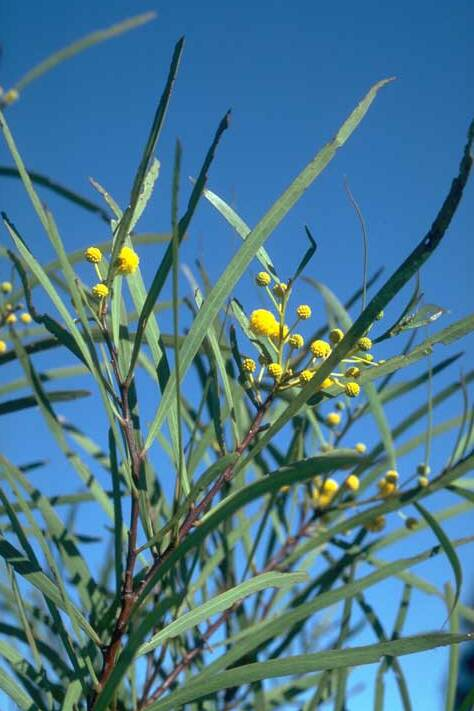

Conservation status
- Least Concern (IUCN 3.1)

Scientific classification
- Kingdom: Plantae
- Clade: Tracheophytes
- Clade: Angiosperms
- Clade: Eudicots
- Clade: Rosids
- Order: Fabales
- Family: Fabaceae
- Subfamily: Caesalpinioideae
- Clade: Mimosoid clade
- Genus: Acacia
- Species: A. ensifolia

Binomial name
- Acacia ensifolia Pedley
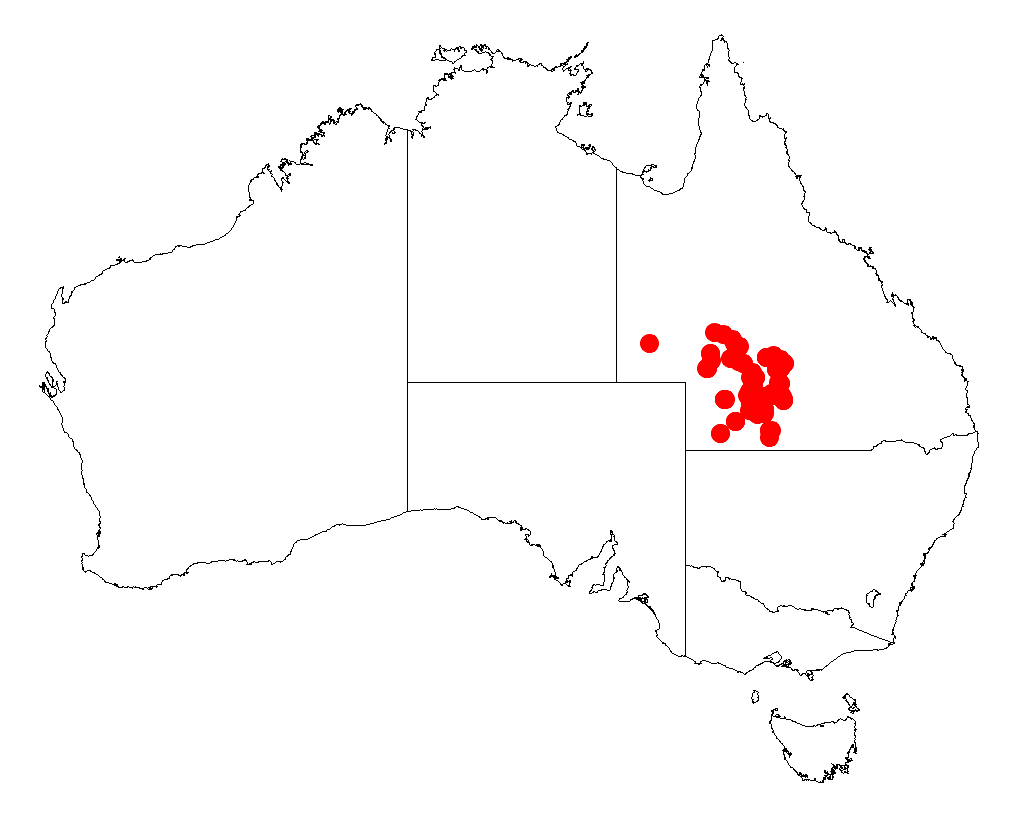
- Occurrence data from AVH

Synonyms
- Racosperma ensifolium (Pedley) Pedley

= Acacia ensifolia =

Species of legume

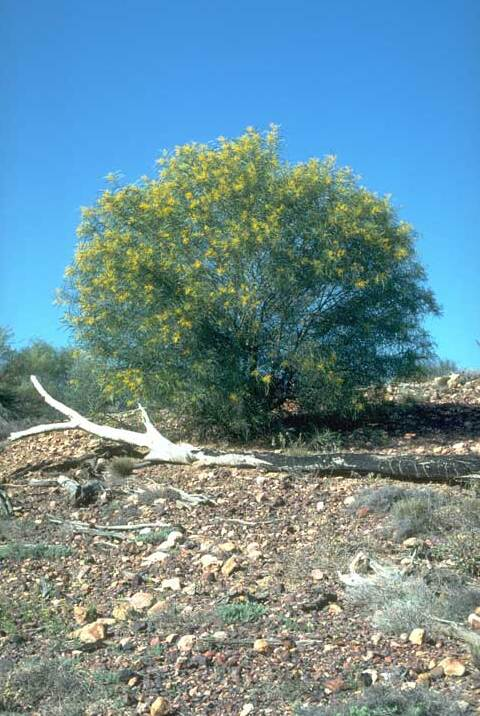
Habit near Adavale

Acacia ensifolia is a species of flowering plant in the family Fabaceae and is endemic to Queensland, Australia. It is a tree with a spreading crown, pendulous linear phyllodes, heads of bright yellow flowers, and firmly papery pods covered with a white, powdery bloom.

== Description ==
Acacia ensifolia is a tree that typically grows to a height of up to 9 m (30 ft), and has a spreading crown and often several trunks. Its phyllodes are normally pendulous, leathery, linear to elliptic, straight or slightly curved 150–270 mm (5.9–10.6 in) long and 3–8 mm (0.12–0.31 in) wide with a prominent midrib. The flowers are borne in 10 to 15 spherical heads in racemes 50–100 mm (2.0–3.9 in) long on peduncles 10–20 mm (0.39–0.79 in) long, each head 7–8 mm (0.28–0.31 in) in diameter with 50 to 60 densely packed, bright yellow flowers. The pods are firmly papery, up to 130 mm (5.1 in) long, 10–18 mm (0.39–0.71 in) wide, glabrous and covered with a white, powdery bloom. The shiny blackish seeds are 4.5–5.0 mm (0.18–0.20 in) long, circular to widely elliptic and lack an aril.

== Taxonomy ==
Acacia ensifolia was first formally described in 1969 by Leslie Pedley in Contributions from the Queensland Herbarium from a specimens collected between Quilpie and Thargomindah in 1957. The specific epithet (ensifolia) means sword-leaved'.

Acacia ensifolia is closely related and appear very similar to A. pruinocarpa which is found further to the west, and also resembles A. pruinocarpa.

== Distribution ==
This species of wattle is confined to the Gray Range in Queensland, between Adavale in the north and Thargomindah in the south where it is found on low hills growing in clay or loam soils. It is part of mulga shrubland communities and found along eastern border of the Simpson Desert ecoregion.

== See also ==
- List of Acacia species
