= Wanyu =

Wanyu may refer to:

== Places ==
- Wanyu, Huarong (万庾镇), a town of Huarong County, Hunan, China

== People ==
- Wang Wanyu (王婉钰; born 1997), Chinese rugby sevens player

== Other ==
- Acacia ramulosa var. linophylla, sometimes known as wanyu, a tree in the family Fabaceae
