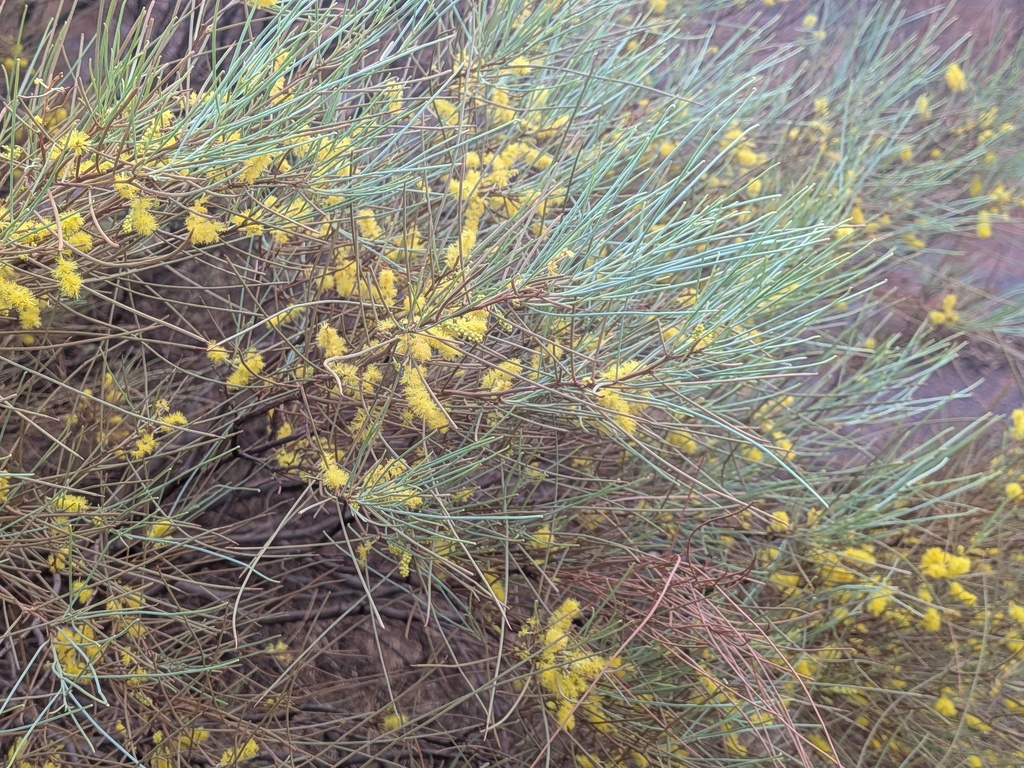
- Near Newman

Scientific classification
- Kingdom: Plantae
- Clade: Embryophytes
- Clade: Tracheophytes
- Clade: Spermatophytes
- Clade: Angiosperms
- Clade: Eudicots
- Clade: Rosids
- Order: Fabales
- Family: Fabaceae
- Subfamily: Caesalpinioideae
- Clade: Mimosoid clade
- Genus: Acacia
- Species: A. wanyu

Binomial name
- Acacia wanyu Tindale
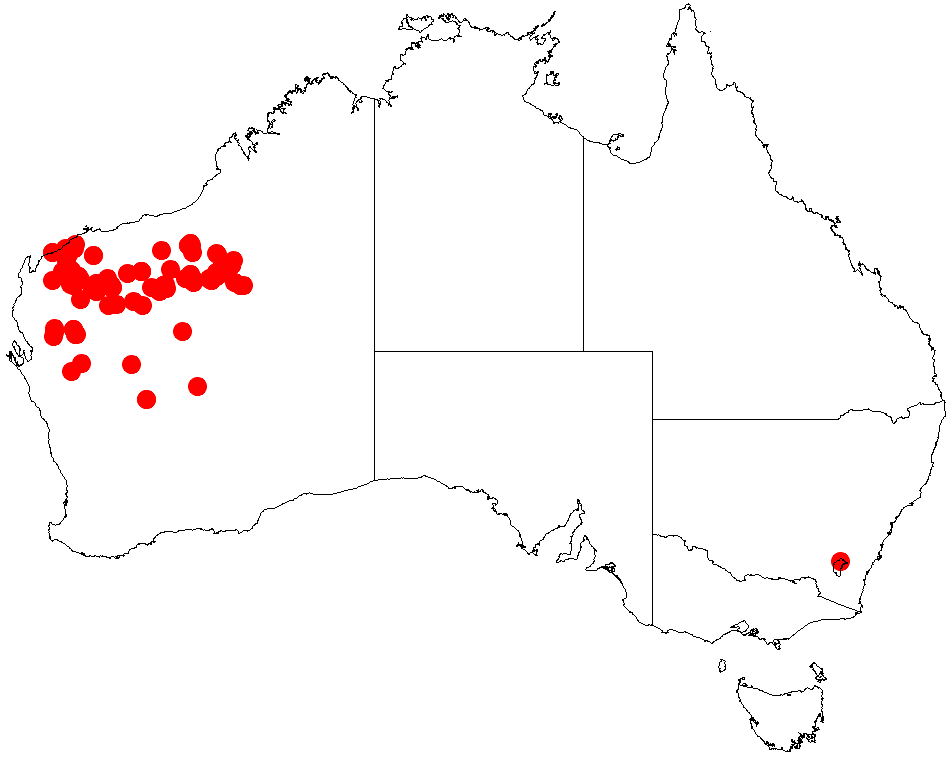
- Occurrence data from AVH

= Acacia wanyu =

Wanyu

Species of legume

Acacia wanyu, commonly known as wanyu or silver-leaf mulga, is a shrub or tree belonging to the genus Acacia and the subgenus Juliflorae that is endemic to arid parts of western Australia. The Kurrama people know it as murruturu or yirritiri while the Nyangumarta people know it as wayartany.

== Description ==
The bushy tree or shrub typically grows to a height of 1.5 to 5 metres (5 to 16 ft). Younger shrubs tend to be multi-stemmed with the mai stems being reasonably straight and have a rounded or obconic habit with sub-rounded crowns. More mature plants often have a gnarled and crooked single-stem with horizontal branches and dense crowns spreading to a width of 2 to 5 m (6 ft 7 in to 16 ft 5 in). The smooth grey bark found on the branches becomes fissured near the base of older stems. The sericeous branchlets are covered in fine silvery white hairs but become glabrous as they age. The pale yellowish green new shoots have a silvery sheen. Like most species of Acacia it has light silvery green or grey-green to bluish green phyllodes rather than true leaves. The slender and terete filiform phyllodes have a length of 5 to 18 cm (2.0 to 7.1 in) and a diameter of 0.8 to 1.3 mm (0.031 to 0.051 in) and are thin and flexible and straight to incurved. They have many fine and parallel longitudinal nerves and an acute apex acute that is not spiny. It blooms from March to July producing yellow flowers. Flowering is thought to be dependent after periods of high rainfall with flowers having been intermittently recorded from February to October. The simple inflorescences occur singly or in pairs in the axils on 3 to 6 mm (0.12 to 0.24 in) long stalks. The flower-spikes have a length of 10 to 30 mm (0.39 to 1.18 in) with light golden flowers that are lightly packed. Following flowering woody seed pods form that are pendulous with an ąmoniliform shape and a length of 6 to 18 cm (2.4 to 7.1 in) and a diameter of 6 to 10 mm (0.24 to 0.39 in)that age to a brown to yellowish colour. The brown seeds inside have a broadly ellipsoid shape and a length of 6 to 9 mm (0.24 to 0.35 in).

== Taxonomy ==
The species was first formally described by the botanist Mary Tindale in 1972 as part of the work Notes on Australian taxa of Acacia published in Contributions from the New South Wales National Herbarium. It was reclassified as Racosperma wanyu in 2003 by Leslie Pedley than transferred back to genus Acacia in 2006. The specific epithet refers to the common name of the species which is also sometimes misapplied to Acacia ramulosa.

== Distribution ==
It is native to an area in the Mid West and Pilbara regions of Western Australia where it is often situated on sand plains or along creeklines and drainage lines where it is found growing in stony clay or loamy or red sandy soils. The species has a scattered distribution with the bulk of the population being found from around Pannawonica in the north west to around Pingandie Station in the Asburton district in the south and out to the Great Sandy Desert in the east with several outlying populations further south. It is commonly a part of low scrub and taller shrubland communities featuring Acacia aneura and other Acacia species.

== See also ==
- List of Acacia species
