= Bowgada, Western Australia =

Bowgada
- Town
- Coordinates: 29.20°S 116.10°E
- Country: Australia
- State: Western Australia
- LGA(s): Shire of Perenjori
- Location: 22 km (14 mi) north west of Perenjori; 23 km (14 mi) south east of Morawa; 366 km (227 mi) north of Perth
- Established: 1913

Government
  - State electorate(s): Moore
  - Federal division(s): Durack

Area
  - Total: 770.2 km^{2} (297.4 sq mi)
- Elevation: 310 m (1,020 ft)

Population
  - Total(s): 33 (SAL 2021)
- Postcode: 6623

Bowgada is a small town in Western Australia located on the Mullewa Wubin Road 366 kilometres (227 mi) north of Perth in the Mid West region.

The townsite was gazetted as Chubble in 1913 but changed to Bowgada in 1914. Bowgada is an Indigenous Australian word used to describe a bush that is found in the local area, Acacia ramulosa.

The town was originally a railway siding on the Wongan Hills to Mullewa railway line for cropping and stock, two industries that still thrive in the area.

In 1932 the Wheat Pool of Western Australia announced that the town would have two grain elevators, each fitted with an engine, installed at the railway siding.

The area had a poor season in 1939, resulting in low yields. The local bulk wheat bin had 110,000 bushels delivered, which was more than expected but not as good as previous harvests.

The main industry of the town is wheat farming, with the town being a Cooperative Bulk Handling grain receival site.
