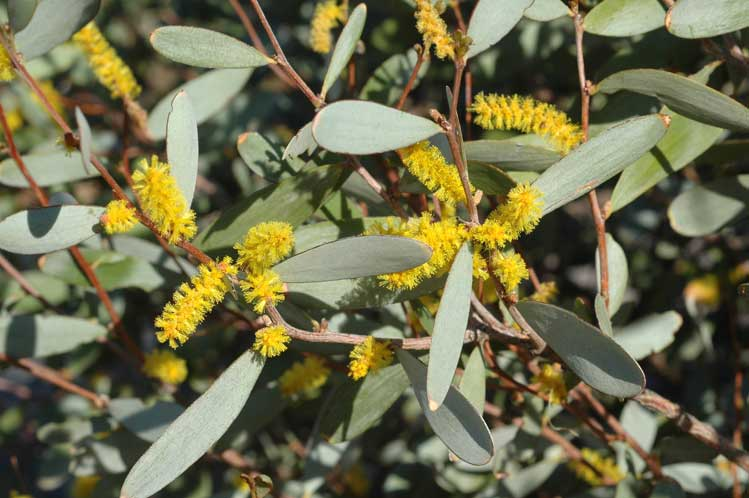

Scientific classification
- Kingdom: Plantae
- Clade: Tracheophytes
- Clade: Angiosperms
- Clade: Eudicots
- Clade: Rosids
- Order: Fabales
- Family: Fabaceae
- Subfamily: Caesalpinioideae
- Clade: Mimosoid clade
- Genus: Acacia
- Species: A. tarculensis

Binomial name
- Acacia tarculensis J.M.Black
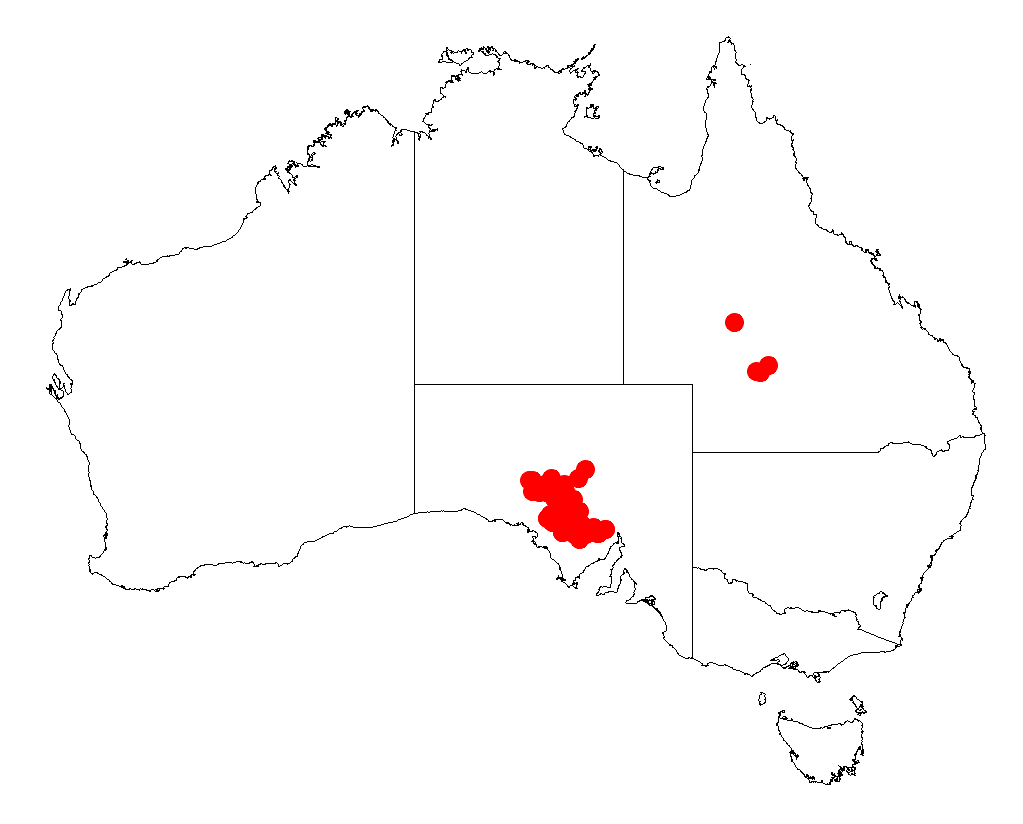
- Occurrence data from AVH

= Acacia tarculensis =

Granite wattle

Species of plant

Acacia tarculensis commonly known as granite wattle, granite bush or steel bush, is a shrub belonging to the genus Acacia and the subgenus Juliflorae that is native to south central Australia.

== Description ==
The dense and spreading shrub typically grows to a height of 1 to 3 m (3 ft 3 in to 9 ft 10 in) and can have a rounded of flat top. Like most species of Acacia it has phyllodes rather than true leaves. The coriaceous grey-green phyllodes have an elliptic to an oblong-elliptic shape with a length of 2.5 to 5.5 cm (0.98 to 2.17 in) and a width of 7 to 14 mm (0.28 to 0.55 in). The phyllodes have golden or silvery hairs when young and have many narrow parallel nerves with one to three nerves that are slightly more prominent than others. It blooms between May and August but sometimes flowers at other times following rain events. The simple inflorescences are found singly or in pairs in the axils. The cylindrical flower-spikes are 15 to 25 mm (0.59 to 0.98 in) in length with bands of golden flowers. The velvety and subwoody seed pods that form after flowering have a narrowly oblong shape and are barely raised over the seeds. The curved pods are up to 9 cm (3.5 in) in length and 10 to 12 mm (0.39 to 0.47 in) wide with thickened margins. The dull brown seeds have a broadly elliptic shape and are around 7.5 mm (0.30 in) in length with a terminal aril.

== Taxonomy ==
The species was first formally described by the botanist John McConnell Black in 1912 in the work Transactions and proceedings of the Royal Society of South Australia. It was reclassified in 2003 by Leslie Pedley as Racosperma tarculense and then transferred back to the Acacia genus in 2006. The specific epithet is derived from the town of Tarcoola from where the type specimen was collected by J.W.Mellor in 1912.

== Distribution ==
It is endemic to southern parts of central South Australia from the northern parts of the Eyre Peninsula in the south to around areas to the west of the Gawler Range and to just north of Tarcoola where it is usually situated on rocky hillsides and ridges that are composed of granite as a part of open and tall shrubland or low woodland communities. It is often associated with other species of Acacia including Acacia aneura, Acacia cibaria and Acacia papyrocarpa growing in shallow compact loamy soils and alkaline red duplex and brown calcareous soils in areas where the average rainfall is 200 to 350 mm (7.9 to 13.8 in) per annum.

== See also ==
- List of Acacia species
