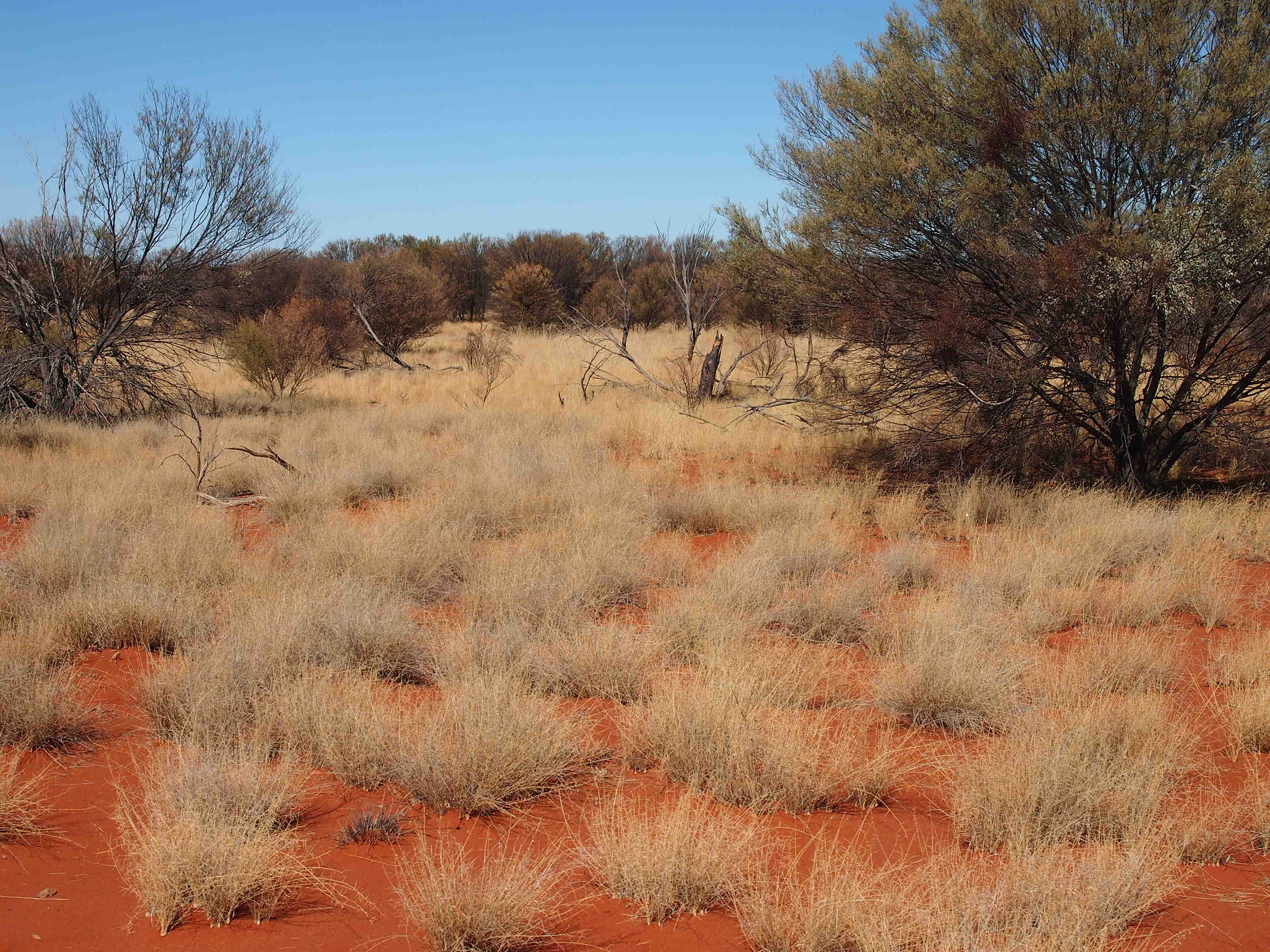
- Mulga

Scientific classification
- Kingdom: Plantae
- Clade: Tracheophytes
- Clade: Angiosperms
- Clade: Monocots
- Clade: Commelinids
- Order: Poales
- Family: Poaceae
- Subfamily: Chloridoideae
- Genus: Eragrostis
- Species: E. eriopoda

Binomial name
- Eragrostis eriopoda Benth.
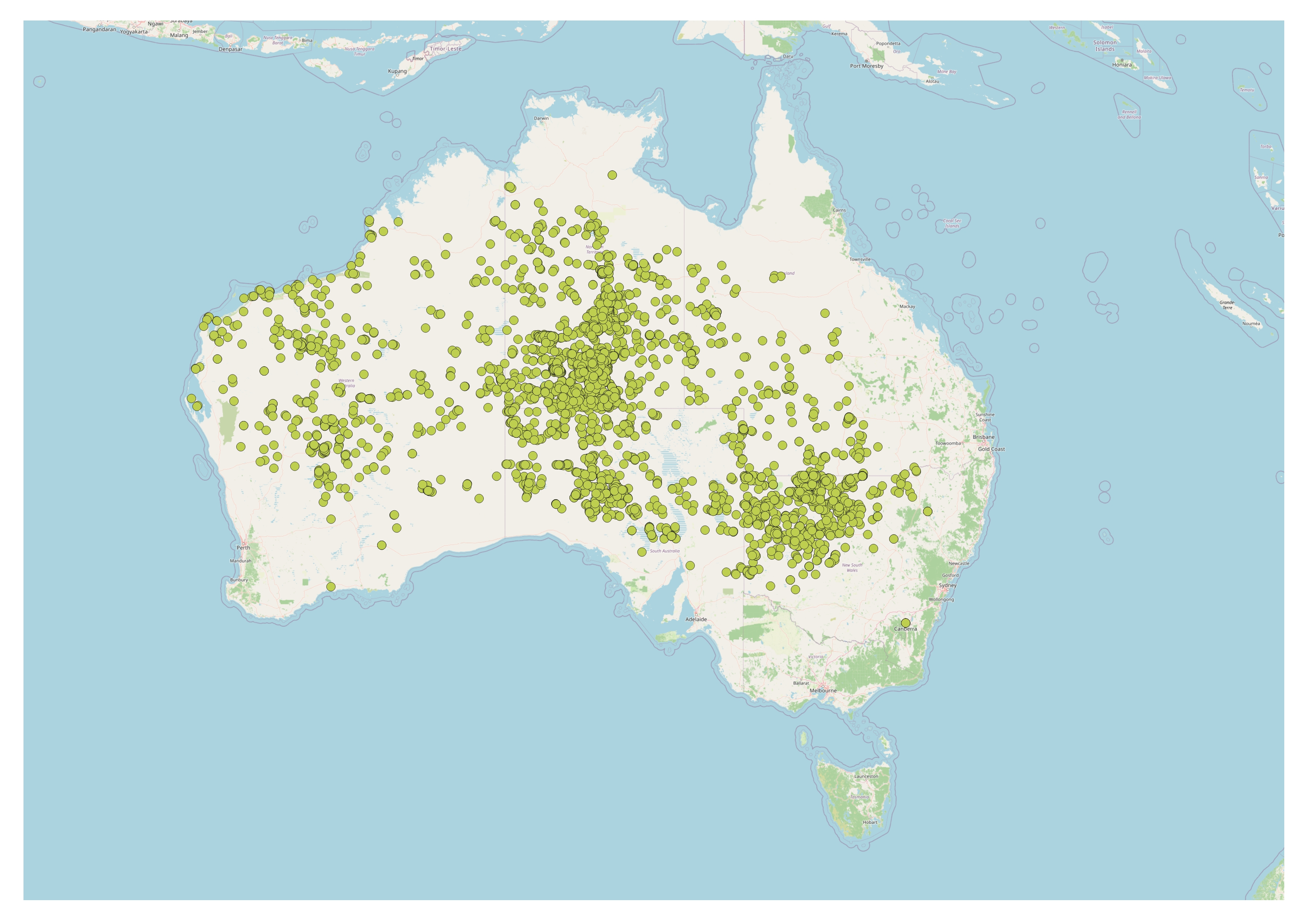
- Distribution of Eragrostis eriopoda

Synonyms
- Eragrostis eriopoda var. curvispicula Domin; Eragrostis setifolia var. dubia Domin

= Eragrostis eriopoda =

Perennial species of grass native to Australia

Eragrostis eriopoda, the woollybutt grass, is a species of love grass in the family Poaceae, native to most of Australia. It is a major grass species of the mulga savanna. In the same genus as teff, its seeds are edible, but very small.

== Description ==
Eragrostis eriopoda is a perennial grass that mostly habitates arid and semi-arid Australia.

The plant grows in a tussock formation, tending to create a ring shape, as the new foliage gorws on the outside, while the older stems die off in the middle. They are typically 30-60cm high, and 15-22cm wide, though this can increase with increased productivity and age. Though the plant does reproduce via seeds, individual plants can regenerate from vegetative buds, meaning it is not solely reliant on seed production.

The stems are stiff, wiry and unbranched. The leaves are small, narrow and pointed, while the seedheads exist on panicles that vary in size. They are 11.5-20cm long, and up to 7.5cm wide at the base, narrowing toward the tip. The root system is deep, allowing the species to persist in unfavourable conditions.

== Ecology ==
Eragrostis eriopoda like many grasses in the Poaceae family utilises C4 photosynthesis, making it more efficient than C3 plants in higher temperatures - something common in arid zones.

Part of E.eriopoda's success in the arid zones may be attributed to its genome. The genus Eragrostis has a large, polyploid genome. This large genome has allowed the species to adapt to more seasonal or arid landscapes, by accommodating the ability to evolve traits to cope with adversity.

Eragrostis eriopoda is a common grass in spinifex country, an area that is subject to high winds, with a sandy soil that relys on the grasses present to retain structure. In semi-arid lands it is less numerous, found in mulga country in the understory of the woody shrubs common here. The soil is typically course to medium textured, acid neutral, red earth.

A large portion of the semi-arid habitat of E. eriopoda has been heavily impacted by agricultural grazing and decreased fire frequency since the removal of Indigenous peoples and their practices from the land post colonisation. These factors together have allowed for woody shrubs to take over the mulga country and push out the grasses.

== Uses ==
E. eriopoda can be utilised as a pasture grass. It is a heavy seeder as well as being drought hardy and fairly resistant to heavy grazing, making it suitable to agriculture in the semi arid zones. The grass itself is quite palatable to stock, and they will choose to graze it.

The seed can be used as a grain through a process called threshing, and is edible, though not particularly popular. Indigenous Australians utilised E. eriopoda in ceremony.

== Taxonomy ==
Taxonomic issues can occur with the Eragrostis genus due to morphological variability within species, making identification more difficult.

=== Etymology ===
Eragrostis has Greek origins. Eros meaning love and Agrostis, the Greek word for an indeterminate herb. Alternatively it could have originated from er meaning early and agrostris meaning wild. Plants in the Eragrostis genus are typically pioneer species, capable of invading disturbed lands, such as after fire.

Eriopoda comes from the Greek erion, (wool) and pous (foot), due to its wooly appearance at the base, and thus its common name wooly butt grass.

== Conservation status ==
Eragrostis eriopoda is not threatened.

== Gallery ==
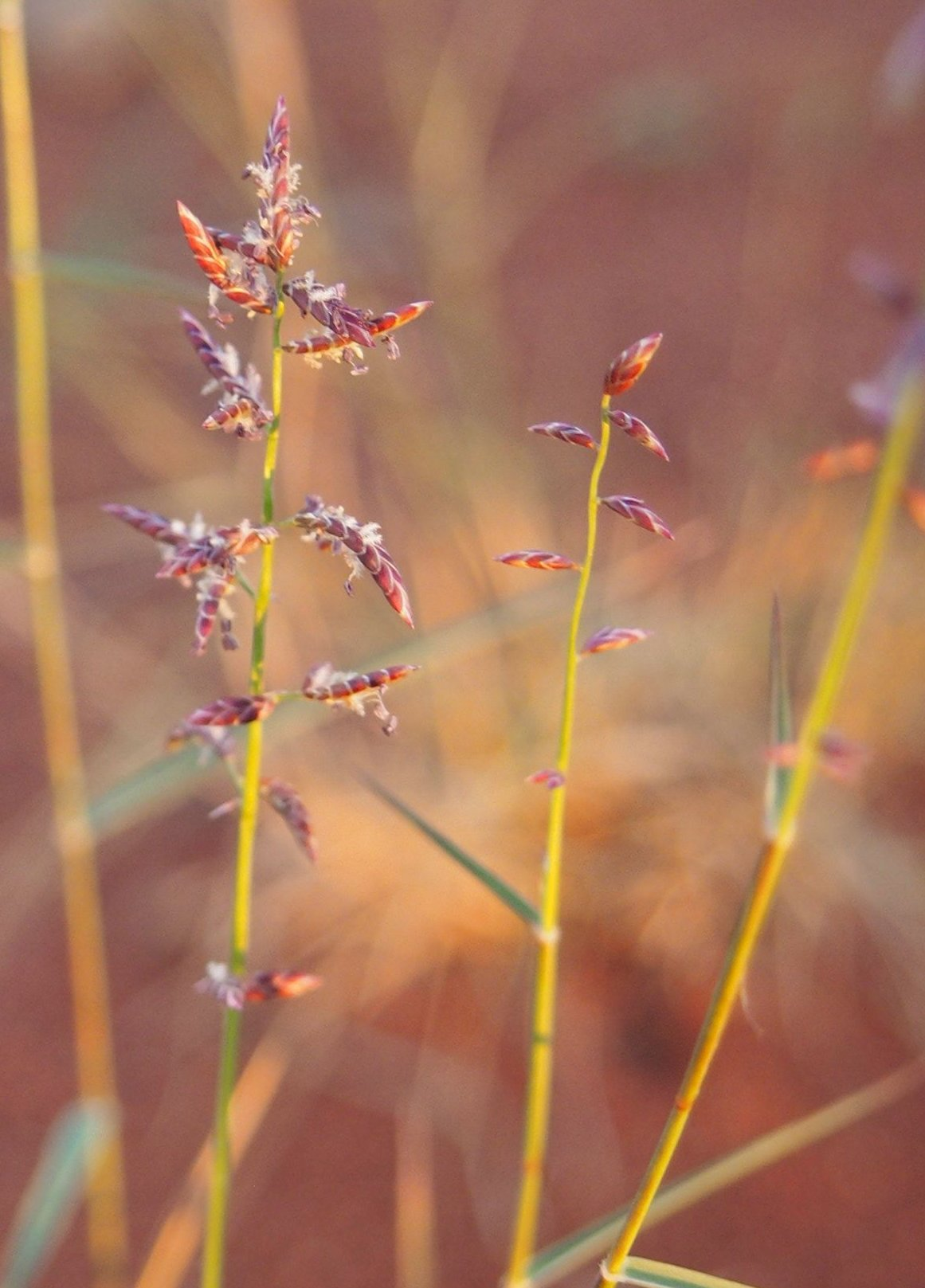
Flowers

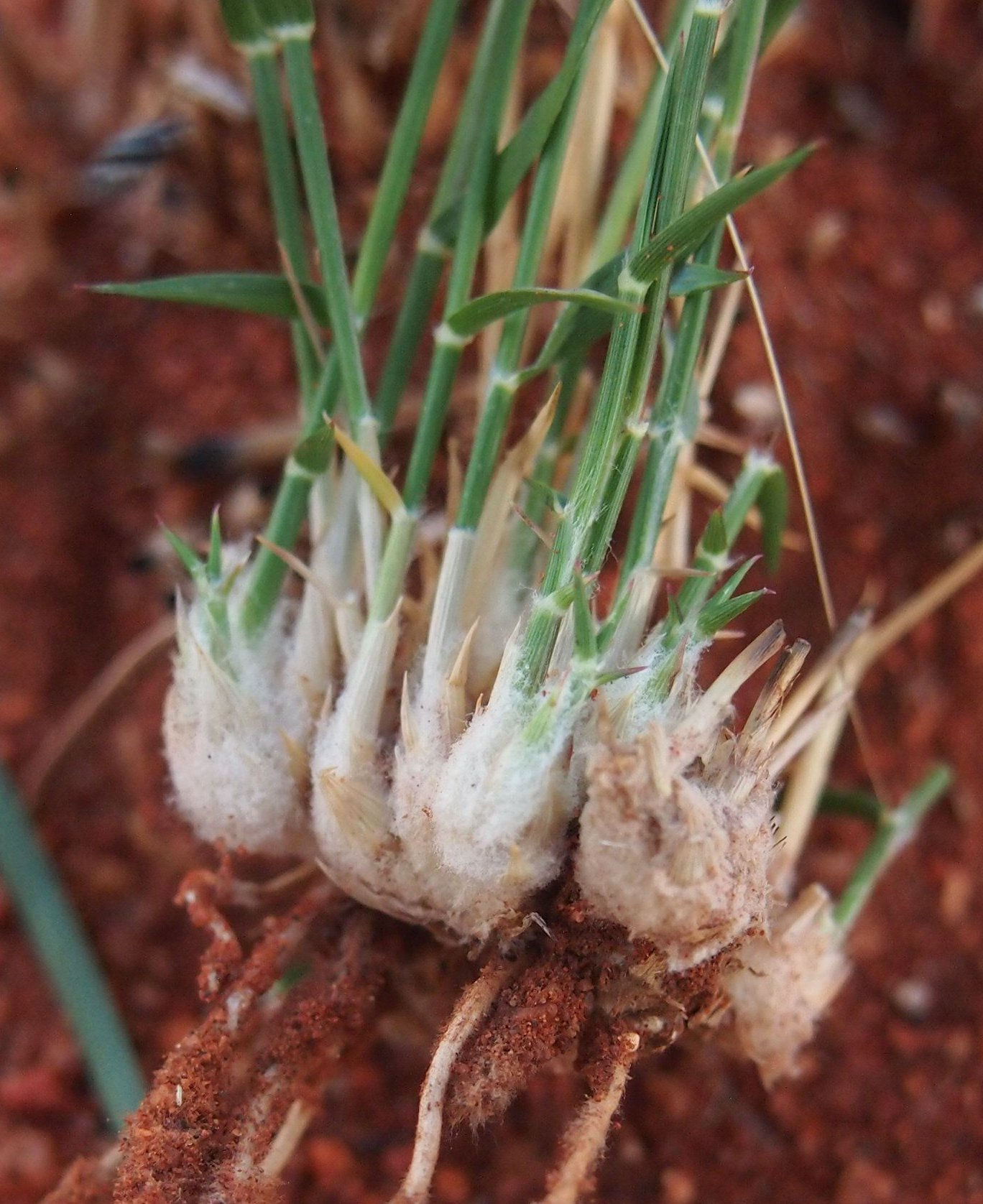
Crowns

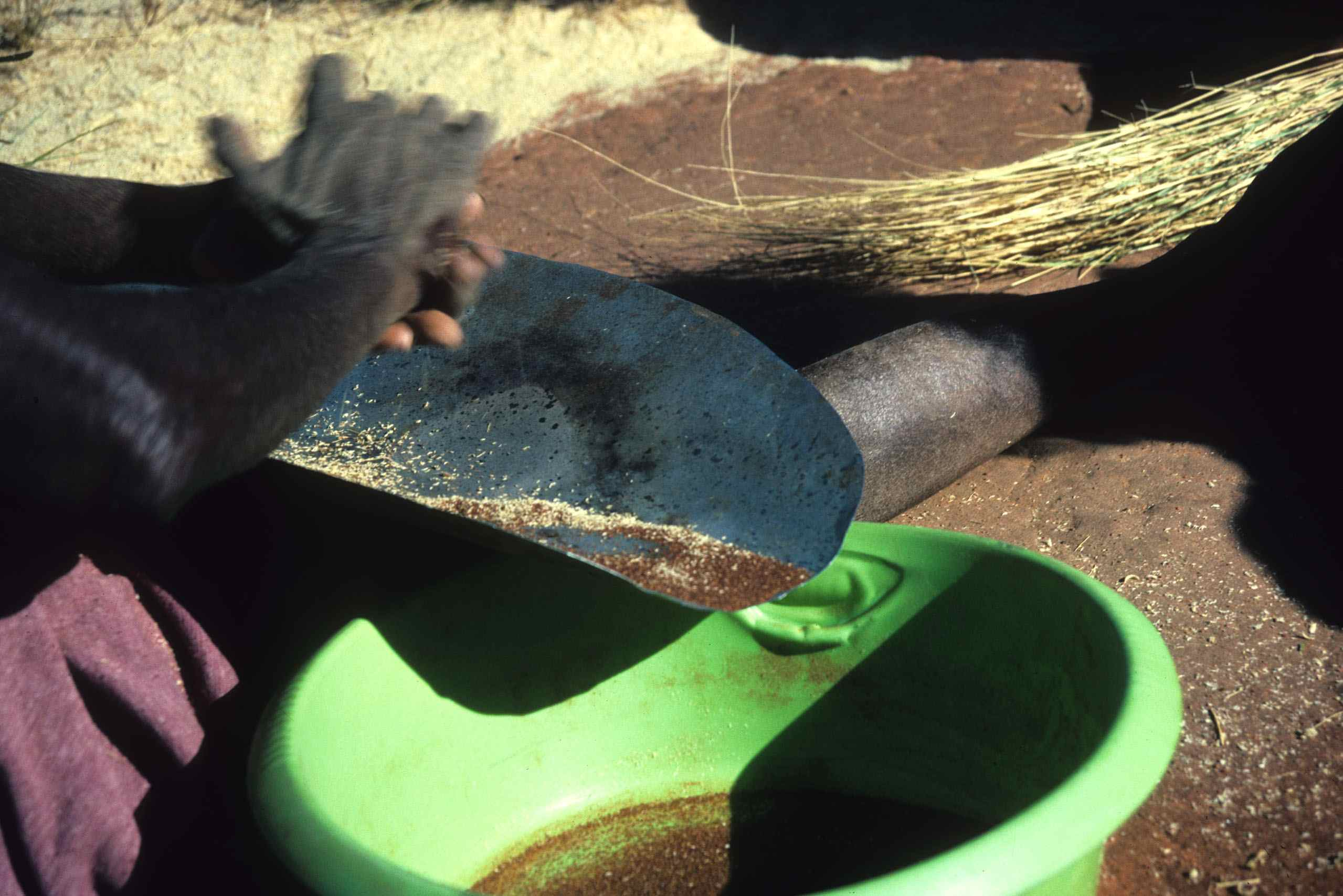
Threshing seeds
