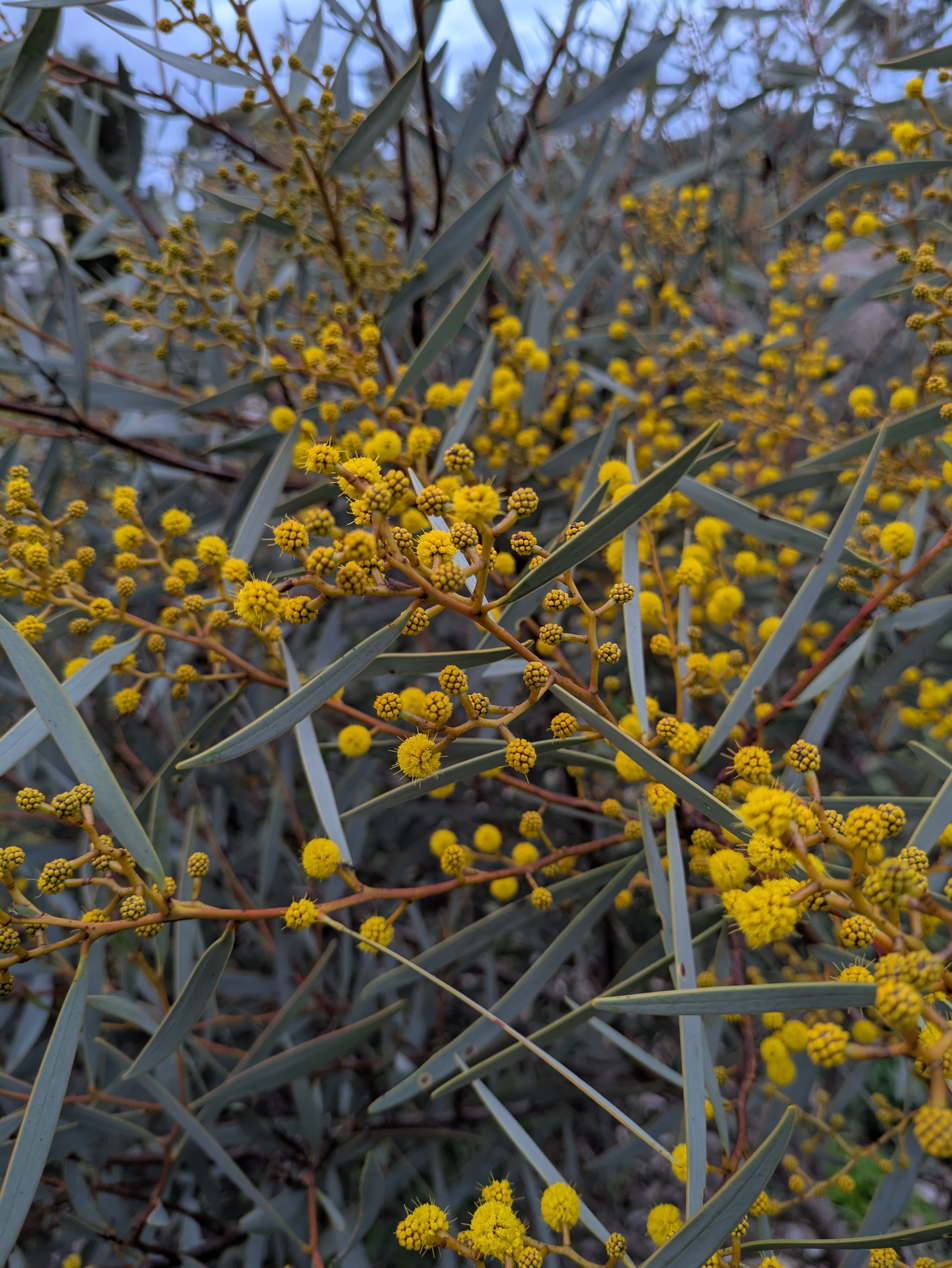

Scientific classification
- Kingdom: Plantae
- Clade: Tracheophytes
- Clade: Angiosperms
- Clade: Eudicots
- Clade: Rosids
- Order: Fabales
- Family: Fabaceae
- Subfamily: Caesalpinioideae
- Clade: Mimosoid clade
- Genus: Acacia
- Species: A. notabilis

Binomial name
- Acacia notabilis F.Muell.
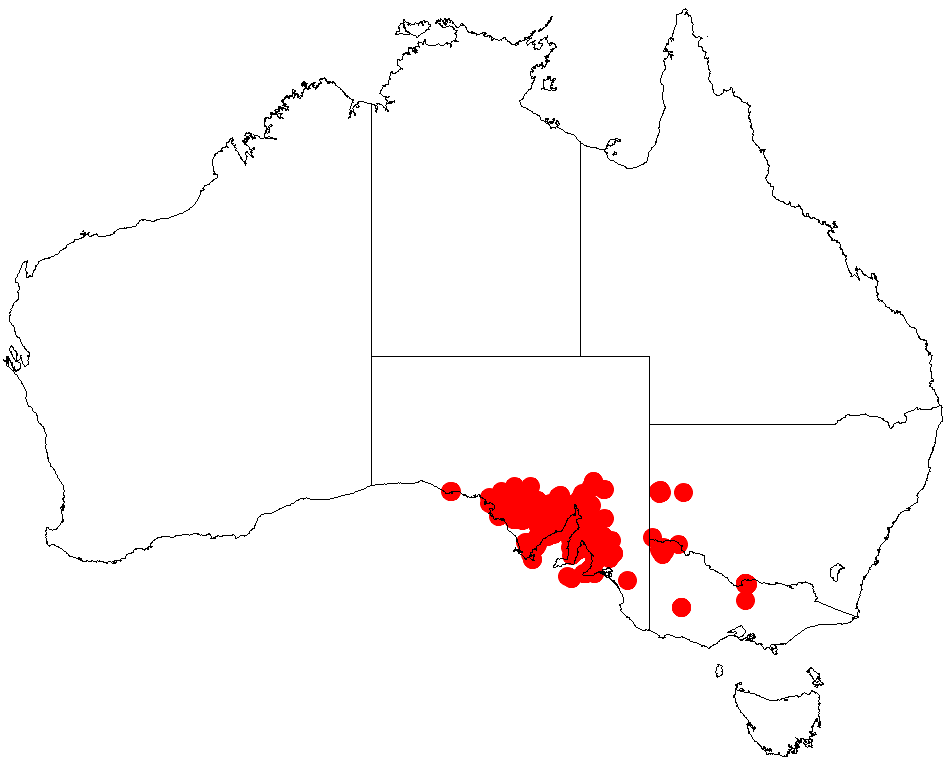
- Occurrence data from AVH

Synonyms
- Acacia notabilis Benth. nom. inval., pro syn.; Acacia notabilis F.Muell. var. notabilis; Racosperma notabile (F.Muell.) Pedley; Acacia obtusata auct. non Sieber ex DC.: Bentham, G. (May 1855)

= Acacia notabilis =

Species of legume

Acacia notabilis, known colloquially as notable wattle, mallee golden wattle, Flinders wattle or stiff golden wattle, is a species of flowering plant in the family Fabaceae, and is endemic to the south-east of mainland Australia. It is a bushy, spreading shrub with glabrous, dark reddish brown bark, narrowly elliptic or lance-shaped phyllodes, spherical heads of bright golden yellow flowers and narrowly oblong, firmly papery to slightly leathery pods raised over the seeds.

== Description ==
Acacia notabilis is a bushy, spreading shrub that typically grows to a height of 1–3 m (3 ft 3 in – 9 ft 10 in) and has reddish-brown bark and glabrous branchlets that are angled near the ends. Its phyllodes are narrowly elliptic to lance-shaped with the narrower end towards the base, 60–130 mm (2.4–5.1 in) long, 8–25 mm (0.31–0.98 in) wide, leathery and grey-green to glaucous with a prominent midrib and marginal veins, and a gland up to 3 mm (0.12 in) above the pulvinus. The pulvinus is 2–6 mm (0.079–0.236 in) long. Flowers are borne in spherical heads in racemes 20–60 mm (0.79–2.36 in) long on stout, glabrous peduncles 2.5–6 mm (0.098–0.236 in) long, each head with 27 to 37 bright golden yellow flowers. Flowering occurs from July to November, and the pods are more or less straight, up to 70 mm (2.8 in) long, 8–13 mm (0.31–0.51 in) wide, firmly papery to slightly leathery, glabrous, stalked and raised on opposite sides over alternate seeds.The seeds are oblong, 4–7 mm (0.16–0.28 in) long with a club-shaped aril.

== Taxonomy ==
Acacia notabilis was first formally described in 1858 by Ferdinand von Mueller in his Fragmenta Phytographiae Australiae. The specific epithet (notabilis) means 'notable', and probably refers to the attractive appearance of the species in the field.

== Distribution and habitat ==
Notable wattle grows in sand or in rocky site in low woodland or open scrub maninly in the Gawler Range, southern Eyre Peninsula and from the Yorke Peninsula to Arkaba Station in South Australia, but it also occurs in scattered places in Victoria including near Nathalia and south of Werrimull and in the Broken Hill area in far western New South Wales.

== See also ==
- List of Acacia species
