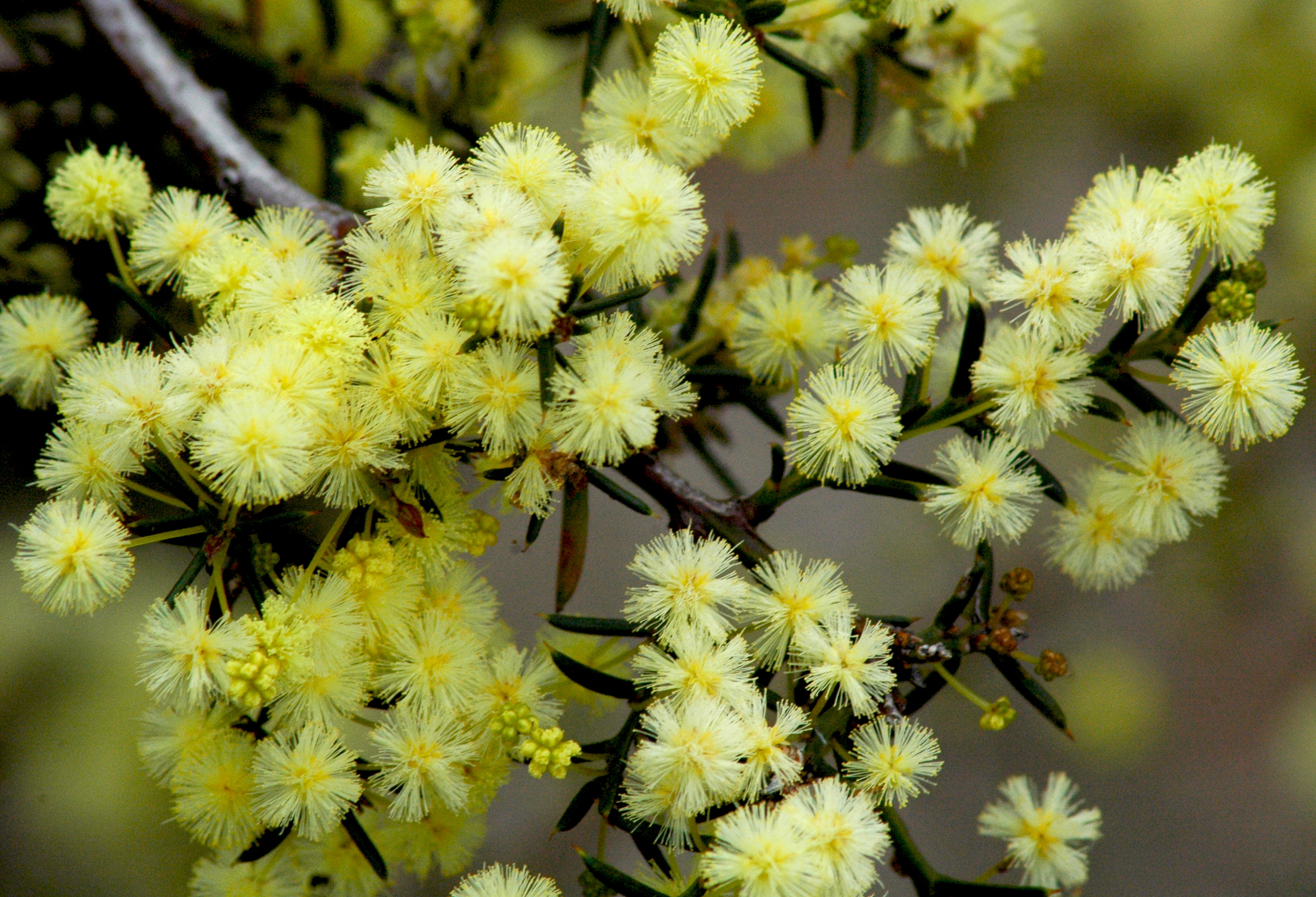

Scientific classification
- Kingdom: Plantae
- Clade: Tracheophytes
- Clade: Angiosperms
- Clade: Eudicots
- Clade: Rosids
- Order: Fabales
- Family: Fabaceae
- Subfamily: Caesalpinioideae
- Clade: Mimosoid clade
- Genus: Acacia
- Species: A. genistifolia

Binomial name
- Acacia genistifolia Link

Synonyms
- List: Acacia cuspidata A.Cunn. ex Benth. nom. illeg.; Acacia cuspidata var. longifolia Benth.; ? Acacia daviesiafolia Loudon nom. inval., nom. nud.; Acacia daviesioides G.Don nom. inval., pro syn.; Acacia diffusa Ker Gawl.; Acacia diffusa var. cuspidata (A.Cunn. ex Benth.) Benth.; Acacia diffusa Ker Gawl. var. diffusa; Acacia prostrata Lodd., G.Lodd. & W.Lodd.; Acacia trinervata var. brevifolia Benth. p.p.; Phyllodoce genistaefolia Link orth. var.; Phyllodoce genistifolia (Link) Link; Racosperma genistifolium (Link) Pedley

= Acacia genistifolia =

Species of legume

Acacia genistifolia commonly known as spreading wattle or early wattle, is a species of flowering plant in the family Fabaceae and is endemic to south-eastern Australia. It is an open, erect, straggly or spreading shrub with sessile, more or less rigid, sharply pointed phyllodes, spherical heads of cream-coloured to rich lemon yellow flowers, and linear, thinly leathery pods raised over the seeds.

== Description ==
Acacia genistifolia is an open, erect, straggly or spreading shrub that typically grows to a height of 0.6–3 m (2 ft 0 in – 9 ft 10 in) high and has ribbed branchlets. The phyllodes are sessile, straight or slightly curved, flat and sharply pointed, 10–40 mm (0.39–1.57 in) long and 1–3 mm (0.039–0.118 in) wide with a gland 2–4 mm (0.079–0.157 in) above the base of the phyllode. There are stipules about 1 mm (0.039 in) long at the base of the phyllodes, but sometimes fall off early. The flowers are usually borne in two or four spherical heads in axils on peduncles 10–20 mm (0.39–0.79 in) long, each head with 12 to 25 cream-coloured to lemon yellow flowers. Flowering usually occurs from July to October and pods are linear, curved to more or less straight, 40–110 mm (1.6–4.3 in) long, 4–7 mm (0.16–0.28 in) wide, thinly leathery and raised over the seeds. The seeds are 3.5–5.5 mm (0.14–0.22 in) long with an aril on the end.

== Taxonomy ==
Acacia genistifolia was first formally described in 1822 by Johann Heinrich Friedrich Link and the description was published in Enumeratio Plantarum Horti Botanici Regii Berolinensis Altera. The specific epithet (genistifolia) refers to this species likeness to some species of the genus Genista.

== Distribution and habitat ==
Spreading wattle grows in a range of soil types in sclerophyll forest or heathland south from Bathurst and west to Grenfell and Griffith in south-eastern New South Wales. It is widespread in Victoria, apart from the mallee and higher parts of the Great Dividing Range. The species is abundant in northern and eastern Tasmania, including on Flinders and Bruny Islands but it is only found north of Mintaro in South Australia.

== See also ==
- List of Acacia species
