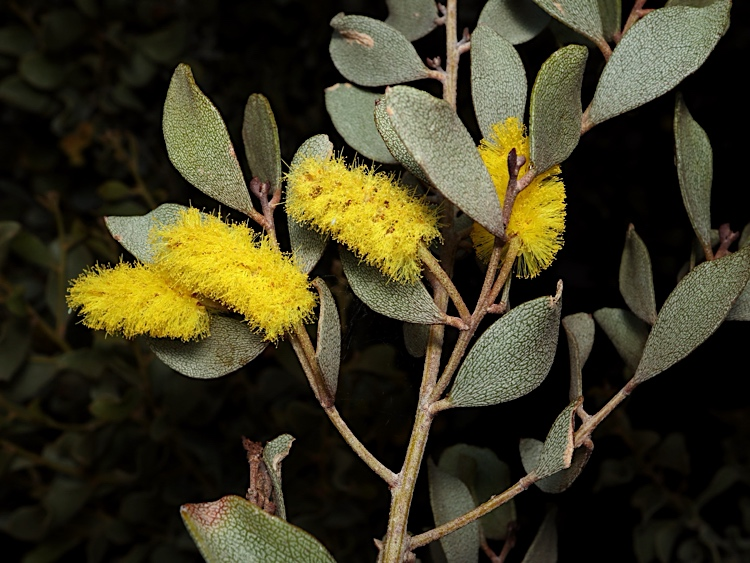

Scientific classification
- Kingdom: Plantae
- Clade: Embryophytes
- Clade: Tracheophytes
- Clade: Angiosperms
- Clade: Eudicots
- Clade: Rosids
- Order: Fabales
- Family: Fabaceae
- Subfamily: Caesalpinioideae
- Clade: Mimosoid clade
- Genus: Acacia
- Species: A. craspedocarpa

Binomial name
- Acacia craspedocarpa F. Muell.
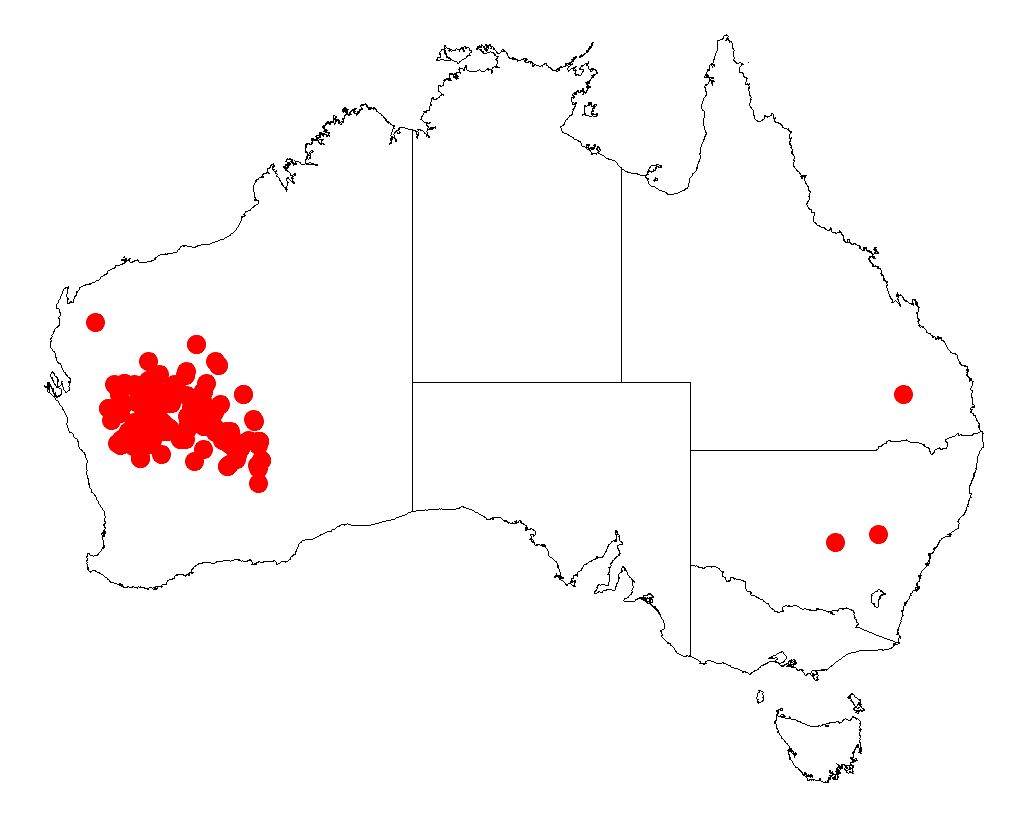
- Occurrence data from AVH

= Acacia craspedocarpa =

Hop mulga

Species of legume

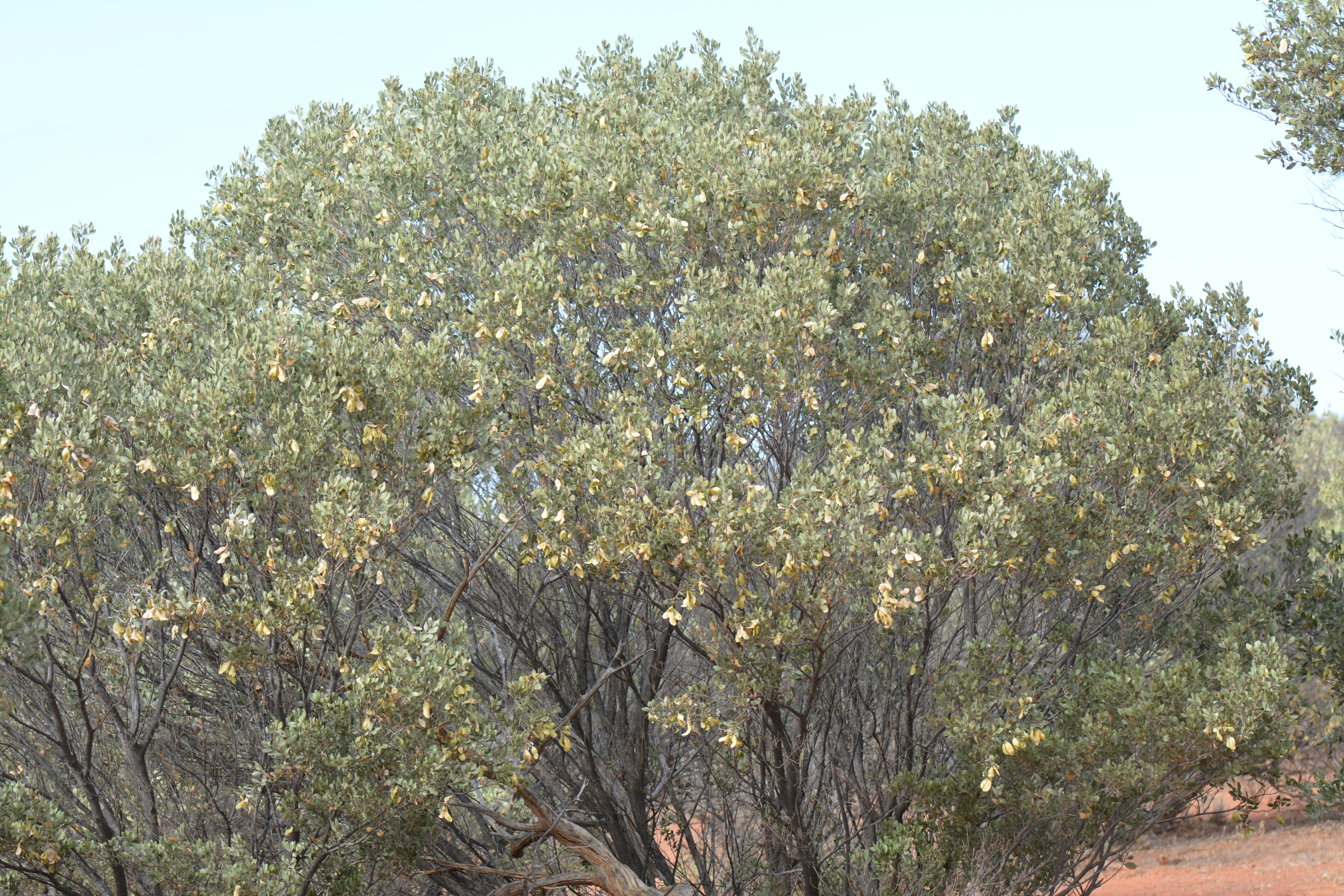
Habit near Cue

Acacia craspedocarpa, commonly known as hop mulga or broad-leaved mulga, is a species of flowering plant in the family Fabaceae and is endemic to central parts of Western Australia. It is a dense, rounded or cone-shaped shrub with dark brown to black branchlets, elliptic to oblong, egg-shaped phyllodes, spikes of yellow flowers and stalkless, thickly leathery, winged pods.

== Description ==
Acacia craspedocarpa is an erect, rounded or cone-shaped shrub that typically grows to 1–4 m (3 ft 3 in – 13 ft 1 in) high and about the same width, but occasionally a tree to 8 m (26 ft). It has sticky, dark brown to black branchlets with resinous ribs at the extremities. The phyllodes are elliptic to oblong or egg-shaped, occasionally almost round, 15–30 mm (0.59–1.18 in) long and 7–13 mm (0.28–0.51 in) wide with one to three main veins. The flowers are yellow and borne in a spike 7–20 mm (0.28–0.79 in) long in axils on a peduncle mostly 6–15 mm (0.24–0.59 in) long. Flowering occurs from March to September, and the pods are stalkless, thickly leathery to more or less woody, 40–60 mm (1.6–2.4 in) long and 15–30 mm (0.59–1.18 in) wide, yellowish to light brown, including a prominent wing 1.5–4 mm (0.059–0.157 in) wide. The seeds are more or less round, 8.5–10.5 mm (0.33–0.41 in) long and 7–9 mm (0.28–0.35 in) wide with a small, cup-shaped cream-coloured or pale yellow aril on the end. The seed pods resemble those of the hop plant.

== Taxonomy ==
Acacia craspedocarpa was first formally described in 1887 by Ferdinand von Mueller in The Chemist and Druggist of Australasia. The specific epithet (craspedocarpa) means 'edge-fruited', referring to the broad, marginal wing of the pods.

== Distribution and habitat ==
Hop mulga is endemic to arid and semi-arid areas in south-central Western Australia where it grows in, and along watercourses, in loamy or clayey soils between Byro Station and Yalgoo in the west and Wiluna, Laverton and near Kalgoorlie in the east, in the Gascoyne, Little Sandy Desert, Murchison and Yalgoo bioregions of Western Australia.

== Conservation status ==
Acacia craspedocarpa is listed as "not threatened" by the Government of Western Australia Department of Biodiversity, Conservation and Attractions.

== Use in horticulture ==
The ornamental medium to tall plant is available commercially and grows well drained light to heavy soils in full sun or partial shade and is drought tolerant once it is established. It will also tolerate a light frost to around −8 °C (18 °F) It is quite long lived and can grow well in a container.

== See also ==
- List of Acacia species
