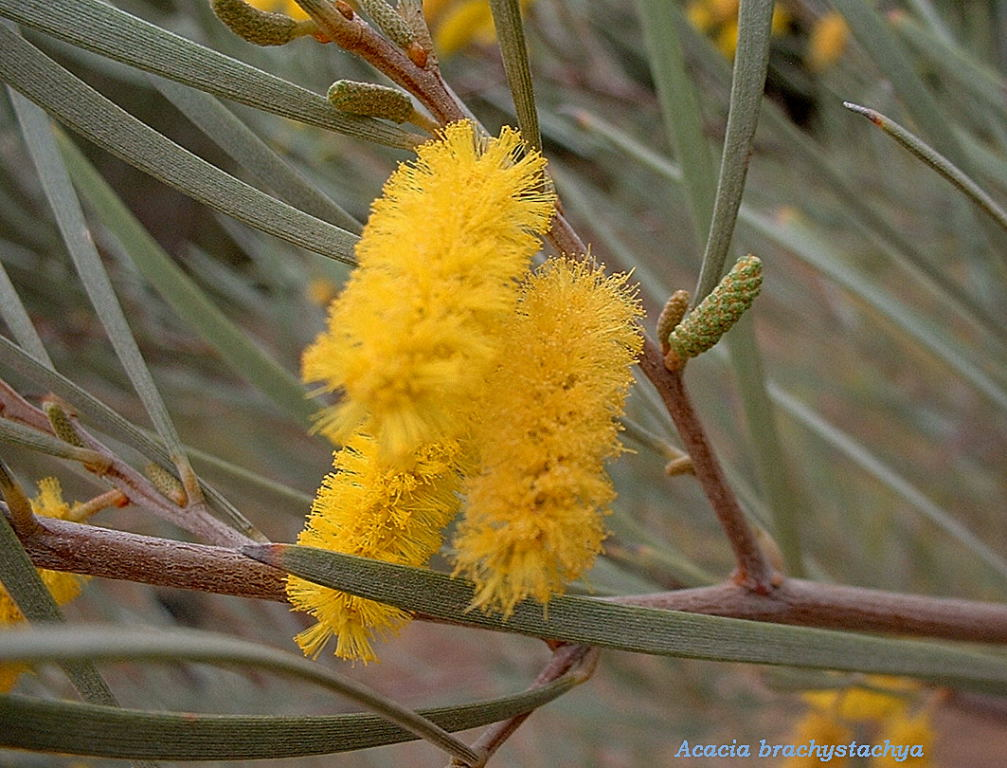

Scientific classification
- Kingdom: Plantae
- Clade: Tracheophytes
- Clade: Angiosperms
- Clade: Eudicots
- Clade: Rosids
- Order: Fabales
- Family: Fabaceae
- Subfamily: Caesalpinioideae
- Clade: Mimosoid clade
- Genus: Acacia
- Species: A. brachystachya

Binomial name
- Acacia brachystachya Benth.
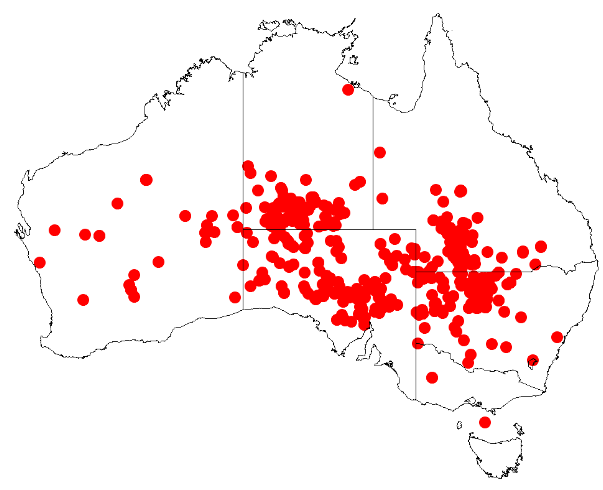
- Occurrence data from AVH

Synonyms
- ? Acacia aneura var. ? stenocarpa Benth. nom. illeg.; Acacia aneura var. brachystachya (Benth.) F.Muell. ex Maiden; Acacia aneura var. stenocarpa F.Muell.; Acacia cibaria F.Muell.; Acacia stenocarpa F.Muell. nom. illeg.; Racosperma brachystachyum (Benth.) Pedley

= Acacia brachystachya =

Umbrella mulga

Species of plant

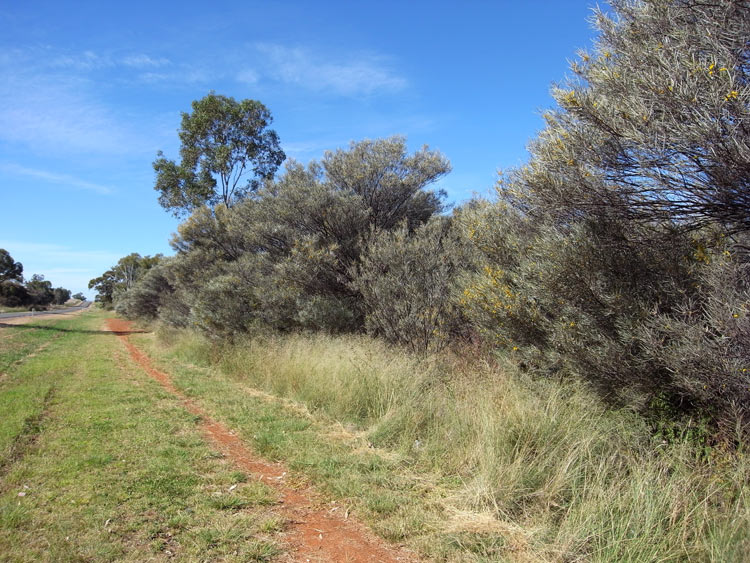
Habit near Parkes

Acacia brachystachya commonly known as umbrella mulga, umbrella wattle, turpentine mulga, grey mulga or false bowgada, is a species of flowering plant in the family Fabaceae and is endemic to Australia. It is a erect or spreading, bushy shrub or tree with grey bark, straight linear or slightly curved phyllodes, cylindrical heads of bright yellow flowers, and straight pods. It is native to all mainland Australian states except Victoria, and also occurs in the Northern Territory.

== Description ==
Acacia brachystachya grows as an erect or spreading bushy shrub or tree 2–6 m (6 ft 7 in – 19 ft 8 in) high and 5 m (16 ft) wide and grey, smooth or fissured bark. The phyllodes are rigid, linear or slightly curved, 40–160 mm (1.6–6.3 in) long and 1–3 mm (0.039–0.118 in) wide and more or less glaucous with many closely spaced veins, and hairs pressed against the surface. The flowers are bright yellow and borne in one or two cylindrical heads 13–20 mm (0.51–0.79 in) long, in axils on a peduncle 2–8 mm (0.079–0.315 in) long. Flowering usually occurs from April to August, depending on weather conditions, and the pods are more or less straight, slightly flattened, 20–80 mm (0.79–3.15 in) long, 4–8 mm (0.16–0.31 in) wide and sticky, containing seeds 5–8 mm (0.20–0.31 in) long and 3–5 mm (0.12–0.20 in) wide with a thread-like aril.

== Taxonomy ==
Acacia brachystachya was first formally described in 1864 by George Bentham in his Flora Australiensis from specimens collected on the "Mutanie Ranges" in New South Wales during the Bourke and Wills expedition. The specific epithet (brachystachys) means 'a short ear of corn', referring to the relatively short flower spikes.

== Distribution and habitat ==
Acacia brachystachya is found in all continental Australian states except Victoria, and also in the Northern Territory. It often grows in sandy loam with Acacia aneura and on shallow, stony soils. In Western Australia it is found in the Central Ranges, Gibson Desert, Great Sandy Desert, Little Sandy Desert, Murchison and Nullarbor bioregions, in the southern half of the Northern Territory the northern part of South Australia, south-western Queensland and the western half on New South Wales.

== See also ==
- List of Acacia species
