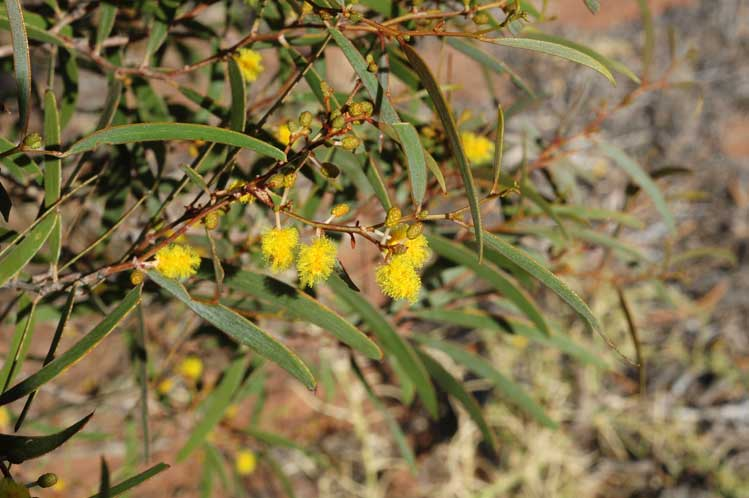
- In the Australian Arid Lands Botanic Garden, Port Augusta.

Scientific classification
- Kingdom: Plantae
- Clade: Embryophytes
- Clade: Tracheophytes
- Clade: Spermatophytes
- Clade: Angiosperms
- Clade: Eudicots
- Clade: Rosids
- Order: Fabales
- Family: Fabaceae
- Subfamily: Caesalpinioideae
- Clade: Mimosoid clade
- Genus: Acacia
- Species: A. quadrimarginea

Binomial name
- Acacia quadrimarginea F.Muell
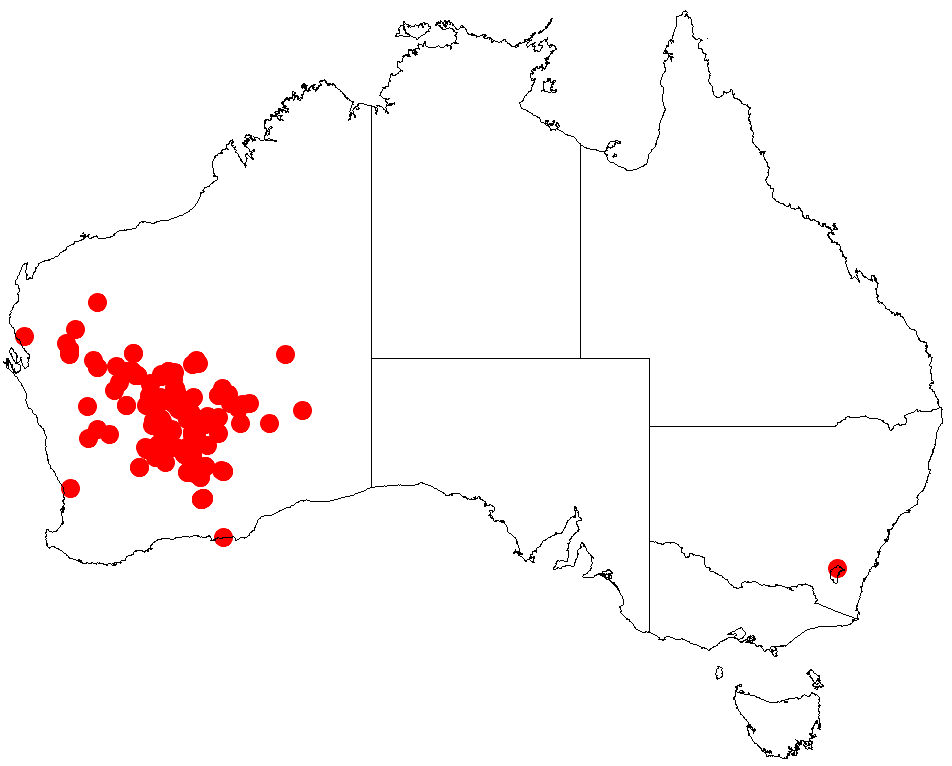
- Occurrence data from AVH

= Acacia quadrimarginea =

Granite wattle

Species of legume

Acacia quadrimarginea, commonly known as granite wattle or spreading wattle, is a tree in the family Mimosaceae. Endemic to Western Australia, it occurs through arid south-central Western Australia. It is common on granite, but also occurs on sand and clay, and is often seen along creeklines in rocky hills.

Granite wattle grows as a small tree up to six metres high, and often wider than it is high. Like most Acacia species, it has phyllodes rather than true leaves. These are green with a faint red margin, up to ten centimetres long, and slightly curved. The flowers are yellow, and held in cylindrical clusters. The pods are four sided and thick, up to fifteen centimetres long.

== See also ==
- List of Acacia species
