= Acacia ramulosa var. linophylla =

Bowgada

Scientific classification
- Kingdom: Plantae
- Clade: Tracheophytes
- Clade: Angiosperms
- Clade: Eudicots
- Clade: Rosids
- Order: Fabales
- Family: Fabaceae
- Subfamily: Caesalpinioideae
- Clade: Mimosoid clade
- Genus: Acacia
- Species: A. ramulosa
- Variety: A. r. var. linophylla

Trinomial name
- Acacia ramulosa var. linophylla W.Fitzg. (Pedley)

Variety of legume

Acacia ramulosa var. linophylla, commonly known as bowgada, wanderry mulga, horse mulga or sometimes wanyu, is a subspecies of the tree species Acacia ramulosa, with which it shares several common names. While the parent species is found throughout arid Australia, this subspecies is much more restricted, being found only on loose red sand in south central Western Australia and sporadically in South Australia. The species was formally named Acacia linophylla until 2001, when it was recognised as a variety of Acacia ramulosa.

This species grows as a spreading shrub or low tree, up to four metres long and often wider than it is high. Like most Acacia species, it has phyllodes rather than true leaves. These are greyish green in colour, round in cross-section, and held almost vertically; they may be up to thirteen centimetres long and two millimetres in diameter. The flowers are yellow, and held in cylindrical clusters about two centimetres long. The pods are thick and woody, up to ten centimetres long and one centimetre wide, with deep fissures along their length.

== See also ==
- List of Acacia species
