= List of grasses of Puerto Rico =

The grass family Poaceae is the largest group of flowering plants present on the island of Puerto Rico. With 258 species, it represents 9% of all Angiosperms and 33% of all Monocots.

The following is a list of grass species known to exist in Puerto Rico, separated by genus:

== Agrostis ==
Agrostis hyemalis

== Andropogon ==
Andropogon bicornis
Andropogon glomeratus
Andropogon gracilis
Andropogon leucostachyus
Andropogon virginicus

== Anthephora ==
Anthephora hermaphrodita

== Aristida ==
Aristida adscensionis
Aristida chaseae
Aristida portoricensis
Aristida refracta
Aristida spiciformis
Aristida suringarii
Aristida swartziana

== Arthraxon ==
Arthraxon castratus

== Arthrostylidium ==
Arthrostylidium farctum
Arthrostylidium multispicatum
Arthrostylidium sarmentosum

== Arundinella ==
Arundinella hispida

== Arundo ==
Arundo donax

== Avena ==
Avena sativa

== Axonopus ==
Axonopus aureus
Axonopus compressus
Axonopus fissifolius

== Bambusa ==
Bambusa multiplex
Bambusa vulgaris

== Bothriochloa ==
Bothriochloa ischaemum
Bothriochloa pertusa
Bothriochloa saccharoides

== Bouteloua ==
Bouteloua americana
Bouteloua juncea
Bouteloua repens

== Brachyelytrum ==
Brachyelytrum erectum

== Cenchrus ==
Cenchrus brownii
Cenchrus echinatus
Cenchrus gracillimus
Cenchrus myosuroides
Cenchrus spinifex

== Chloris ==
Chloris barbata
Chloris ciliata
Chloris cubensis
Chloris elata
Chloris radiata
Chloris sagraeana

== Chusquea ==
Chusquea abietifolia

== Coix ==
Coix lacryma-jobi

== Cymbopogon ==
Cymbopogon citratus
Cymbopogon nardus

== Cynodon ==
Cynodon dactylon
Cynodon nlemfuensis

== Dactylis ==
Dactylis glomerata

== Dactyloctenium ==
Dactyloctenium aegyptium

== Dichanthelium ==
Dichanthelium aciculare
Dichanthelium acuminatum
Dichanthelium dichotomum
Dichanthelium leucothrix
Dichanthelium ovale
Dichanthelium sabulorum
Dichanthelium scoparium
Dichanthelium strigosum

== Dichanthium ==
Dichanthium annulatum
Dichanthium aristatum

== Diectomis ==
Diectomis fastigiata
Diectomis argillacea
Diectomis bicornis
Diectomis ciliaris
Diectomis dolichophylla
Diectomis eriantha
Diectomis horizontalis
Diectomis insularis
Diectomis ischaemum
Diectomis longiflora
Diectomis nuda
Diectomis panicea
Diectomis sanguinalis
Diectomis setigera
Diectomis similis
Diectomis villosa
Diectomis violascens

== Echinochloa ==
Echinochloa colona
Echinochloa crus-galli
Echinochloa crus-pavonis
Echinochloa polystachya
Echinochloa stagnina

== Eleusine ==
Eleusine indica

== Eragrostis ==
Eragrostis amabilis
Eragrostis barrelieri
Eragrostis ciliaris
Eragrostis curvula
Eragrostis elliottii
Eragrostis glutinosa
Eragrostis hypnoides
Eragrostis pectinacea
Eragrostis pilosa
Eragrostis urbaniana

== Eremochloa ==
Eremochloa ophiuroides

== Eriochloa ==
Eriochloa polystachya
Eriochloa punctata

== Eriochrysis ==
Eriochrysis cayennensis

== Euclasta ==
Euclasta condylotricha

== Eustachys ==
Eustachys petraea

== Gymnopogon ==
Gymnopogon foliosus

== Gynerium ==
Gynerium sagittatum

== Hackelochloa ==
Hackelochloa granularis

== Heteropogon ==
Heteropogon contortus

== Holcus ==
Holcus lanatus

== Homolepis ==
Homolepis glutinosa

== Hymenachne ==
Hymenachne amplexicaulis

== Hyparrhenia ==
Hyparrhenia rufa

== Hypogynium ==
Hypogynium virgatum

== Ichnanthus ==
Ichnanthus nemorosus
Ichnanthus pallens
Ichnanthus tenuis

== Imperata ==
Imperata brasiliensis
Imperata contracta

== Isachne ==
Isachne angustifolia

== Lasiacis ==
Lasiacis divaricata
Lasiacis grisebachii
Lasiacis ligulata
Lasiacis sloanei
Lasiacis sorghoidea

== Leersia ==
Leersia hexandra
Leersia monandra

== Leptochloa ==
Leptochloa fusca
Leptochloa nealleyi
Leptochloa panicea
Leptochloa panicoides
Leptochloa scabra
Leptochloa virgata

== Leptochloopsis ==
Leptochloopsis virgata

== Leptocoryphium ==
Leptocoryphium lanatum

== Lithachne ==
Lithachne pauciflora

== Lolium ==
Lolium perenne

== Melinis ==
Melinis minutiflora
Melinis repens

== Microstegium ==
Microstegium vimineum

== Muhlenbergia ==
Muhlenbergia capillaris

== Olyra ==
Olyra latifolia

== Oplismenus ==
Oplismenus hirtellus

== Oryza ==
Oryza latifolia
Oryza sativa

== Panicum ==
Panicum dichotomiflorum
Panicum diffusum
Panicum elephantipes
Panicum ghiesbreghtii
Panicum laxum
Panicum miliaceum
Panicum parvifolium
Panicum rigidulum
Panicum schiffneri
Panicum stenodes
Panicum stevensianum
Panicum tenerum
Panicum trichanthum
Panicum trichoides
Panicum venezuelae

== Pappophorum ==
Pappophorum pappiferum

== Paspalum ==
Paspalum arundinaceum
Paspalum bakeri
Paspalum blodgettii
Paspalum boscianum
Paspalum caespitosum
Paspalum clavuliferum
Paspalum conjugatum
Paspalum convexum
Paspalum decumbens
Paspalum densum
Paspalum dilatatum
Paspalum dispar
Paspalum distichum
Paspalum fasciculatum
Paspalum fimbriatum
Paspalum laxum
Paspalum macrophyllum
Paspalum maritimum
Paspalum millegrana
Paspalum minus
Paspalum molle
Paspalum notatum
Paspalum orbiculatum
Paspalum paniculatum
Paspalum parviflorum
Paspalum paucispicatum
Paspalum pleostachyum
Paspalum plicatulum
Paspalum pulchellum
Paspalum rupestre
Paspalum secans
Paspalum setaceum
Paspalum urvillei
Paspalum vaginatum
Paspalum virgatum

== Pennisetum ==
Pennisetum ciliare
Pennisetum clandestinum
Pennisetum glaucum
Pennisetum polystachion
Pennisetum purpureum

== Pharus ==
Pharus lappulaceus
Pharus latifolius
Pharus parvifolius

== Phragmites ==
Phragmites australis

== Poa ==
Poa annua
Poa pratensis

== Polypogon ==
Polypogon viridis

== Polytrias ==
Polytrias indica

== Rottboellia ==
Rottboellia cochinchinensis

== Saccharum ==
Saccharum officinarum
Saccharum spontaneum

== Sacciolepis ==
Sacciolepis indica
Sacciolepis striata

== Schizachyrium ==
Schizachyrium brevifolium
Schizachyrium sanguineum
Schizachyrium tenerum

== Setaria ==
Setaria barbata
Setaria chapmanii, syn. Paspalidium chapmanii
Setaria geminata, syn. Paspalidium geminatum
Setaria magna
Setaria parviflora
Setaria pradana
Setaria rariflora
Setaria setosa
Setaria tenacissima
Setaria utowanaea
Setaria vulpiseta

== Sorghastrum ==
Sorghastrum setosum
Sorghastrum stipoides

== Sorghum ==
Sorghum bicolor
Sorghum halepense

== Spartina ==
Spartina patens

== Sporobolus ==
Sporobolus cubensis
Sporobolus domingensis
Sporobolus indicus
Sporobolus pyramidatus
Sporobolus tenuissimus
Sporobolus virginicus

== Stenotaphrum ==
Stenotaphrum secundatum

== Themeda ==
Themeda arguens

== Tragus ==
Tragus berteronianus

== Tripidium ==
Tripidium bengalense

== Tripsacum ==
Tripsacum fasciculatum
Tripsacum latifolium

== Triticum ==
Triticum aestivum

== Urochloa ==
Urochloa adspersa
Urochloa arrecta
Urochloa brizantha
Urochloa decumbens
Urochloa distachya
Urochloa fuscata
Urochloa maxima
Urochloa mosambicensis
Urochloa mutica
Urochloa plantaginea
Urochloa reptans

== Vetiveria ==
Vetiveria zizanioides

== Vulpia ==
Vulpia bromoides

== Zea ==
Zea mays

== Zoysia ==
Zoysia matrella
Zoysia tenuifolia
