= Witchgrass =

Witchgrass may refer to:

- Elymus repens, a species of grass native to most of Europe, Asia, the Arctic biome, and northwest Africa
- Dichanthelium consanguineum, perennial graminoid in the family Poaceae native to the southeast United States.
- Dichanthelium leucothrix, species of perennial graminoid in the family Poaceae found throughout the Americas
- Dichanthelium ravenelii, perennial graminoid in the family Poaceae native to the United States
- Digitaria cognata, species of grass found in North America
- Panicum capillare, a native plant of most of North America
- Panicum hirticaule. species of grass cultivated as a cereal crop in the American Southwest
