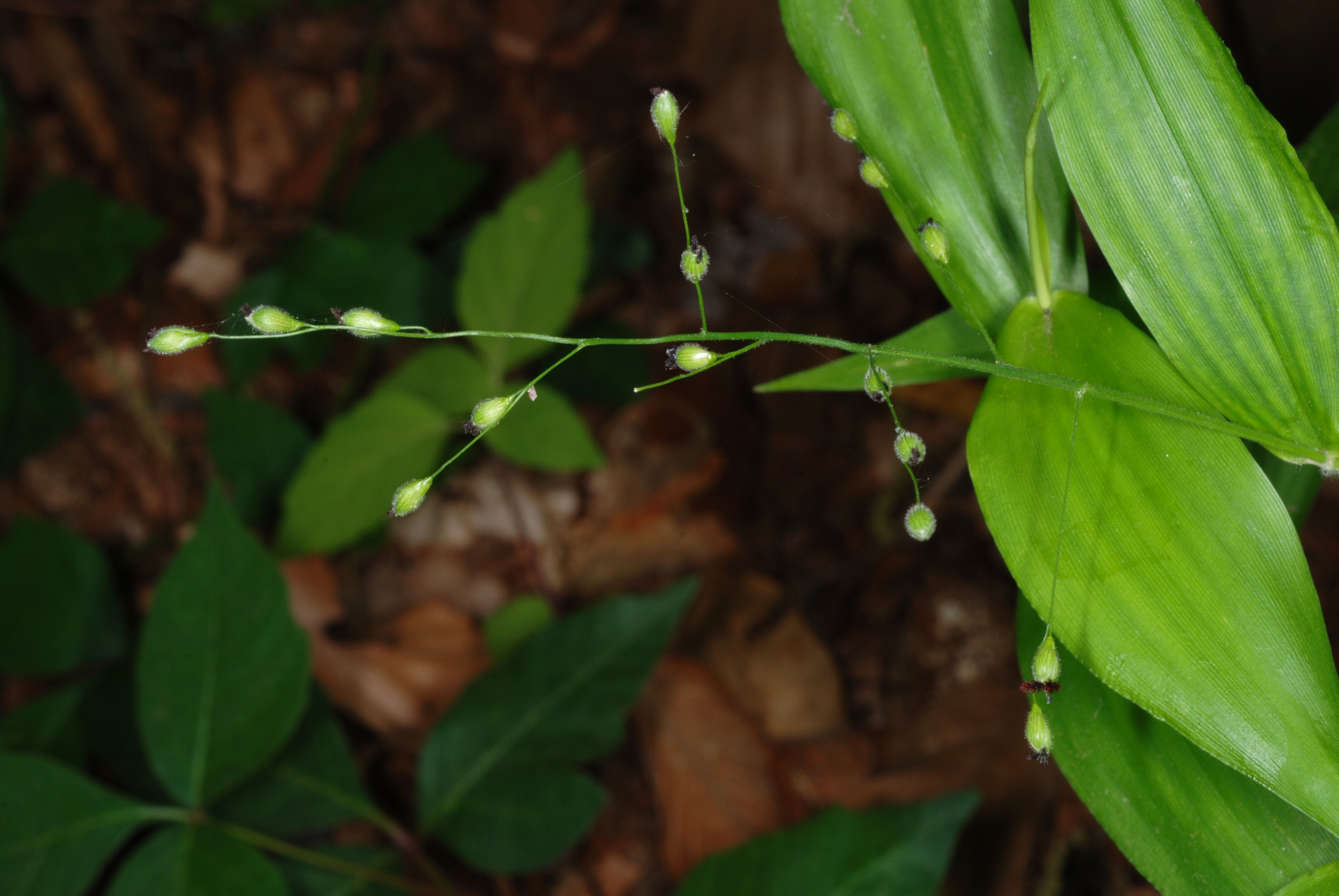

Scientific classification
- Kingdom: Plantae
- Clade: Tracheophytes
- Clade: Angiosperms
- Clade: Monocots
- Clade: Commelinids
- Order: Poales
- Family: Poaceae
- Subfamily: Panicoideae
- Genus: Dichanthelium
- Species: D. boscii

Binomial name
- Dichanthelium boscii (Poir.) Gould & C.A. Clark

= Dichanthelium boscii =

Species of flowering plant

Dichanthelium boscii, commonly known as Bosc's witchgrass, is a perennial graminoid in the family Poaceae found in the eastern United States.

== Description ==
Dichanthelium boscii is a perennial grass with well-defined basal rosettes and occasional branching from nodes above the base. Both basal and cauline leaves are produced in spring and fall. Culms are 20–65 cm tall, with nodes retrorsely bearded and internodes that are glabrous, puberulent, or papillose-pilose. Leaf blades are broad, reaching up to 13 cm long and 12–35 mm wide, and may be glabrous, puberulent, or pilose on both surfaces; margins are ciliate. Ligules are ciliate and 1–1.3 mm long. The panicle is 3–11 cm long and 1–8 cm wide, with a villous rachis and spreading to ascending branches. Spikelets are ellipsoid, 3.7–4.2 mm long, with pedicels ranging from villous to glabrous. The first glume is acute, 1.5–2.2 mm long, and may be glabrous or pubescent. The second glume and sterile lemma are puberulent to short-villous, acute, and equal in length to the spikelet (3.7–4.2 mm). The fertile lemma and palea are also 3.7–4.2 mm long, hardened and without hyaline margins. The grain is broadly ellipsoid to sub-globose, about 2 mm long, and yellowish to purplish at maturity.

== Distribution and habitat ==
Dichanthelium boscii is found from Massachusetts and Illinois south to northern Florida and eastern Texas. It grows in shaded to partially-open, mesic to dry woodlands.
