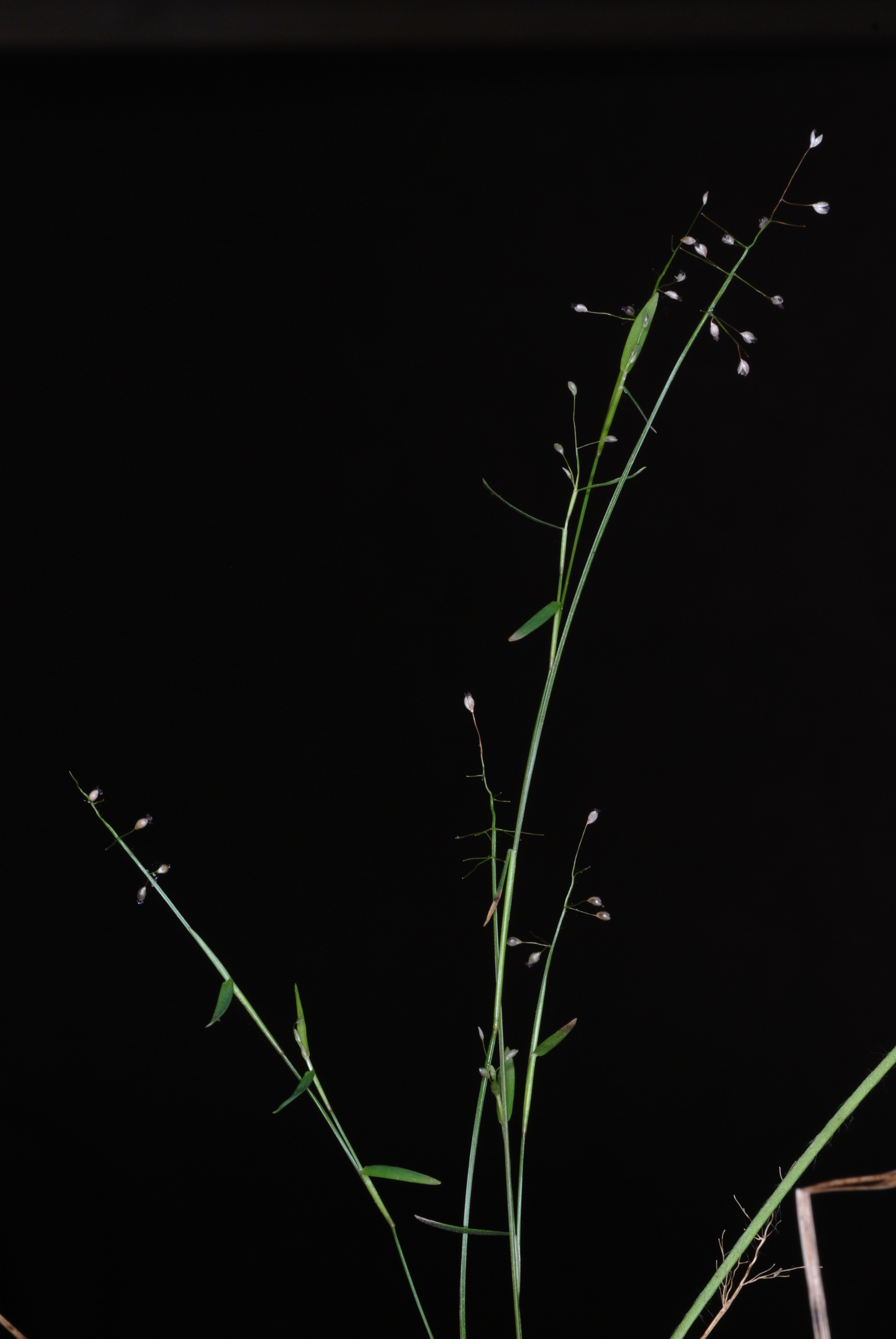

Scientific classification
- Kingdom: Plantae
- Clade: Tracheophytes
- Clade: Angiosperms
- Clade: Monocots
- Clade: Commelinids
- Order: Poales
- Family: Poaceae
- Subfamily: Panicoideae
- Genus: Dichanthelium
- Species: D. ensifolium

Binomial name
- Dichanthelium ensifolium (Baldwin ex Elliott) Gould

= Dichanthelium ensifolium =

Species of plant

Dichanthelium ensifolium, the small-leaved witchgrass, is a perennial graminoid native to the Atlantic Coastal Plain of the United States

== Description ==
Species in the Dichanthelium genus typically have spikelets arranged in panicles. The spikelets are generally round or nearly round in cross-section and are two-flowered: the terminal floret is fertile, while the basal one is either sterile, neutral, or staminate. The first glume is usually present, and the second glume resembles the sterile lemma. The fertile lemma and palea are hardened and lack hyaline margins. Specifically, D. ensifolium is very similar to D. tenue. It is a perennial species that forms distinct basal rosettes. When branching occurs, it originates from nodes above the basal rosette. Leaves are both basal and cauline, appearing in spring (vernal) and autumn. Unlike D. tenue, the blade margins of D. ensifolium are not strongly cartilaginous, and the leaf bases are often ciliate. The spikelets are either glabrous or slightly hairy and measure 1.3–1.6 mm in length.

== Distribution and habitat ==
D. ensifolium is distributed from New Jersey south to Florida and west to eastern Texas and Arkansas. It grows in wet to mesic sandy, peaty, or mucky soils, often in open pinelands or with Sphagnum.
