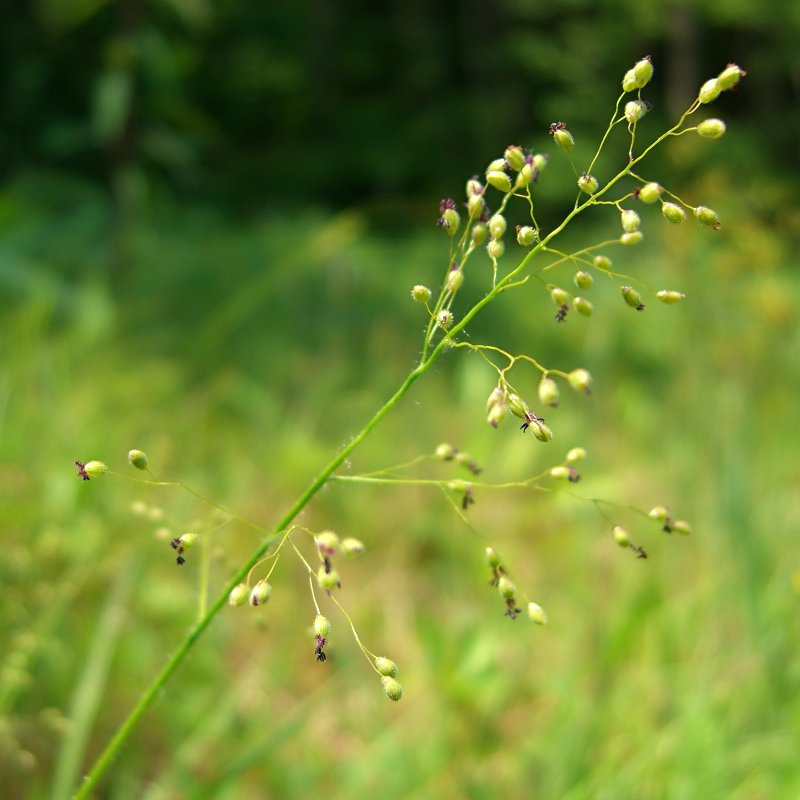

Scientific classification
- Kingdom: Plantae
- Clade: Tracheophytes
- Clade: Angiosperms
- Clade: Monocots
- Clade: Commelinids
- Order: Poales
- Family: Poaceae
- Subfamily: Panicoideae
- Genus: Dichanthelium
- Species: D. laxiflorum

Binomial name
- Dichanthelium laxiflorum (Lam.) Gould

= Dichanthelium laxiflorum =

Species of plant

Dichanthelium laxiflorum, commonly known as open-flower witchgrass, is a perennial graminoid in the family Poaceae that is found throughout the Americas.

== Description ==
Dichanthelium laxiflorum is a tufted perennial grass with culms 15–45 cm tall, featuring usually bearded nodes and glabrous to slightly roughened internodes. Leaves are primarily located on the lower stem, with blades up to 16 cm long and 4–15 mm wide, generally glabrous or rough-textured, and sometimes bearing appressed to spreading soft hairs. Ligules are ciliate and measure 0.5–1 mm long. The vernal panicle is 4–9 cm long and 3–6 cm wide, with smooth or nearly smooth pedicels ranging from 1–10 mm in length. Spikelets are ellipsoid, 1.6–2.3 mm long. The first glume is scarious, acute, nerveless or 1-nerved, and 1.6–2.3 mm long. The sterile palea is also scarious and measures 1.2–1.6 mm. Fertile lemmas and paleas are hardened, usually nerveless or faintly nerved, lustrous, yellowish to brownish, and 1.5–2 mm long. Grains are broadly ellipsoid, 1–1.5 mm long, and whitish to yellowish.

== Distribution and habitat ==
In the United States, D. laxiflorum is found from Maryland south to Florida west to Texas and north to Indiana. It is also found in Mexico, Central America, and the West Indies. It grows in open or shaded woodlands, often in moist soil.
