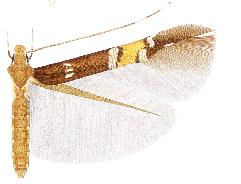

Scientific classification
- Kingdom: Animalia
- Phylum: Arthropoda
- Class: Insecta
- Order: Lepidoptera
- Family: Cosmopterigidae
- Genus: Cosmopterix
- Species: C. clandestinella

Binomial name
- Cosmopterix clandestinella Busck, 1906

= Cosmopterix clandestinella =

Species of moth

Cosmopterix clandestinella is a moth of the family Cosmopterigidae. It is known from the United States (from Massachusetts and southern Ohio south to Virginia and North Carolina. It has also been recorded from Michigan).

== Description ==
=== Adult ===
Male, female. Forewing length 3.2-3.7mm. Head: frons shining ochreous-white with greenish and purplish reflections, vertex and neck tufts shining pale bronze brown with greenish and reddish reflections, laterally lined white, collar shining pale bronze brown with greenish and reddish reflections; labial palpus first segment very short, white, second segment three-quarters of the length of third, dorsally brown, ventrally white, third segment dorsally white, ventrally brown, extreme apex brown; scape dorsally bronze brown with a white anterior line, ventrally white, antenna shining brown with an interrupted white line from base to beyond one-half with a short uninterrupted section distally, followed towards apex by six brown segments, six white, eight brown, six white and one brownish segment at apex. Thorax and tegulae shining pale bronze brown with greenish and purplish gloss. Legs: shining dark greyish brown, tibia of midleg ochreous-grey, foreleg with a white line on tibia and tarsal segments, tibia of midleg with silver metallic oblique basal and medial streaks and a white apical ring, tarsal segments one, two and four with white apical rings, segment five missing, hindlegs missing, spurs dark greyish brown, ventrally white. Forewing shining dark brown with reddish gloss, at one-fifth three short silver metallic streaks of equal length with bluish reflection, a subcostal and a medial just above fold, and a slightly wider subdorsal just below fold, beyond one-half a shining dark yellow transverse fascia, narrowing towards dorsum, bordered on the inner edge by a slightly inwardly oblique tubercular silver metallic fascia with greenish and purplish reflections, bordered at the outer edge by similarly coloured costal and dorsal spots, the dorsal spot three times the size of the costal and more towards base, the fascia outwardly and the costal and dorsal spot broadly edged dark brown inwardly, the costal spot outwardly edged by a narrow white costal streak, apical line as a silver metallic spot with bluish reflection in the middle of the apical area and a broad white streak in the cilia at apex, cilia dark brown, paler on dorsum towards base. Hindwing shining dark greyish brown, cilia greyish brown. Underside: forewing shining brown with the white costal and apical streak distinctly visible, hindwing shining greyish brown. Abdomen dorsally shining brown with some greenish gloss, laterally and ventrally shining dark greyish brown with greenish reflection, segments broadly banded shining white posteriorly, anal tuft shining greyish brown.

=== Larva ===
Body light green with short light hairs, at maturity with three brilliant wine-red longitudinal stripes, head and prothoracic plate yellow.

== Biology ==
The larvae feed on Dichanthelium clandestinum. They mine the leaves of their host plant. The mine is an irregular longitudinal blotch mine with the frass ejected at one end. At maturity the larva cuts a circular piece out of the epidermis of its mine, which it bends lengthwise and uses for a cocoon exactly like the genus Cycloplasis. There are two generations, the adults have emerged from late May to early June and again in late July and August. The specimens from Michigan are obviously from the second generation, the mines were collected in August and the adults emerged in May.
