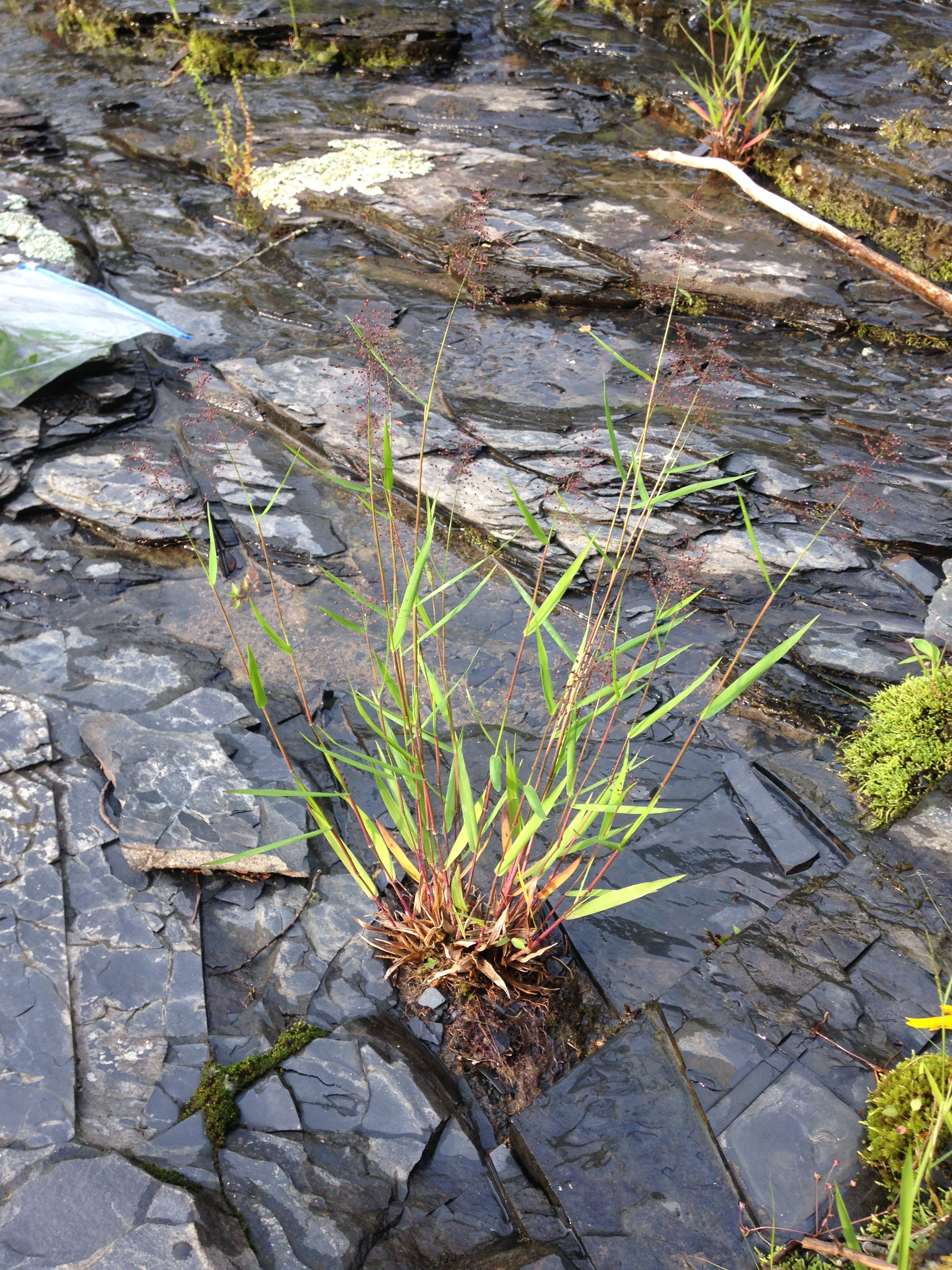

Scientific classification
- Kingdom: Plantae
- Clade: Tracheophytes
- Clade: Angiosperms
- Clade: Monocots
- Clade: Commelinids
- Order: Poales
- Family: Poaceae
- Subfamily: Panicoideae
- Genus: Dichanthelium
- Species: D. lindheimeri

Binomial name
- Dichanthelium lindheimeri (Nash) Gould

Synonyms
- Dichanthelium acuminatum var. lindheimeri; Panicum lindheimeri

= Dichanthelium lindheimeri =

Species of grass

Dichanthelium lindheimeri, commonly called Lindheimer panicgrass, is a species of flowering plant in the grass family (Poaceae). It is native primarily to eastern areas the United States and Canada, with its range extending into the South Central region. There are also outlying western populations in California, New Mexico and Oregon.

It is most commonly associated with sandy, ephemerally wet soils. Typical habitats include prairies, glades, streambanks, floodplains, and lake shores.

Dichanthelium lindheimeri is a perennial grass that fruits from May to November. It superficially resembles the closely related Dichanthelium lanuginosum, but differs in a number of characters: D. lindheimeri has nearly-hairless sheathes and leaf surfaces, crooked marginal leaf cilia, and a shorter ligule. In addition, it is typically found in wetter habitats compared to the more dry-mesic D. lanuginosum.

Some authors choose to treat Dichanthelium lindheimeri and many other closely taxa as varieties of an expanded, highly polymorphic Dichanthelium acuminatum complex.
