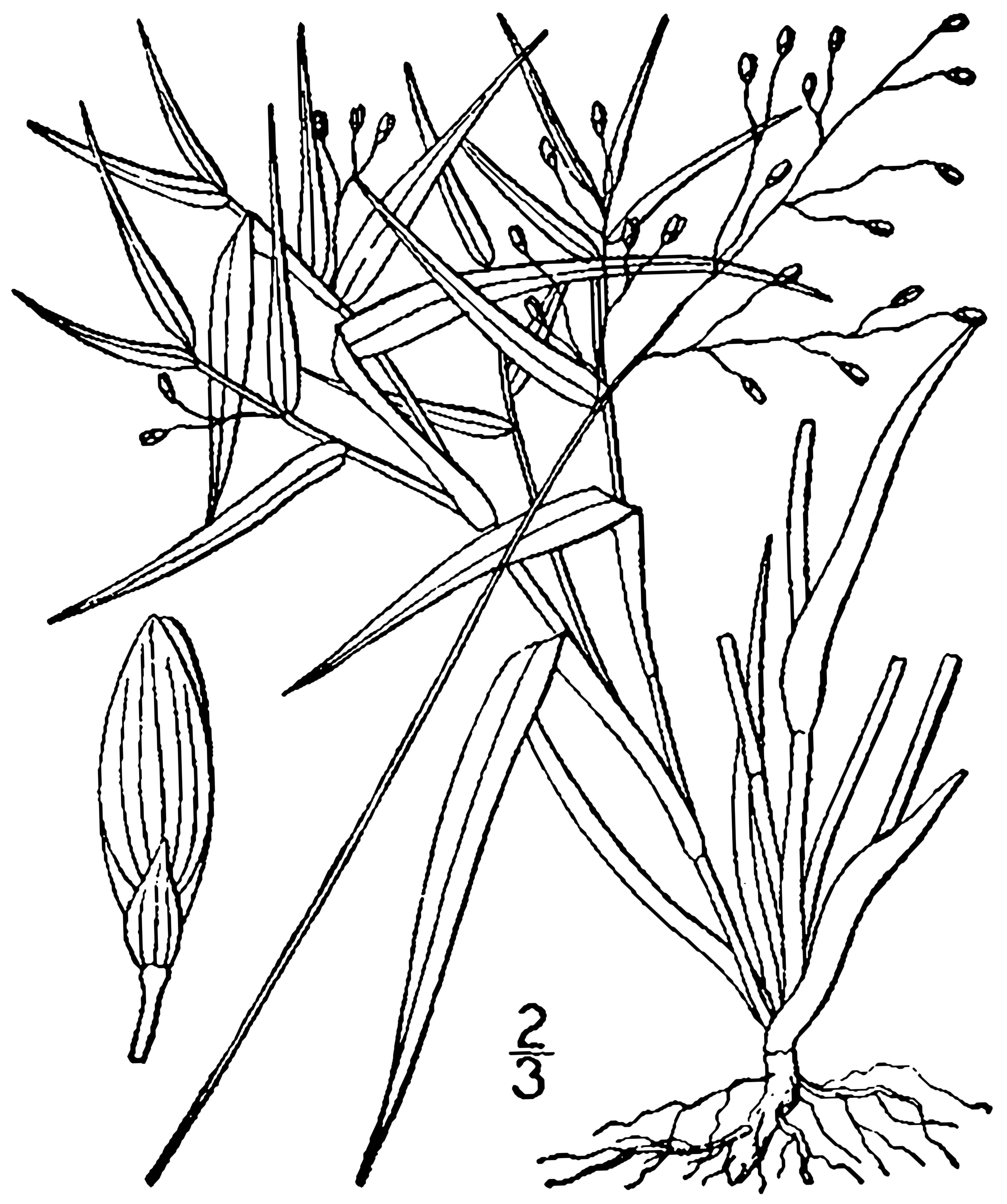
- var. dichotomum

Scientific classification
- Kingdom: Plantae
- Clade: Tracheophytes
- Clade: Angiosperms
- Clade: Monocots
- Clade: Commelinids
- Order: Poales
- Family: Poaceae
- Subfamily: Panicoideae
- Genus: Dichanthelium
- Species: D. dichotomum

Binomial name
- Dichanthelium dichotomum (L.) Gould

= Dichanthelium dichotomum =

Species of graminoid

Dichanthelium dichotomum is a species of perennial graminoid in the family Poaceae that is found throughout the Americas.

== Description ==
Dichanthelium dichotomum has distinct basal rosettes and occasional branching from nodes above the base. Culms range from 20 to 110 cm tall and vary from weak to stout, with nodes that are either densely bearded with backward-facing hairs or smooth, and glabrous internodes. Leaves occur both at the base and along the stem, with blades up to 12 cm long and 3–12 mm wide that may be softly hairy, shaggy, or smooth on both surfaces; margins are typically rough and sometimes fringed with hairs. Sheaths range from glabrous to pilose or villous, and ligules are ciliate, sometimes reduced or absent. The panicle is 3–12 cm long and 2–8 cm wide, with spreading to ascending branches that are smooth or slightly roughened. Spikelets are 2-flowered and broadly ellipsoid, with the first glume glabrous and 0.5–0.8 mm long. The second glume and sterile lemma are 1.4–2.4 mm long, glabrous or softly hairy, and obtuse. Fertile lemmas and paleas are hardened, 1.4–2.4 mm long, and lack hyaline margins. The grain is broadly ellipsoid to nearly round, yellowish to purplish, and 1–1.2 mm long.

== Distribution and habitat ==
The variety D. dichotomum var. dichotomum is found from southern Canada and Michigan south to Florida and Texas. It grows in wet-mesic to dry woods, thickets, and woodland openings. Another variety, D. dichotomum var. nitidum (Lam.) is found from Pennsylvania and New Jersey south to Florida and west to Missouri and Texas. It is also found in The Bahamas, West Indies, and from Mexico south to Venezuela. This variety grows in moist sandy or peaty soil of wet pine savannas and pocosin ecotones, as well as marshes, swamps, and wet meadows near the coast. It is fire tolerant.
