= Dichanthelium ravenelii =

Scientific classification
- Kingdom: Plantae
- Clade: Tracheophytes
- Clade: Angiosperms
- Clade: Monocots
- Clade: Commelinids
- Order: Poales
- Family: Poaceae
- Subfamily: Panicoideae
- Genus: Dichanthelium
- Species: D. ravenelii

Binomial name
- Dichanthelium ravenelii (Scribn. & Merr.) Gould

Species of plant

Dichanthelium ravenelii, commonly known as Ravenel's witchgrass, is a perennial graminoid in the family Poaceae native to the United States.

== Description ==
Dichanthelium ravenelii is characterized by prominent basal leaf rosettes and occasional branching from nodes above the base. It produces both spring and fall foliage, with stems reaching 25–60 cm in height. The nodes are densely bearded, and the stem internodes are finely hairy or slightly rough. Leaf blades are up to 12 cm long and 2.5–19 mm wide, glabrous above and softly hairy below, with scabrous, ciliate margins and heart-shaped, hairy bases. Sheaths are covered with soft hairs, ligules are densely ciliate and 3–5 mm long, and the collars are also densely pubescent. The inflorescence is a broad panicle (6–7 cm long, 5–6 cm wide) with short-hairy branches and rachis. Spikelets are obovoid to broadly ellipsoid and measure 3.8–4.2 mm long, with hairy glumes and lemmas. The fertile floret is smooth, yellowish to brownish when mature, and either nerveless or faintly nerved. Grains are broadly ellipsoid to nearly round, 1.2–2 mm long, and yellowish or purplish.

== Distribution and habitat ==
Dichanthelium ravenelii is found from New Jersey south to Florida, west to eastern Texas, and north to Iowa. It grows in dry sandy or rocky thin woods and openings and sometimes in moist soils.
