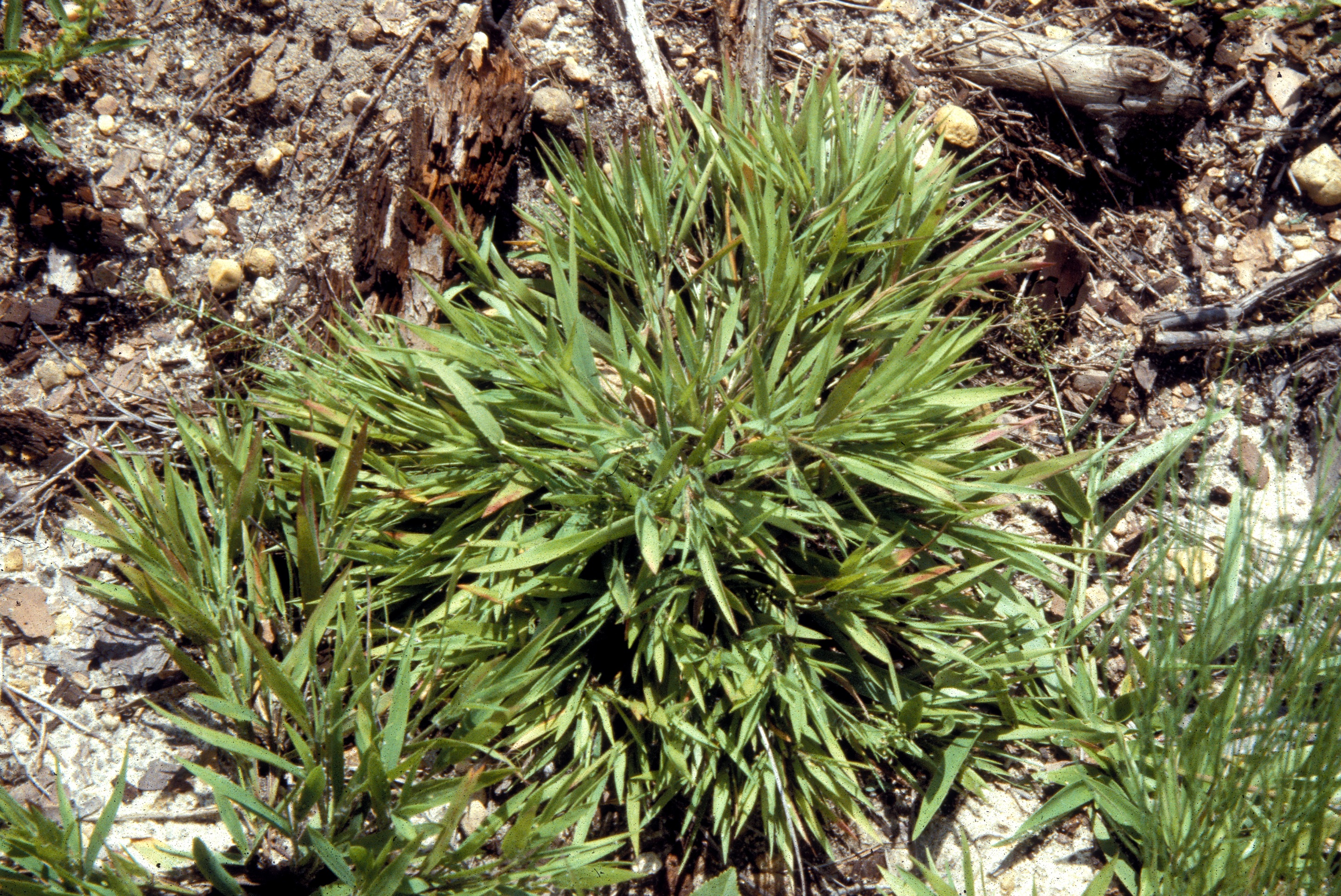

Scientific classification
- Kingdom: Plantae
- Clade: Tracheophytes
- Clade: Angiosperms
- Clade: Monocots
- Clade: Commelinids
- Order: Poales
- Family: Poaceae
- Subfamily: Panicoideae
- Genus: Dichanthelium
- Species: D. aciculare

Binomial name
- Dichanthelium aciculare (Desv. ex Poir.) Gould & C.A. Clark

= Dichanthelium aciculare =

Species of grass

Dichanthelium aciculare, commonly known as needleleaf witchgrass, is a perennial graminoid in the family Poaceae found throughout the Americas.

== Description ==
Dichanthelium aciculare is a perennial grass forming distinct basal rosettes, with occasional branching from nodes above the base. Both basal and stem (cauline) leaves are produced during spring and fall. Culms are 15–60 cm tall, with bearded nodes and long-pilose internodes. Leaf blades reach up to 8 cm in length; lower blades are 1–6 mm wide, while the uppermost are less than 2 mm wide, and may be glabrous or pilose on both surfaces, with glabrous margins and often long cilia at the base. Sheaths are pilose or puberulent; ligules are ciliate and 1–3 mm long. In the fall, blades become narrow and involute (0.5–2 mm wide), and may be glabrous to sparsely pilose. Panicles are exserted, 2–7 cm long and 1–5 cm wide, with a glabrous or puberulent rachis and spreading-ascending branches that are scaberulous and occasionally pilose at the base. Spikelets are obovoid, 1.5–2 mm long, borne on scaberulous pedicels. The first glume is glabrous, scarious, acute, and 0.6–0.8 mm long. The second glume and sterile lemma are pubescent or puberulent, obtuse, and 1.6–2 mm long. The fertile lemma and palea are 1.5–1.8 mm long, nerveless or faintly nerved, yellowish to brownish at maturity, lustrous, and acute or obtuse. Grains are broadly ellipsoid to subglobose, yellowish or purplish, and about 1 mm long.

== Distribution and habitat ==
In the United States, D. aciculare is found from New Jersey south to northern Florida, west to Texas, Oklahoma, and Mexico. It is also found in the West Indies and northern South America. It grows in sandy woods and fields.
