= Dichanthelium consanguineum =

Scientific classification
- Kingdom: Plantae
- Clade: Tracheophytes
- Clade: Angiosperms
- Clade: Monocots
- Clade: Commelinids
- Order: Poales
- Family: Poaceae
- Subfamily: Panicoideae
- Genus: Dichanthelium
- Species: D. consanguineum

Binomial name
- Dichanthelium consanguineum (Kunth) Gould & Carolyn A. Clark

Perennial graminoid

Dichanthelium consanguineum, commonly known as Kunth's witchgrass, is a perennial graminoid in the family Poaceae native to the southeast United States.

== Description ==
Dichanthelium consanguineum forms distinct basal rosettes and may branch from nodes above the base. Culms grow 30–50 cm tall and have villous nodes and internodes. Leaves are both basal and cauline, produced in spring and fall. Blades reach up to 12 cm long and 2–10 mm wide, with upper blades typically over 2 mm wide. They are glabrous or densely papillose-pilose on both surfaces, with margins often papillose-ciliate. Sheaths are glabrous to papillose-pilose and may be appressed or spreading. Ligules are ciliate and measure 1–5 mm long. Autumnal blades are usually flat, 2–4.5 mm wide, and up to 8 cm long. The inflorescence is a narrow panicle 1.5–7 cm long and 1–4.5 cm wide, with a glabrous or slightly puberulent rachis and spreading to ascending branches that are scaberulous (slightly rough). Spikelets are obovoid, 2.2–2.8 mm long, and borne on scaberulous pedicels. The first glume is scarious, obtuse, and 0.6–1 mm long. The second glume and sterile lemma are pubescent, acute to obtuse, and about 2.5 mm long. Fertile lemmas and paleas are firm (indurate) and measure 2–2.2 mm in length. The grain is yellowish or purplish, broadly ellipsoid to nearly round, and about 1.5 mm long.

== Distribution and habitat ==
Dichanthelium consanguineum is found from southeastern Virginia south to Florida and west to Texas and Indiana. It grows on moist or dry sandy soils of pinelands.
