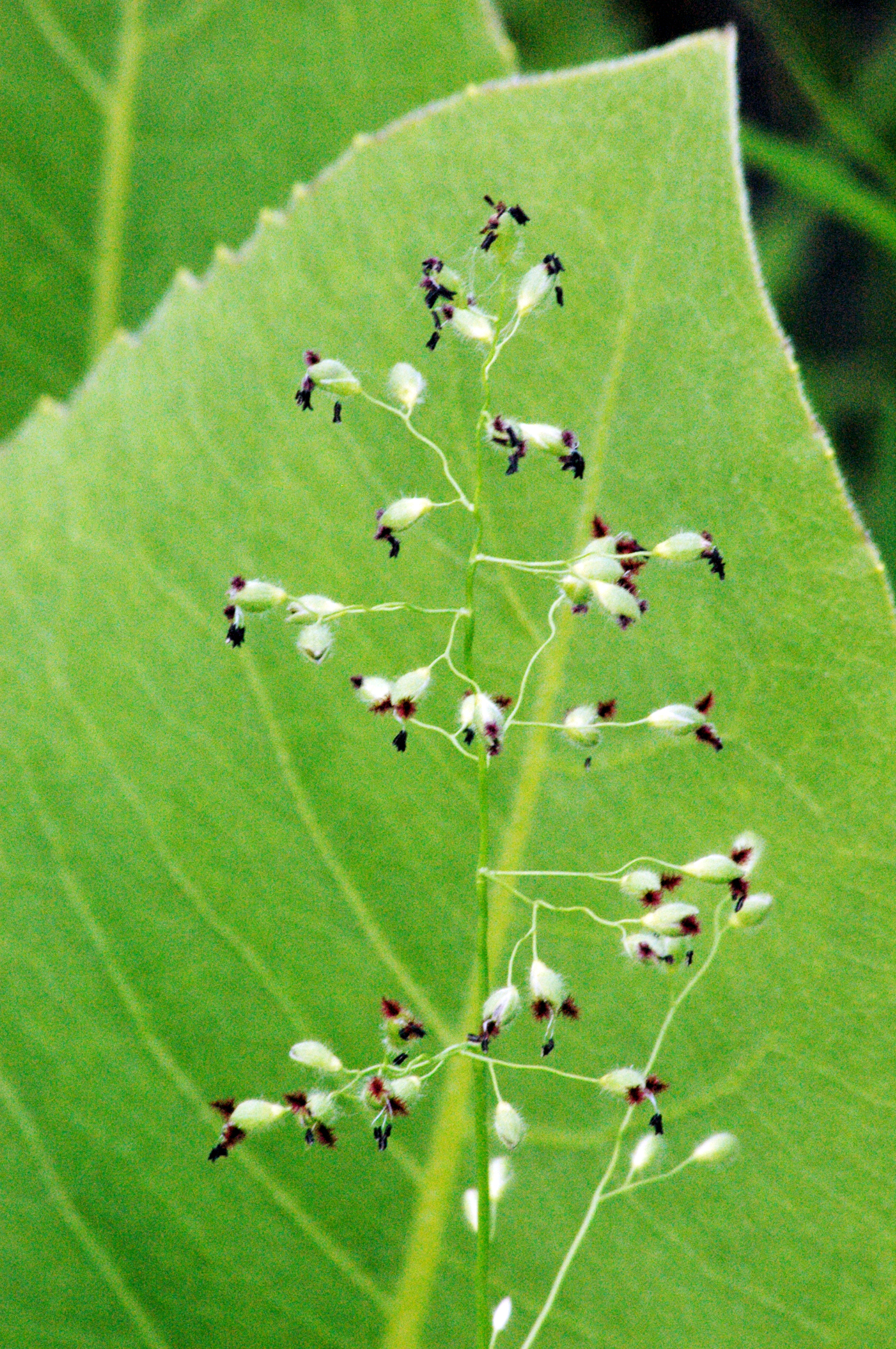

Conservation status
- Apparently Secure (NatureServe)

Scientific classification
- Kingdom: Plantae
- Clade: Tracheophytes
- Clade: Angiosperms
- Clade: Monocots
- Clade: Commelinids
- Order: Poales
- Family: Poaceae
- Subfamily: Panicoideae
- Genus: Dichanthelium
- Species: D. leibergii

Binomial name
- Dichanthelium leibergii (Vasey) Freckmann

= Dichanthelium leibergii =

Species of grass

Dichanthelium leibergii, known as variously as Leiberg's panicum, Leiberg's panicgrass, Leiberg's rosette grass, and prairie panic grass is a species of grass native to North America. It was named after John Bernhard Leiberg (1853-1913), a Swedish-born American botanist active in the western United States who described the species in 1889.

== Description ==
Leiberg's panicgrass is a small perennial grass forming loose rosettes with culms between 30–60 centimeters (12–24 in) in height. It is distinguished from other similar species of Dichanthelium by a combination of the following characters:

- leave less than 15 millimeters (0.59 in) wide and less than 15-20 times as long as wide;
- leaves hairy;
- stem slender with narrowly ovoid panicle;
- spikelets with long, soft hairs up to 1 millimeter (1/32 in) in length;
- first glume narrowly ovate, reaching the middle of the spikelet.

== Distribution ==
Dichanthelium leibergii ranges north to Alberta, west to Kansas, and east to New York state. Although it is "fairly common" in Manitoba and it was formerly a dominant species in mesic to dry tallgrass prairies in Iowa, Wisconsin, and Minnesota, it is now a rare species across much of its range. In most surviving prairies and oak savannas, it has decreased in abundance, likely because of fire exclusion and late-spring fire, which favor big bluestem and indiangrass because of their long rhizomes that let them emerge through litter and the belowground buds along their rhizomes that permit them to resprout when their culms or rhizome tips are damaged by fire. It is state threatened in Indiana, Michigan, and Ohio and state endangered in New York. It is extirpated in Pennsylvania.

== Ecology ==
In the Chicago region, it is a highly conservative species, with a coefficient of conservatism of 10. It occurs in high-quality prairie remnants, including wet prairie, mesic prairie, gravel hill prairie, as well as dry-mesic black oak savannas and oak openings. In a North Dakota study, its coverage increased significantly following the application of prescribed burning.

== Conservation ==
Leiberg's panicgrass is threatened by habitat fragmentation, destruction, and invasive species. Appropriate management to maintain and increase populations of Leiberg's panicgrass includes removal of woody and invasive plant populations, prescribed burning, and prairie restoration.
