= Dichanthelium hirstii =

Conservation status
- Critically Imperiled (NatureServe)

Scientific classification
- Kingdom: Plantae
- Clade: Tracheophytes
- Clade: Angiosperms
- Clade: Monocots
- Clade: Commelinids
- Order: Poales
- Family: Poaceae
- Subfamily: Panicoideae
- Genus: Dichanthelium
- Species: D. hirstii

Binomial name
- Dichanthelium hirstii (Swallen) Kartesz

Synonyms
- Panicum hirstii

Species of grass

Dichanthelium hirstii is a species of grass known by the common name Hirst's panic grass. It is native to the eastern United States, where it is extant in Delaware, New Jersey, and North Carolina. It is extirpated in Georgia.

This grass produces small tufts or large clumps of stems which can be up to a meter tall in some areas. The inflorescence is a panicle of small spikelets that grow pressed against the stem.

This grass grows in ponds in the Pine Barrens on the coastal plain of New Jersey and on coastal grasslands in North Carolina. When it occurred in Georgia it grew in cypress swamps. It is a plant of seasonally wet habitat and population numbers vary from year to year.
