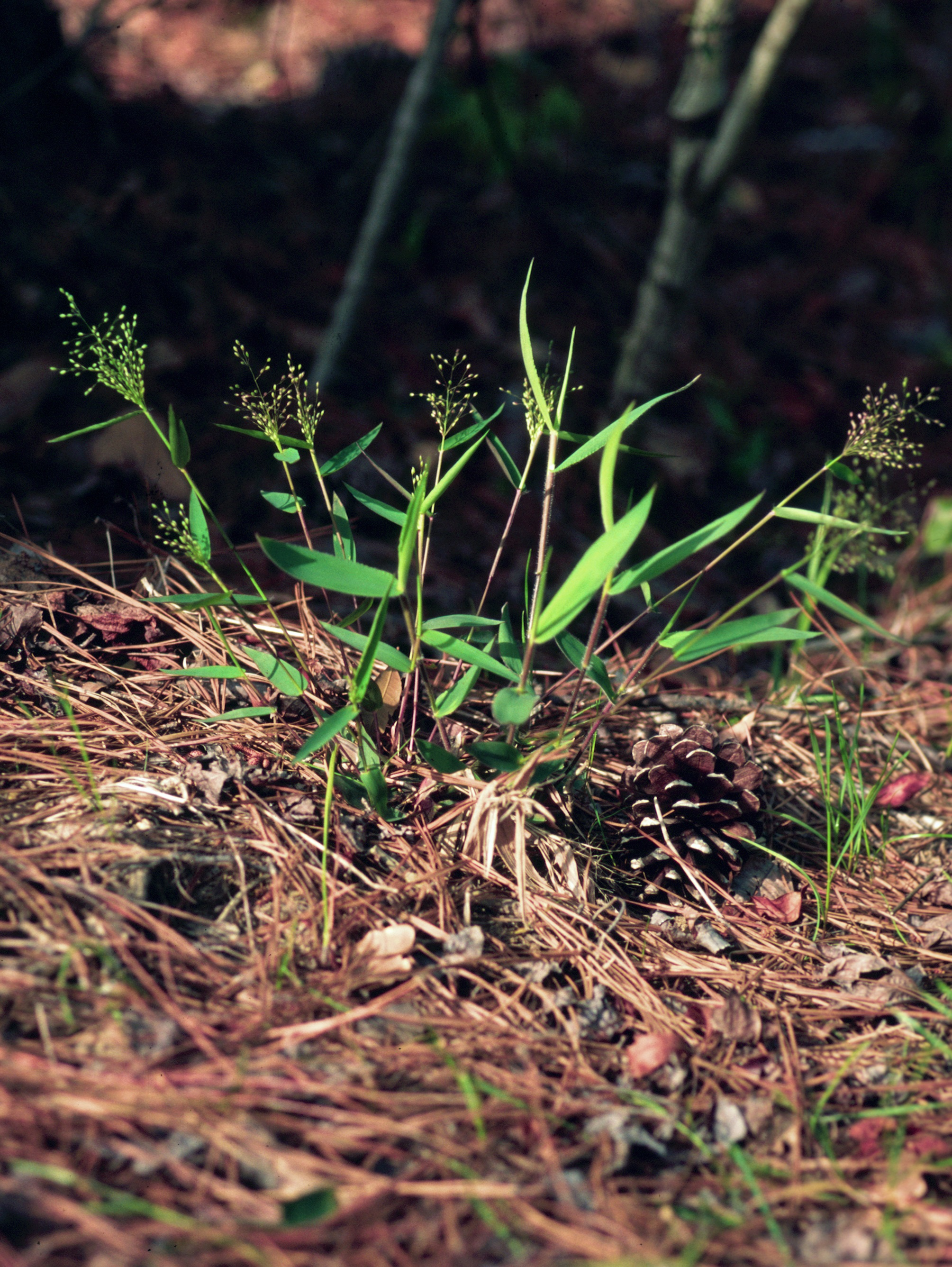

Conservation status
- Secure (NatureServe)

Scientific classification
- Kingdom: Plantae
- Clade: Tracheophytes
- Clade: Angiosperms
- Clade: Monocots
- Clade: Commelinids
- Order: Poales
- Family: Poaceae
- Subfamily: Panicoideae
- Genus: Dichanthelium
- Species: D. commutatum

Binomial name
- Dichanthelium commutatum (Schult.) Gould

= Dichanthelium commutatum =

Species of flowering plant

Dichanthelium commutatum (known commonly as variable panicgrass or variable witchgrass) is a species of perennial graminoid native to North America. D. communtatums range encompasses the eastern United States, stretching from Maine to Florida and westward to Texas. It is endangered in the state of Illinois.

This species has two recognized variations: D. commutatum var. ashei and D. commutatum var. commutatum. D. commutatum var. commutatum can be found in habitats such as moist woodlands, while D. commutatum var. ashei is most often observed in dry, rocky woods. Both variations have a medium tolerance for both shade and drought. The species is considered to be an indicator species for the shortleaf pine-oak-hickory woodland habitat type found in the Red Hills region of the southeastern United States, as well as for the longleaf pine woodlands community type found in northern Florida.

D. communtatum generally flowers from May to October.
