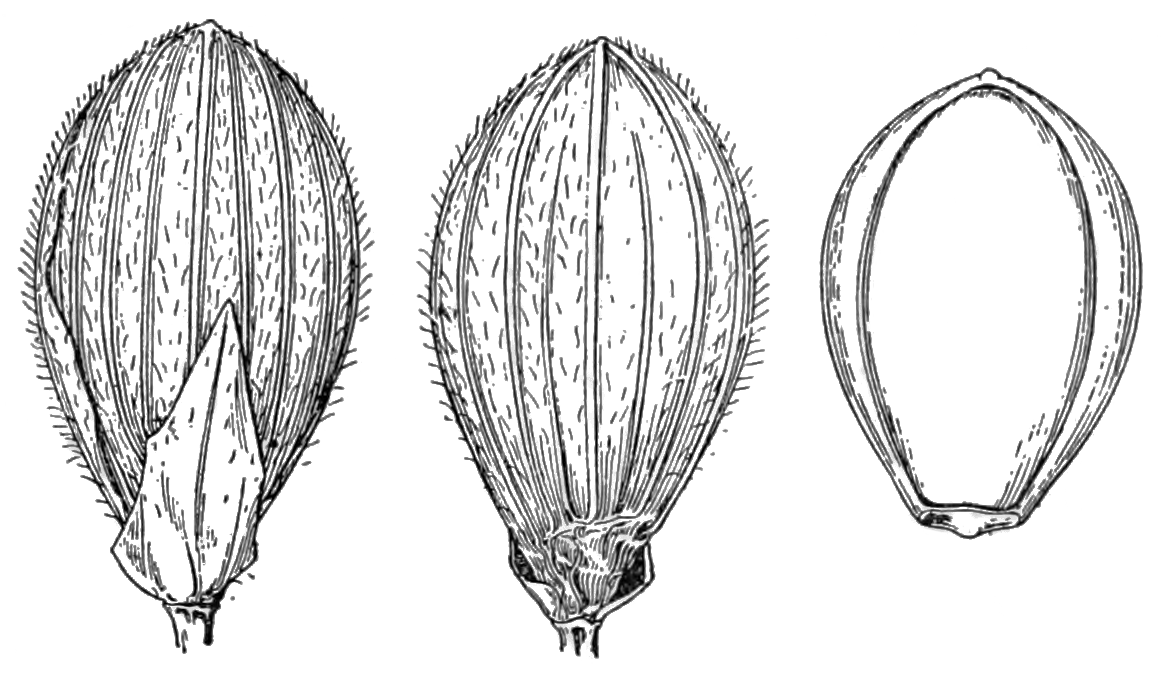
- 1935 illustration

Scientific classification
- Kingdom: Plantae
- Clade: Tracheophytes
- Clade: Angiosperms
- Clade: Monocots
- Clade: Commelinids
- Order: Poales
- Family: Poaceae
- Subfamily: Panicoideae
- Genus: Dichanthelium
- Species: D. xanthophysum

Binomial name
- Dichanthelium xanthophysum (A.Gray) Freckmann

Synonyms
- Panicum xanthophysum

= Dichanthelium xanthophysum =

Species of flowering plant

Dichanthelium xanthophysum, formerly known as Panicum xanthophysum, common names slender rosette grass, panic grass and slender panic-grass, is a plant found in North America. It is listed as a special concern and believed extirpated in Connecticut. It is listed as endangered in New Jersey and Pennsylvania.
