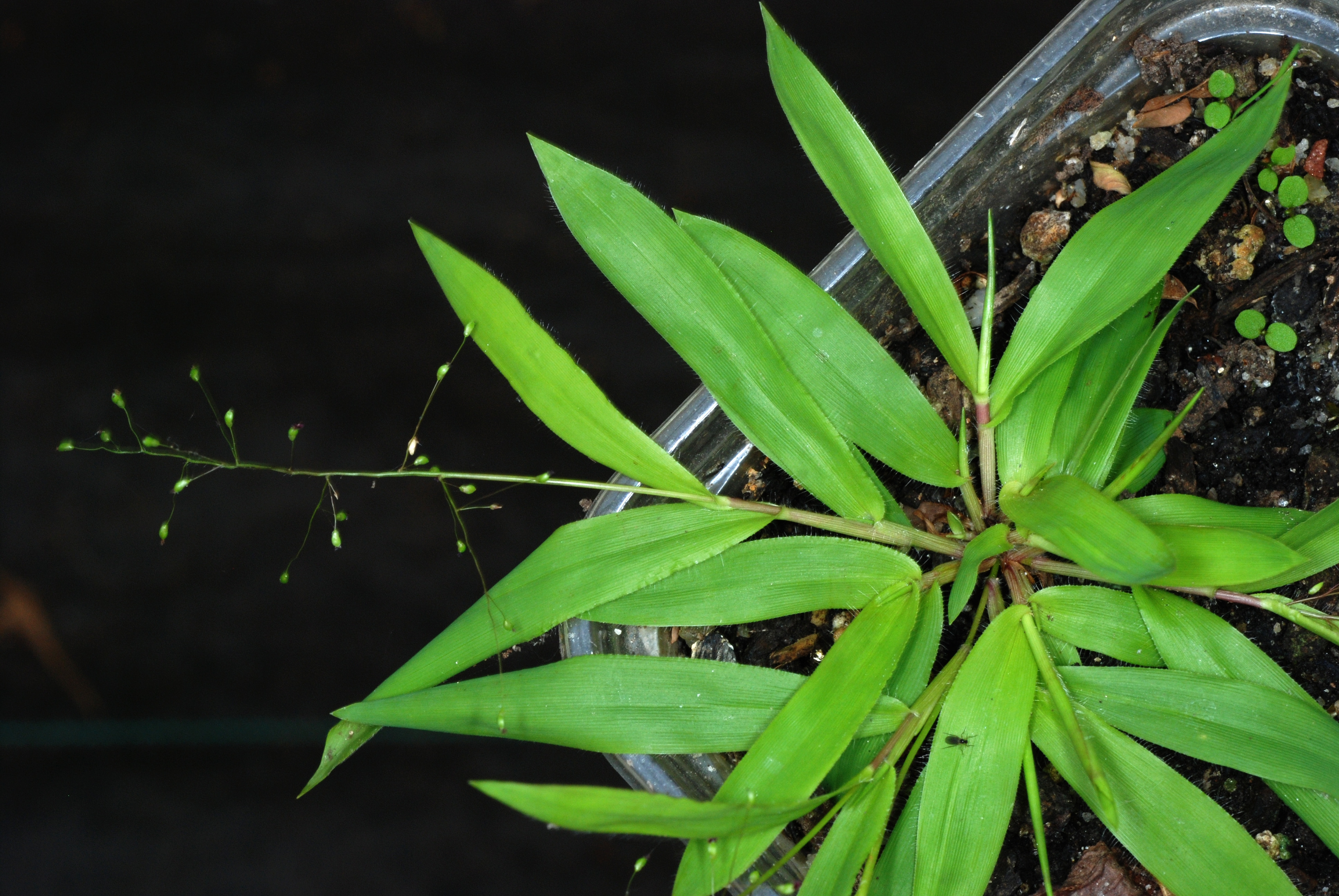

Scientific classification
- Kingdom: Plantae
- Clade: Tracheophytes
- Clade: Angiosperms
- Clade: Monocots
- Clade: Commelinids
- Order: Poales
- Family: Poaceae
- Subfamily: Panicoideae
- Genus: Dichanthelium
- Species: D. strigosum

Binomial name
- Dichanthelium strigosum (Muhl. ex. Elliott) Freckmann

= Dichanthelium strigosum =

Species of plant

Dichanthelium strigosum is a perennial graminoid in the family Poaceae found in the Americas.

There are three varieties: D. strigosum var. glabrescens Griseb., D. strigosum var. leucoblepharis (Trin.) Freckmann, D. strigosum var. strigosum.

== Description ==
Dichanthelium strigosum is distinguished by its basal leaf rosettes and occasional branching from nodes above the rosette. It produces both spring and fall leaves, with stems 10–50 cm tall featuring long, soft hairs on the internodes and bearded nodes. The leaf blades are 2–6 mm wide and up to 6 cm long, softly hairy on both surfaces with long ciliate margins; sheaths range from hairy to nearly smooth, and ligules are ciliate and 1–2.5 mm long. The panicle is 5–7 cm long and 3–5.5 cm wide, with softly hairy, spreading branches. Spikelets are obovoid to broadly ellipsoid (1.2–1.6 mm), typically smooth, and two-flowered, with a sterile lower floret and a fertile upper one. The glumes and sterile lemma are glabrous and acute, while the hardened fertile lemma and palea lack hyaline margins. Grains are 0.8–1 mm long, broadly ellipsoid to nearly round, and yellowish to purplish.

== Distribution and habitat ==
Dichantelium strigosum var. glabrescens is found in the southeast United States, in Georgia and Florida west to Louisiana, with disjunct populations in southeast North Carolina and northeast and southeast South Carolina. It is also found in the West Indies and Belize, and grows in bogs, low, open sandy pinelands and hammocks, and wet pine savannas and flatwoods.

Dichanthelium strigosum var. leucoblepharis is found from North Carolina south to northern Florida and west to Texas, as well as in Mexico. it grows in sandy, acidic soils of pinelands.

Dichanthelium strigosum var. strigosum is found from southeast Virginia south to Florida, west to Texas. It is also found in eastern Mexico, Mesoamerica, northern South America, and the West Indies. It grows in moist soils of pine flatwoods, savannas, and pocosins.
