= Eragrostis tracyi =

Scientific classification
- Kingdom: Plantae
- Clade: Tracheophytes
- Clade: Angiosperms
- Clade: Monocots
- Clade: Commelinids
- Order: Poales
- Family: Poaceae
- Subfamily: Chloridoideae
- Genus: Eragrostis
- Species: E. tracyi

Binomial name
- Eragrostis tracyi Hitchc.

Species of grass

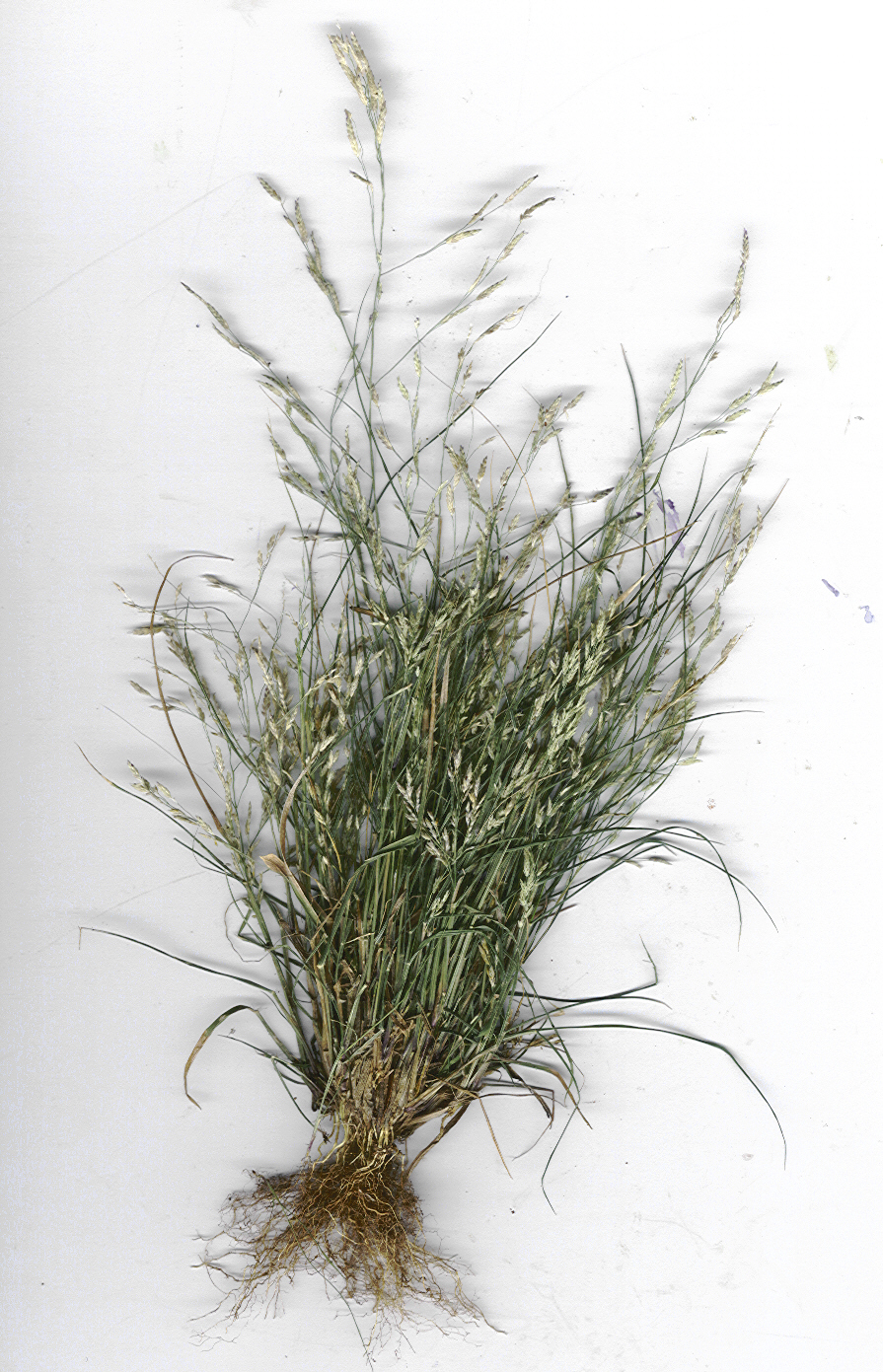
Eragrostis pectinacea

Eragrostis tracyi is a species of flowering plant in the family Poaceae, native to Florida in the United States. It was first described by Albert Hitchcock in 1934. It has also been treated as a variety of Eragrostis pectinacea under the name E. pectinacea var. tracyi.
