= S.M. Tracy Herbarium =

- Established: Early 1930s (based on collections donated in 1917)
- Location: College Station, Texas, U.S.
- Type: Herbarium (research collection)
- Collections: Over 360,000 plant specimens, including vascular and non-vascular plants, fungi, and lichens
- Collection size: ~360,000 specimens (as of 2025)
- Director: Daniel Spalink, Ph.D.
- Curator: Dale A. Kruse
- Website: tracyherbarium.tamu.edu

The S.M. Tracy Herbarium (Index Herbariorum acronym: TAES) is a major herbarium located at Texas A&M University in College Station, Texas, United States. It serves as a significant research collection of preserved plant, fungi, and lichen specimens, primarily emphasizing the flora of Texas, the Southern United States, Mexico, and the Caribbean. It is currently the third largest herbarium in Texas.

== History ==
The origins of the S.M. Tracy Herbarium trace back to December 1917, when botanist Samuel Mills Tracy (1847–1920) donated his extensive Gulf Coast plant collections and personal library to Texas A&M University. The herbarium itself was formally established shortly thereafter in the early 1930s, built upon Tracy's foundational collections. Its Index Herbariorum acronym, TAES, refers to the Texas Agricultural Experiment Station (now Texas AgriLife Research), the state agency that initially housed the herbarium administratively.

In 2012, the S.M. Tracy Herbarium received a $500,000 National Science Foundation (NSF) Grant through the Collections in Support of Biological Research Program (CSBR). This funding facilitated the incorporation of the Texas A&M University Department of Biology Herbarium (TAMU), which comprised approximately 44,000 specimens, into the TAES collection. This merger allowed for the consolidation of previous collection databases and relieved significant overcrowding in the collection cabinets.

== Collections ==
The S.M. Tracy Herbarium houses approximately 360,000 specimens, with an average of 2,500–3,000 new accessions added annually. The collection includes specimens from every continent, though it places a significant emphasis on the flora of Texas, the Southern United States, Mexico, and the Caribbean.

The herbarium maintains one of the largest collections of grasses in the Southern U.S. and holds substantial representation from most vascular plant families. Additionally, TAES contains significant collections of non-vascular plants (such as mosses, liverworts, and hornworts), and the largest collection of fungi in the state of Texas.

The type collection at TAES consists of 199 type specimens, including 130 Poaceae, 19 Asteraceae, 17 Cyperaceae, and 15 holotypes. The herbarium also serves as a designated repository for collections from several National Park Service units, including Big Thicket National Preserve, Padre Island National Seashore, Natchez Trace National Parkway, and Palo Alto National Battlefield.

A significant ongoing effort involves the digitization of the herbarium's collections. Previous collection databases were consolidated, and specimen data and images are now available to the scientific community and the public through portals like iDigBio. Beyond the named leadership and research associates, the herbarium's collections have been enriched by the contributions of numerous other recognized collectors throughout its history, including V.L. Cory, J.J. Jiménez, F.J. Lindheimer, J.L. McGraw Jr., G.C. Nealley, H.B. Parks, C.G. Pringle, I. Shiller, G. Watson, and S.E. Wolff. The herbarium is recognized for its role in solving mysteries of the plant world, aiding researchers in identifying plants, including potentially invasive species and those toxic to wildlife and livestock.

== Research and services ==
The S.M. Tracy Herbarium supports a wide range of botanical research, particularly in the taxonomy and floristics of North American Poaceae, Cyperaceae, and Juncaceae, as well as wetland plants. Researchers associated with the herbarium have published numerous papers on grass systematics and Texas flora. The herbarium and its role in documenting biodiversity and providing services to the public were also featured in a 2022 episode of the PBS television show Texas A&M Today. Additionally, the herbarium was highlighted in a 2015 video from AgriLife Today - Texas Agriculture News, which featured then-Director Dr. Stephan Hatch and Curator Dale Kruse discussing the importance of the collection and its role in solving mysteries of the plant world.

Beyond research, the herbarium provides services such as floristic inventories and surveys, contributing to the understanding and documentation of regional biodiversity. Its staff also contributes to educational initiatives, such as teaching workshops on bryophytes for university students from institutions like Hardin-Simmons University.

== Leadership and key personnel ==
Over its history, the S.M. Tracy Herbarium has benefited from the contributions of several distinguished individuals.

=== Current leadership ===
Daniel Spalink: Current Director and an Assistant Professor of Plant Systematics in the Department of Ecology and Conservation Biology at Texas A&M University. Spalink's research focuses on understanding the origin and extent of plant biodiversity, the drivers of speciation, and developing proactive strategies for conserving biodiversity. He holds a Ph.D. in Botany from the University of Wisconsin-Madison.

Dale Kruse: Current Curator, serving since 1999. Kruse's research interests involve the systematics, ecology, and biogeography of bryophytes (mosses, liverworts, and hornworts) and lichens, with extensive field research across the U.S. and internationally. He is also known for co-leading the Bryophyte TWiG and overseeing the merger of the TAMU Biology Department Herbarium into TAES.

=== Past directors ===
Stephan L. Hatch (1945–2024; Director from c. 1979–2017): Hatch oversaw substantial growth in the herbarium's holdings across all taxonomic groups. He is a published author on grass systematics and co-authored several books on grass and range plant identification.

Frank W. Gould (1913–1981; Director from 1949 to 1979): A prominent botanist, Gould served as a significant figure in the herbarium's early development and research, particularly in grass systematics. He was a former Director, with Stephan L. Hatch taking over the role after his retirement.

Harris B. Parks (1879–1958; Curator and Botanist from 1945 to 1949): Parks, an apiculturist, entomologist, and botanist, became curator and botanist of the Tracy Herbarium after moving to College Station. He was known for his work on bees and co-authored the Flora and Fauna of the Big Thicket Area and the first catalog of vascular plants of Texas.

== Research associates ==
The S.M. Tracy Herbarium has been associated with several notable research associates who have contributed significantly to its collections and botanical research:

David P. Lewis: A regional mycologist, Lewis deposited the majority of the macro-fungal specimens at the S.M. Tracy Herbarium, contributing to the largest collection of its kind in Texas. He has collected extensively across the Gulf Coast and is a co-author of Mushrooms of the Gulf Coast States.

Austin R. Kelly: Former Assistant Curator and Botanist, and current President and lead botanist of partner organization ARK Ecological Consulting.

Monique Reed (deceased): A former Herbarium Botanist for the Texas A&M University Department of Biology Herbarium (TAMU) before its merger with TAES, Reed's research interests include education in biological sciences, herbarium management, and the Texas flora. She has published papers on the Texas Flora and co-authored the Illustrated Flora of East Texas, Volume One.

== Location ==
The S.M. Tracy Herbarium is physically located at 3380 University Drive East, Room 131, College Station, Texas 77845.
