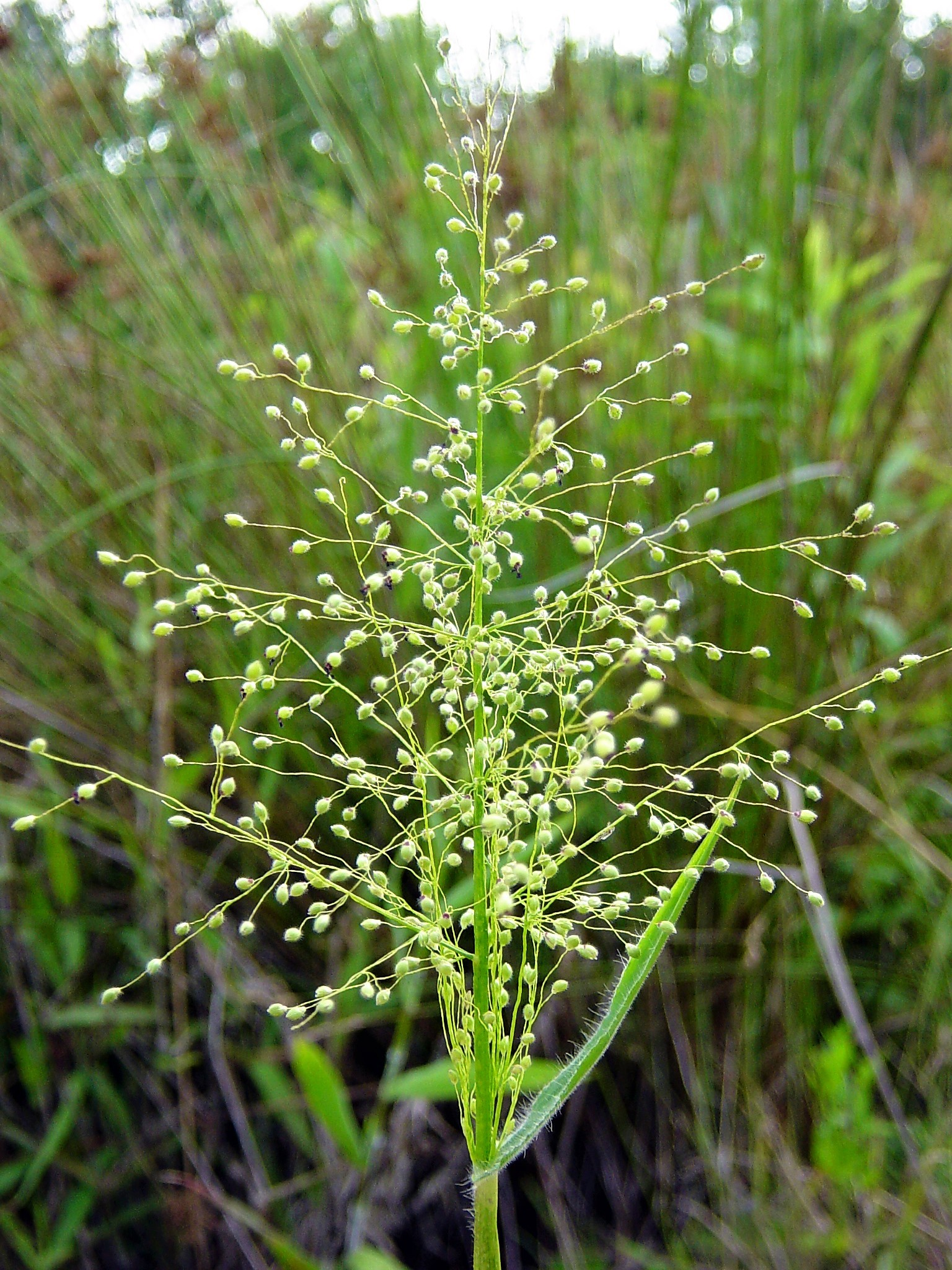

Conservation status
- Apparently Secure (NatureServe)

Scientific classification
- Kingdom: Plantae
- Clade: Tracheophytes
- Clade: Angiosperms
- Clade: Monocots
- Clade: Commelinids
- Order: Poales
- Family: Poaceae
- Subfamily: Panicoideae
- Genus: Dichanthelium
- Species: D. scabriusculum

Binomial name
- Dichanthelium scabriusculum (Elliott) Gould & C.A.Clark

= Dichanthelium scabriusculum =

Species of flowering plant

Dichanthelium scabriusculum, commonly called tall swamp rosette-panicgrass, tall swamp panicgrass, rough panic-grass or panic grass, is a species of plant found in North America. It is listed as endangered in Connecticut, Maryland, and New York. It is listed as threatened in Massachusetts.

D. scabriusculum has been observed growing in wet, lowland environments. This includes habitats such as streams, bogs, marshes, and swamps.
