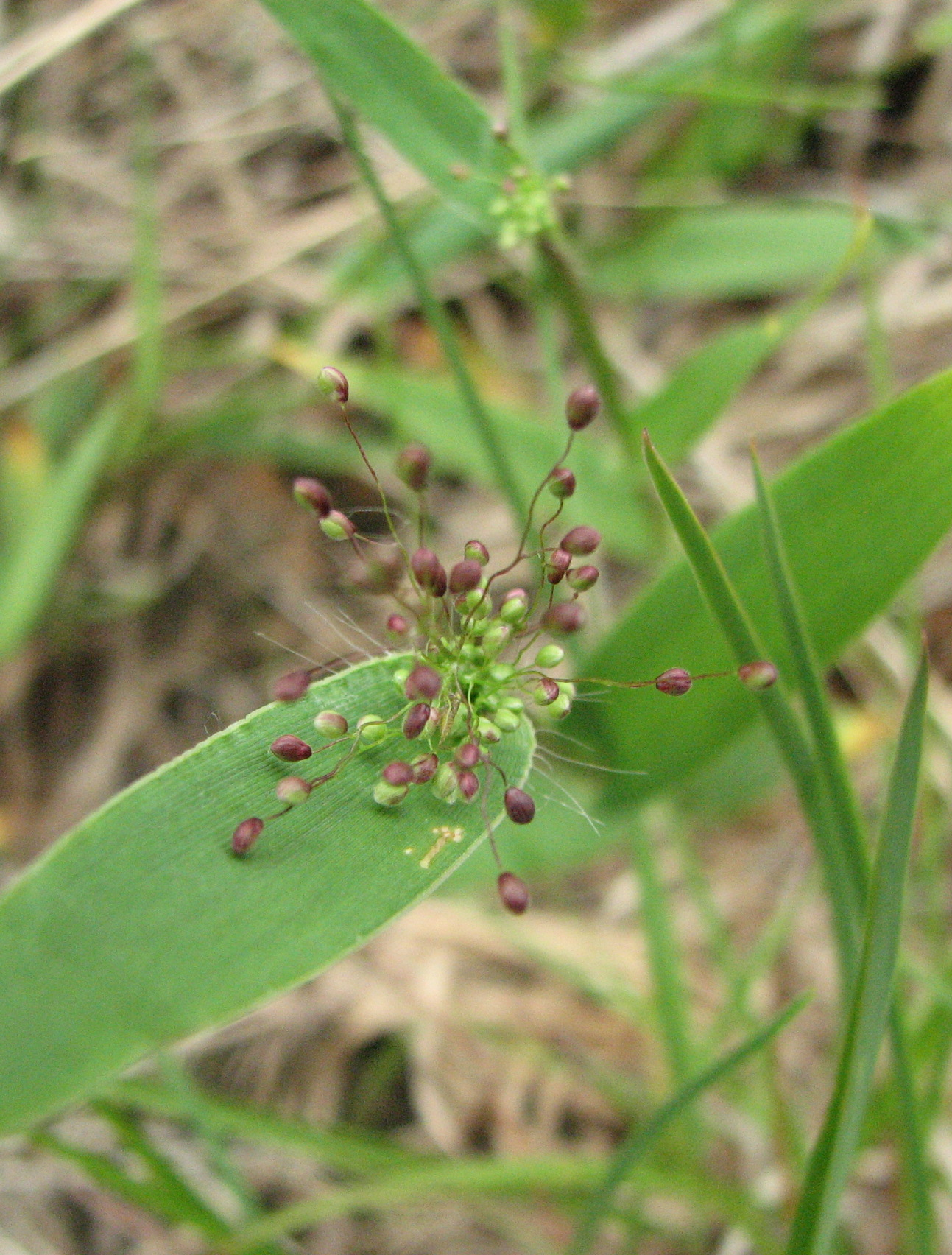

Scientific classification
- Kingdom: Plantae
- Clade: Tracheophytes
- Clade: Angiosperms
- Clade: Monocots
- Clade: Commelinids
- Order: Poales
- Family: Poaceae
- Subfamily: Panicoideae
- Genus: Dichanthelium
- Species: D. sphaerocarpon

Binomial name
- Dichanthelium sphaerocarpon (Elliott) Gould

Synonyms
- Panicum polyanthes

= Dichanthelium sphaerocarpon =

Species of flowering plant

Dichanthelium sphaerocarpon, also called Panicum polyanthes, common name round-seed panic grass, is a plant found in North America. It is listed as endangered in Michigan. Dichanthelium sphaerocarpon var. isophyllum is listed as a special concern and believed extirpated in Connecticut.

== Description ==
D. sphaerocarpon may reach a height of 1.5 to 5 decimeters (approximately 0.49 to 1.64 feet). The blades can reach a length of up to 9.5 centimeters (approximately 3.74 inches) and a width between 2 and 20 millimeters.

== Distribution and habitat ==
This species can be found in the eastern United States, with its range stretching from Massachusetts south to Florida and westward to Texas.

D. sphaerocarpon grows in thin woods, meadows, and ditches. It is commonly found in dry, sandy soil.
