= Dichanthelium leucothrix =

Scientific classification
- Kingdom: Plantae
- Clade: Tracheophytes
- Clade: Angiosperms
- Clade: Monocots
- Clade: Commelinids
- Order: Poales
- Family: Poaceae
- Subfamily: Panicoideae
- Genus: Dichanthelium
- Species: D. leucothrix

Binomial name
- Dichanthelium leucothrix (Nash) Freckmann

Species of graminoid

Dichanthelium leucothrix, commonly known as rough witchgrass, is a species of perennial graminoid in the family Poaceae found throughout the Americas.

== Description ==
Rough witchgrass has distinct basal rosettes and occasional branching from nodes above the base. Culms range from 30 to 65 cm tall, with slightly bearded nodes and internodes that are either smooth or softly hairy. Leaf blades are up to 6 cm long and 2–5 cm wide, glabrous above with coarse hairs near the base, softly hairy beneath, and have scabrous, sometimes ciliate margins. Sheaths are sparsely pilose or glabrous, and the ligules are ciliate, measuring 2–3 mm long. The panicle is 3–6 cm long and 2.5–4 cm wide, with spreading branches that are smooth or slightly hairy. Spikelets are small and ellipsoid (1.2–1.4 mm long), with smooth stalks. The first glume is truncate or acute, very short (0.2–0.5 mm), and may be glabrous or pubescent. The second glume and sterile lemma are pubescent and obtuse, while the fertile lemma and palea are hardened and measure 1.1–1.5 mm long.

== Distribution and habitat ==
In the United States, rough witchgrass is found in southern New Jersey south to Florida and west to Texas. It is also found in the West Indies and northern South America. It grows in wet sandy, peaty, or mucky soil of pinelands and depression marshes.

== Ecology ==
Rough witchgrass responds positively to fire, which stimulates the seed bank, leading to an increase in distribution and abundance.

It flowers from May through October.
