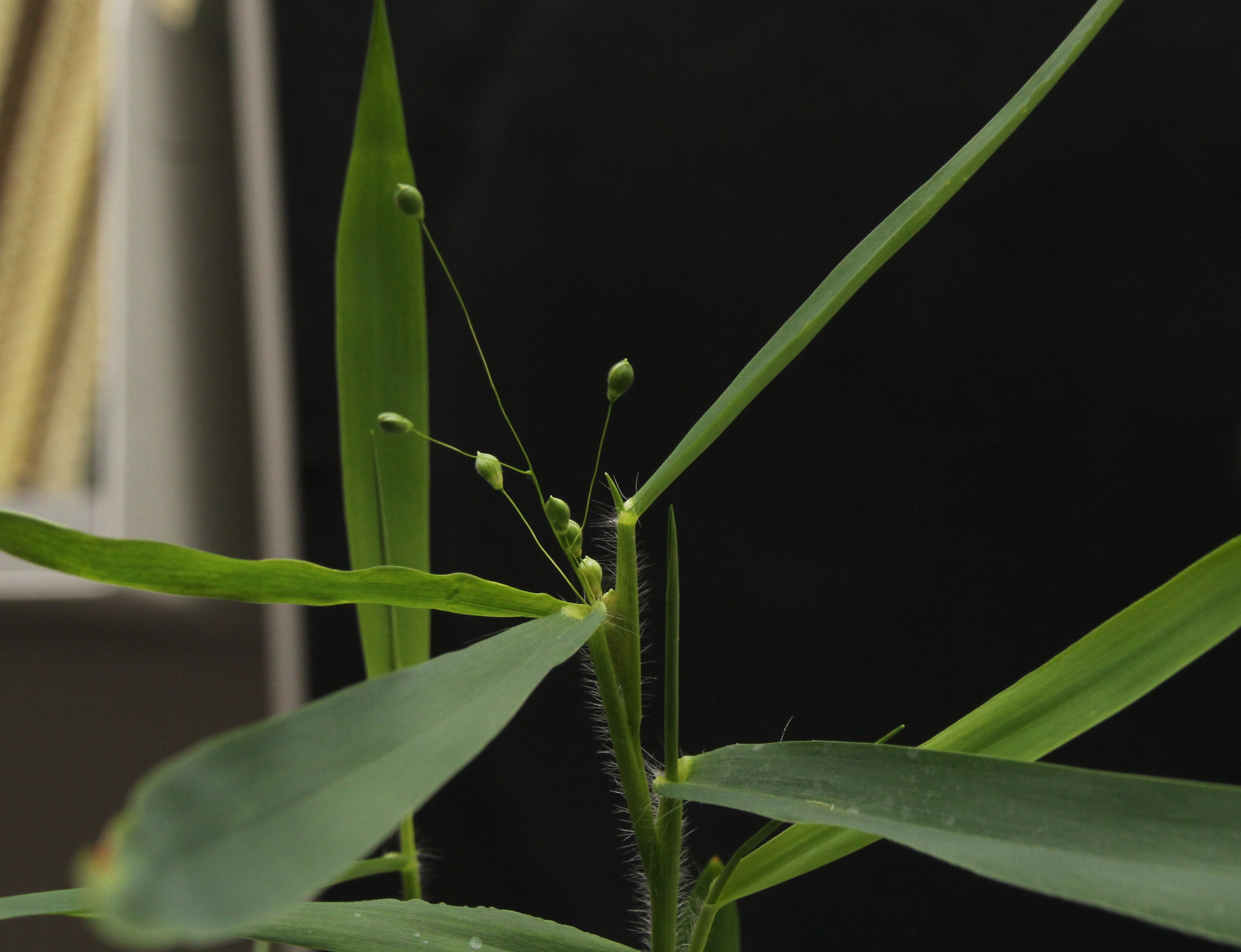

Scientific classification
- Kingdom: Plantae
- Clade: Embryophytes
- Clade: Tracheophytes
- Clade: Spermatophytes
- Clade: Angiosperms
- Clade: Monocots
- Clade: Commelinids
- Order: Poales
- Family: Poaceae
- Subfamily: Panicoideae
- Genus: Dichanthelium
- Species: D. oligosanthes

Binomial name
- Dichanthelium oligosanthes (Schult.) Gould

Synonyms
- Panicum oligosanthes Gould

= Dichanthelium oligosanthes =

Species of grass

Dichanthelium oligosanthes, known as Heller's rosette grass, fewanther obscuregrass, and few-flowered panicgrass, is a frost-tolerant, perennial grass species native to North America. It is found primarily in the contiguous United States with specimens also reported in British Columbia and Alberta in Canada, as well as south of the Rio Grande in northern Mexico. D. oligosanthes is most frequently in partially shaded glens within woods, recently cut forests, and grassy banks.

The species is primarily cleistogamous, with individual florets often self pollinate without opening. Despite being a member of the grass subfamily Panicoideae which includes many species which utilize C4 photosynthesis, D. oligosanthes retains the more ancestral trait, using a C3 photosynthetic pathway.

The genome of Dichanthelium oligosanthes is carried on nine chromosomes and is estimated to be between 750 and 950 megabases in size. A draft genome assembly was generated from the progeny of a single self-pollinated plant collected from the Shaw Nature Reserve near Gray Summit, Missouri.
