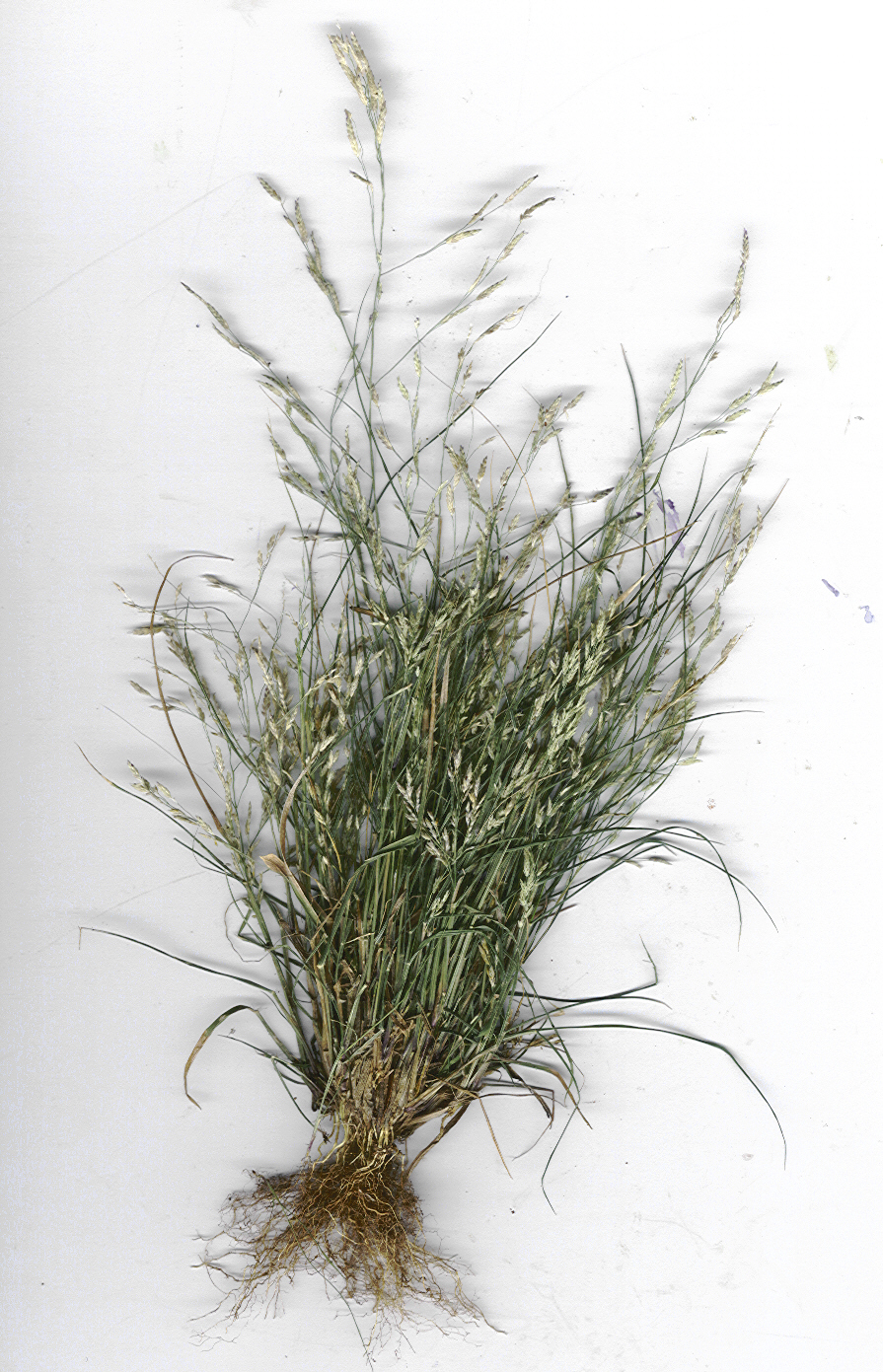

Scientific classification
- Kingdom: Plantae
- Clade: Tracheophytes
- Clade: Angiosperms
- Clade: Monocots
- Clade: Commelinids
- Order: Poales
- Family: Poaceae
- Subfamily: Chloridoideae
- Genus: Eragrostis
- Species: E. pectinacea

Binomial name
- Eragrostis pectinacea (Michx.) Nees ex Steud.

= Eragrostis pectinacea =

Species of plant

Eragrostis pectinacea is a species of grass known by the common names tufted lovegrass and Carolina lovegrass. This plant is native to the Americas from Canada to Argentina. It is widespread, growing in most open spaces at varying elevations and habitats, including in disturbed areas and roadsides.

== Description ==
Eragrostis pectinacea is an annual tuft-forming bunchgrass, reaching maximum heights of anywhere from 10 to 80 centimeters. It is mostly hairless except for a fringe of hairs near where the leaf blade meets the sheath. The inflorescence is open with spreading branches holding yellowish to purplish spikelets, each just under centimeter long. Each narrow spikelet has up to 15 or 20 tiny florets.

== Taxonomy ==
Eragrostis pectinacea was first described by André Michaux in 1803, as Poa pectinacea. It was transferred to Eragrostis in 1841 by Christian Nees von Esenbeck. Eragrostis tracyi is treated by some sources as a variety of this species, but recognized by others as a separate species.

== Distribution ==
Eragrostis pectinacea is widely distributed in the Americas, from Canada through the United States to Mexico in northern America, in Central America and the Caribbean, and in parts of South America. It has been introduced into Europe and further south than its native range in South America, in northeast Argentina and Uruguay.
