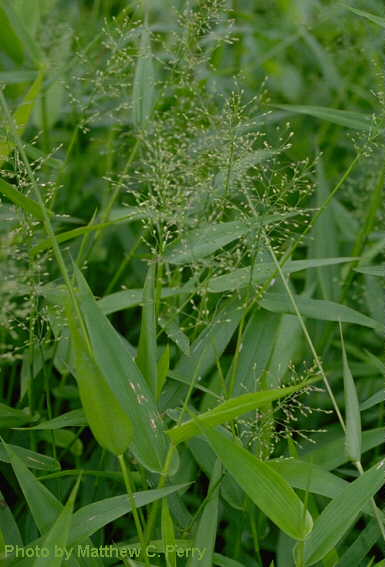

Conservation status
- Secure (NatureServe)

Scientific classification
- Kingdom: Plantae
- Clade: Tracheophytes
- Clade: Angiosperms
- Clade: Monocots
- Clade: Commelinids
- Order: Poales
- Family: Poaceae
- Subfamily: Panicoideae
- Genus: Dichanthelium
- Species: D. clandestinum

Binomial name
- Dichanthelium clandestinum (L.) Gould

= Dichanthelium clandestinum =

Species of grass

Dichanthelium clandestinum is a species of grass known by the common name deertongue. It is native to eastern North America, including eastern Canada and the eastern United States.

This species is a rhizomatous perennial grass forming clumps of hairy stems up to 1.4 meters tall. Five to 10 leaves are located along the stem. Each is up to 25 centimeters long by 3 wide, lance-shaped, sometimes rigid, and hairless to slightly hairy. There are two types of inflorescence. The main panicle contains many spikelets with flowers that open and are pollinated. Another type of inflorescence contains cleistogamous flowers: flowers which do not open and pollinate themselves. These are located in the sheaths of the stem leaves and are sometimes hidden. They are produced later in the year than the open panicle. There are about 400,000 seeds per pound.

This plant is tolerant of high levels of aluminum in soils. It tolerates acid soils and thin, infertile soils. It can be used to revegetate reclaimed land such as mine spoils. The cultivar 'Tioga' has been available since 1975.

The seeds of deertongue attract many types of birds, such as turkeys. The grass is not considered a good forage for livestock because it is low in nutrients.
