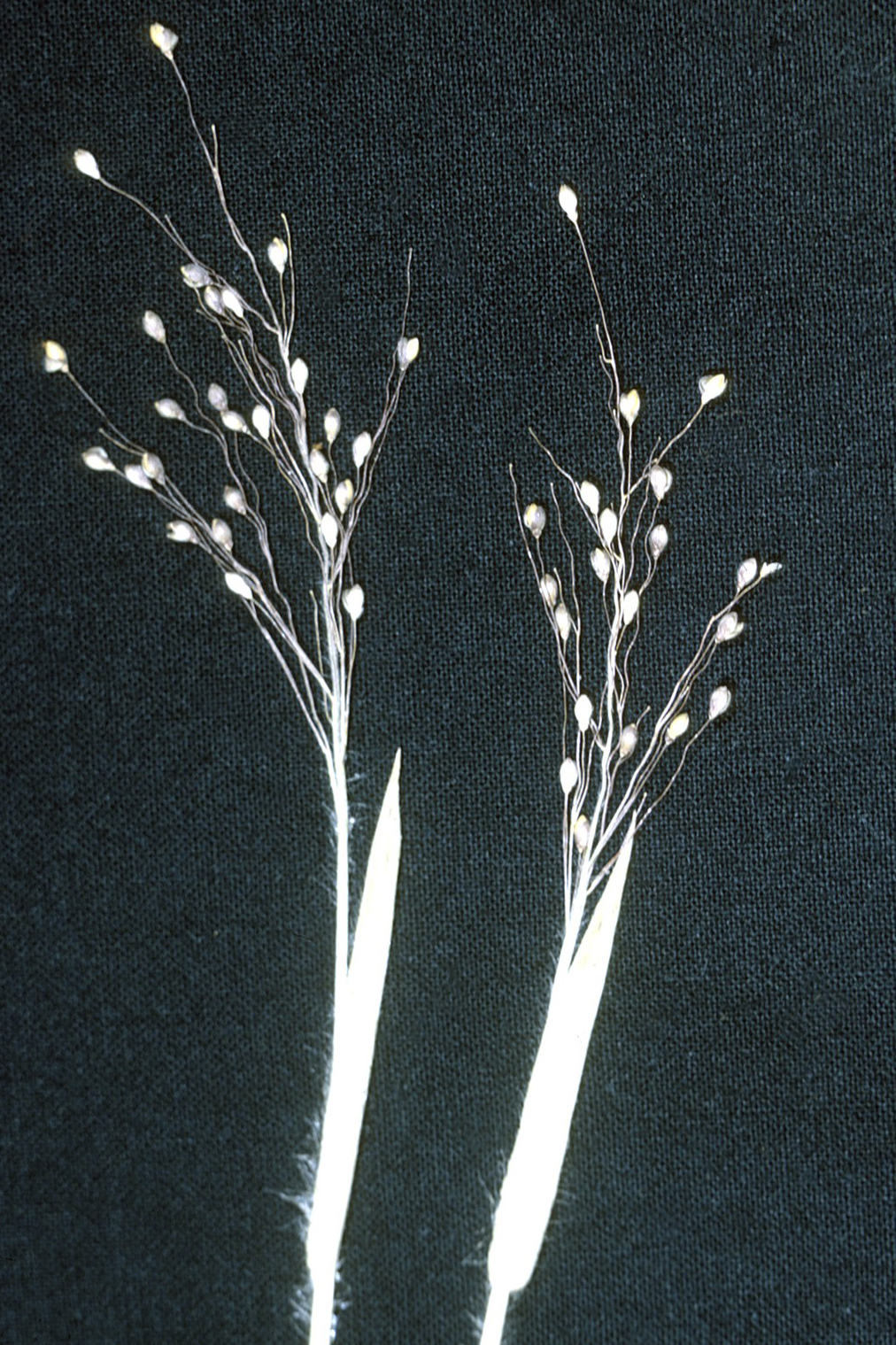

Scientific classification
- Kingdom: Plantae
- Clade: Tracheophytes
- Clade: Angiosperms
- Clade: Monocots
- Clade: Commelinids
- Order: Poales
- Family: Poaceae
- Subfamily: Panicoideae
- Genus: Dichanthelium
- Species: D. ovale

Binomial name
- Dichanthelium ovale (Elliott) Gould & C.A.Clark

= Dichanthelium ovale =

Species of flowering plant

Dichanthelium ovale, commonly known as eggleaf rosette grass, is a plant found in North America. Dichanthelium ovale subsp. pseudopubescens, common name Stiff-leaved rosette-panicgrass is listed as a special concern and believed extirpated in Connecticut.

D. ovale can grow in soils ranging from dry to damp, and has been observed in habitats such as sandy woods and pinelands.
