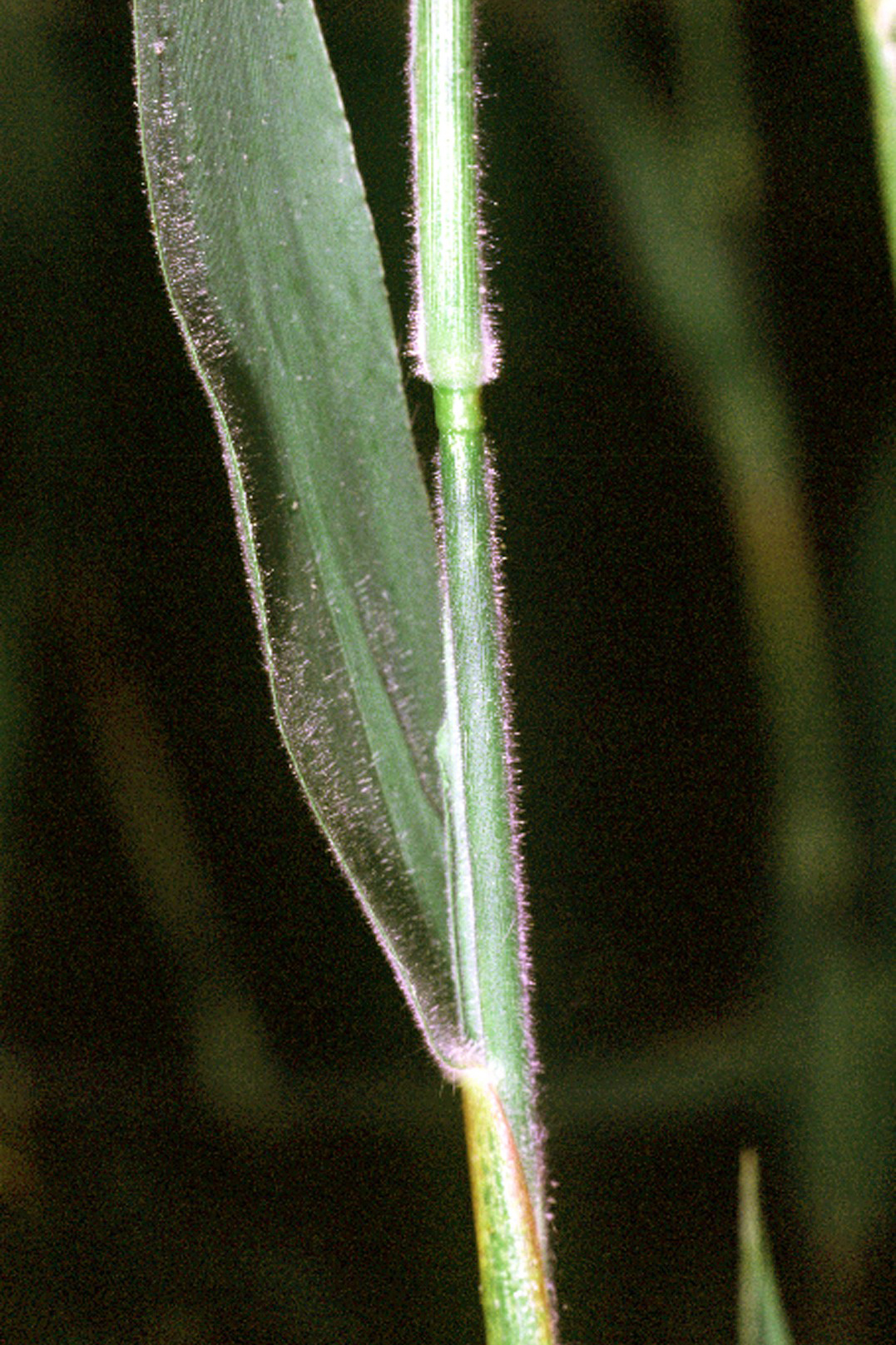

Conservation status
- Secure (NatureServe)

Scientific classification
- Kingdom: Plantae
- Clade: Tracheophytes
- Clade: Angiosperms
- Clade: Monocots
- Clade: Commelinids
- Order: Poales
- Family: Poaceae
- Subfamily: Panicoideae
- Genus: Dichanthelium
- Species: D. scoparium

Binomial name
- Dichanthelium scoparium (Lam.) Gould

= Dichanthelium scoparium =

Species of plant

Dichanthelium scoparium is a species of grass known by the common names velvet panicum, velvety panicgrass, and broom panicgrass. It is native to North America, where it occurs in the southeastern United States. It also occurs in the West Indies.

This rhizomatous perennial grass produces a basal rosette of leaves in the fall and winter and then erect stems the following spring. There are clumps of stems up to 1.5 meters tall. There are 7 to 11 hairy leaves up to 20 centimeters long by 2 wide on the stem. There are two types of inflorescence. The main panicle has flowers that open and are pollinated. There are also cleistogamous flowers that do not open and fertilize themselves. These develop later in the season. There are about 380,000 seeds per pound.

This grass grows in woodlands and savannas. It may inhabit disturbed habitat. It has displayed preference for moist sandy soils, as well as coarse to medium textured soil.
