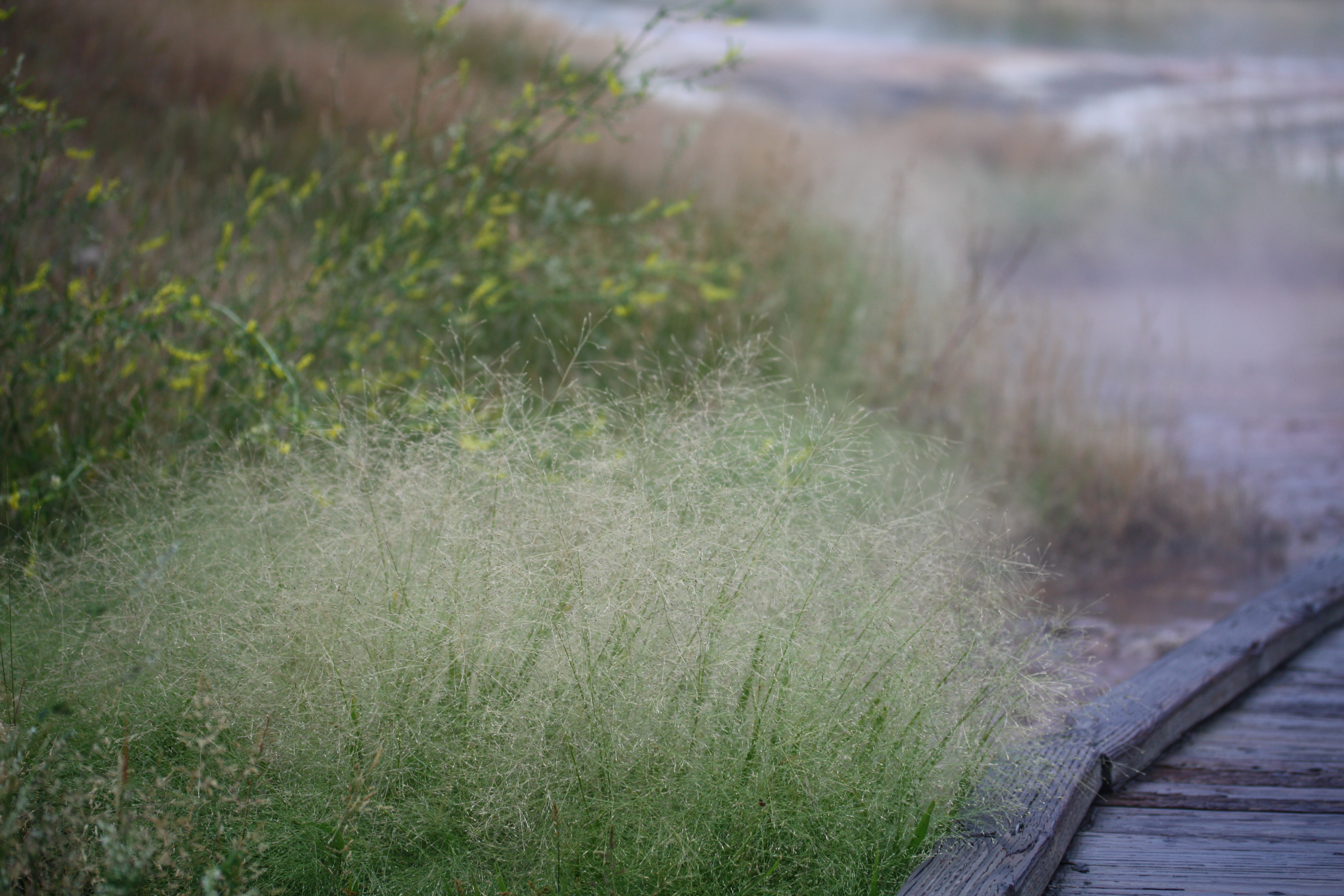
- Dichanthelium acuminatum subsp. sericeum

Scientific classification
- Kingdom: Plantae
- Clade: Embryophytes
- Clade: Tracheophytes
- Clade: Spermatophytes
- Clade: Angiosperms
- Clade: Monocots
- Clade: Commelinids
- Order: Poales
- Family: Poaceae
- Subfamily: Panicoideae
- Genus: Dichanthelium
- Species: D. acuminatum

Binomial name
- Dichanthelium acuminatum (Sw.) Gould & C.A. Clark

= Dichanthelium acuminatum =

Species of plant

Dichanthelium acuminatum, the tapered rosette grass, is a species of grass from the genus Dichanthelium, in North America.

Dichanthelium acuminatum forms a hybridization complex with other Dichanthelium species such as D. dichotomum, D. sphaerocarpon, D. ovale, and D. aciculare.

Dichanthelium acuminatum has been successfully raised in cultivation for seed production.

This species has been observed growing in habitat types such as within oak and pine forests, wetland edges, and on sand dunes.
