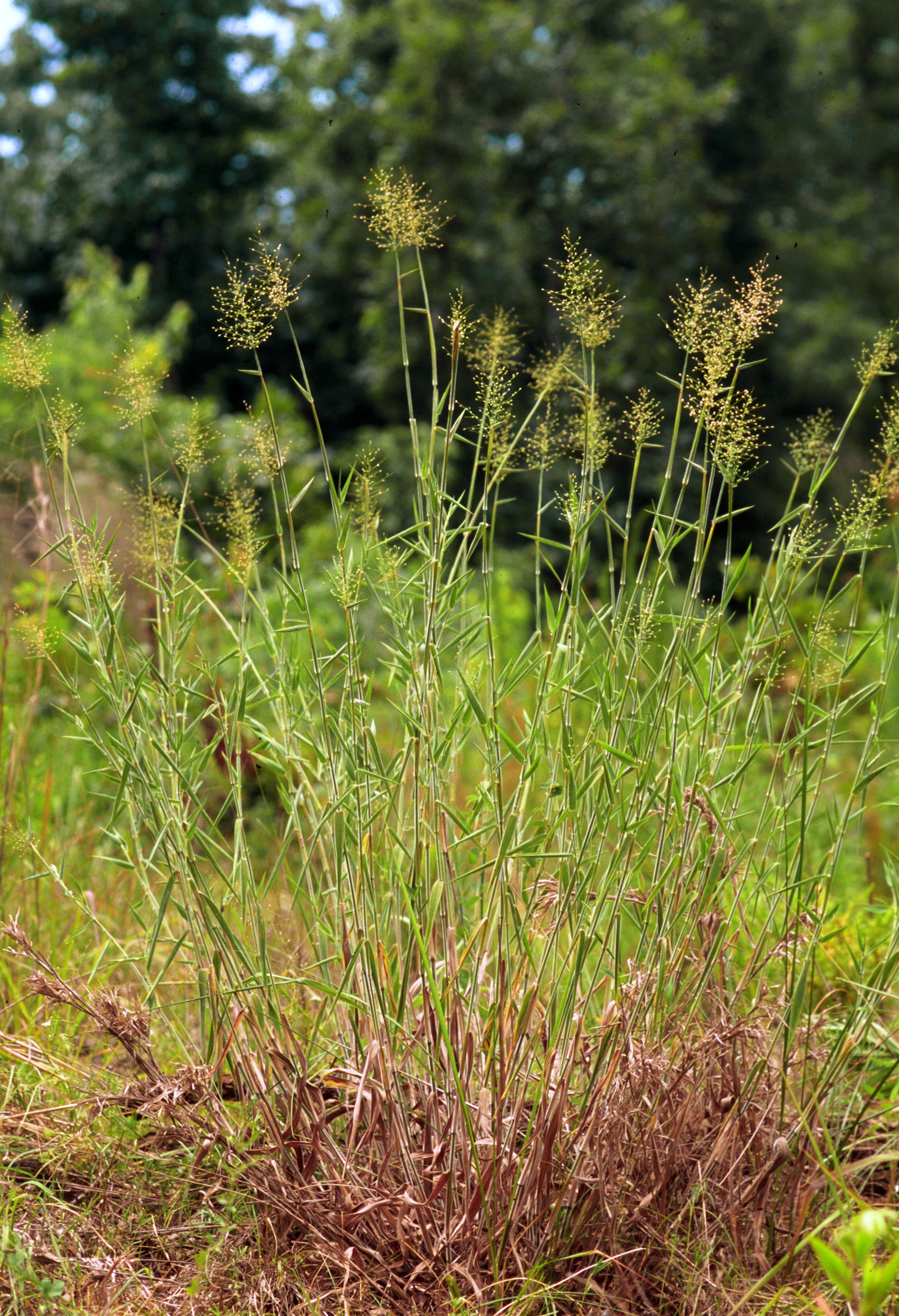
- Dichanthelium scoparium

Scientific classification
- Kingdom: Plantae
- Clade: Embryophytes
- Clade: Tracheophytes
- Clade: Spermatophytes
- Clade: Angiosperms
- Clade: Monocots
- Clade: Commelinids
- Order: Poales
- Family: Poaceae
- Subfamily: Panicoideae
- Supertribe: Panicodae
- Tribe: Paniceae
- Subtribe: Dichantheliinae
- Genus: Dichanthelium (Hitchc. & Chase) Gould

= Dichanthelium =

Genus of plants

Dichanthelium is genus of flowering plants of the grass family, Poaceae. They are known commonly as rosette grasses and panicgrasses.

== Taxonomy ==
Formerly a subgenus of the genus Panicum, Dichanthelium was elevated to genus status in 1974. Its species are still treated as members of Panicum by some authorities, because the two genera are very similar in form. Molecular data support the recognition of Dichanthelium as a separate genus.

The name Dichanthelium originates from the Greek for "twice-flowering", in reference to the vernal and autumnal growth phases.

== Description ==
These are perennial cool-season (C_{3}) grasses, sometimes with rhizomes. The grasses may overwinter as rosettes of short, wide leaves and then produce longer, wider leaves on the stem during spring. They produce hollow stems a few centimeters tall to well over one meter. They are upright to erect when new, then sometimes sprawling, spreading, and bending as the season progresses. The upper stems may have a few main branches that divide into smaller branches bearing panicles. There are primary panicles, which may be chasmogamous, and secondary panicles, which are often cleistogamous. The spikelets are roughly 1 to 5 millimeters long and lack awns.

In the Chicago area, Dichanthelium is considered the most emblematic genus of the Gulf and Atlantic coastal plain disjunct habitat found in that region.

== Species ==
There are about 72 species in the genus. Species include:

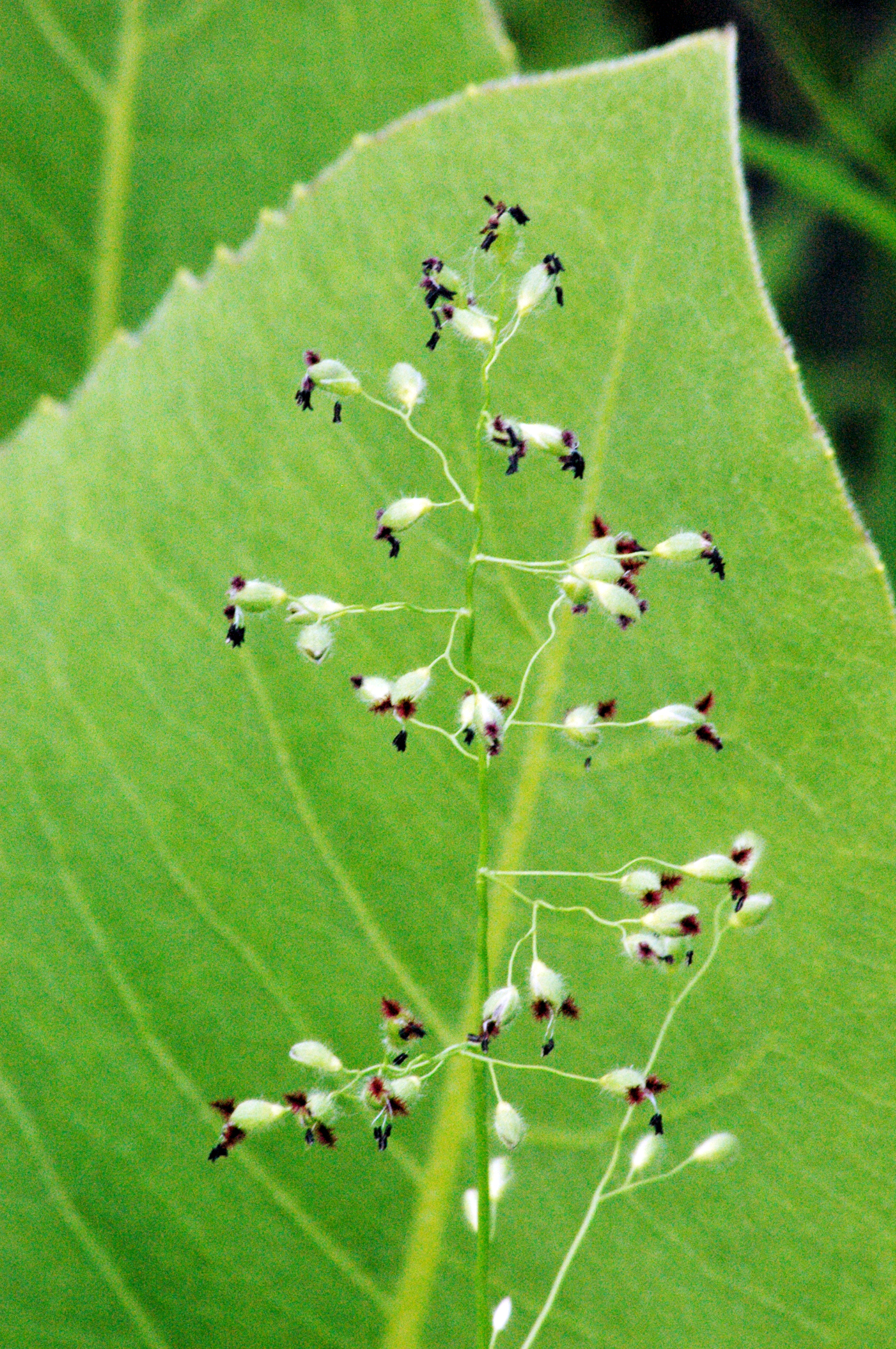
Dichanthelium leibergii

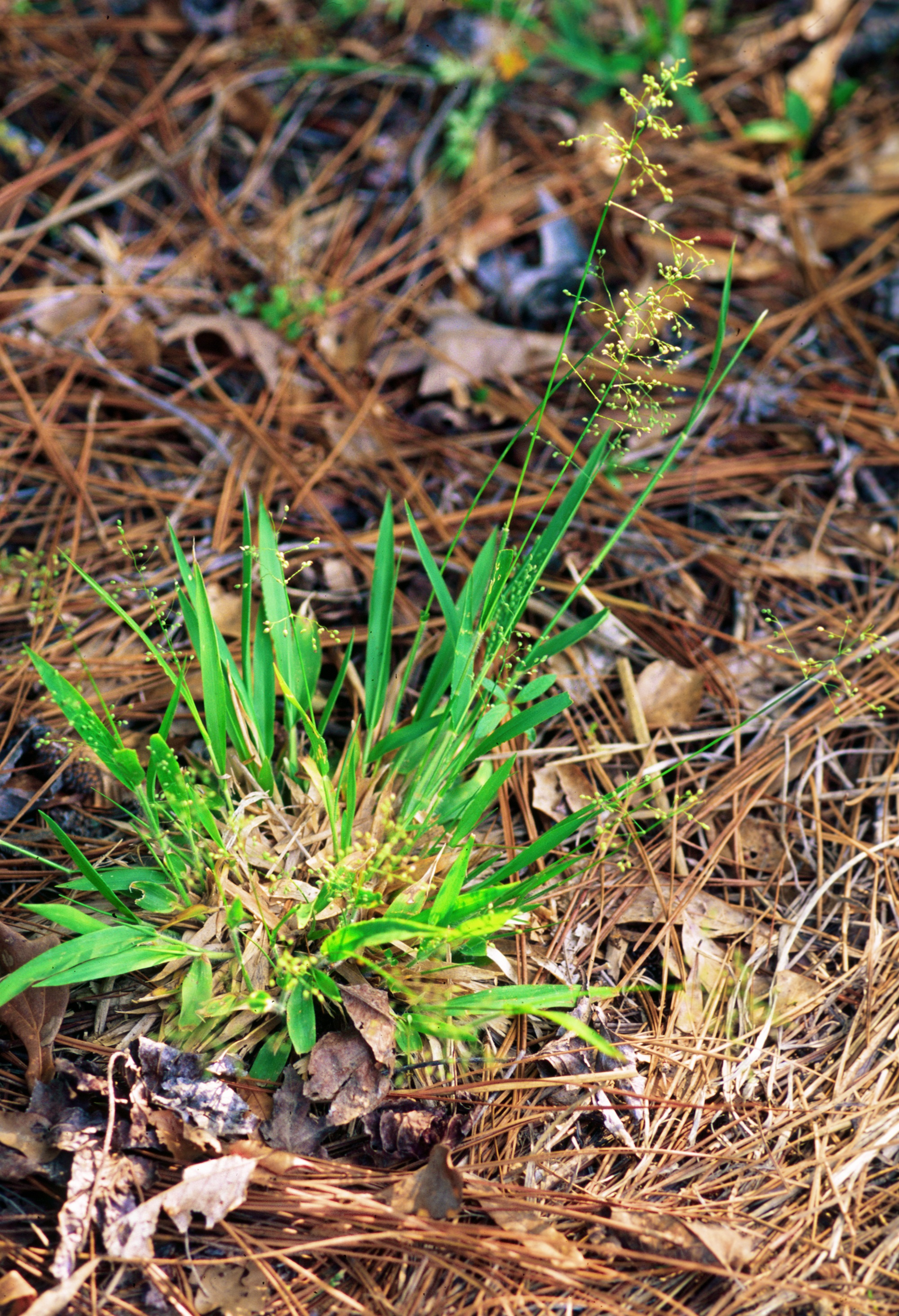
Dichanthelium laxiflorum

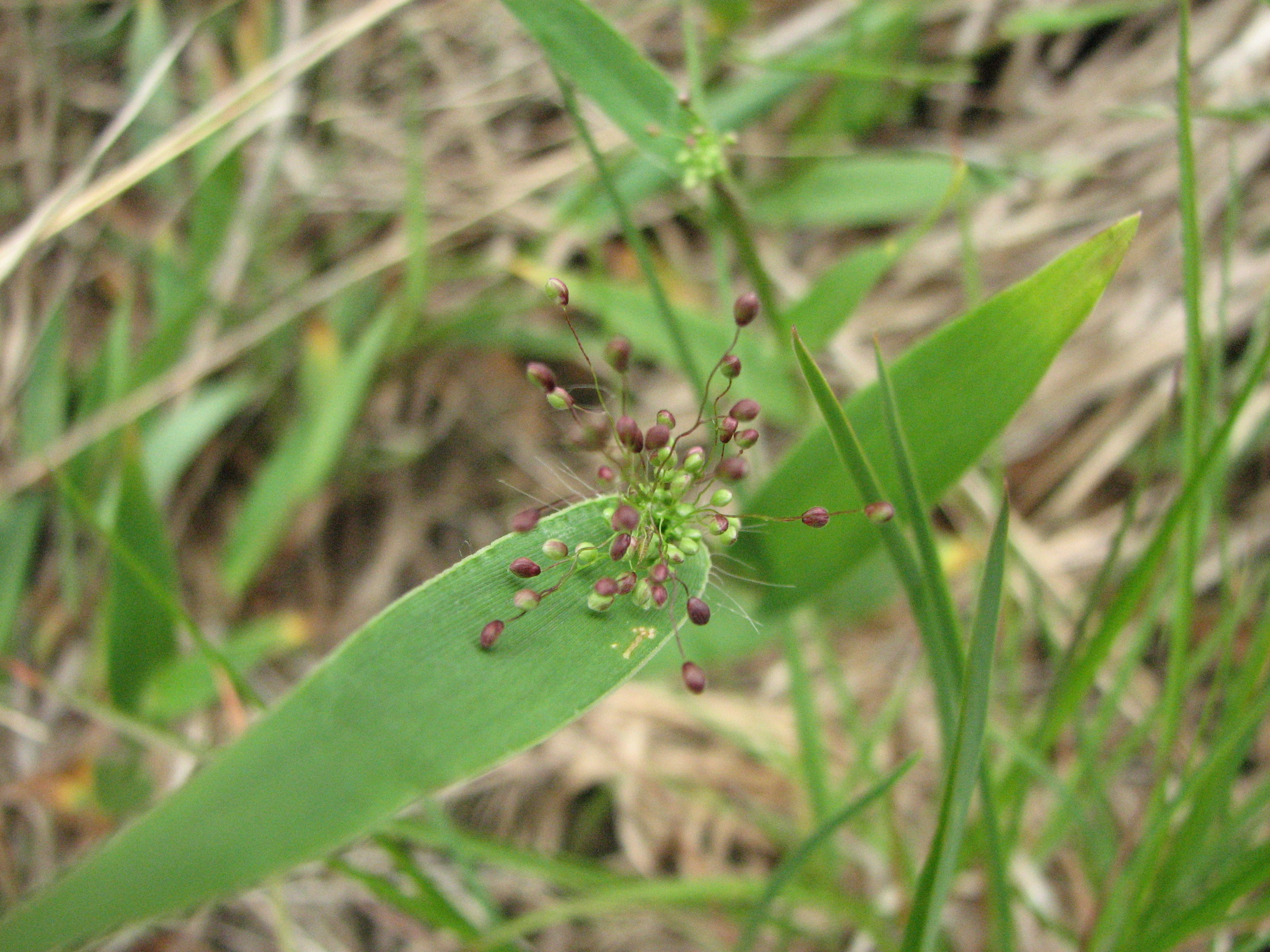
Dichanthelium sphaerocarpon

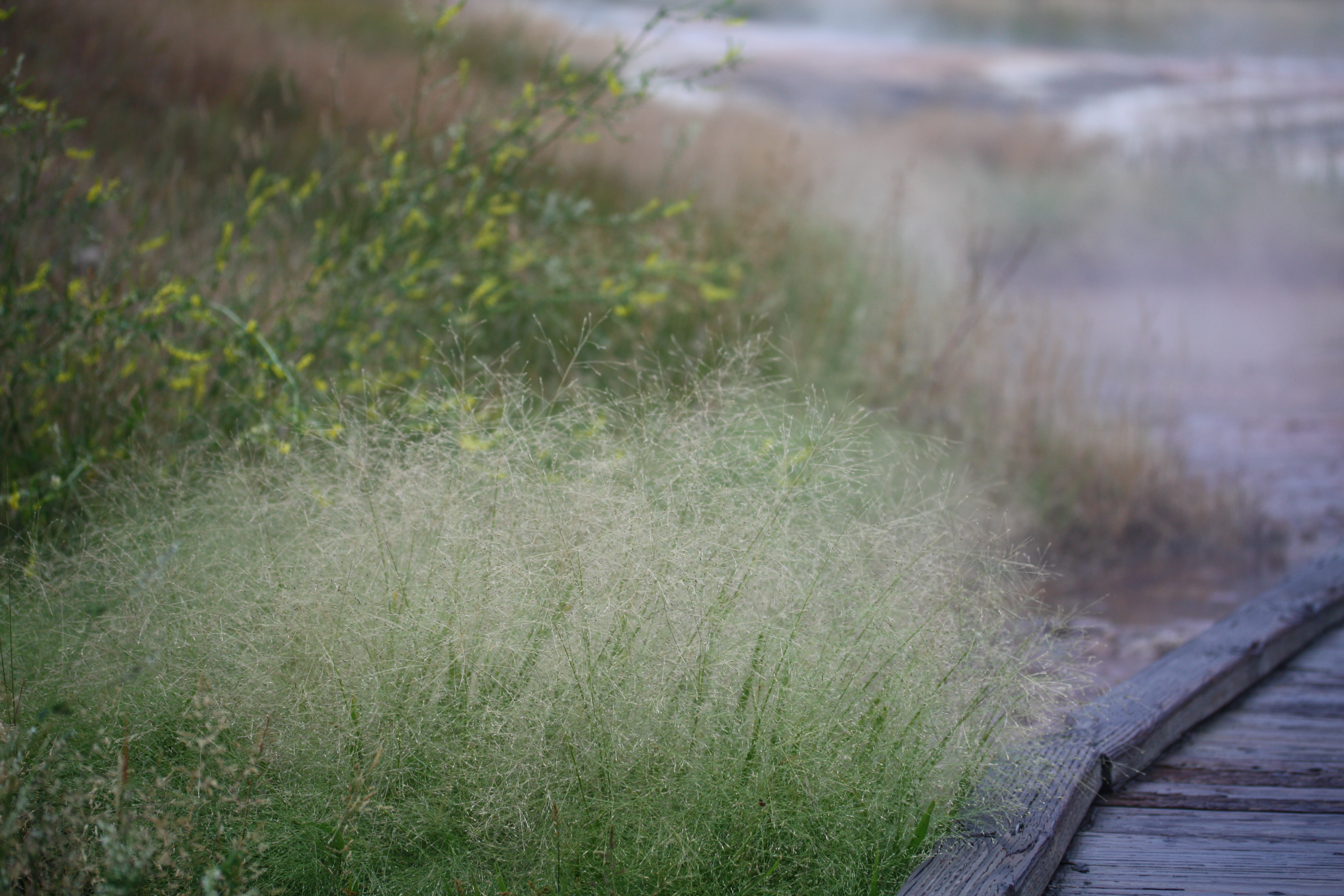
Dichanthelium acuminatum ssp. sericeum

- Dichanthelium aciculare (Desv. ex Poir.) Gould & C.A.Clark – needleleaf rosette grass, narrow-leaved panicgrass
- Dichanthelium acuminatum (Sw.) Gould &C.A. Clark – tapered rosette grass, hotsprings rosette grass, hairy panicgrass
- Dichanthelium adenorhachis (Zuloaga & Morrone) Zuloaga
- Dichanthelium aequivaginatum (Swallen) Zuloaga
- Dichanthelium albomaculatum (Scribn.) Gould
- Dichanthelium angustifolium (Elliott) Gould
- Dichanthelium annulum (Ashe) LeBlond
- Dichanthelium assurgens (Renvoize) Zuloaga
- Dichanthelium boreale (Nash) Freckmann – northern panicgrass
- Dichanthelium boscii (Poir.) Gould & C.A.Clark – Bosc's panicgrass
- Dichanthelium cabrerae (Zuloaga & Morrone) Zuloaga
- Dichanthelium caerulescens (Hack. ex Hitchc.) Correll
- Dichanthelium caparoense (Zuloaga & Morrone) Zuloaga
- Dichanthelium chamaelonche (Trin.) Freckmann & Lelong – small-seeded panicgrass
- Dichanthelium clandestinum (L.) Gould – deertongue
- Dichanthelium columbianum (Scribn.) Freckmann
- Dichanthelium commonsianum (Ashe) Freckmann
- Dichanthelium commutatum (Schult.) Gould – variable panicgrass
- Dichanthelium congestum (Renvoize) Zuloaga
- Dichanthelium conjugens (Skottsb.) C.A.Clark & Gould
- Dichanthelium cordovense (E.Fourn.) Davidse
- Dichanthelium cucaense (Zuloaga & Morrone) Zuloaga
- Dichanthelium cumbucana (Renvoize) Zuloaga
- Dichanthelium cynodon (Reichardt) C.A.Clark & Gould – tussock panicgrass
- Dichanthelium davidsei (Zuloaga & Morrone) Zuloaga
- Dichanthelium depauperatum (Muhl.) Gould – starved panicgrass
- Dichanthelium dichotomum (L.) Gould – cypress panicgrass, forked panicgrass
- Dichanthelium ensifolium (Baldwin ex Elliott) Gould – sword-leaf panicgrass
- Dichanthelium forbesii (Hitchc.) C.A. Clark & Gould
- Dichanthelium fusiforme (Hitchc.) Harvill
- Dichanthelium hebotes (Trin.) Zuloaga
- Dichanthelium heliophilum (Chase ex Zuloaga & Morrone) Zuloaga
- Dichanthelium hillebrandianum (Hitchc.) C.A.Clark & Gould – bog rosette grass
- Dichanthelium hirstii (Swallen) Kartesz – Hirst's panicgrass
- Dichanthelium implicatum (Scribn.) Kerguélen
- Dichanthelium isachnoides (Munro ex Hillebrand) C.A.Clark & Gould – Maui rosette grass
- Dichanthelium itatiaiae (Swallen) Zuloaga
- Dichanthelium joori (Vasey) Mohlenbr.
- Dichanthelium koolauense (H.St.John & Hosaka) C.A.Clark & Gould – Koolau rosette grass
- Dichanthelium lanuginosum (Elliott) Gould
- Dichanthelium latifolium (L.) Harvill – broadleaf rosette grass
- Dichanthelium laxiflorum (Lam.) Gould – openflower rosette grass, soft-tufted panicgrass
- Dichanthelium leibergii (Vasey) Freckmann – Leiberg's rosette grass
- Dichanthelium leucoblepharis (Trin.) Gould & C.A.Clark
- Dichanthelium lindheimeri (Nash) Gould
- Dichanthelium linearifolium (Scribn.) Gould – slimleaf rosette grass, linear-leaved panicgrass
- Dichanthelium lucidum (Ashe) LeBlond
- Dichanthelium macrospermum Gould
- Dichanthelium malacophyllum (Nash) Gould – softleaf rosette grass
- Dichanthelium mattamuskeetense (Ashe) Mohlenbr.
- Dichanthelium microcarpon (Muhl. ex Elliott) Mohlenbr.
- Dichanthelium nitidum (Lam.) Mohlenbr.
- Dichanthelium nodatum (Hitchc. & Chase) Gould – Sarita rosette grass
- Dichanthelium nudicaule (Vasey) B.F. Hansen & Wunderlin – naked-stemmed panicgrass
- Dichanthelium oligosanthes (Schult.) Gould – Heller's rosette grass, fewanther obscuregrass, few-flowered panicgrass
- Dichanthelium ovale (Elliott) Gould & C.A.Clark – eggleaf rosette grass, stiff-leaved panicgrass
- Dichanthelium pantrichum (Hack.) Davidse
- Dichanthelium pedicellatum (Vasey) Gould – cedar rosette grass, corm-based panicgrass
- Dichanthelium peristypum (Zuloaga & Morrone) Zuloaga
- Dichanthelium perlongum (Nash) Freckmann – long-stalked panicgrass
- Dichanthelium petropolitanum (Zuloaga & Morrone) Zuloaga
- Dichanthelium polyanthes (Schult.) Mohlenbr. – many-flowered panicgrass
- Dichanthelium portoricense (Desv. ex Ham.) B.F.Hansen & Wunderlin – blunt-glumed panicgrass
- Dichanthelium pycnoclados (Tutin) Davidse
- Dichanthelium ravenelii (Scribn. & Merr.) Gould – Ravenel's rosette grass
- Dichanthelium sabulorum (Lam.) Gould & C.A.Clark – hemlock rosette grass
- Dichanthelium scabriusculum (Elliott) Gould & C.A.Clark – woolly rosette grass, tall-swamp panicgrass
- Dichanthelium sciurotis (Trin.) Davidse
- Dichanthelium sciurotoides (Zuloaga & Morrone) Davidse
- Dichanthelium scoparioides (Ashe) Mohlenbr.
- Dichanthelium scoparium (Lam.) Gould – velvet panicum
- Dichanthelium scribnerianum (Nash) Gould
- Dichanthelium sendulskyii (Zuloaga & Morrone) Zuloaga
- Dichanthelium sphaerocarpon (Elliott) Gould – roundseed panicgrass, round-fruited panicgrass
- Dichanthelium sphagnicola (Nash) LeBlond
- Dichanthelium stigmosum (Trin.) Zuloaga
- Dichanthelium stipiflorum (Renvoize) Zuloaga
- Dichanthelium strigosum (Muhl. ex Elliott) Freckmann – roughhair rosette grass, cushion-tuft panicgrass
- Dichanthelium superatum (Hack.) Zuloaga
- Dichanthelium surrectum (Chase ex Zuloaga & Morrone) Zuloaga
- Dichanthelium telmatum (Swallen) Zuloaga
- Dichanthelium umbonulatum (Swallen) Davidse
- Dichanthelium viscidellum (Scribn.) Gould
- Dichanthelium wilcoxianum (Vasey) Freckmann – fall rosette grass, Wilcox's panicgrass
- Dichanthelium xalapense Kunth
- Dichanthelium xanthophysum (A. Gray) Freckmann – slender rosette grass, pale panicgrass
- Dichanthelium yadkinense (Ashe) Mohlenbr.
