= Frank W. Gould =

American agrostologist and botanist

- Born: 1913
- Died: 1981 (aged 67–68)
- Education: Northern Illinois Teachers College (B.E.); University of Wisconsin (M.S.); University of California, Berkeley (Ph.D.)
- Known for: Vegetation regions of Texas; Grass systematics research Curator of S.M. Tracy Herbarium
- Spouse: Lucile Gould Bridges
- Scientific career
- Fields: Agrostology, Botany, Plant taxonomy
- Workplaces: Texas A&M University; University of Arizona; Compton Junior College; Dixie Junior College
- Doctoral advisor: Lincoln Constance

Frank Walton Gould (1913–1981) was an American agrostologist and botanist who was considered the preeminent U.S. agrostologist from the 1950s until his death in 1981. He made significant contributions to the understanding and classification of grasses, particularly those of the southwestern United States and Texas.

== Biography ==
=== Education ===
Gould received his Bachelor of Education from Northern Illinois Teachers College, his Master of Science from the University of Wisconsin, and his Ph.D. from the University of California, Berkeley, where he studied under Lincoln Constance.

=== Career ===
Gould taught at several institutions throughout his career, including Dixie Junior College, Compton Junior College, and the University of Arizona. He concluded his academic career at Texas A&M University, where he served as a distinguished professor and earned emeritus status.

In 1949, Gould was appointed associate professor in the Range and Forestry department at Texas A&M University and curator of the museum, with his main responsibility being the S.M. Tracy Herbarium. During his 31-year tenure, he built the herbarium into an internationally respected source of plant taxonomy material. He is recognized as an important collector for the S.M. Tracy Herbarium.

== Major contributions ==
=== Vegetation regions of Texas ===
One of Gould's most enduring contributions was his development of vegetation regions (ecoregions) of Texas, which are still widely utilized across the state, including by the Texas Parks and Wildlife Department. His ecoregions map, originally published in Texas Plants – A Checklist and Ecological Summary (1975), has been digitized and is available through GIS layers.

=== Research focus ===
Gould's research focused on several grass genera, including Elymus, Andropogon, Bouteloua, Panicum, and Dichanthelium. His systematic work on these genera helped establish modern understanding of grass taxonomy in North America.

== Publications ==
Gould authored numerous influential books on grasses, many of which remain standard references in the field:

- Grasses of the Southwestern US (1951)
- Texas Plants—A Checklist and Ecological Summary (1962)
- Grasses of the Texas Coastal Bend (with Thadis Box, 1965)
- Grass Systematics (1968, revised 2000) ISBN 978-0-89096-153-7
- Grasses of Texas (1975, revised 2000) ISBN 978-1-58544-006-1
- Common Texas Grasses: An Illustrated Guide (with Stephen L. Hatch, 1979) ISBN 978-0-89096-058-5
- A Key to the Genera of Mexican Grasses (1979)
- The Grasses of Baja California, Mexico (with Reid Moran, 1981)

Several of his books are listed as recommended reading by the Native Plant Society of Texas.

== Legacy ==
Gould's influence extended through his many doctoral students, including Kelly Allred, Lynn Clark, Stephen L. Hatch, Zarir Kapadia, Robert Lonard, Floyd Waller, Robert Webster, Jose Valls, and Arshad Ali, who have made significant contributions to systematics. Their students continue this tradition in agrostology and grass systematics.

The Frank W. Gould Award for Graduate Research Support in Plant Systematics, administered by the Texas A&M Development Foundation, was established in his honor.

== Personal life ==
Gould was married to Lucile Gould Bridges for 40 years.
