= Glume =

One of two bracts enclosing a flower spikelet in grasses

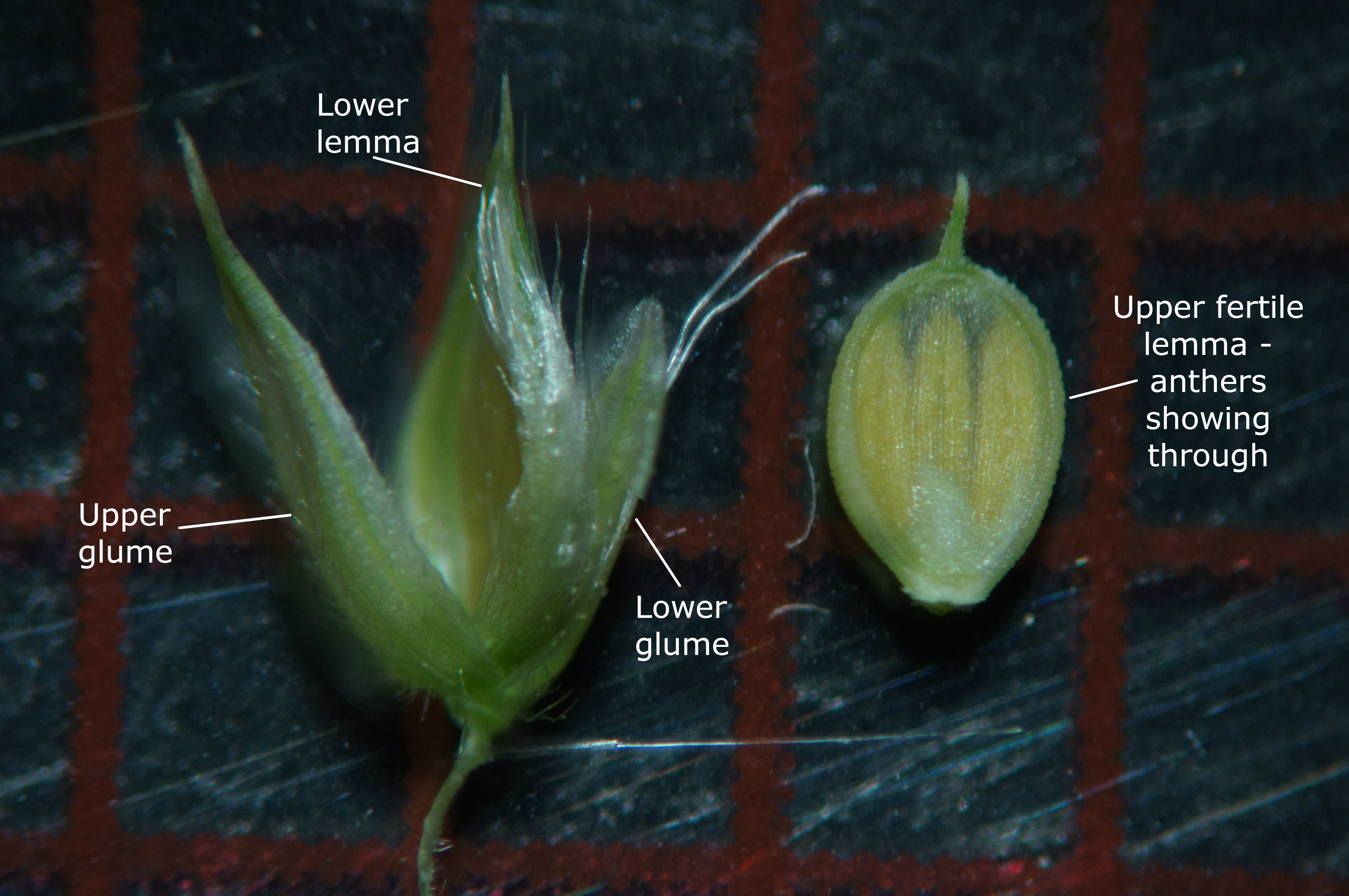
Upper and lower glumes of Urochloa mosambicensis, a grass

In botany, a glume is a bract (leaf-like structure) below a spikelet in the inflorescence (flower cluster) of grasses (Poaceae) or the flowers of sedges (Cyperaceae). There are two other types of bracts in the spikelets of grasses: the lemma and palea.

In grasses, two bracts known as "glumes" form the lowermost organs of a spikelet (there are usually two but one is sometimes reduced; or rarely, both are absent). Glumes may be similar in form to the lemmas, the bracts at the base of each floret.

In sedges, by contrast, a glume is a scale at the base of each flower in a spikelet.
