= List of Paspalum species =

The following species in the grass genus Paspalum are accepted by Plants of the World Online. Species are somewhat difficult to delineate by traditional morphological methods.

== List ==
- Paspalum aberrans (Döll) Morrone & Zuloaga
- Paspalum achlysophilum (Soderstr.) S.Denham
- Paspalum acuminatum Raddi
- Paspalum acutifolium León
- Paspalum acutum Chase
- Paspalum adoperiens (E.Fourn.) Chase
- Paspalum affine Steud.
- Paspalum albidulum Henrard
- Paspalum alcalinum Mez
- Paspalum almum Chase
- Paspalum alterniflorum A.Rich.
- Paspalum altsonii Chase
- Paspalum ammodes Trin.
- Paspalum amphicarpum Ekman
- Paspalum anderssonii Mez
- Paspalum apiculatum Döll
- Paspalum approximatum Döll
- Paspalum arenarium Schrad.
- Paspalum arsenei Chase
- Paspalum arundinaceum Poir.
- Paspalum arundinellum Mez
- Paspalum aspidiotes Trin.
- Paspalum atabapense Davidse & Zuloaga
- Paspalum atratum Swallen
- Paspalum auricomum (A.G.Burm.) S.Denham
- Paspalum axillare Swallen
- Paspalum azuayense Sohns
- Paspalum bakeri Hack.
- Paspalum barbinode Hack.
- Paspalum barclayi Chase
- Paspalum batianoffii B.K.Simon
- Paspalum bertonii Hack.
- Paspalum biaristatum Filg. & Davidse
- Paspalum bifidifolium Soderstr.
- Paspalum bifidum (Bertol.) Nash
- Paspalum blodgettii Chapm.
- Paspalum bonairense Henrard
- Paspalum bonplandianum Flüggé
- Paspalum botterii (E.Fourn.) Chase
- Paspalum brachytrichum Hack.
- Paspalum breve Chase
- Paspalum buchtienii Hack.
- Paspalum burchellii Munro ex Oliv.
- Paspalum burmanii Filg., Morrone & Zuloaga
- Paspalum cachimboense Davidse, Morrone, Zuloaga
- Paspalum caespitosum Flüggé
- Paspalum campinarum Filg. & Davidse
- Paspalum campylostachyum (Hack.) S.Denham
- Paspalum canarae (Steud.) Veldkamp
- Paspalum candidum (Humb. & Bonpl. ex Flüggé) Kunth
- Paspalum cangarum C.O.Moura, P.L.Viana & R.C.Oliveira
- Paspalum capillifolium Nash
- Paspalum carajasense S.Denham
- Paspalum carinatum Flüggé
- Paspalum centrale Chase
- Paspalum ceresia (Kuntze) Chase
- Paspalum cerradoense R.C.Oliveira & Valls
- Paspalum chacoense Parodi
- Paspalum chaffanjonii Maury
- Paspalum chaseanum Parodi
- Paspalum chiapense Sánchez-Ken
- Paspalum chilense Catanzaro & G.H.Rua
- Paspalum cinerascens (Döll) A.G.Burm. & M.Bastos
- Paspalum clandestinum Swallen
- Paspalum clavuliferum C.Wright
- Paspalum clipeum G.H.Rua, Valls, Graciano-Ribeiro & R.C.Oliveira
- Paspalum comasii Catasús
- Paspalum commune Lillo
- Paspalum compressifolium Swallen
- Paspalum conduplicatum Canto-Dorow, Valls & Longhi-Wagner
- Paspalum conjugatum P.J.Bergius
- Paspalum conspersum Schrad.
- Paspalum convexum Flüggé
- Paspalum corcovadense Raddi
- Paspalum cordaense Swallen
- Paspalum cordatum Hack.
- Paspalum coryphaeum Trin.
- Paspalum costaricense Mez
- Paspalum costellatum Swallen
- Paspalum crassum Chase ex Hitchc.
- Paspalum crinitum Chase ex Hitchc.
- Paspalum crispatum Hack.
- Paspalum crispulum Swallen
- Paspalum cromyorhizon Trin. ex Döll
- Paspalum crucense (Killeen) S.Denham
- Paspalum crustarium Swallen
- Paspalum culiacanum Vasey
- Paspalum cultratum (Trin.) S.Denham
- Paspalum curassavicum Chase
- Paspalum cymbiforme E.Fourn.
- Paspalum dasypleurum Kunze ex É.Desv.
- Paspalum dasytrichum Dusén ex Swallen
- Paspalum decumbens Sw.
- Paspalum dedeccae Quarín
- Paspalum delavayi Henrard
- Paspalum delicatum Swallen
- Paspalum densum Poir.
- Paspalum denticulatum Trin.
- Paspalum dilatatum Poir.
- Paspalum dispar Chase
- Paspalum dissectum (L.) L.
- Paspalum distachyon Poir. ex Trin.
- Paspalum distichum L.
- Paspalum distortum Chase
- Paspalum divergens Döll
- Paspalum durifolium Mez
- Paspalum edmondii León
- Paspalum eglume Morrone & Zuloaga
- Paspalum ekmanianum Henrard
- Paspalum ellipticum Döll
- Paspalum equitans Mez
- Paspalum erectum Chase
- Paspalum erianthoides Lindm.
- Paspalum erianthum Nees ex Trin.
- Paspalum eucomum Nees ex Trin.
- Paspalum exaltatum J.Presl
- Paspalum expansum Döll
- Paspalum falcatum Nees ex Steud.
- Paspalum fasciculatum Willd. ex Flüggé
- Paspalum filgueirasii Morrone & Zuloaga
- Paspalum filifolium Nees ex Steud.
- Paspalum filiforme Sw.
- Paspalum fimbriatum Kunth
- Paspalum flaccidum Nees
- Paspalum flavescens (Roseng., B.R.Arrill. & Izag.) P.R.Speranza & G.H.Rua
- Paspalum flavum J.Presl
- Paspalum floridanum Michx.
- Paspalum foliiforme S.Denham
- Paspalum forsterianum Flüggé
- Paspalum galapageium Chase
- Paspalum gardnerianum Nees
- Paspalum geminiflorum Steud.
- Paspalum giuliettiae Pimenta, G.H.Rua & R.C.Oliveira
- Paspalum glabrinode (Hack.) Morrone & Zuloaga
- Paspalum glaucescens Hack.
- Paspalum glaziovii (A.G.Burm.) S.Denham
- Paspalum glumaceum Clayton
- Paspalum goyanum Swallen
- Paspalum goyasense Davidse, Morrone, Zuloaga
- Paspalum gracielae Sulekic
- Paspalum graniticum (A.G.Burm.) S.Denham
- Paspalum guaricense Swallen
- Paspalum guayanerum Beetle
- Paspalum guenoarum Arechav.
- Paspalum guttatum Trin.
- Paspalum haenkeanum J.Presl
- Paspalum hallasanense Y.N.Lee
- Paspalum hartwegianum E.Fourn.
- Paspalum hatschbachii Zuloaga & Morrone
- Paspalum haumanii Parodi
- Paspalum heterotrichon Trin.
- Paspalum hintonii Chase
- Paspalum hirsutum Retz.
- Paspalum hirtum Kunth
- Paspalum hispidum Swallen
- Paspalum hitchcockii Chase
- Paspalum huberi S.Denham
- Paspalum humboldtianum Flüggé
- Paspalum hyalinum Nees ex Trin.
- Paspalum imbricatum Filg.
- Paspalum inaequivalve Raddi
- Paspalum inconstans Chase
- Paspalum indecorum Mez
- Paspalum insulare Ekman
- Paspalum intermedium Munro ex Morong
- Paspalum ionanthum Chase
- Paspalum itaboense Catasús
- Paspalum jaliscanum Chase ex Hitchc.
- Paspalum jesuiticum Parodi
- Paspalum jimenezii Chase
- Paspalum juergensii Hack.
- Paspalum killipii (Hitchc.) Zuloaga & Soderstr.
- Paspalum lachneum Nees ex Steud.
- Paspalum lacustre Chase ex Swallen
- Paspalum laeve Michx.
- Paspalum lamprocaryon K.Schum.
- Paspalum lanciflorum Trin.
- Paspalum langei (E.Fourn.) Nash
- Paspalum latipes Swallen
- Paspalum laurentii R.C.Oliveira & Valls
- Paspalum laxum Lam.
- Paspalum lentiginosum J.Presl
- Paspalum leptachne Chase
- Paspalum lepton Schult.
- Paspalum ligulare Nees
- Paspalum lilloi Hack.
- Paspalum limbatum Henrard
- Paspalum lindenianum A.Rich.
- Paspalum lineare Trin.
- Paspalum loefgrenii Ekman
- Paspalum longiaristatum Davidse & Filg.
- Paspalum longicuspe Nash
- Paspalum longipedicellatum R.C.Oliveira & Valls
- Paspalum longum Chase
- Paspalum luxurians R.Guzmán & L.Rico
- Paspalum macranthecium Parodi
- Paspalum macrophyllum Kunth
- Paspalum maculosum Trin.
- Paspalum madorense Renvoize
- Paspalum malacophyllum Trin.
- Paspalum malmeanum Ekman
- Paspalum mandiocanum Trin.
- Paspalum maritimum Trin.
- Paspalum marmoratum Kuhlm.
- Paspalum mayanum Chase
- Paspalum melanospermum Desv. ex Poir.
- Paspalum microstachyum J.Presl
- Paspalum millegranum Schrad.
- Paspalum minarum Hack.
- Paspalum minus E.Fourn.
- Paspalum minutispiculatum P.A.Reis, R.C.Oliveira & Valls
- Paspalum modestum Mez
- Paspalum molle Poir.
- Paspalum monostachyum Vasey ex Chapm.
- Paspalum morichalense Davidse, Zuloaga & Filg.
- Paspalum mosquitiense (Davidse & A.G.Burm.) S.Denham
- Paspalum motembense León
- Paspalum multicaule Poir.
- Paspalum multinodum B.K.Simon
- Paspalum mutabile Chase
- Paspalum nanum C.Wright ex Griseb.
- Paspalum nelsonii Chase
- Paspalum nesiotes Chase
- Paspalum niquelandiae Filg.
- Paspalum notatum Flüggé
- Paspalum nudatum Luces
- Paspalum nummularium Chase ex Send.& A.G.Burm.
- Paspalum nutans Lam.
- Paspalum oligostachyum Salzm. ex Steud.
- Paspalum orbiculare G.Forst.
- Paspalum orbiculatum Poir.
- Paspalum oreophilum (A.G.Burm.) S.Denham
- Paspalum oteroi Swallen
- Paspalum ovale Nees ex Steud.
- Paspalum pallens Swallen
- Paspalum pallidum Kunth
- Paspalum palmeri Chase
- Paspalum palustre Mez
- Paspalum paniculatum L.
- Paspalum parviflorum Rhode ex Flüggé
- Paspalum parvulum (A.G.Burm.) S.Denham
- Paspalum pauciciliatum (Parodi) Herter
- Paspalum paucifolium Swallen
- Paspalum peckii F.T.Hubb.
- Paspalum pectinatum Nees
- Paspalum penicillatum Hook.f.
- Paspalum petilum Chase
- Paspalum petrense A.G.Burm.
- Paspalum petrosum Swallen
- Paspalum phaeotrichum Valls, G.H.Rua, Graciano-Ribeiro & R.C.Oliveira
- Paspalum phyllorhachis Hack.
- Paspalum pictum Ekman
- Paspalum pilgerianum Chase
- Paspalum pilosum Lam.
- Paspalum pisinnum Swallen
- Paspalum planum Hack.
- Paspalum plenum Chase
- Paspalum plicatulum Michx.
- Paspalum plowmanii Morrone & Zuloaga
- Paspalum plurinerve Quarín, Valls & V.C.Rosso
- Paspalum polyphyllum Nees ex Trin.
- Paspalum praecox Walter
- Paspalum procerum S.Denham
- Paspalum procurrens Quarín
- Paspalum prodigiosum Sánchez-Ken
- Paspalum prostratum Scribn. & Merr.
- Paspalum pubiflorum Rupr. ex E.Fourn.
- Paspalum pulchellum Kunth
- Paspalum pumilum Nees
- Paspalum pygmaeum Hack.
- Paspalum quadrifarium Lam.
- Paspalum quarinii Morrone & Zuloaga
- Paspalum racemosum Lam.
- Paspalum ramboi I.L.Barreto
- Paspalum rawitscheri (Parodi) Chase ex G.H.Rua & Valls
- Paspalum reclinatum Chase
- Paspalum rectum Nees
- Paspalum redondense Swallen
- Paspalum reduncum Nees ex Steud.
- Paspalum regnellii Mez
- Paspalum remotum Remy
- Paspalum repandum (Nees) G.H.Rua & Valls
- Paspalum repens P.J.Bergius
- Paspalum reptatum Hitchc. & Chase
- Paspalum restingense Renvoize
- Paspalum reticulinerve Renvoize
- Paspalum riedelii Mez
- Paspalum riparium Nees
- Paspalum robustum (Hitchc. & Chase) S.Denham
- Paspalum rocanum León
- Paspalum rostratum D.M.Ramos, Valls & R.C.Oliveira
- Paspalum rottboellioides C.Wright
- Paspalum rufum Nees ex Steud.
- Paspalum rugulosum Morrone & Zuloaga
- Paspalum rupestre Trin.
- Paspalum rupium Renvoize
- Paspalum saccharoides Nees ex Trin.
- Paspalum saugetii Chase
- Paspalum saurae (Parodi) Parodi
- Paspalum scalare Trin.
- Paspalum scandens Tutin
- Paspalum schesslii Bonasora & G.H.Rua
- Paspalum schultesii Swallen
- Paspalum schumannii (Pilg.) S.Denham
- Paspalum scrobiculatum L.
- Paspalum scutatum Nees ex Trin.
- Paspalum seminudum (A.G.Burm.) S.Denham
- Paspalum serpentinum Hochst. ex Steud.
- Paspalum setaceum Michx.
- Paspalum setosum (Swallen) S.Denham
- Paspalum simplex Morong
- Paspalum sodiroanum Hack.
- Paspalum soukupii E.Carbono
- Paspalum sparsum Chase
- Paspalum squamulatum E.Fourn.
- Paspalum stagnophilum Morrone & Zuloaga
- Paspalum standleyi Chase
- Paspalum stellatum Flüggé
- Paspalum strigosum Döll ex Chase
- Paspalum subciliatum Chase
- Paspalum subfalcatum (Döll) Tutin
- Paspalum subsesquiglume Döll
- Paspalum sumatrense Roth
- Paspalum telmatum Swallen
- Paspalum tenellum Willd.
- Paspalum thrasyoides (Trin.) S.Denham
- Paspalum thunbergii Kunth
- Paspalum tillettii Davidse & Zuloaga
- Paspalum tinctum Chase
- Paspalum tolucense R.Guzmán
- Paspalum torrense I.L.Barreto ex Valls & V.C.Rosso
- Paspalum trachycoleon Steud.
- Paspalum trianae Pilg.
- Paspalum trichophyllum Henrard
- Paspalum trichostomum Hack.
- Paspalum trinii Swallen
- Paspalum trinitense (Mez) S.Denham
- Paspalum tuberosum Mez
- Paspalum turriforme R.W.Pohl
- Paspalum umbrosum Trin.
- Paspalum unispicatum (Scribn. & Merr.) Nash
- Paspalum urbanianum Ekman
- Paspalum urvillei Steud.
- Paspalum usterii Hack.
- Paspalum uyucense R.W.Pohl
- Paspalum vacarianum Valls & V.C.Rosso
- Paspalum vaginatum Sw.
- Paspalum variabile (E.Fourn.) Nash
- Paspalum veredense G.H.Rua, R.C.Oliveira, Valls & Graciano-Ribeiro
- Paspalum vexillarium G.H.Rua, Valls, Graciano-Ribeiro & R.C.Oliveira
- Paspalum virgatum L.
- Paspalum virletii E.Fourn.
- Paspalum volcanense Zuloaga, Morrone & S.Denham
- Paspalum wrightii Hitchc. & Chase
- Paspalum yecorae Sánchez-Ken
- Paspalum zuloagae Davidse & Filg.
