= Ceresia =

Ceresia may refer to:

- Ceresia Pers. a plant genus now known as Paspalum
- Ceresia (katydid) Uvarov, 1928, a katydid genus with a single species, Ceresia pulchripes
