= Azorhizophilus paspali =

Scientific classification
- Domain: Bacteria
- Kingdom: Pseudomonadati
- Phylum: Pseudomonadota
- Class: Gammaproteobacteria
- Order: Pseudomonadales
- Family: Pseudomonadaceae
- Genus: Azorhizophilus
- Species: A. paspali

Binomial name
- Azorhizophilus paspali (Döbereiner 1966) Thompson and Skerman 1981

Type strain
- ATCC 23833, Ax-8, AX-8A, AZ-8A, CCUG 53674, CECT 4095, D&#246, Dobereiner Ax-8, DSM 2283, DSMZ 2283, IAM 12667, ICMP 7469, JCM 20726, LMG 3864, NBRC 102228, NCAIM B.01794, NCIB 12095, NCIMB 12095, NRRL B-14628, WR-129, WR-136

Synonyms
- Azotobacter paspali

Species of bacterium

Azorhizophilus paspali is a bacterium from the genus of Azorhizophilus which has been isolated from rhizosphere soil from the plant Paspalum notatum in Brazil.
