= Camalote =

Camalote may refer to:

- Camalote, Belize, a village in Cayo District, Belize
- Paspalum plicatulum, a species of grass
