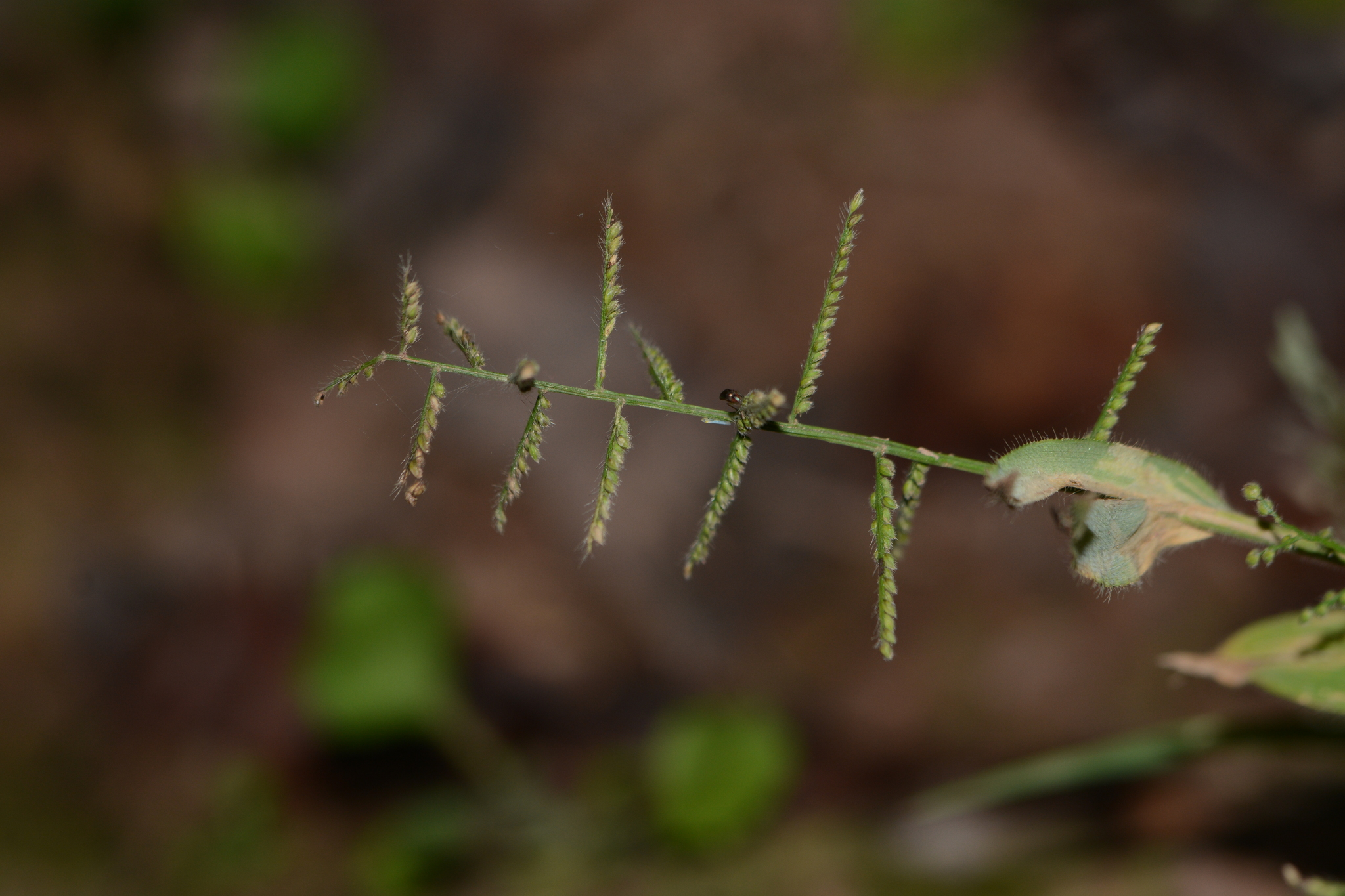

Conservation status
- Least Concern (IUCN 3.1)

Scientific classification
- Kingdom: Plantae
- Clade: Tracheophytes
- Clade: Angiosperms
- Clade: Monocots
- Clade: Commelinids
- Order: Poales
- Family: Poaceae
- Subfamily: Panicoideae
- Genus: Paspalum
- Species: P. canarae

Binomial name
- Paspalum canarae (Steud.) Veldkamp

Synonyms
- Panicum canarae Steud.; Paspalum canarae fimbriatum (Bor) Veldkamp; Paspalum compactum var. fimbriatum Bor; Paspalum costatum Hochst. ex Steud., pro syn.; Paspalum miliaria Müll.Hal.

= Paspalum canarae =

Species of grass

Paspalum canarae is a species of grass native to the Western Ghats region of India. It is also known as the canara paspalum.

== Description ==
Paspalum canarae is an annual grass and is characterized by trailing stems, hairy nodes, and ovate, densely hairy leaves. It bears small flowers in 8–15 racemes, with spikelets usually paired at the base of the raceme. The upper glume is elliptic and hairless, measuring about 1 x 0.5 mm.

== Range ==
Paspalum canarae is native to the Western Ghats; the report from Madhya Pradesh is considered doubtful.

== Habitat and ecology ==
Paspalum canarae is terrestrial, and is common in moist areas during the monsoons. It is reported to grow in many moist and marshy habitats in open sunny grass dominated areas. The flowering period is August to October.

== Taxonomy ==
Paspalum canarae contains the following subspecies:

- Paspalum canarae fimbriatum
