= Azorhizophilus =

Scientific classification
- Domain: Bacteria
- Kingdom: Pseudomonadati
- Phylum: Pseudomonadota
- Class: Gammaproteobacteria
- Order: Pseudomonadales
- Family: Pseudomonadaceae
- Genus: Azorhizophilus; Thompson and Skerman 1981

Type species
- Azorhizophilus paspali

Species
- A. paspali

Genus of bacteria

Azorhizophilus is a genus from the family of Pseudomonadaceae, with one known species (Azorhizophilus paspali).
