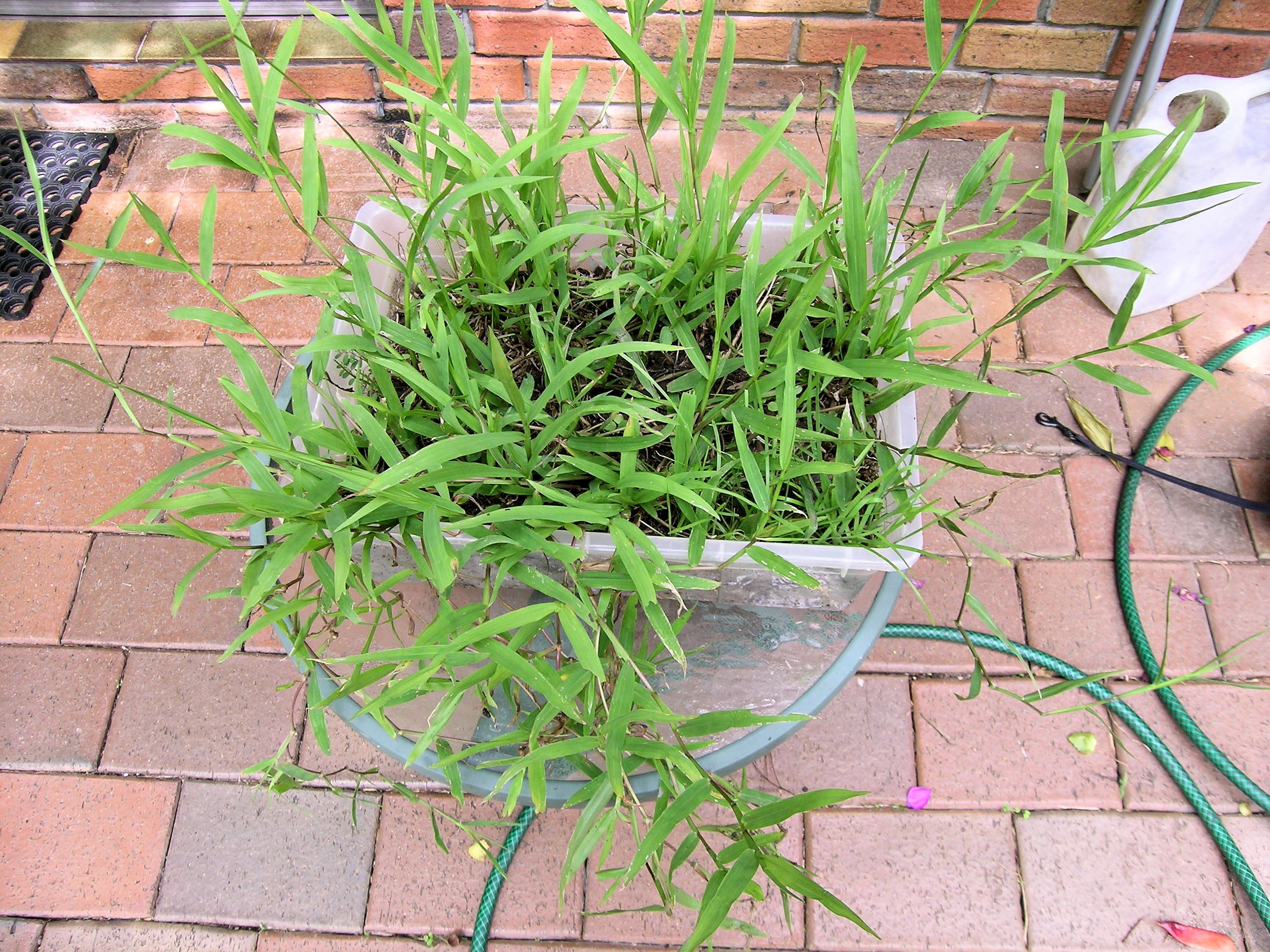
- Paspalum conjugatum habit
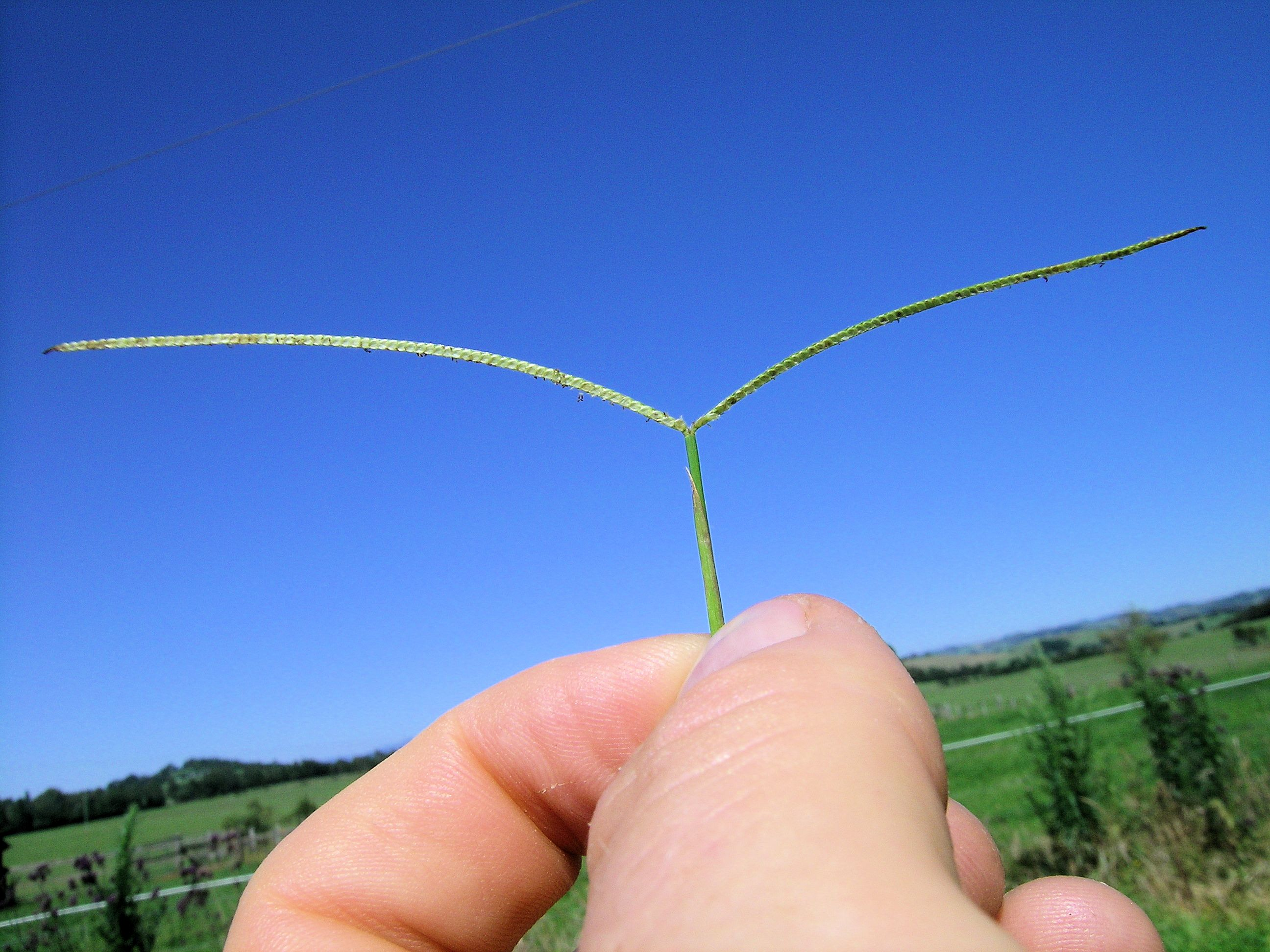
- The characteristic T-shaped panicle of P. conjugatum

Scientific classification
- Kingdom: Plantae
- Clade: Tracheophytes
- Clade: Angiosperms
- Clade: Monocots
- Clade: Commelinids
- Order: Poales
- Family: Poaceae
- Subfamily: Panicoideae
- Genus: Paspalum
- Species: P. conjugatum

Binomial name
- Paspalum conjugatum P.J.Bergius

= Paspalum conjugatum =

Species of plant

Paspalum conjugatum, commonly known as carabao grass or hilo grass, is a tropical to subtropical perennial grass. It is originally from the American tropics, but has been naturalized widely in tropical Southeast Asia and Pacific Islands. It has also spread to Northern Africa and Northern Eastern Australia, and New Zealand. It is also known as sour paspalum, T-grass (after the shape of their panicle), or more confusingly, as "buffalo grass" or "sour grass".

== Taxonomy ==
Paspalum conjugatum belongs to the genus Paspalum (bahiagrasses or crown grasses) in the grass family Poaceae. It was first described in 1772 in by the Swedish botanist Peter Jonas Bergius.

== Distribution ==
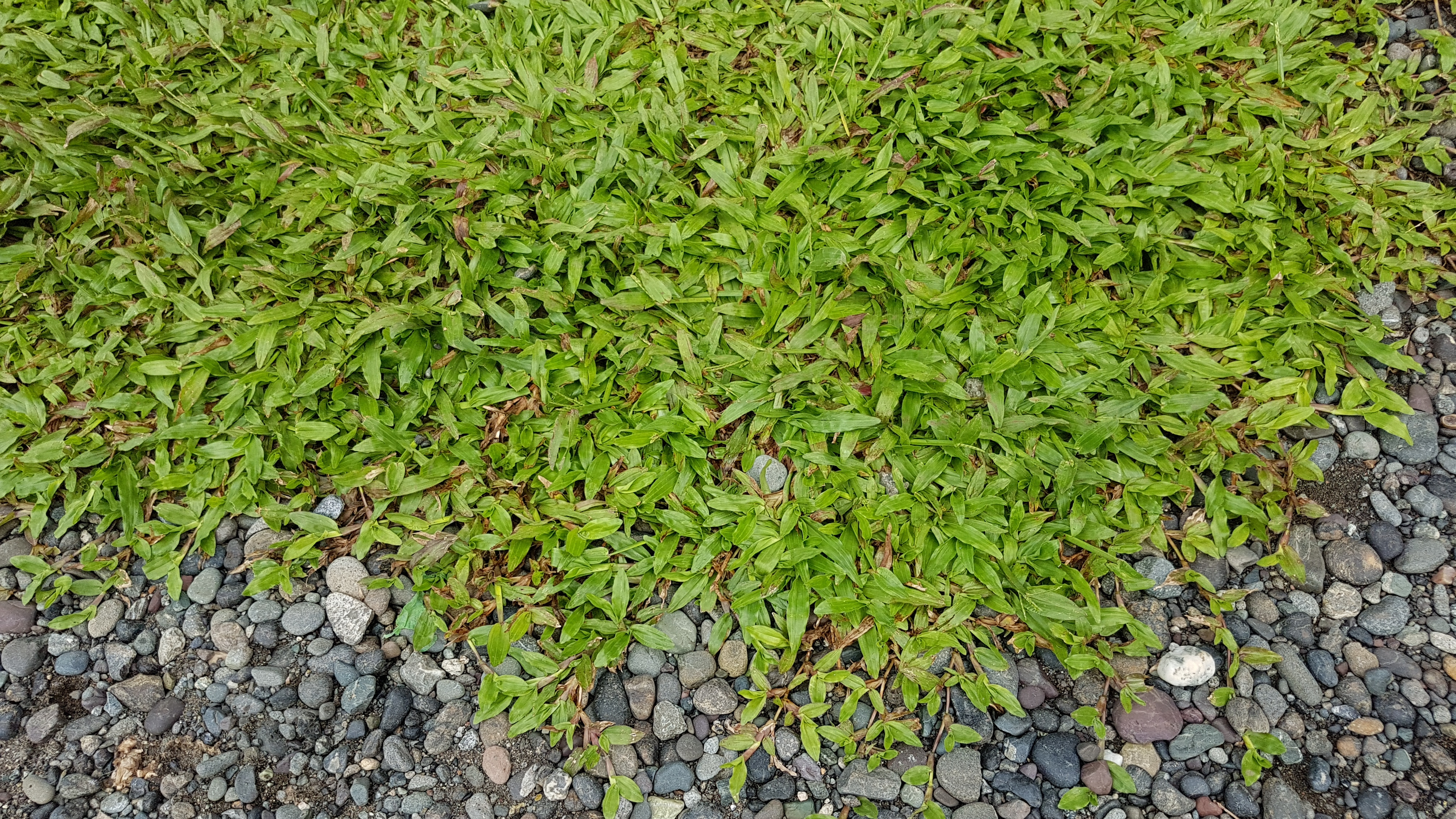
Paspalum conjugatum can be grown as a lawn grass if kept cropped and low to the ground

Paspalum conjugatum is native to the tropics of the Americas. It was introduced to tropical Southeast Asia and the Pacific Islands during the colonial period. It is particularly abundant in the Philippines from where the English common name "carabao grass" originates (named after the carabao, the local water buffalo breed); and in Hawaii where it is known as "hilo grass". They have also spread to Northern Africa and Northern and Eastern Australia. In New Zealand, P. conjugatum is naturalised in 1977, and is found on the Kermadec Islands, and in one location on the mainland (near Rotorua).

== Description ==
Paspalum conjugatum has a creeping stoloniferous habit. The culms are branching and slightly compressed dorsoventrally, they are usually reddish to purplish in color. The leaf sheaths are strongly flattened, usually 30 to 50 mm (1.2 to 2.0 in) long and hairy around the nodes. The leaves are smooth, around 8 to 20 cm (3.1 to 7.9 in) in length, and 5 to 12 mm (0.20 to 0.47 in) in width. They are linear to lance-like in shape, tapering to a point. The inflorescence are characteristically T-shaped, with two (rarely three) racemes.

== Biology ==
They flower approximately 4 to 5 weeks after germination and continue flowering year-round. They rarely germinate from seed. Instead they usually propagate via stolons.

== Ecology and uses ==
Paspalum conjugatum grow from sea level to around 1,700 m (5,600 ft) in altitude. They commonly grow near riparian and disturbed habitats.

They are usually unpalatable to cattle, especially in the flowering stage. When grown for forage, they are usually closely cropped continually, to maintain palatability. It is, however, suitable forage for water buffalos, hence its common names "carabao grass" or "buffalo grass". They can be a serious weed among agricultural crops. They are also grown as lawn grass.

== See also ==
- Paspalum notatum
