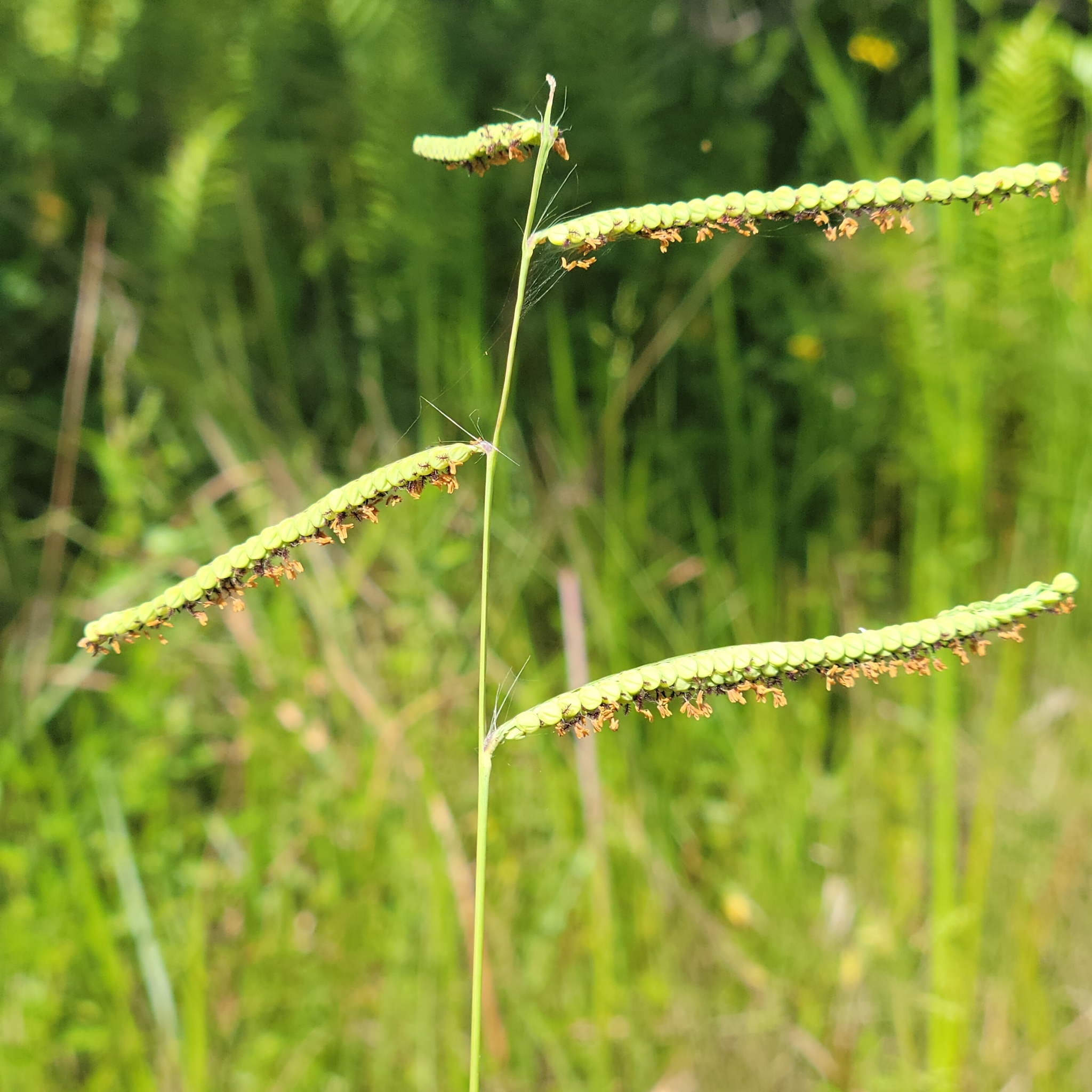

Scientific classification
- Kingdom: Plantae
- Clade: Tracheophytes
- Clade: Angiosperms
- Clade: Monocots
- Clade: Commelinids
- Order: Poales
- Family: Poaceae
- Subfamily: Panicoideae
- Genus: Paspalum
- Species: P. praecox

Binomial name
- Paspalum praecox Walter

Synonyms
- List: Paspalum amplum Nash; Paspalum curtisianum Steud.; Paspalum glaberrimum Nash; Paspalum kearneyi Nash; Paspalum lanuginosum P.Beauv.; Paspalum lanuginosum Willd.; Paspalum lanuginosum Willd. ex Steud.; Paspalum lentiferum Lam.; Paspalum praecox var. curtisianum (Steud.) Vasey; Paspalum praecox var. praecox Walter; Paspalum tardum Nash

= Paspalum praecox =

Species of flowering plant

Paspalum praecox, commonly known as early paspalum, early crown grass, or Curtis's crown grass, is a species of perennial grass found in North America. There are two variations: P. praecox var. curtisianum and P. praecox var. praecox.

== Description ==
The stems stand erect, reaching a height between 60 and 90 cm (2 and 3 ft). This species's blades possess a scaberulous margin and may reach up to 20 cm (8 in) in length and 1.5 to 4 mm (0.06 to 0.16 in).

Individuals may have 3 to 5 racemes, each reaching a length between 2 and 6 cm (0.8 and 2.4 in). Spikelets are obovoid to suborbicular in shape, and are relatively flat. They occur in 4 rows, ranging between 2.2 and 3.2 mm (0.09 and 0.13 in) in length. The pedicels are 0.1 to 1.1 mm (0.004 to 0.043 in) in length. When grain is produced it is brown in color, reaching a length of 2 mm (0.08 in).

The two variations may be distinguished from one another via the texture of their lower sheaths. The texture of var. curtisianum is hirsute, while var. praecox is glabrous.

== Distribution and habitat ==
Paspalum praecox occurs primarily within the southeastern region of the United States, its range stretching from Virginia to Florida and westward to Texas. There is a disjunct population in Illinois. This species can also be found in Cuba.

Throughout its range, P. praecox is considered to be an obligate or facultative wetland hydrophytic species.

This species may be found in habitats such as pine savannas, seepages, swamps, and wet woods.
