= Paspalum bifidum =

Scientific classification
- Kingdom: Plantae
- Clade: Tracheophytes
- Clade: Angiosperms
- Clade: Monocots
- Clade: Commelinids
- Order: Poales
- Family: Poaceae
- Subfamily: Panicoideae
- Genus: Paspalum
- Species: P. bifidum

Binomial name
- Paspalum bifidum (Bertol.) Nash

Species of flowering plant

Paspalum bifidum, commonly known as pitchfork paspalum or pitchfork crown grass, is a species of perennial grass found in the United States. They are considered to be important grasses for foraging.

== Description ==
Paspalum bifidum possesses primarily basal leaves that may reach a length up to 20 cm (8 in) with ciliate margins. Stems are between 60 and 90 cm (24 and 35 in) in height and range in width between 3 and 15 mm (0.12 and 0.59 in).

When inflorescence occurs, most commonly from August to October, blooms are white to brown in coloration.

== Distribution and habitat ==
This species' range encompasses the southeastern region of the United States, stretching from Virginia to Florida and westward to eastern Texas and southeastern Oklahoma.

P. bifidum is considered to be a facultative wetland species, and can be found in habitats such as longleaf pine savannas, sandy woodlands, and other habitats with dry to mesic soils.
