= Paspalum soboliferum =

Conservation status
- Endangered (IUCN 3.1)

Scientific classification
- Kingdom: Plantae
- Clade: Tracheophytes
- Clade: Angiosperms
- Clade: Monocots
- Clade: Commelinids
- Order: Poales
- Family: Poaceae
- Subfamily: Panicoideae
- Genus: Paspalum
- Species: P. soboliferum

Binomial name
- Paspalum soboliferum Chase

Species of grass

Paspalum soboliferum is a species of grass in the family Poaceae. It is found only in Ecuador.
