= Paspalum rugulosum =

Conservation status
- Vulnerable (IUCN 3.1)

Scientific classification
- Kingdom: Plantae
- Clade: Tracheophytes
- Clade: Angiosperms
- Clade: Monocots
- Clade: Commelinids
- Order: Poales
- Family: Poaceae
- Subfamily: Panicoideae
- Genus: Paspalum
- Species: P. rugulosum

Binomial name
- Paspalum rugulosum Morrone & Zuloaga

Species of grass

Paspalum rugulosum is a species of grass in the family Poaceae. It is found only in Ecuador.
