= Paspalum pubiflorum =

Scientific classification
- Kingdom: Plantae
- Clade: Tracheophytes
- Clade: Angiosperms
- Clade: Monocots
- Clade: Commelinids
- Order: Poales
- Family: Poaceae
- Subfamily: Panicoideae
- Genus: Paspalum
- Species: P. pubiflorum

Binomial name
- Paspalum pubiflorum Rupr. ex E.Fourn.

Synonyms
- List: Paspalum geminum Nash; Paspalum hallii Vasey & Scribn.; Paspalum laeviglume Scribn.; Paspalum planifolium E.Fourn.; Paspalum pubiflorum var. glabrum Scribn.; Paspalum pubiflorum var. glaucum (Scribn.) Scribn.; Paspalum pubiflorum var. viride E.Fourn.; Paspalum remotum var. glabrum Vasey; Paspalum remotum var. glaucum Scribn.

Species of plant

Paspalum pubiflorum, the hairyseed paspalum, is a species of flowering plant in the panicgrass subfamily Panicoideae. It is native to warmer, wetter parts of United States east of the Rockies, Mexico, and Cuba. A warm-season grass reaching 4 ft (1.2 m), it is a facultative wetland species.
