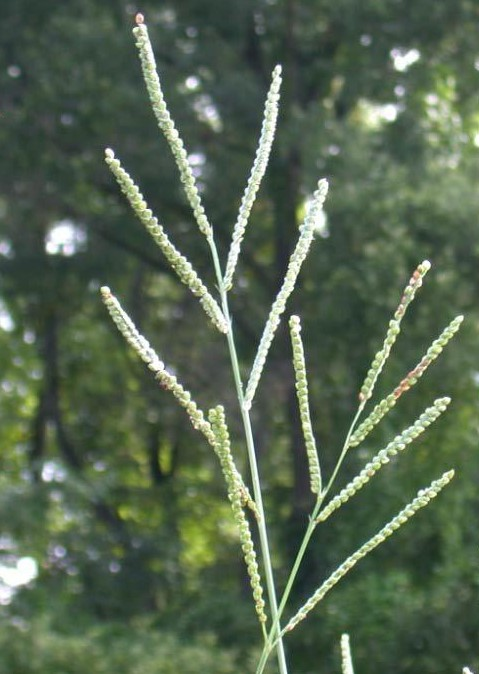
- Culm
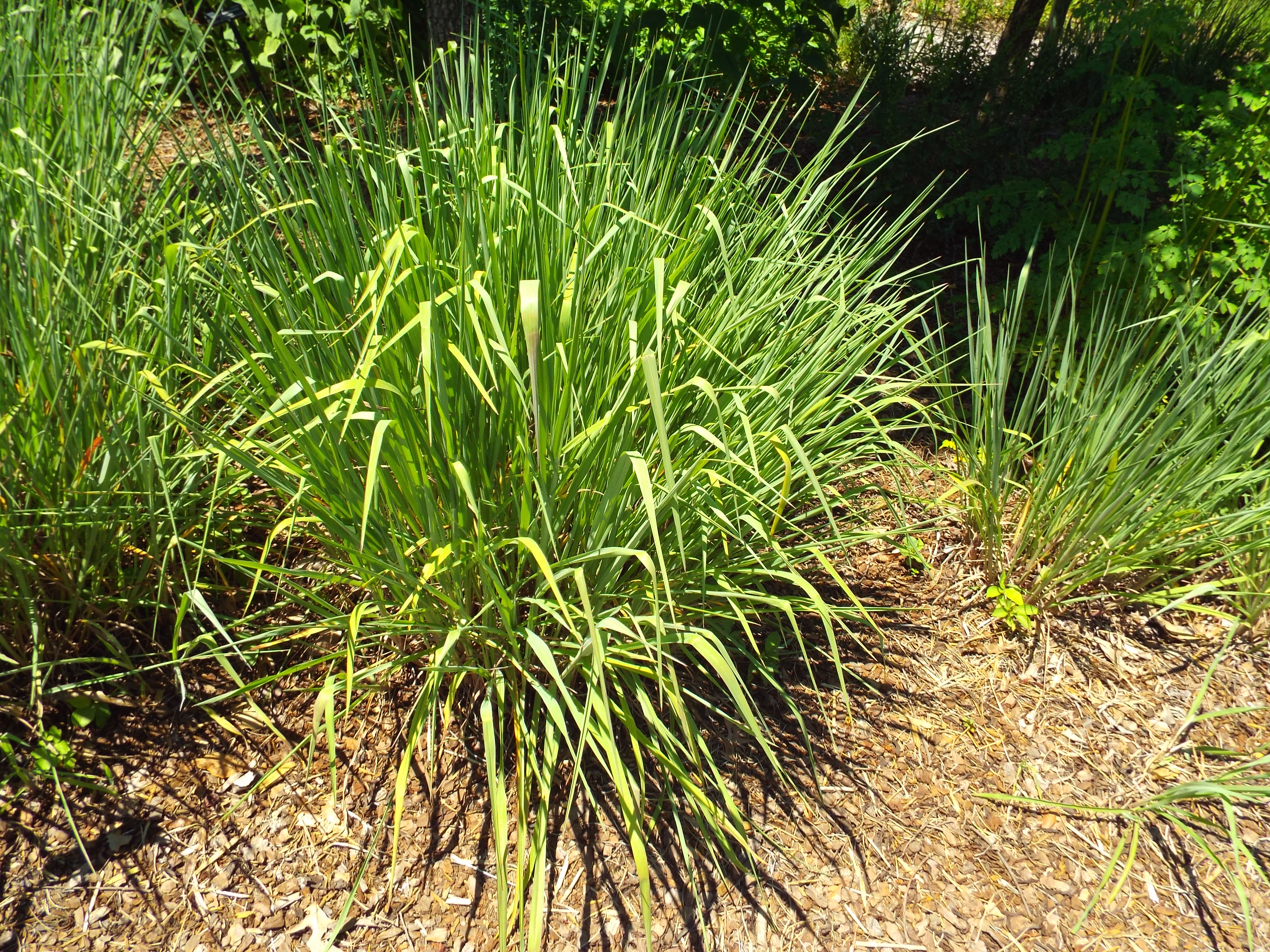
- Leaves

Conservation status
- Secure (NatureServe)

Scientific classification
- Kingdom: Plantae
- Clade: Embryophytes
- Clade: Tracheophytes
- Clade: Spermatophytes
- Clade: Angiosperms
- Clade: Monocots
- Clade: Commelinids
- Order: Poales
- Family: Poaceae
- Subfamily: Panicoideae
- Genus: Paspalum
- Species: P. floridanum

Binomial name
- Paspalum floridanum Michx.

= Paspalum floridanum =

Species of grass

Paspalum floridanum is a species of grass known by the common name Florida paspalum. It is native to the eastern United States.

This rhizomatous perennial grass has stems which can exceed 2 m (6 ft 7 in) in height. The leaf blades are up to 52 cm (20 in) long and may be hairless to hairy, with a dense coating of hairs behind the ligules. The inflorescence is a panicle with up to 6 branches. The paired spikelets are generally oval in shape and measure a few millimeters long.

This grass grows in disturbed, wet habitat types such as ditches. It grows in woods and marshy areas.

The seeds provide food for birds.
