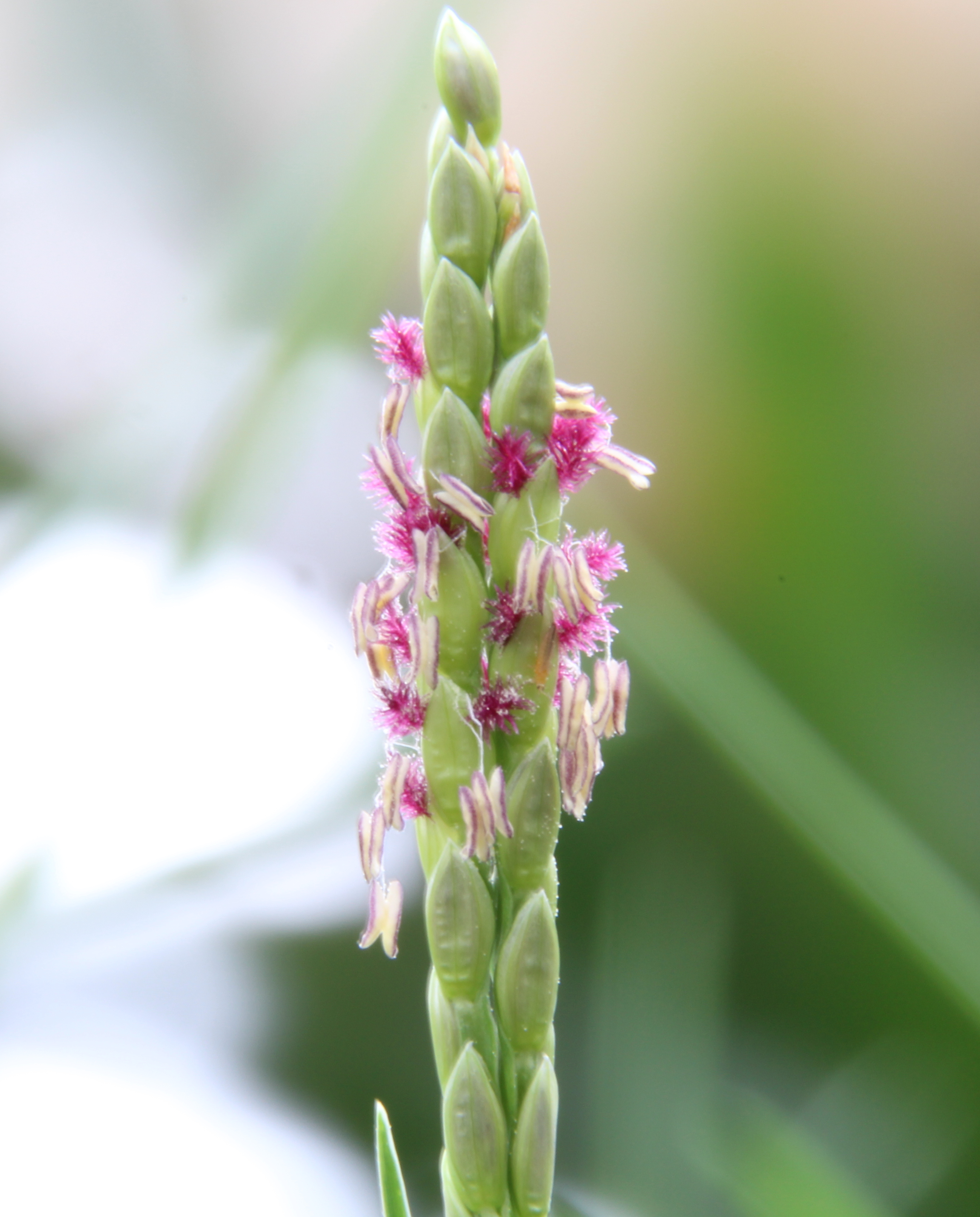

Conservation status
- Secure (NatureServe)

Scientific classification
- Kingdom: Plantae
- Clade: Tracheophytes
- Clade: Angiosperms
- Clade: Monocots
- Clade: Commelinids
- Order: Poales
- Family: Poaceae
- Subfamily: Panicoideae
- Genus: Paspalum
- Species: P. vaginatum

Binomial name
- Paspalum vaginatum Sw.

= Paspalum vaginatum =

Species of plant

Paspalum vaginatum is a species of grass known by many names, including seashore paspalum, biscuit grass, saltwater couch, silt grass, and swamp couch. It is native to the Americas, where it grows in tropical and subtropical regions. It is found throughout the other tropical areas of the world, where it is an introduced species and sometimes an invasive weed. It is also cultivated as a turfgrass in many places.

== Description ==
It is a perennial grass with rhizomes or stolons. The stems grow 10 to 79 centimetres (3.9 to 31.1 in) tall. The leaf blades are 10 to 19 centimetres (3.9 to 7.5 in) long and may be hairless to slightly hairy. They are usually blue-green in color. The panicle is usually a pair of branches up to 7.9 centimetres (3.1 in) long; there is sometimes a third branch below the pair. The branches are lined with oval to lance-shaped spikelets which grow pressed against the branches, making the panicle narrow. This species is similar to bermudagrass. It spreads by its rhizomes and stolons, forming a thick turf. In the wild this species grows in salt marshes and brackish marshes. The genome of Paspalum vaginatum was sequenced in 2022 and the species' haploid genome was determined to be approximately 590 megabases in size.

== Uses ==
This grass has been bred into cultivars which are used for golf course turf and other landscaping projects. It forms a higher quality turf than bermudagrass in poor conditions, such as wet soils and low light levels, and with fewer nitrogen soil amendments. It can grow in lawns that receive rain on 250 days per year, and it can survive being waterlogged or submerged for several days at a time. It tolerates foot traffic. The main advantage of this grass is that it is very salt-tolerant. It can be irrigated with non-potable water, such as greywater, an important advantage in a time when there are increasing restrictions on water use. The grass can even be irrigated with saltwater. The grass will be lower in quality than that irrigated with potable water, but it survives. This species has "filled a niche in America", being a better grass to use on turf next to the ocean in places that receive sea spray. "It has the highest salt tolerance of all turfgrasses." It is also more competitive against weeds than similar grasses. Weeds can be controlled by the application of saltwater, in which weeds will die and the grass will survive.

There are many cultivars bred for various uses. These cultivars are highly variable. For example, fine-textured types are used for golf courses, while coarser grass is selected for roadside revegetation. The best-known and oldest cultivar may be 'Adalayd' a grass with a similar texture and blue-green color to Kentucky bluegrass. The cultivar 'Aloha' is a dark green grass used for golf courses and athletic fields. 'Salam', the most common cultivar in Hawaii, is another dark green type suitable for golf courses. The leaves of 'Salam' are glossy on the undersides, giving the field a striped look when it is mowed. 'Seadwarf' is a bright green type that is more resistant to a grass disease called dollar spot than other cultivars.

There are other uses for the grass, including erosion control in sandy coastal areas, its native habitat. It can be used in phytoremediation when the soils are high in heavy metals. It has been shown to survive pollution with crude oil. It can be used to feed livestock and some wild herbivores will graze it.

Truist Park, the home ballpark of the Atlanta Braves, has Seashore Paspalum Platinum TE as its field surface.
