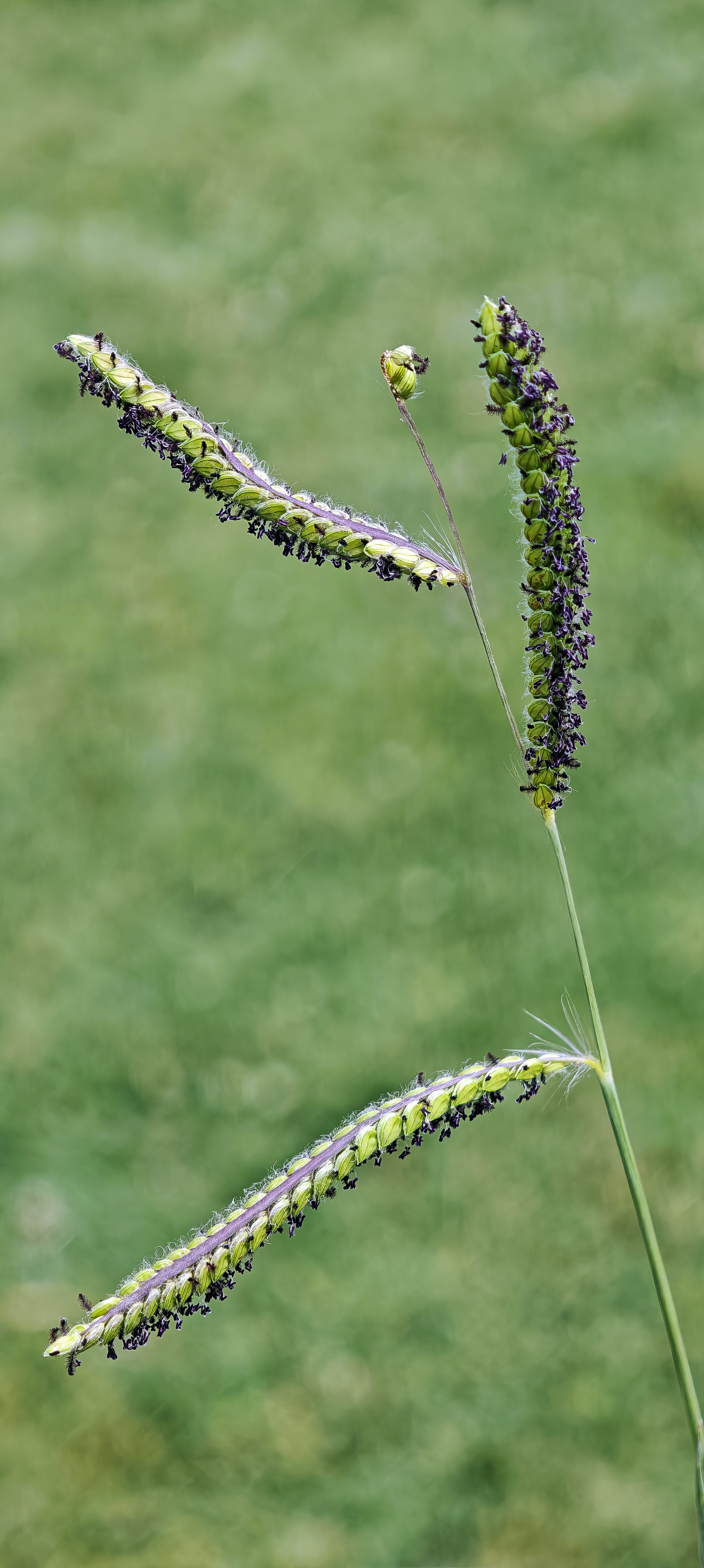

Scientific classification
- Kingdom: Plantae
- Clade: Embryophytes
- Clade: Tracheophytes
- Clade: Spermatophytes
- Clade: Angiosperms
- Clade: Monocots
- Clade: Commelinids
- Order: Poales
- Family: Poaceae
- Subfamily: Panicoideae
- Genus: Paspalum
- Species: P. dilatatum

Binomial name
- Paspalum dilatatum Poir.

= Paspalum dilatatum =

Species of grass

Paspalum dilatatum is a species of grass known by the common name dallisgrass, Dallas grass, or sticky heads. It is native to Brazil and Argentina, but it is known throughout the world as an introduced species and at times a common weed. Its rapid growth and spreading rhizomes make it an invasive pest in some areas. It is present in the southern half of North America, southern Europe, much of Africa, Australia, New Zealand, and many tropical and subtropical areas.

Paspalum dilatatum is a food source for several avian species, including the long-tailed widowbird.

The common name dallisgrass was derived from A. T. Dallis, a 19th-century farmer who grew the species extensively near La Grange, Georgia.

== Description ==
This is a perennial bunch grass forming dense, stiff clumps in the soil and spreading outward. It grows decumbent in a mat or erect to well over 1 m (3 ft) tall. The leaves are mostly hairless, growing up to 35 cm (14 in) long and 2.5 cm (1 in) wide. The inflorescence is divided into a few branches lined neatly with beadlike pairs of green to purple spikelets.
