= Ceresia pulchripes =

Conservation status
- Least Concern (IUCN 3.1)

Scientific classification
- Domain: Eukaryota
- Kingdom: Animalia
- Phylum: Arthropoda
- Class: Insecta
- Order: Orthoptera
- Suborder: Ensifera
- Family: Tettigoniidae
- Subfamily: Tettigoniinae
- Tribe: Arytropteridini
- Genus: Ceresia; Uvarov, 1928
- Species: C. pulchripes

Binomial name
- Ceresia pulchripes (Péringuey, 1916)

Species of cricket-like animal

Ceresia pulchripes, the common ceresia, is a species of bush cricket or katydid endemic to South Africa. It is the only species in the genus Ceresia.
