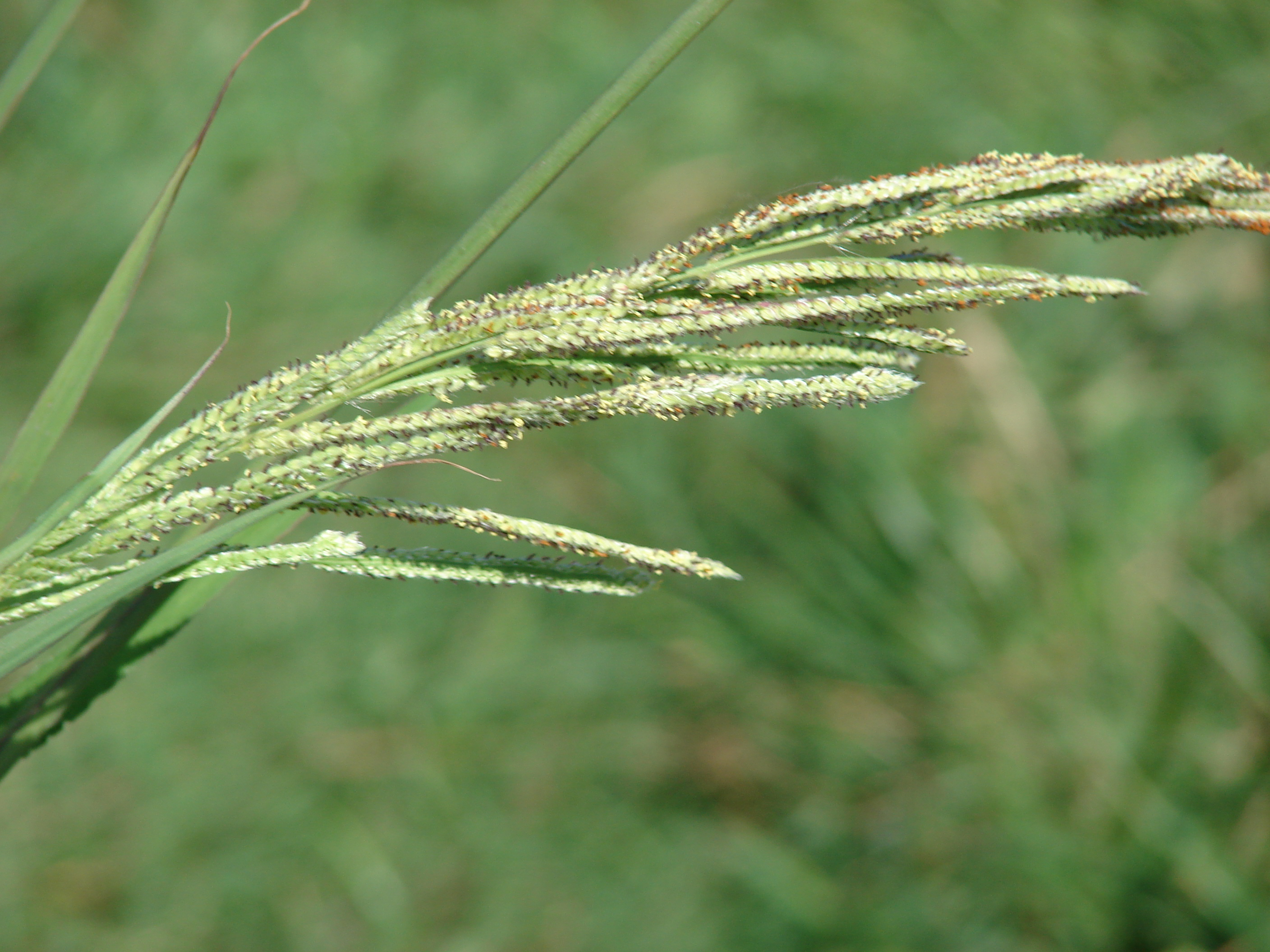

Scientific classification
- Kingdom: Plantae
- Clade: Tracheophytes
- Clade: Angiosperms
- Clade: Monocots
- Clade: Commelinids
- Order: Poales
- Family: Poaceae
- Subfamily: Panicoideae
- Genus: Paspalum
- Species: P. urvillei

Binomial name
- Paspalum urvillei Steud.

= Paspalum urvillei =

Species of grass

Paspalum urvillei is a species of grass known by the common name Vasey's grass, or Vasey grass. It is native to South America, and it is known in parts of North America as an introduced species. It is also naturalised in Australia, New Zealand, Japan, China, and southern Africa, including Madagascar. It is a noxious weed where it has been introduced in Hawaii and New Caledonia. It grows well in disturbed habitat, often in moist areas. This is a rhizomatous perennial grass which may reach 2 meters tall. The leaves are up to 2.5 centimeters wide and have a large, noticeable ligule. The inflorescence is a spreading or drooping array of up to 20
