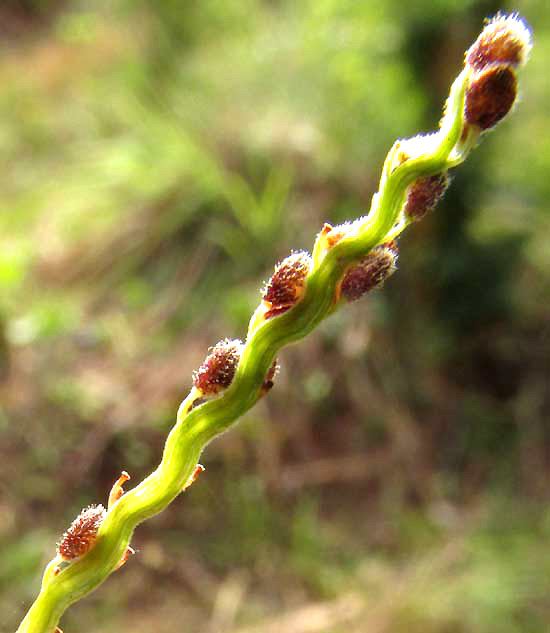
- Paspalum blodgettii zigzagging panicle branch with hairy spikelets

Scientific classification
- Kingdom: Plantae
- Clade: Embryophytes
- Clade: Tracheophytes
- Clade: Spermatophytes
- Clade: Angiosperms
- Clade: Monocots
- Clade: Commelinids
- Order: Poales
- Family: Poaceae
- Subfamily: Panicoideae
- Genus: Paspalum
- Species: P. blodgettii

Binomial name
- Paspalum blodgettii Chapm.

Synonyms
- Paspalum dissectum Sw. ex Roem. & Schult.; Paspalum gracillimum Nash; Paspalum simpsonii Nash; Paspalum yucatanum Chase

= Paspalum blodgettii =

Species of plant

Paspalum blodgettii, with no dominant English name, though sometimes called Blodgett's paspalum, coral paspalum and more, is a species of grass occurring in the American tropics. It belongs to the family Poaceae.

== Discription ==
In the field, Paspalum blodgettii is recognized by its few inflorescence branches bearing unusually small, hairy spikelets in pairs. Here are more noteworthy features:

- It grows in tufts up to 90 cm (35 in) tall. Its stems are without hairlike trichomes except sometimes at stem joints.
- Leaves are up to 27 cm (11 in) long and 25 mm (1 in) wide, appearing hairy or not. Ligules are up to 0.5 mm (1/32 in) tall
- Inflorescences appearing at stem tops and up to 12 cm (4 3/4 in) long are panicles composed of 3-12 raceme-type branches. Branch rachises are somewhat triangular in cross section and bear a spikelet at their tips.
- Plump spikelets up to 1.4 mm (1/16 in) long and nearly as wide are broadest a little above their middles, and arise in pairs along branch rachises. Spikelets have no lower glume, but rather their surfaces are covered by the upper glume and the lemma, which are densely hairy with glands.

== Distribution ==
Paspalum blodgettii occurs in southeastern Mexico, in Central America south to Honduras, and the Greater Antilles. In the USA it occurs in southern Florida, and apparently there's a disjunct population in Panamá.

== Habitat ==
In Florida it occurs in pine rocklands (critically imperiled habitat dominated by slash pine), rockland hammock, coastal rock barrens, coastal strands and disturbed areas atop limestone.

In Mexico's Yucatan Peninsula it inhabits tropical forests with deciduous leaves, and disturbed areas such as roadsides and weedy fields. In Cuba it grows in dry scrubland, semi-natural savannas and herbazales, which are places along streams and rivers with mostly or entirely herbaceous plants.

== As a forage plant ==
In Mexico's Yucatan Peninsula, Paspalum blodgettii is regarded as a forage plant.

== Taxonomy ==
In 1860 when Alvan Wentworth Chapman formally named and described Paspalum blodgettii, he was looking at the type specimen from Key West at the southern tip of Florida. A "Dr. Blodgett" was mentioned, presumably the collector. Dr. John Loomis Blodgett is known to have lived in Key West during the 1800s, to have collected many species for the first time noted in the USA, and to have made his specimens available to others.

=== Phylogeny ===
Molecular phylogenetic analysis using parsimony, likelihood, and Bayesian inference, found Paspalum blodgettii to be sister to P. maritimum, despite notable morphological differences. On the other hand, Paspalum blodgettii physically strongly resembles Paspalum laxum, but the two taxa are not closely phylogenetically related.

=== Etymology ===
The genus name Paspalum is New Latin from Greek paspalos, meaning "millet."

The species name blodgettii undoubtedly honors the collector of the taxon's type specimen, Dr. John Loomis Blodgett.

== Gallery ==
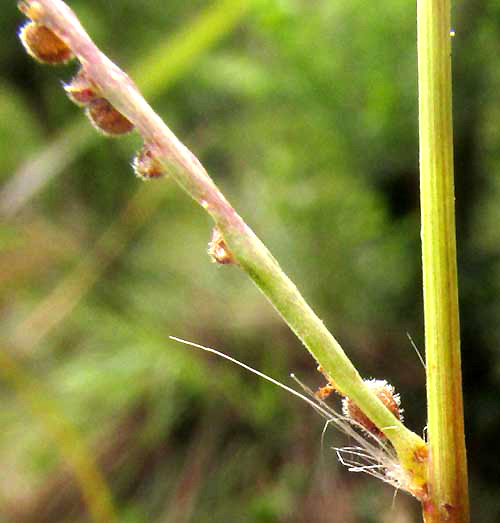
trichomes at base of lower panicle branch

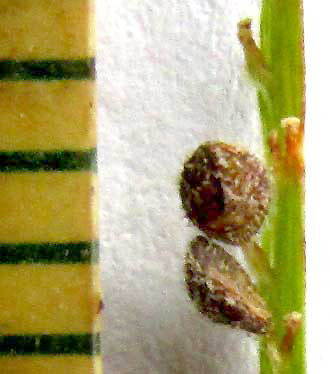
spikelets with mm scale

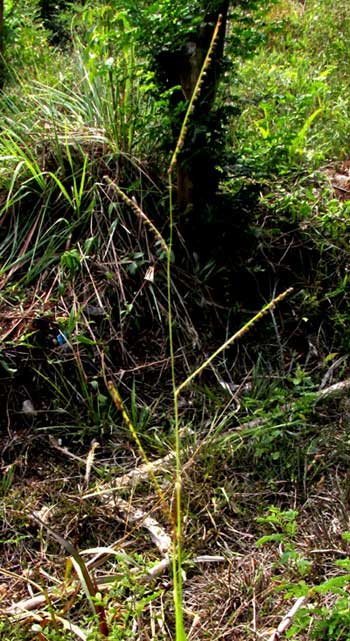
panicle branches

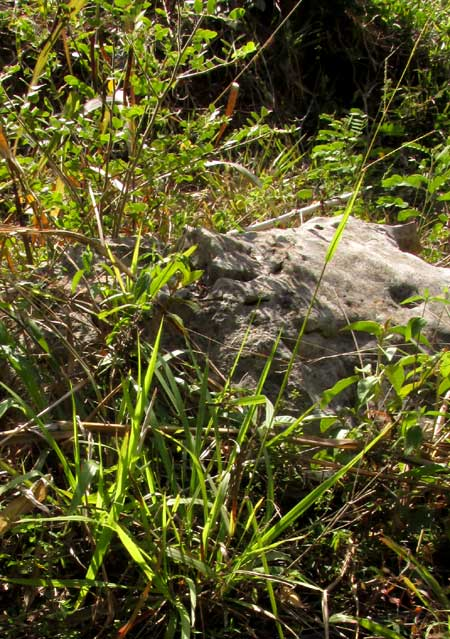
in habitat
