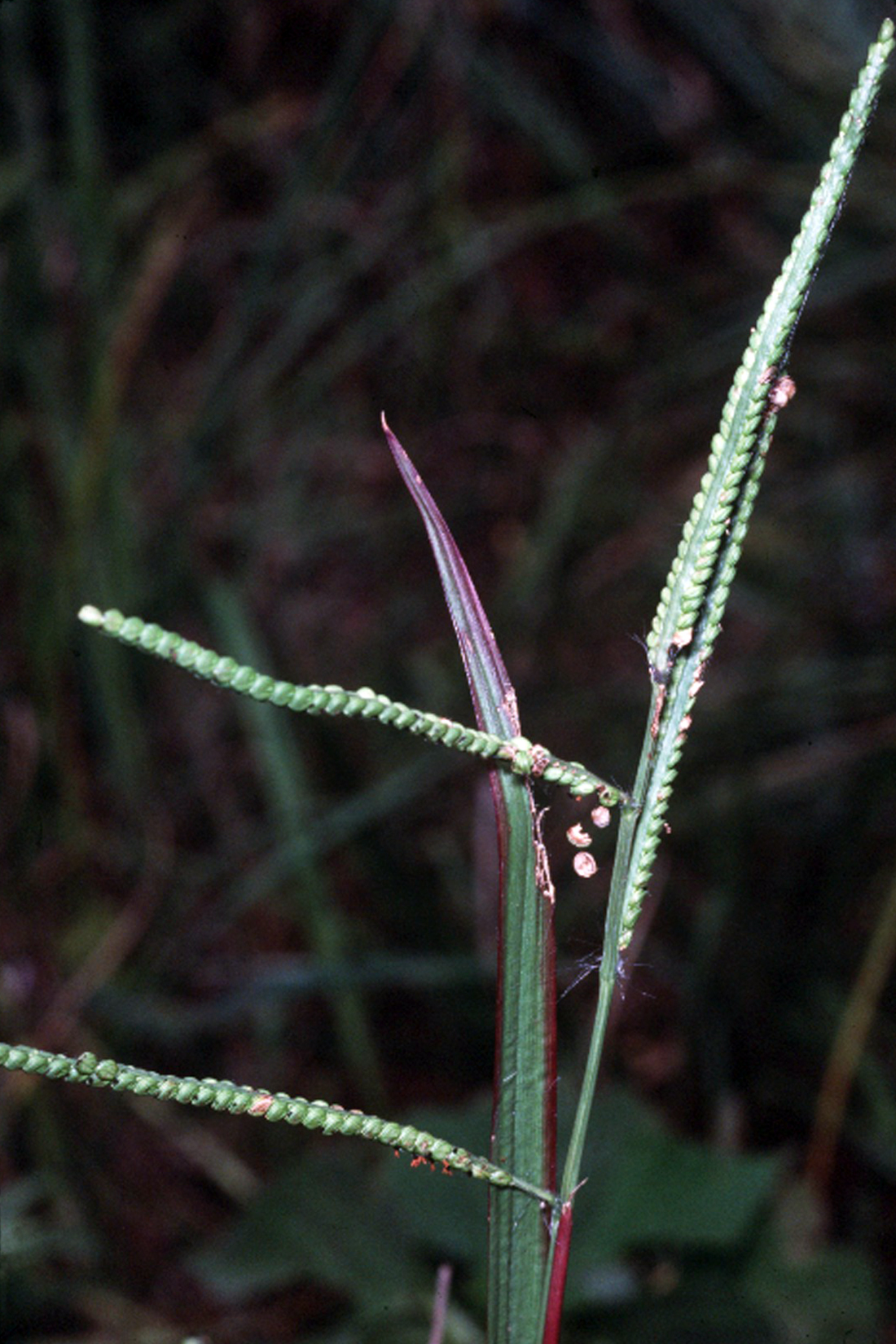
- Paspalum laeve

Scientific classification
- Kingdom: Plantae
- Clade: Tracheophytes
- Clade: Angiosperms
- Clade: Monocots
- Clade: Commelinids
- Order: Poales
- Family: Poaceae
- Subfamily: Panicoideae
- Genus: Paspalum
- Species: P. laeve

Binomial name
- Paspalum laeve Michx.

= Paspalum laeve =

Species of plant

Paspalum laeve common name field paspalum, is a plant found in North America. Its distribution ranges from the southeastern United States northward to New York and westward to Texas and Kansas.

It is listed as threatened in Connecticut. Paspalum laeve var. circulare, common names round field beadgrass and hairy field beadgrass, is endangered in New York (state).

== Description ==
P. laeve's blades are 20 centimeters (approximately 8 inches) in length, with a width ranging between 1 and 10 millimeters (0.03 to 0.3 inches). It spikelets grow in two rows, and are 2.5 to 3 millimeters across.

== Habitat ==
This species is found on forest edges and can grow in areas that have been disturbed. Specimens of P. laeve have been collected from habitats such as coastal hammocks, wiregrass palmetto flatwoods, pond edges, low field, and old pasture. P. laeve has intermediate levels of drought and shade tolerance.
