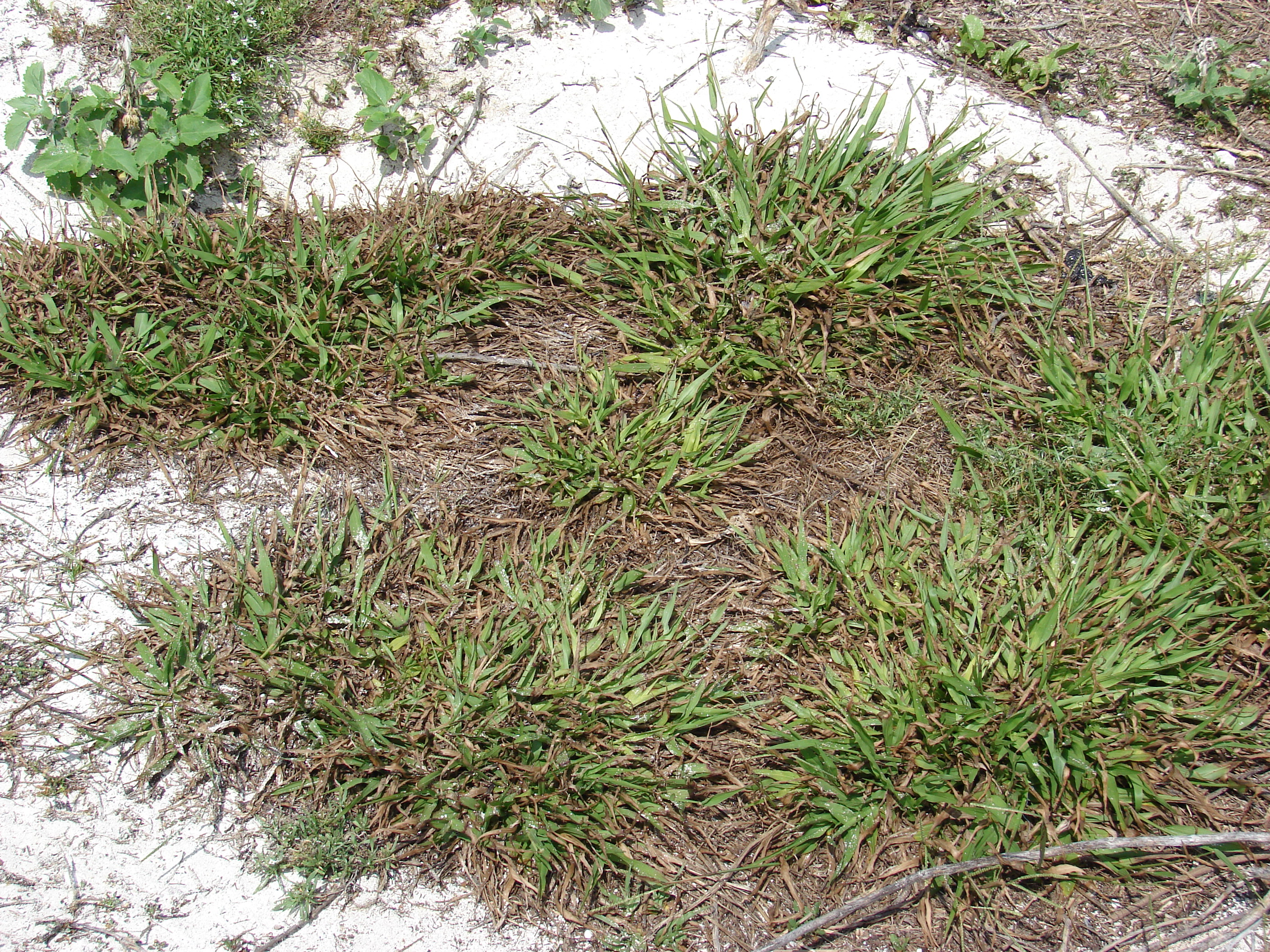
- growing as a weed on Midway Atoll

Conservation status
- Secure (NatureServe)

Scientific classification
- Kingdom: Plantae
- Clade: Embryophytes
- Clade: Tracheophytes
- Clade: Spermatophytes
- Clade: Angiosperms
- Clade: Monocots
- Clade: Commelinids
- Order: Poales
- Family: Poaceae
- Subfamily: Panicoideae
- Genus: Paspalum
- Species: P. setaceum

Binomial name
- Paspalum setaceum Michx.

= Paspalum setaceum =

Species of plant

Paspalum setaceum is a species of grass known by several common names, including thin paspalum. It is native to the Americas, where it can be found in the eastern and central United States, Ontario in Canada, Mexico, Central America, and the Caribbean. It can be found in other areas of the world as an introduced, and often invasive, species, including many Pacific Islands. It is a weed of lawns and turf.

Paspalum setaceum can be found in habitat types such as savannas, sandhills, and grasslands. It has displayed preference for dry soils.

This grass is a perennial with erect or prostrate stems that can exceed 1 m (3 ft 3 in) in length. The flat leaf blades range from hairless to slightly hairy, and vary in color. The panicle has up to 6 branches, which grow up to 17 cm (6.7 in) long and are lined with small oval to rounded spikelets. There are several varieties of this species which can be distinguished in part by color. Some authors do not recognize varieties.

Varieties include:

- Paspalum setaceum var. ciliatifolium (fringe-leaf paspalum) - dark green or purplish leaf blades. Widespread. Grows as a weed in the Pacific Islands.
- Paspalum setaceum var. longepedunculatum (barestem paspalum) - yellow-green leaf blades
- Paspalum setaceum var. muhlenbergii (hurrahgrass) - North America
- Paspalum setaceum var. psammophilum (sand paspalum, beadgrass, slender beadgrass, tufted beard-grass) - hairy leaf blades. East Coast of the United States.
- Paspalum setaceum var. setaceum (thin paspalum) - hairy gray-green leaf blades
- Paspalum setaceum var. stramineum (yellow sand paspalum) - yellow-green to dark green leaf blades
- Paspalum setaceum var. villosissimum (hairy paspalum) - gray-green leaf blades
