= Paspalum batianoffii =

Conservation status
- Extinct (EPBC Act)

Scientific classification
- Kingdom: Plantae
- Clade: Tracheophytes
- Clade: Angiosperms
- Clade: Monocots
- Clade: Commelinids
- Order: Poales
- Family: Poaceae
- Subfamily: Panicoideae
- Genus: Paspalum
- Species: †P. batianoffii

Binomial name
- †Paspalum batianoffii B.K.Simon

Species of shrub

Paspalum batianoffii is an extinct grass species which was endemic to Rosslyn Bay. It was only known from a single location on the foredunes at Statue Bay Beach 6.5 km from Yeppoon, Capricorn Coast in Central Queensland

== Distribution and habitat ==
This species was only known from one preserved herbarium specimen collected by Australian Botanist, Batianoff, G.N and Mcdonald, T.J, in 1977 and later identified in 1991. It was collected growing at Statue Bay Beach near the Rosslyn Head Section of the Capricorn Coast National Park. The collection remark states that Paspalum batianoffii was a "stoloniferous perennial which grew on a beach just above high water mark, in its growth habit it is similar to Stenotaphrum secundatum on some foredunes in the area, performing sand binding function". P. batianoffii occurred on a very narrow foredune in open casuarina woodland containing Casuarina equisetifolia var. incana with Hibiscus tiliaceus, and Excoecaria agallocha in less exposed areas. The ground cover of this habitat was a mix of many introduced and native plant species such as Panicum maximum, Ipomoea pes-caprae, Zoysia macrantha, and another Paspalum species.

=== Regional ecosystem ===
The regional ecosystem which species resided in is 8.2.1 with a 28a broad vegetation group (1:1M) code. Today there's 900 Hectares remaining as remnant vegetation compared to 1000 hectares prior to land clearing. It is classified as "Of concern" under the Queensland Vegetation Management Act 1999. The dominant species in this ecoystem is Casuarina equisetifolia subsp. incana (Coastal She-oak) creating a low woodland with drawf open shrubland, open scrub, sparse-dense herbland, on foredunes. Other species commonly associated with this vegetation include: Thespesia populnea, Sophora tomentosa, Pandanus tectorius, Alphitonia excelsa, Geijera salicifolia, and Guilandina bonduc. The dominant Coastal She-Oak species is fire sensitive and is readily killed by fire even at low intensities. Disturbance by fire, vechiles, livestock, and human foot traffic readily causes erosion and incursion of invasive weeds such as Lantana camara, Melinis repens, Tridax procumbens, Salsola australis, Megathyrsus maximus, Catharanthus roseus, Opuntia stricta, Passiflora suberosa, P. pallida, Cenchrus echinatus, C. ciliaris, and Stachytarpheta jamaicensis.

== Conservation status ==
Paspalum batianoffii is listed as "extinct in the wild" under the Queensland Nature Conservation Act 1992, and listed as "Extinct" under the Australian Government Environment Protection and Biodiversity Conservation Act 1999. The reason for the species decline and extinction remains unknown.

== See also ==
- Androcalva perkinsiana
