= Paspalum repens =

Scientific classification
- Kingdom: Plantae
- Clade: Tracheophytes
- Clade: Angiosperms
- Clade: Monocots
- Clade: Commelinids
- Order: Poales
- Family: Poaceae
- Subfamily: Panicoideae
- Genus: Paspalum
- Species: P. repens

Binomial name
- Paspalum repens P.J.Bergius

Synonyms
- Synonyms list: Ceresia fluitans Elliott; Cymatochloa fluitans (Elliott) Schltdl.; Cymatochloa repens (P.J.Bergius) Schltdl.; Paspalum bistipulatum Hochst. ex Steud.; Paspalum fluctuans Larrañaga; Paspalum fluitans (Elliott) Kunth; Paspalum frankii Steud.; Paspalum gracile Rudge; Paspalum mucronatum Muhl.; Paspalum natans Leconte; Paspalum paniculatum Walter; Paspalum pyramidale Nees; Paspalum repens var. fluitans (Elliott) Wipff & S.D.Jones

Species of grass

Paspalum repens, known as horsetail paspalum or water paspalum, is a species of grass native to South America, Central America, and North America. It is often called Paspalum fluitans, though this name is treated as a synonym of P. repens in Kew's Plants of the World Online database and the Flora of North America project. It is an obligate wetland species, often found submersed or floating in shallow water bodies or on the edges of rivers. It grows to be about a foot tall, with lance shaped leaves, spongy air-filled stems, and often a reddish tint. Inflorescence takes the form of spikelets.

== Wildlife value ==
Paspalum repens has a medium protein content; it is highly palatable for both browsing and grazing animals and is a favored food of Manatees.
