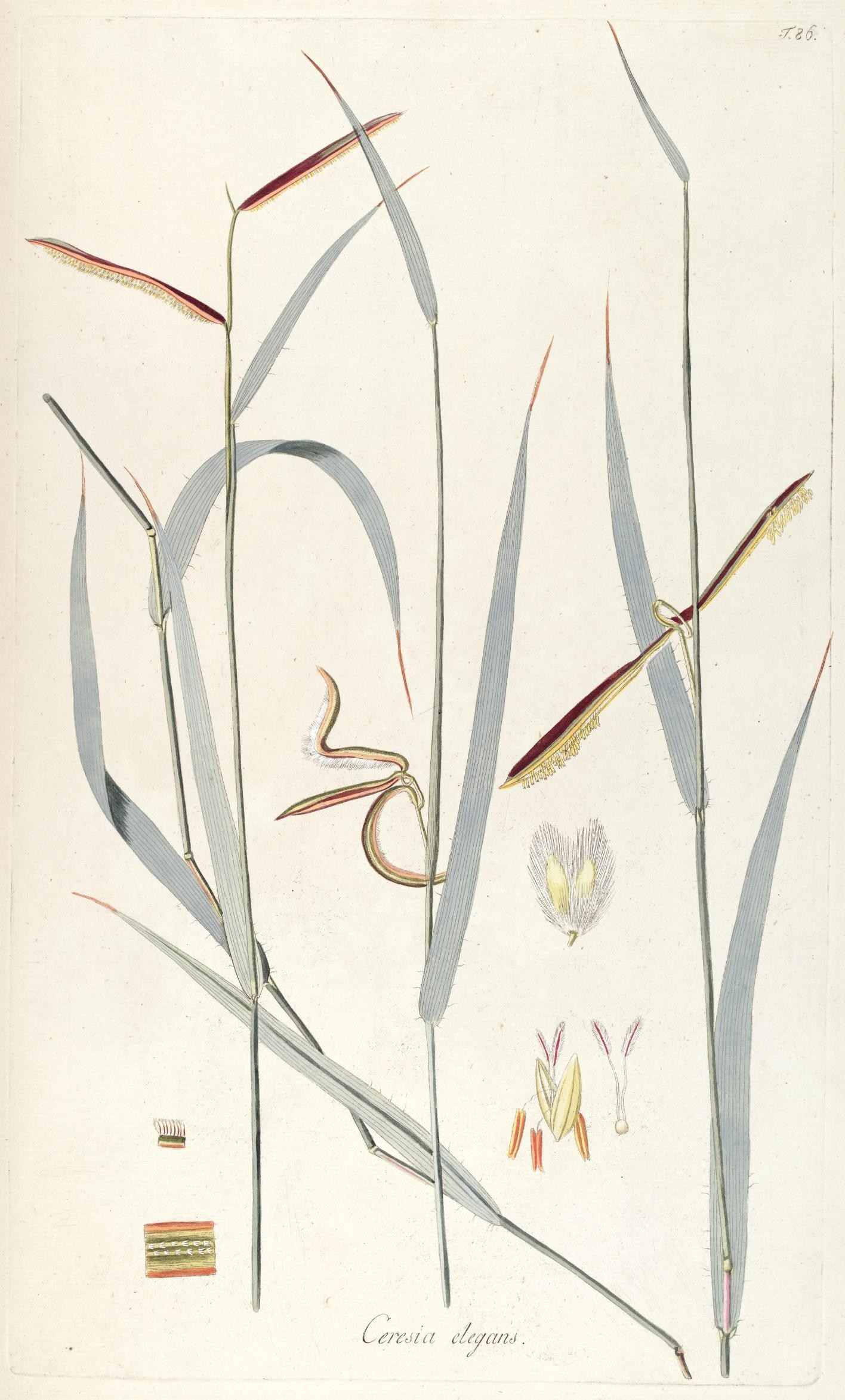

Scientific classification
- Kingdom: Plantae
- Clade: Tracheophytes
- Clade: Angiosperms
- Clade: Monocots
- Clade: Commelinids
- Order: Poales
- Family: Poaceae
- Subfamily: Panicoideae
- Genus: Paspalum
- Species: P. ceresia

Binomial name
- Paspalum ceresia (Kuntze) Chase, 1925

Synonyms
- Several, including: Ceresia elegans Pers.

= Paspalum ceresia =

Species of plant

Paspalum ceresia is a species of grass in the family Poaceae. It is found in South America (Argentina, Bolivia, Brazil, Ecuador, Paraguay, Peru).
