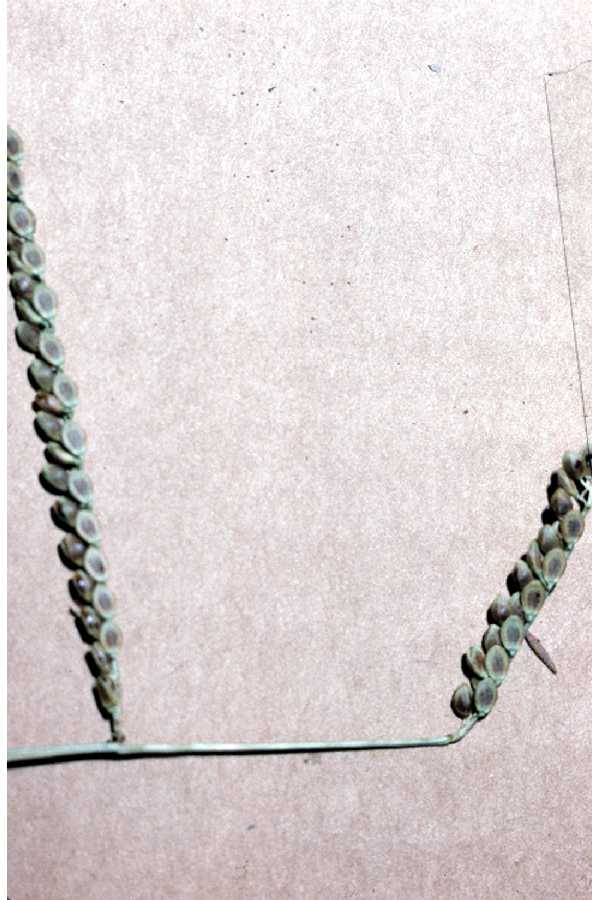

Conservation status
- Secure (NatureServe)

Scientific classification
- Kingdom: Plantae
- Clade: Tracheophytes
- Clade: Angiosperms
- Clade: Monocots
- Clade: Commelinids
- Order: Poales
- Family: Poaceae
- Subfamily: Panicoideae
- Genus: Paspalum
- Species: P. plicatulum

Binomial name
- Paspalum plicatulum Michx.

= Paspalum plicatulum =

Species of plant

Paspalum plicatulum is a species of grass known by the common name brownseed paspalum. In Brazil its names include capim coquerinho, felpudo and pasto-negro. It is called zong zi que bai in Chinese and herbe à cheval in French. In South America its names include camalote, gamelotillo, and hierba de cepa. It is native to the Americas, where it occurs in the southeastern United States, Mexico, the Caribbean, and parts of South America.

This rhizomatous perennial grass has thick stems which can exceed 1 metre (3 ft) in height. The leaf blades are up to 35 centimetres (14 in) long. The inflorescence is a panicle with up to 7 branches. The paired spikelets are generally oval in shape and are brown in color.

In its native range this grass grows in disturbed areas as well as prairies and forests. It is planted in many areas of the world to feed livestock.

The seeds provide food for birds. It is used as a pasture grass and it can be made into hay. It can be grown on low-fertility soils. Cultivars include 'Bryan', 'Hartley', and 'Rodd's Bay'.
