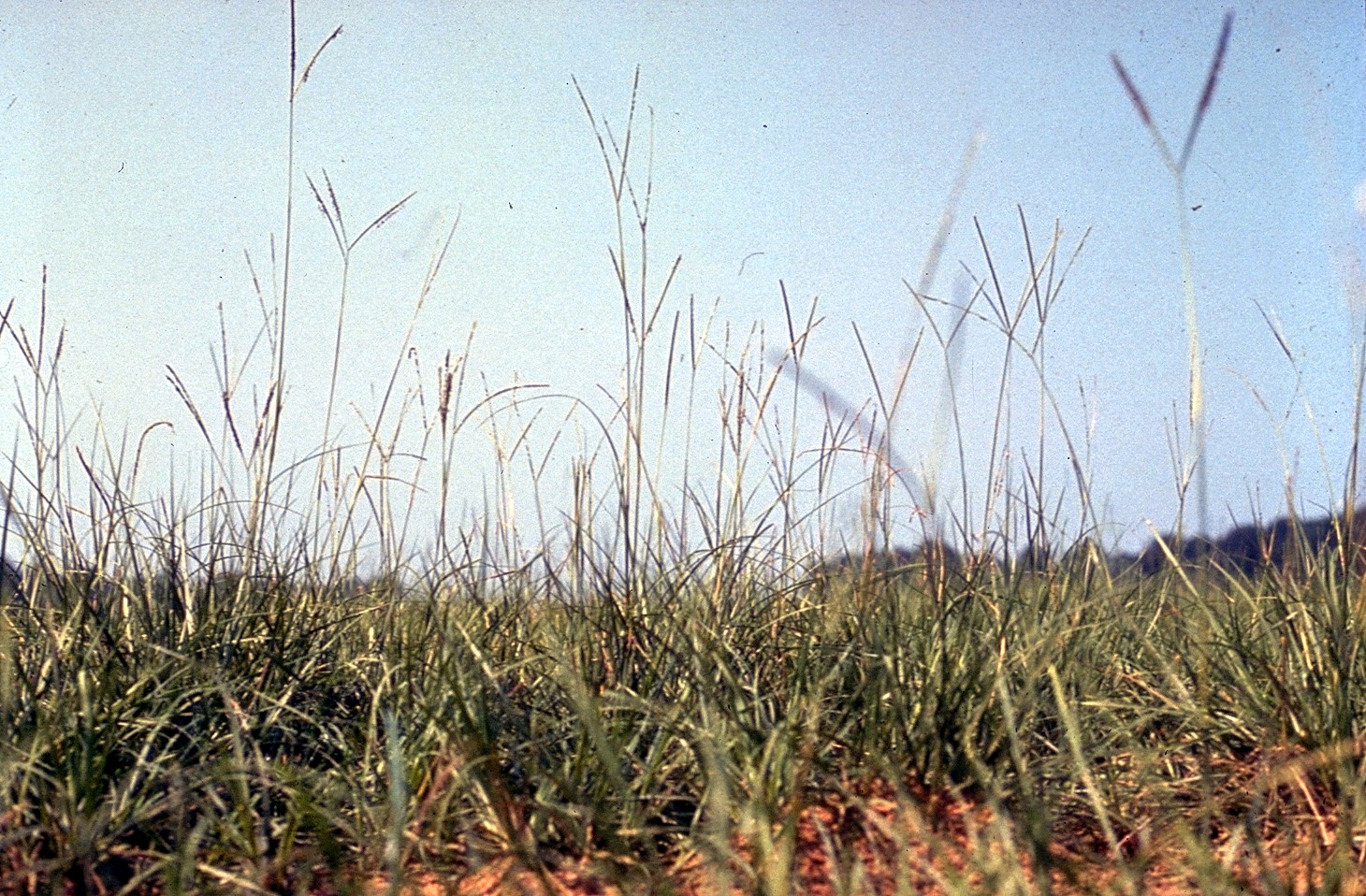

Scientific classification
- Kingdom: Plantae
- Clade: Tracheophytes
- Clade: Angiosperms
- Clade: Monocots
- Clade: Commelinids
- Order: Poales
- Family: Poaceae
- Subfamily: Panicoideae
- Genus: Paspalum
- Species: P. notatum

Binomial name
- Paspalum notatum Flüggé

= Paspalum notatum =

Species of plant

Paspalum notatum, known commonly as bahiagrass, common bahia, and Pensacola bahia, is a tropical to subtropical perennial grass (family Poaceae). It is known for its prominent V-shaped inflorescence consisting of two spike-like racemes containing multiple tiny spikelets, each about 2.8–3.5 millimetres (0.11–0.14 in) long.

This grass is low-growing and creeping with stolons and stout, scaly rhizomes. The stolons are pressed firmly to the ground and root freely from the internodes, forming a dense sod. The flat, tough-textured leaves are usually hairless, with blades 2–6 millimetres (0.079–0.236 in) wide. They are flat, folded, and inrolled, tapering to a fine point. The leaf bases at the terminus of each rhizome usually have a purplish hue. The stems reach 20–75 centimetres (7.9–29.5 in) tall.

The terminal dual racemes are each attached to the top of a slender stem or with one slightly below the other. There is occasionally a third. The spikelets closely overlap in two rows. They are broad, rounded, smooth and shiny. Inside each spikelet is a tiny flower. The tiny, black, featherlike stigmas and black stamens can be seen dangling at the tips of the flowers.

Bahia grass is native to Mexico and South America, but has been naturalized elsewhere in North America and in other regions. It prefers sandy soils and is tolerant of shade. It is also fairly hardy, tolerating saline conditions and drought.

This grass is used primarily as a forage. The nutritive value remains high when mature, but it is not very productive. It is also valued as an erosion-controlling soil stabilizer, as well as for its productivity, ease of establishment, and persistence. It makes a relatively low-maintenance turf as well, with its toleration for minimal maintenance, drought tolerance, and with less disease and insect damage than some of the other warm-season grasses.

The grass uses C4 photosynthesis.
