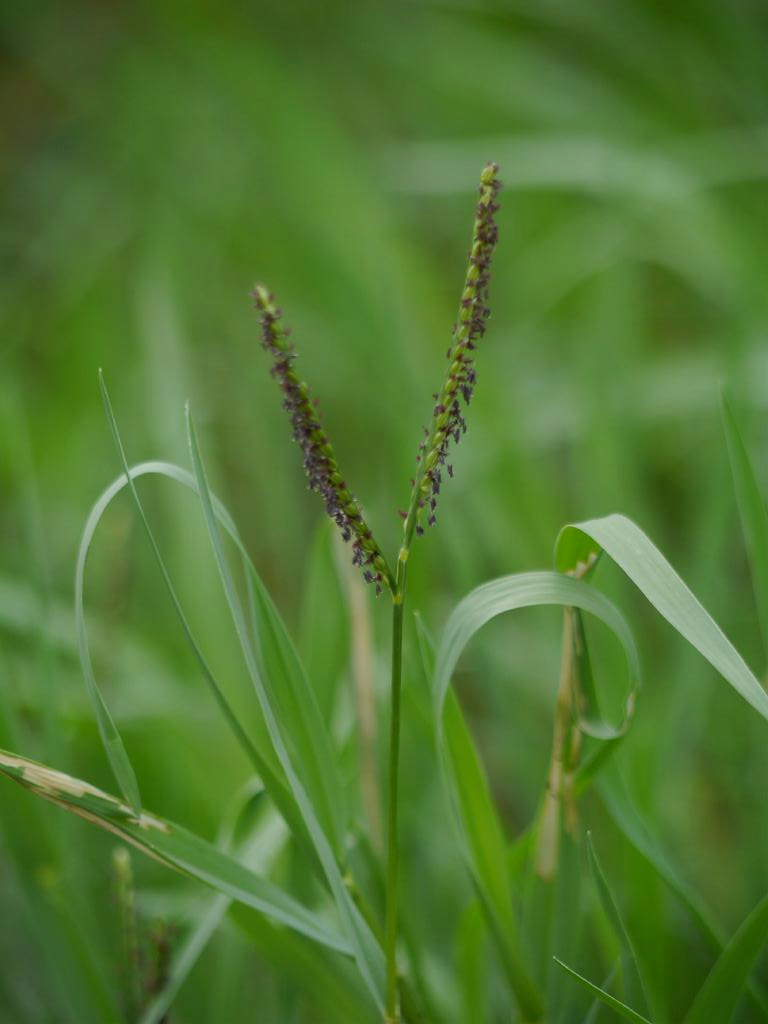
- Paspalum distichum

Scientific classification
- Kingdom: Plantae
- Clade: Tracheophytes
- Clade: Angiosperms
- Clade: Monocots
- Clade: Commelinids
- Order: Poales
- Family: Poaceae
- Subfamily: Panicoideae
- Supertribe: Andropogonodae
- Tribe: Paspaleae
- Subtribe: Paspalinae
- Genus: Paspalum; L.

Type species
- Paspalum dimidiatum L.

Synonyms
- Sabsab Adans., nom. superfl.; Anachyris Nees; Ceresia Pers.; Cleachne Roll.-Germ. ex Rottb.; Cymatochloa Schltdl.; Dichromus Schltdl., nom. illeg.; Dimorphostachys E.Fourn.; Maizilla Schltdl.; Paspalanthium Desv.; Reimaria Humb. & Bonpl. ex Flüggé; Reimarochloa Hitchc.; Thrasya Kunth; Thrasyopsis Parodi; Tylothrasya Döll

= Paspalum =

Genus of grasses

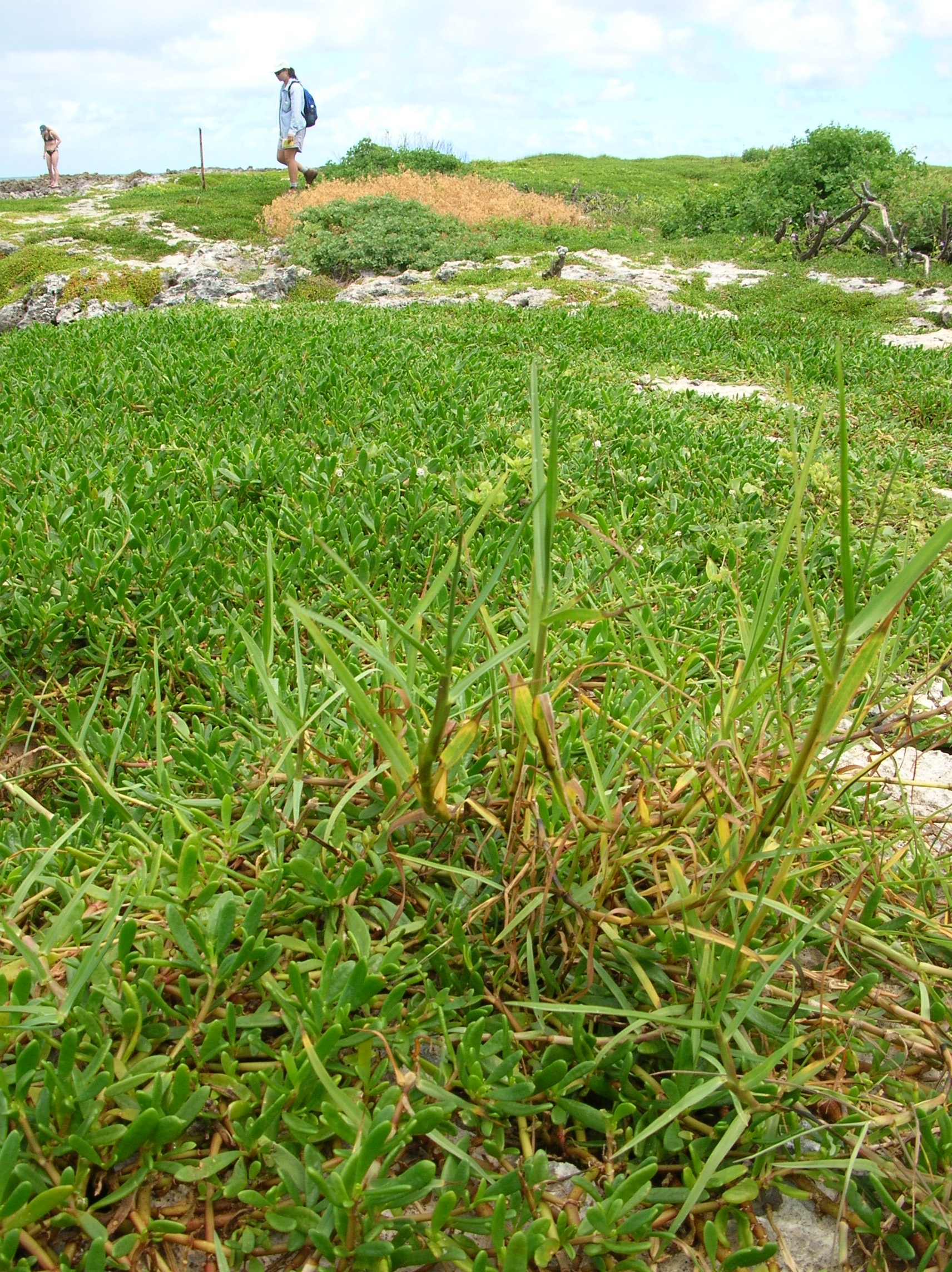
Water finger-grass, Paspalum vaginatum

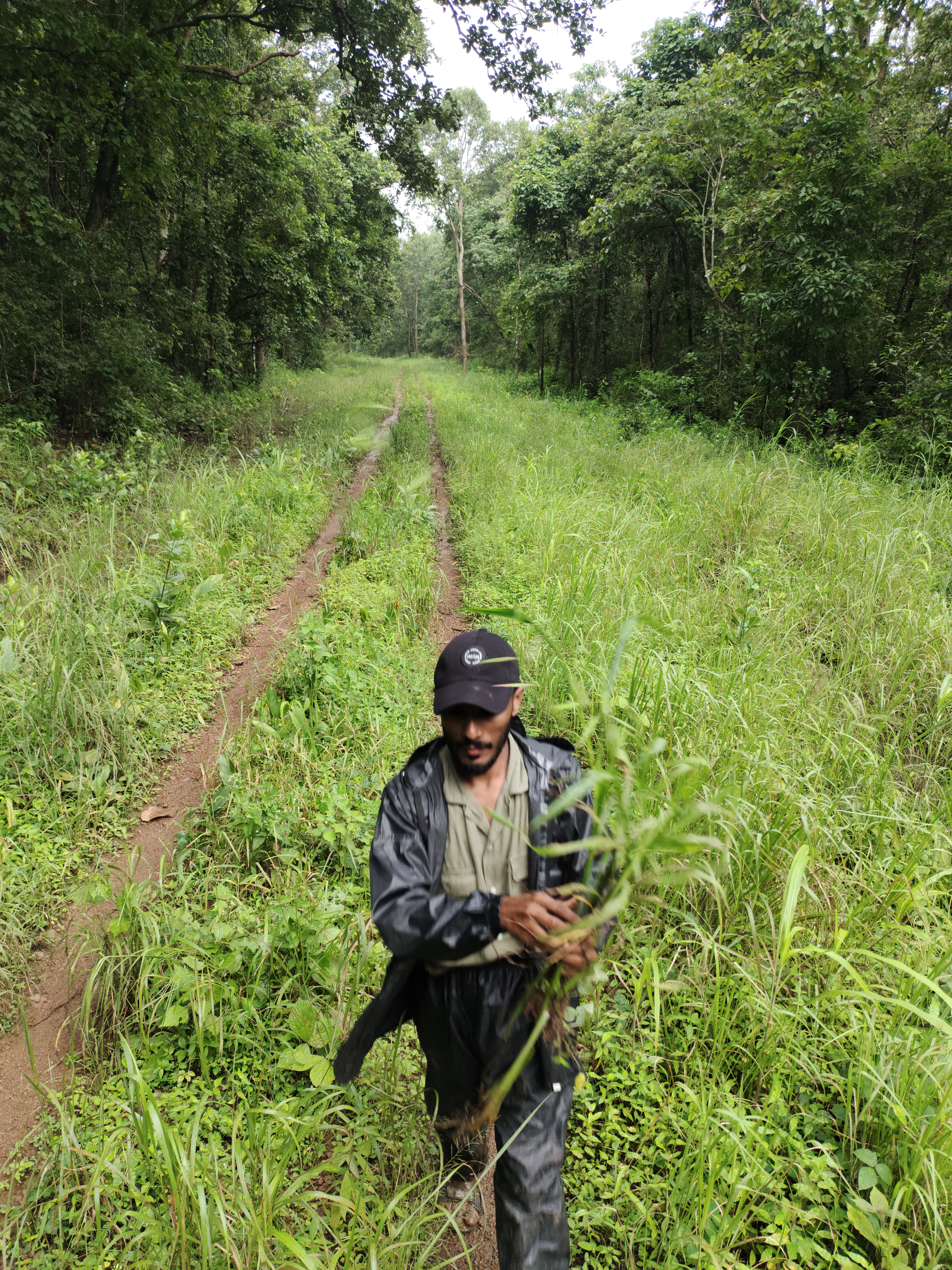
Mr. Shahid Nawaz Landge collecting Paspalum longifolium var. lorirhachis Bor from its natural habitats, Madhya Pradesh, India.

Paspalum is a genus of plants in the grass family.

The group is widespread across much of Asia, Africa, Australia, and the Americas. Commonly known as paspalum, bahiagrasses, crowngrasses or dallis grasses, many of the species are tall perennial New World grasses. They are warm-season C_{4} grasses and are most diverse in subtropical and tropical regions.

Paspalum scrobiculatum (koda, varuka, varuku, etc.) is a millet locally grown as food grain. Some species, such as bahiagrass (P. notatum) and P. nicorae, are grown for pasturage, especially with the perennial forage peanut (Arachis glabrata) as a companion crop. Bahiagrass has also some significance as a honey plant.

Water finger-grass (P. vaginatum) resembles bermudagrass (Cynodon dactylon), but has a higher salinity tolerance and can consume greywater. It is not infrequently used for arena and golf course turf in warmer coastal regions, such as Baja California, Florida, Peru, Texas and Venezuela. Dedicated paspalum cultivars such as 'Aloha Seashore' or 'Platinum TE' have been produced for such uses.

Paspalums are also food for caterpillars of lepidopterans such as the pasture day moth (Apina callisto), and those of the dark palm dart (Telicota ancilla) which feed on P. urvillei. Granivorous birds often eat paspalum seeds; the chestnut-breasted munia (Lonchura castaneothorax) readily feeds on the seeds of P. longifolium, for example.

The ergot Claviceps paspali is a sac fungus that grows on Paspalum, producing ergot alkaloids and the tremorgen paspalitrem; it causes "paspalum staggers" poisoning in cattle.

Tussock paspalum (P. quadrifarium) is considered a noxious weed in Australia. The term “paspalum” without qualification in Australia refers to the common lawn weed P. dilatatum. Australia has five native (Note: Including Paspalum orbiculare, Paspalum vaginatum, Paspalum longifolium) and approximately sixteen naturalised species.

Daikin Park, the home ballpark of the Houston Astros, has Platinum TE Paspalum as its field surface.

== Selected species ==
- Paspalum azuayense
- Paspalum arundinaceum
- Paspalum bakeri
- †Paspalum batianoffii
- Paspalum blodgettii
- Paspalum boscianum
- Paspalum caespitosum
- Paspalum ceresia
- Paspalum clavuliferum
- Paspalum conjugatum P.J.Bergius – carabao grass, hilo grass
- Paspalum convexum
- Paspalum decumbens
- Paspalum densum
- Paspalum dilatatum – dallis grass
- Paspalum dispar
- Paspalum distichum
- Paspalum fasciculatum
- Paspalum fimbriatum
- Paspalum floridanum
- Paspalum fluitans
- Paspalum geminatum
- Paspalum longifolium
- Paspalum laeve Michx. – smooth paspalum
- Paspalum laxum
- Paspalum longifolium
- Paspalum longum
- Paspalum macrophyllum
- Paspalum mandiocanum
- Paspalum maritimum
- Paspalum millegrana
- Paspalum minus
- Paspalum molle
- Paspalum nicorae
- Paspalum notatum – bahiagrass, Pensacola bahiagrass
- Paspalum orbiculare G.Forst.
- Paspalum orbiculatum Poir.
- Paspalum paniculatum L.
- Paspalum parviflorum
- Paspalum paucispicatum
- Paspalum peckii
- Paspalum pleostachyum
- Paspalum plicatulum – brownseed paspalum
- Paspalum pulchellum
- Paspalum pubiflorum
- Paspalum quadrifarium – tussock paspalum
- Paspalum repens
- Paspalum rugulosum
- Paspalum rupestre
- Paspalum schesslii
- Paspalum scrobiculatum – koda millet, kodo millet, kodra millet, varuka (Sanskrit), varuku (Tamil)
- Paspalum secans
- Paspalum setaceum – slender paspalum
- Paspalum soboliferum
- Paspalum urvillei
- Paspalum vaginatum Sw. (syn. P. distichum, P. littorale) – water finger-grass
- Paspalum virgatum
- Paspalum wullschlaegelii

== Formerly placed here ==
- Axonopus compressus (broad-leaved carpetgrass), as P. compressum, P. platycaule, P. platycaulon
- Axonopus fissifolius (narrow-leaved carpetgrass), as P. fissifolium
- Digitaria exilis (fonio), as P. exile
