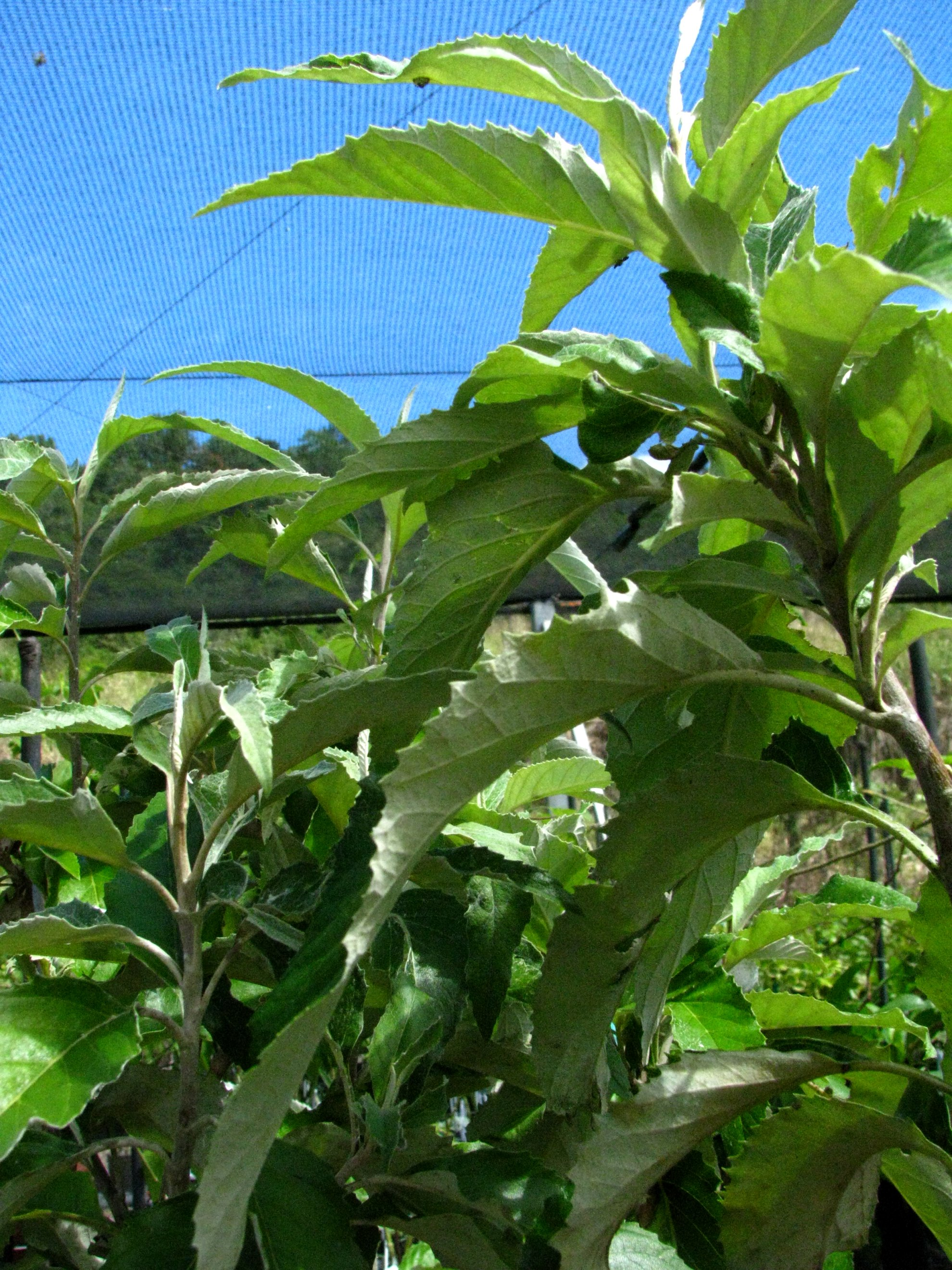

Conservation status
- Critically Imperiled (NatureServe)

Scientific classification
- Kingdom: Plantae
- Clade: Tracheophytes
- Clade: Angiosperms
- Clade: Eudicots
- Clade: Asterids
- Order: Asterales
- Family: Asteraceae
- Genus: Remya
- Species: R. kauaiensis

Binomial name
- Remya kauaiensis Hillebr.

= Remya kauaiensis =

Species of plant

Remya kauaiensis is a rare species of flowering plant in the family Asteraceae, known by the common name of Kauai remya. It is endemic to Hawaii, where it is known only from the island of Kauai. It is threatened by the degradation of its habitat. It is a federally listed endangered species of the United States.

This shrub usually grows up to about 90 centimeters (35 in) tall, but can reach up to 4 meters (13 ft). It has many vine-like spreading branches with fuzzy tips. The toothed leaves are green on the upper surfaces and are coated in white hairs on the undersides. The inflorescence is a panicle of flower heads. The flowers are probably pollinated by insects and the seeds are likely dispersed by wind or water.

This plant is one of three species in Remya, a genus endemic to Hawaii, and one of the two Remya that are limited to the island of Kauai. For a time this species was feared extinct, but it was rediscovered in the 1980s. As of 2003 there were 17 populations for a total of not more than 114 individuals.

The populations are distributed through several valleys and canyons on Kauai. It grows on steep canyon walls and in gulches, often on north-facing slopes. It may grow by rivers and next to waterfalls. It can generally be found in forested habitat dominated by koa and ohia trees. Other plants in the habitat include kauila, maile, ahakea lau lii, akoko, laukea, uki uki, uluhe, aalii, manono, pukiawe, uahiapele, kolea, olopua, and alaa.

Threats to this species include destruction of the habitat by introduced species of ungulates such as feral pigs, feral goats, cattle, and deer. Invasive plant species are also a threat, including narrow-leaved carpetgrass, hammock fern, airplant, daisy fleabane, blackberry, silk oak, lantana, banana poka, Kahili ginger, sourbush, and basketgrass. Other threats include erosion and fire, and because the plant is already rare, it is threatened with extinction by any one large event, such as a hurricane.

Conservation efforts include the collection of seeds for storage and the propagation of seedlings.
