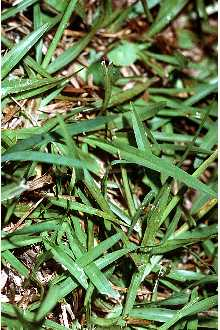
- Axonopus fissifolius

Scientific classification
- Kingdom: Plantae
- Clade: Tracheophytes
- Clade: Angiosperms
- Clade: Monocots
- Clade: Commelinids
- Order: Poales
- Family: Poaceae
- Subfamily: Panicoideae
- Supertribe: Andropogonodae
- Tribe: Paspaleae
- Subtribe: Paspalinae
- Genus: Axonopus; P.Beauv. 1812, not Hook.f. 1896 nor (Steud.) Chase 1911

Type species
- Axonopus aureus P.Beauv.

Synonyms
- Anastrophus Schltdl.; Axonopus sect. Cabrera (Lag.) Chase; Cabrera Lag.; Centrochloa Swallen; Lappagopsis Steud.; Ophiochloa Filg.; Panicum sect. Cabrera (Lag.) Trin.; Panicum sect. Harpostachys Döll; Paspalum sect. Cabrera (Lag.) Döll

= Axonopus =

Carpet grass

Genus of grasses

Axonopus is a genus of plants in the grass family, known generally as carpet grass. They are native primarily to the tropical and subtropical regions of the Americas with one species in tropical Africa and another on Easter Island. They are sometimes rhizomatous and many are tolerant of periodic submersion.

== Species ==
As of November 2024, Plants of the World Online accepted 78 species:

- Axonopus amapaensis G.A.Black – Brazil
- Axonopus anceps (Mez) Hitchc. – Trinidad-Tobago, northern South America
- Axonopus andinus G.A.Black – Bolivia
- Axonopus argentinus Parodi – Argentina, Paraguay, Uruguay, Brazil
- Axonopus aureus P.Beauv. – from Chiapas to Bolivia
- Axonopus boliviensis Renvoize – Bolivia
- Axonopus brasiliensis (Spreng.) Kuhlm. – Bolivia, Brazil, Paraguay
- Axonopus bryoides (G.H.Rua, R.C.Oliveira & Valls) Alicia López & Morrone
- Axonopus capillaris (Lam.) Chase – from Guatemala to Brazil
- Axonopus casiquiarensis Davidse – Colombia, Venezuela
- Axonopus caulescens (Mez) Henrard – from Guyana to Bolivia
- Axonopus centralis Chase – from Nayarit to Paraíba
- Axonopus chaseae G.A.Black – Bahia, Minas Gerais
- Axonopus chimantensis Davidse – Venezuela
- Axonopus chrysoblepharis (Lag.) Chase – from Chiapas to Paraguay
- Axonopus ciliatifolius Swallen – Belize
- Axonopus comans (Trin. ex Döll) Kuhlm. – Brazil, Paraguay
- Axonopus comatus (Mez) Swallen – Venezuela, Brazil
- Axonopus complanatus (Nees ex Trin.) Dedecca – Brazil
- Axonopus compressus (Sw.) P.Beauv. – USA (TX to SC), West Indies, much of Latin America
- Axonopus conduplicatus G.A.Black – Brazil
- Axonopus cuatrecasasii G.A.Black – Colombia, Venezuela, Bolivia
- Axonopus debilis G.A.Black – Cuba
- Axonopus elegantulus (J.Presl) Hitchc. – Ecuador, Peru, Bolivia
- Axonopus eminens (Nees) G.A.Black – from Guyana to Bolivia
- Axonopus equitans Hitchc. & Chase – Trinidad-Tobago, northern South America
- Axonopus fastigiatus (Nees ex Trin.) Kuhlm. – Brazil
- Axonopus fissifolius (Raddi) Kuhlm. – USA (TX to VA), West Indies, much of Latin America
- Axonopus flabelliformis Swallen – from Guyana to Bolivia
- Axonopus flexuosus (Peter) Troupin – tropical Africa
- Axonopus furcatus (Flüggé) Hitchc. – USA (TX to MD), Cuba, Brazil, Argentina
- Axonopus fusiformis Valls & A.D.Silveira
- Axonopus gracilis G.Black – Venezuela
- Axonopus grandifolius Renvoize – Bahia
- Axonopus graniticola P.L.Viana
- Axonopus herzogii (Hack.) Hitchc. – Brazil, Bolivia
- Axonopus hoehnei G.A.Black – Pará
- Axonopus hydrolithicus (Filg., Davidse & Zuloaga) Alicia López & Morrone
- Axonopus jeanyae Davidse – Panama
- Axonopus junciformis G.A.Black – Mato Grosso
- Axonopus kuhlmannii G.A.Black – Brazil, Bolivia
- Axonopus laegaardii Gir.-Cañas
- Axonopus laxiflorus (Trin.) Chase – Minas Gerais
- Axonopus laxus Luces – Venezuela
- Axonopus leptostachyus (Flüggé) Hitchc. – Trinidad-Tobago, South America
- Axonopus longispicus (Döll) Kuhlm. – northeastern South America
- Axonopus magallanesiae Gir.-Cañas – Venezuela
- Axonopus marginatus (Trin.) Chase ex Hitchc. – Brazil, Bolivia, Paraguay, Argentina
- Axonopus morronei Gir.-Cañas – Colombia
- Axonopus oiapocensis G.A.Black – Amapá, French Guiana
- Axonopus orinocensis Gir.-Cañas
- Axonopus paschalis (Stapf) Pilg. – Easter Island
- Axonopus passourae G.A.Black – French Guiana
- Axonopus pennellii G.A.Black – Venezuela, Colombia
- Axonopus piccae Gir.-Cañas – Venezuela, Colombia
- Axonopus poiophyllus Chase – Mesoamerica, Colombia
- Axonopus polydactylus (Steud.) Dedecca – Brazil
- Axonopus polystachyus G.A.Black – Brazil
- Axonopus pressus (Nees ex Steud.) Parodi – Brazil, Bolivia, Paraguay
- Axonopus pubivaginatus Henrard – northeastern South America
- Axonopus purpusii (Mez) Chase – from Central Mexico to Paraguay
- Axonopus ramosus Swallen – Amapá, Fr Guiana, Suriname, Venezuela
- Axonopus rosei (Scribn. & Merr.) Chase – Nayarit
- Axonopus rupestris Davidse – Brazil
- Axonopus schultesii G.A.Black – Venezuela, Colombia
- Axonopus scoparius (Flüggé) Kuhlm. – from northern Mexico to Brazil
- Axonopus senescens (Döll) Henrard – Amapá, Fr Guiana, Colombia
- Axonopus siccus (Nees) Kuhlm. – Brazil, Bolivia, Paraguay, Uruguay, Argentina
- Axonopus singularis (Swallen) Alicia López & Morrone
- Axonopus steyermarkii Swallen – Venezuela
- Axonopus succulentus G.A.Black – Paraguay
- Axonopus suffultiformis G.Black – Venezuela
- Axonopus suffultus (J.C.Mikan ex Trin.) Parodi – Brazil, Paraguay, Uruguay, Argentina
- Axonopus surinamensis (Hochst. ex Steud.) Henrard – northeastern South America
- Axonopus triglochinoides (Mez) Dedecca – Amazon Basin
- Axonopus volcanicus R.W.Pohl – Costa Rica
- Axonopus yutajensis G.Black – Venezuela
- Axonopus zuloagae Gir.-Cañas – Colombia

Formerly included

see Alloteropsis, Digitaria, Panicum, Paspalum and Sporobolus
- Axonopus corymbosus - Digitaria compacta
- Axonopus digitatus - Digitaria nuda
- Axonopus ecklonianus - Adenochloa ecklonii
- Axonopus latifolius - Alloteropsis cimicina
- Axonopus maidenianus - Alloteropsis semialata
- Axonopus paniceus - Digitaria panicea
- Axonopus paniculatus - Alloteropsis paniculata
- Axonopus poiretii - Sporobolus junceus
- Axonopus proximus - Paspalum ellipticum
- Axonopus repens - Paspalum repens
- Axonopus semialatus - Alloteropsis semialata

== See also ==
- List of Poaceae genera
