= Louisiana grass =

Louisiana grass may refer to:

- Axonopus compressus
- Axonopus fissifolius
- Paspalum

== See also ==
- List of U.S. state grasses
