= Remya mauiensis =

Conservation status
- Critically Imperiled (NatureServe)

Scientific classification
- Kingdom: Plantae
- Clade: Tracheophytes
- Clade: Angiosperms
- Clade: Eudicots
- Clade: Asterids
- Order: Asterales
- Family: Asteraceae
- Genus: Remya
- Species: R. mauiensis

Binomial name
- Remya mauiensis Hillebr.

Species of plant

Remya mauiensis is a rare species of flowering plant in the family Asteraceae known by the common name Maui remya. It is endemic to Hawaii, where it is known only from the island of Maui. It is threatened by the degradation of its habitat. It is a federally listed endangered species of the United States.

This shrub grows one to two meters tall, the branches often climbing over other vegetation. It produces dark yellow flower heads.

This plant is one of three species in Remya, a genus endemic to Hawaii, the only one that is not limited to the island of Kauai. There are about six populations of the plant containing about 320 individuals.

Threats to this species include degradation of the habitat by invasive plant species, including daisy fleabane, silk oak, lantana, and basketgrass. Fire is also a threat to the habitat.
