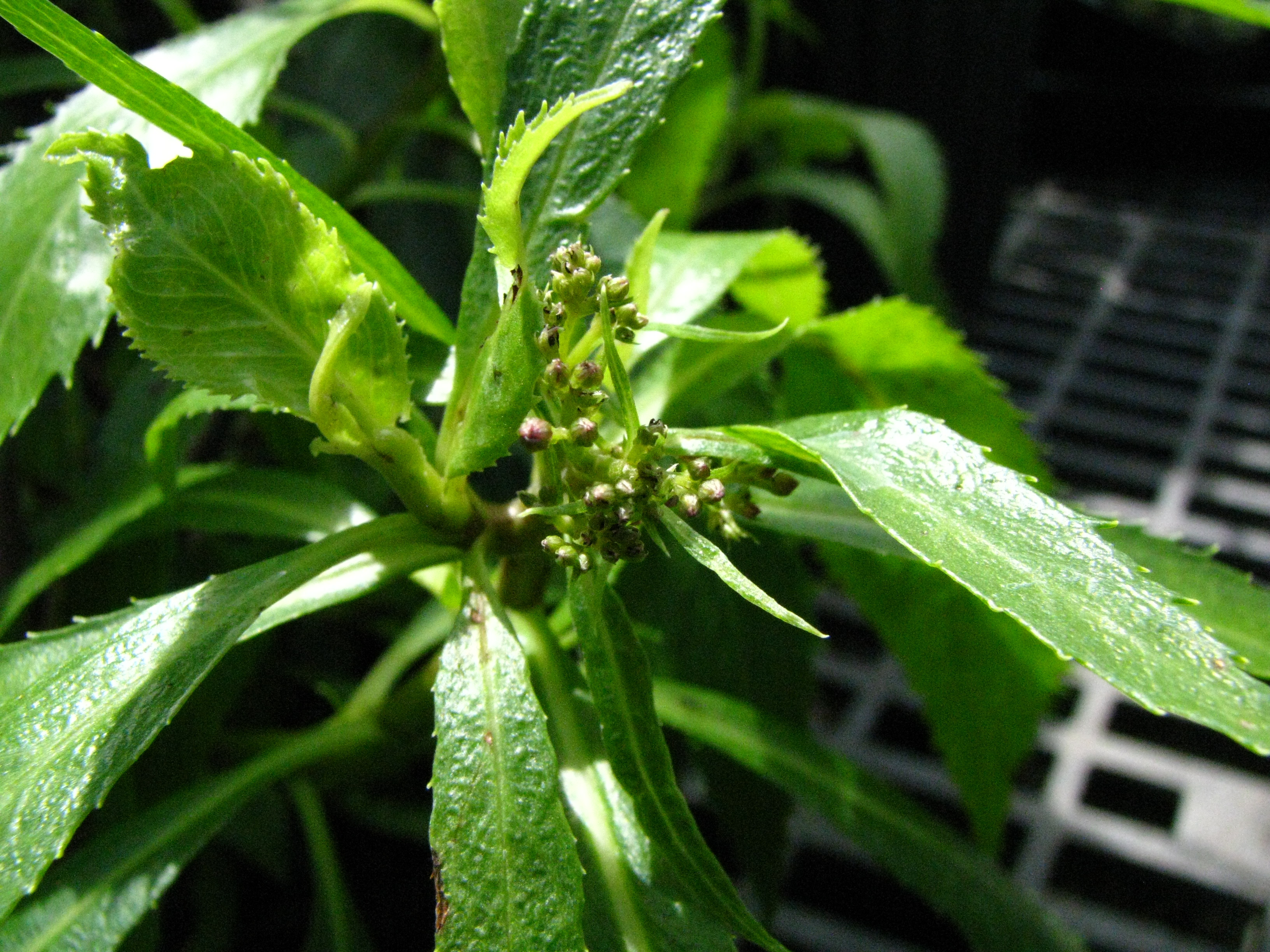

Conservation status
- Critically Imperiled (NatureServe)

Scientific classification
- Kingdom: Plantae
- Clade: Tracheophytes
- Clade: Angiosperms
- Clade: Eudicots
- Clade: Asterids
- Order: Asterales
- Family: Asteraceae
- Genus: Remya
- Species: R. montgomeryi

Binomial name
- Remya montgomeryi W.L.Wagner & D.R.Herbst

= Remya montgomeryi =

Species of plant

Remya montgomeryi is a rare species of flowering plant in the family Asteraceae known by the common name Kalalau Valley remya. It is endemic to Hawaii, where it is known only from the island of Kauai. It is threatened by the degradation of its habitat. It is a federally listed endangered species of the United States.

This shrub grows up to a meter tall and bears open panicles of flower heads. This plant is one of three species in Remya, a genus endemic to Hawaii, and one of the two Remya that are limited to the island of Kauai. This plant was discovered in 1985 and described in 1987. By 2003 there were six populations known for a total of about 143 individuals.

Threats to this species include the destruction of the habitat by introduced species of ungulates such as feral pigs, feral goats, and deer. Invasive plant species are also a threat, including downy wood fern, velvet grass, airplant, daisy fleabane, blackberry, lantana, banana poka, honeysuckle, yellow foxtail, and vasey grass.
