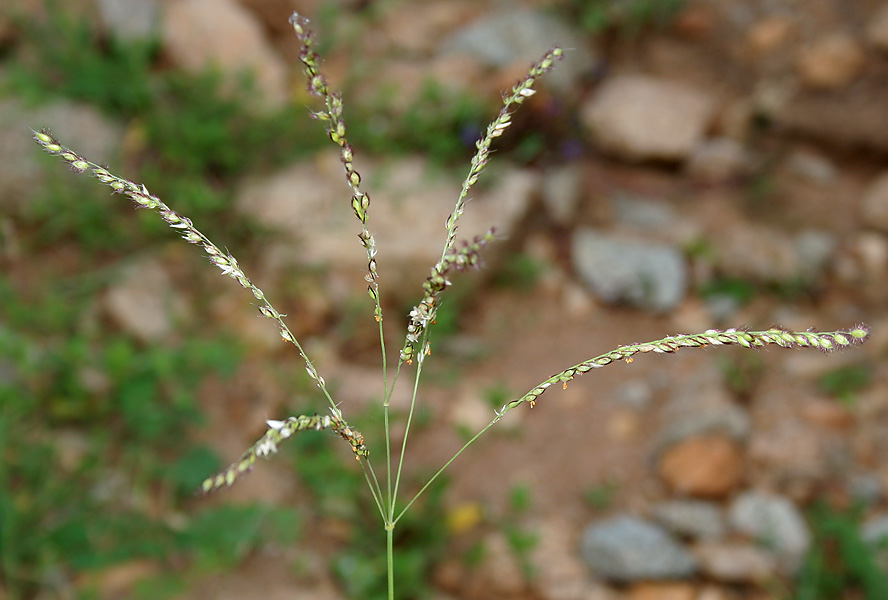
- Alloteropsis cimicina

Scientific classification
- Kingdom: Plantae
- Clade: Tracheophytes
- Clade: Angiosperms
- Clade: Monocots
- Clade: Commelinids
- Order: Poales
- Family: Poaceae
- Subfamily: Panicoideae
- Supertribe: Panicodae
- Tribe: Paniceae
- Subtribe: Boivinellinae
- Genus: Alloteropsis; C.Presl

Type species
- Alloteropsis distachya (syn. of A. semialata) C.Presl

Synonyms
- Coridochloa Nees; Bluffia Nees; Holosetum Steud.; Pterochlaena Chiov.; Mezochloa Butzin

= Alloteropsis =

Genus of grasses

Alloteropsis (from the Greek allotrios ("strange") and opsis ("appearance")) is a genus of Old World plants in the grass family.

The group is widely distributed in tropical and subtropical parts of Africa, Asia and Australia, as well as on certain islands in the Indian and Pacific Oceans. The genus is unusual among plants in that it includes species with both C_{3} and C_{4} photosynthetic pathways, and ongoing research is investigating these taxa as a case study in how carbon concentrating mechanisms for photosynthesis evolve in land plants.

== Photosynthetic pathway evolution ==
Most of the species of Alloteropsis use variants of the C_{4} photosynthetic pathway, but A. semialata ssp. eckloniana uses the C_{3} photosynthetic pathway. Phylogenetic reconstructions of the evolutionary relationships between these species have led to two hypotheses about how photosynthetic pathways have evolved within the group. First, C_{4} photosynthesis evolved in three lineages within this group, leading to independently derived realisations of this pathway (the hypothesis of multiple C_{4} origins). Secondly, that there was a single origin of C_{4} photosynthesis within the genus, and the C_{3} taxon, A. s. ecklonia, was subsequently derived from a C_{4} ancestor (the reversion hypothesis). Since C_{4} photosynthesis is a complex trait, its evolution followed by a reversion to the ancestral type of C_{3} photosynthesis would represent an exception to Dollo's law.

The reversion hypothesis is the most parsimonious explanation of phylogenetic relationships within Alloteropsis. However, direct evidence for the hypothesis, in the form of C_{4} genes or pseudogenes in the C_{3} taxon, is currently lacking. Instead, two pieces of evidence better support the hypothesis of multiple C_{4} origins. First, different variants of C_{4} leaf anatomy are found in three different Alloteropsis lineages. Secondly, key C_{4} enzymes (PEPC and PEPCK) were recruited multiple times to function in C_{4} biochemistry across independent lineages.

C_{4} photosynthetic pathway evolution in Alloteropsis also represents an example of adaptive evolution via horizontal gene transfer in eukaryotes. It is the first such example of gene transfer between plant species that are not in direct physical contact (as in a host-parasite relationship). In each case, genes adapted for an important function in C_{4} photosynthesis have been transferred from grass lineages that diverged from Alloteropsis more than 20 million years ago, and independently evolved C_{4} photosynthesis. Horizontally inherited genes encode the photosynthesis enzymes PEPC and PEPCK. All other genes expressed in the mature C_{4} leaf of A. s. semialata were vertically inherited from a common ancestor with the C_{3} taxon A. s. eckloniana.

== Diversity ==
Accepted species

- Alloteropsis angusta Stapf - Nigeria, Cameroon, Zaire, Kenya, Uganda, Zambia, Angola
- Alloteropsis cimicina (L.) Stapf - sub-Saharan Africa, Indian subcontinent, Madagascar, Hainan, Southeast Asia, northern Australia; sparingly naturalized in scattered locations in the United States (Mississippi, Florida, Maryland).
- Alloteropsis paniculata (Benth.) Stapf - tropical Africa, Madagascar, Mauritius, Réunion
- Alloteropsis papillosa Clayton - Kenya, Tanzania, Mozambique, Limpopo, Mpumalanga, KwaZulu-Natal
- Alloteropsis semialata (R.Br.) Hitchc. - sub-Saharan Africa, Indian subcontinent, Madagascar, China, Southeast Asia, northern Australia, New Guinea, Solomon Islands, New Caledonia

Formerly included

see Mayariochloa Scutachne

- Alloteropsis amphistemon - Mayariochloa amphistemon
- Alloteropsis dura - Scutachne dura

== See also ==
- List of Poaceae genera
