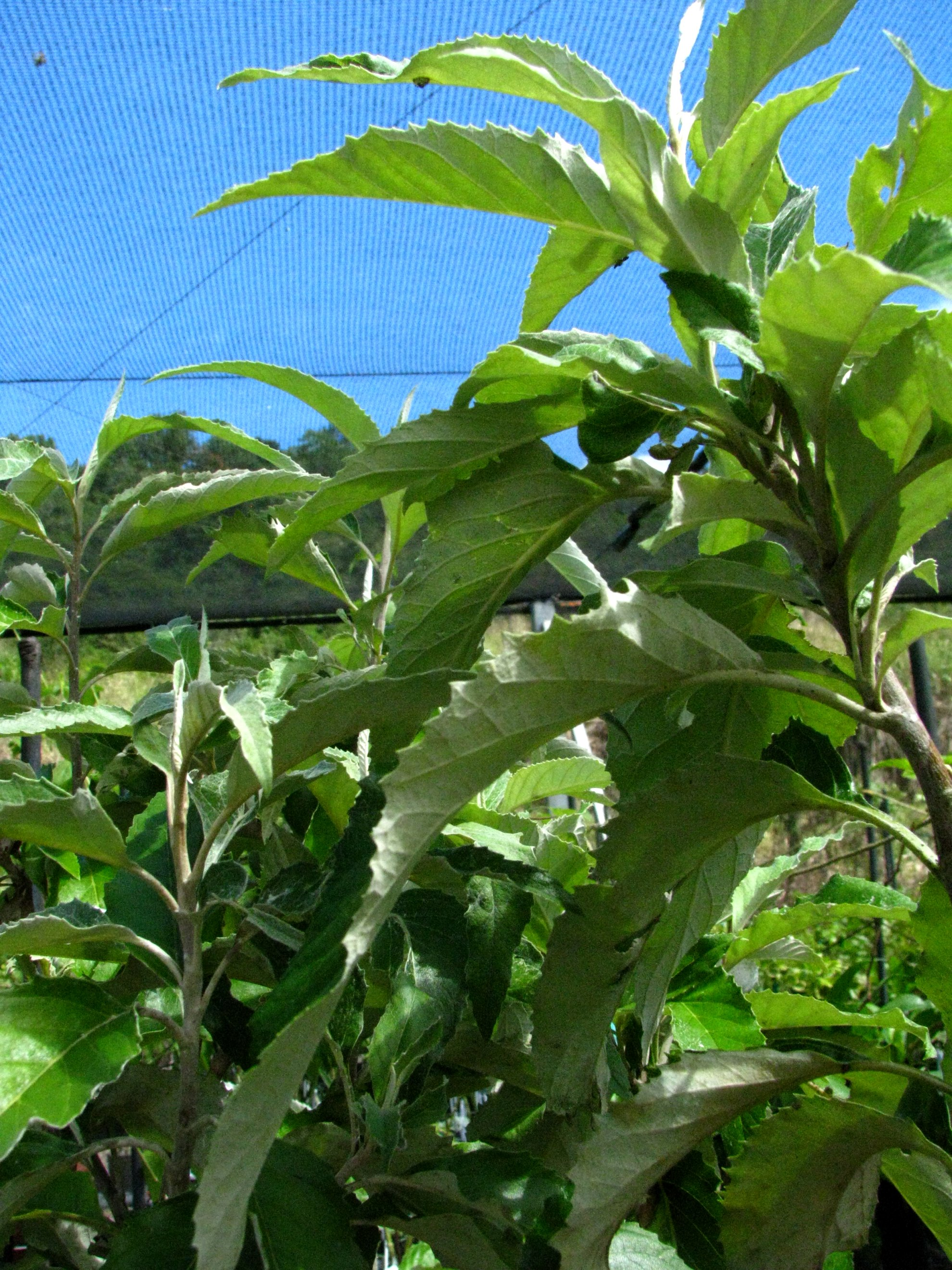
- Remya kauaiensis

Scientific classification
- Kingdom: Plantae
- Clade: Tracheophytes
- Clade: Angiosperms
- Clade: Eudicots
- Clade: Asterids
- Order: Asterales
- Family: Asteraceae
- Subfamily: Asteroideae
- Tribe: Astereae
- Subtribe: Brachyscominae
- Genus: Remya; Hillebr. ex Benth. & Hook.f.

= Remya (plant) =

Genus of plants

Remya is a genus of Hawaiian plants in the tribe Astereae within the family Asteraceae.

Species

- Remya kauaiensis Hillebr. - Kauaʻi
- Remya mauiensis Hillebr. - Maui
- Remya montgomeryi W.L.Wagner & D.R.Herbst - Kauaʻi
