= Axonopus singularis =

Scientific classification
- Kingdom: Plantae
- Clade: Tracheophytes
- Clade: Angiosperms
- Clade: Monocots
- Clade: Commelinids
- Order: Poales
- Family: Poaceae
- Subfamily: Panicoideae
- Genus: Axonopus
- Species: A. singularis

Binomial name
- Axonopus singularis (Swallen) Alicia López & Morrone

Synonyms
- Centrochloa singularis Swallen

Species of grass

Axonopus singularis is a species of flowering plant in the grass family Poaceae, native to Brazil (the states of Maranhão and Goiás). When placed in the monotypic genus Centrochloa as Centrochloa singularis, it was the only species.

== Taxonomy ==
The species was first described by Jason Richard Swallen in 1935 as Centrochloa singularis. It was the only species in the monotypic genus Centrochloa. It was transferred to the genus Axonopus in 2012, a placement accepted by Plants of the World Online as of November 2024.
