= Scutachne =

Scientific classification
- Kingdom: Plantae
- Clade: Tracheophytes
- Clade: Angiosperms
- Clade: Monocots
- Clade: Commelinids
- Order: Poales
- Family: Poaceae
- Subfamily: Panicoideae
- Supertribe: Panicodae
- Tribe: Paniceae
- Subtribe: Melinidinae
- Genus: Scutachne; Hitchc. & Chase
- Species: S. dura

Binomial name
- Scutachne dura (Griseb.) Hitchc. & Chase

Synonyms
- Panicum durum Griseb.; Alloteropsis dura (Griseb.) Hitchc.

Genus of grasses

Scutachne is a genus of plants in the grass family Poaceae. The only known species is Scutachne dura, it is native to Cuba, Jamaica, and Hispaniola (Haiti + Dominican Republic).

== See also ==
- Mayariochloa amphistemon, formerly Scutachne amphistemon
