= Wilhelm Friedrich Karwinsky von Karwin =

Bavarian naturalist

Wilhelm Friedrich Karwinsky von Karwin (also Karwinski)
- Born: 19 February 1780; Keszthely
- Died: 2 March 1855 (aged 75); Munich
- Scientific career
- Fields: natural history collecting

Wilhelm Friedrich Karwinsky von Karwin (19 February 1780 – 2 March 1855) was a Bavarian naturalist who collected plants and animals in Brazil (1821–1826) and Mexico (1826–1831, 1840). He was born in Keszthely, now in Hungary, and died in Munich. Many plants and animals are named in his honour, including the genus Karwinskia and the species Erigeron karvinskianus (Mexican daisy) and Smyrna karwinskii (the butterfly Karwinski's beauty).
