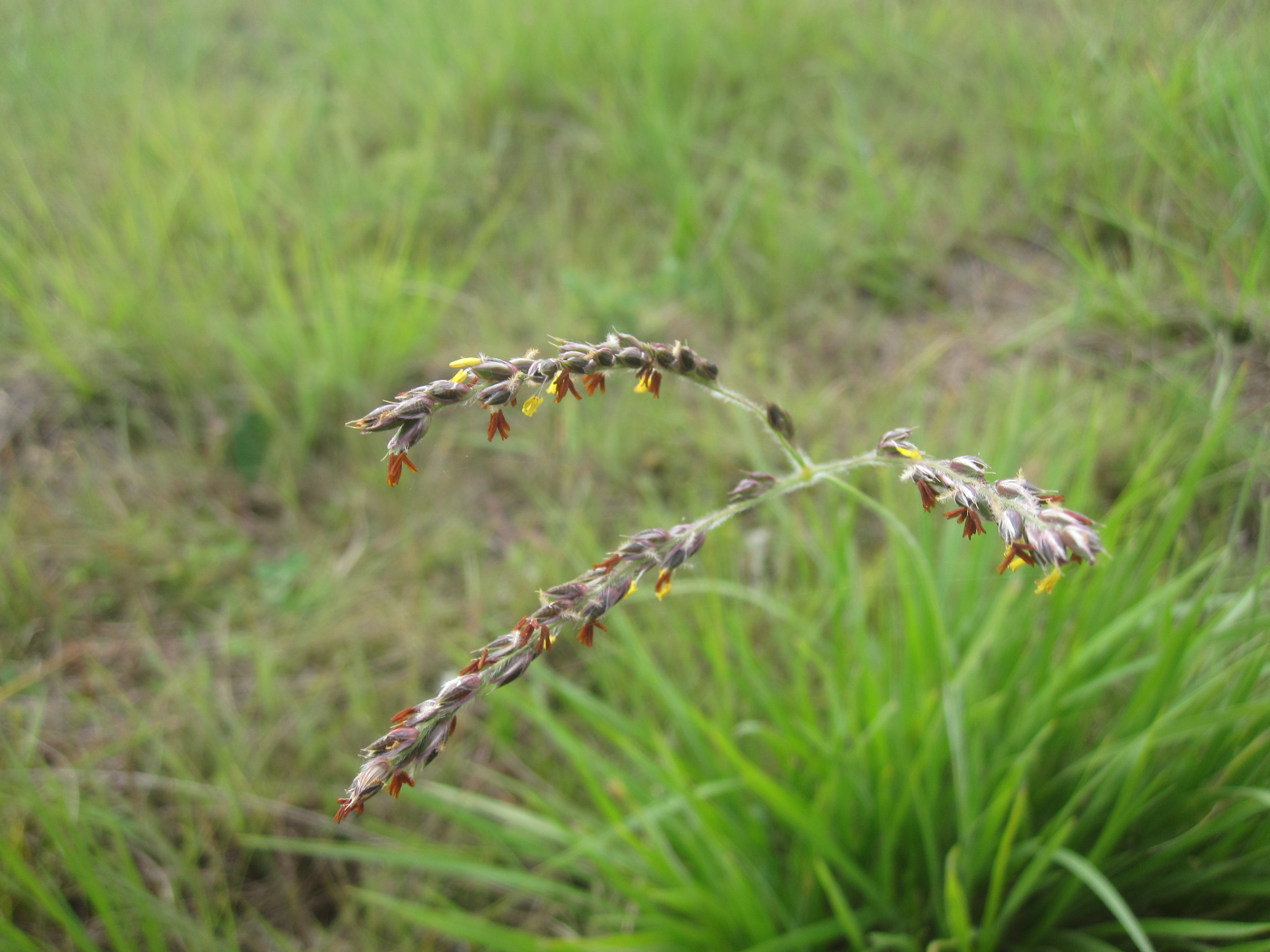

Scientific classification
- Kingdom: Plantae
- Clade: Tracheophytes
- Clade: Angiosperms
- Clade: Monocots
- Clade: Commelinids
- Order: Poales
- Family: Poaceae
- Subfamily: Panicoideae
- Genus: Alloteropsis
- Species: A. semialata

Binomial name
- Alloteropsis semialata (R.Br.) Hitchc.

Synonyms
- Panicum semialatum R.Br.; Urochloa semialata (R.Br.) Kunth; Oplismenus semialatus (R.Br.) Desv.; Coridochloa semialata (R.Br.) Nees ex Benth.; Axonopus semialatus (R.Br.) Hook.f.; Paspalum semialatum (R.Br.) Eyles; Bluffia eckloniana Nees; Alloteropsis eckloniana (Nees) Hitchc.; Alloteropsis distachya J.Presl; Aira viatica Griff.; Panicum viaticum Griff.; Holosetum philippicum Steud.; Arundinella schultzii Benth.; Panicum philippicum (Steud.) Náves ex Fern.-Vill.; Pterochlaena catangensis Chiov.; Axonopus maidenianus Domin; Alloteropsis homblei Robyns; Alloteropsis gwebiensis Stent & J.M.Rattray

= Alloteropsis semialata =

Black seed grass Cockatoo grass

Species of grass

Alloteropsis semialata, known commonly as black seed grass, cockatoo grass, donkersaad gras, swartsaadgras, tweevingergras, and isi quinti, is a perennial grass found in tropical regions of Asia, Africa, Madagascar, and Australasia.

== Description ==
This plant typically reaches 20–150 centimetres (8–59 in) tall, growing from a short, white rhizome. The leaf blades are typically 10–50 cm (4–19 1/2 in) long and 1–10 millimetres (1/16–3/8 in) wide. The plant produces 2-flowered fertile spikelets.

== Etymology ==
The genus name Allopteropsis comes from the Greek words "allotrios", meaning "belonging to another", and "opsis", meaning appearance. The specific epithet semialata comes from the Latin "semi" (half) and "ala" (wing), referring to the winged margins of the upper glume.

== Variation ==
The species has two subspecies including A. semialata subsp. semialata, which uses the C4 photosynthetic pathway, and A. semialata subsp. eckloniana, which uses the C3 photosynthetic pathway. As the only plant species known to use both pathways, it is an important model for the study of the evolution of photosynthesis. There are a wide range of intermediate phenotypes, including that of C2 photosynthesis.

The species has been found in a polyploid series with diploid, tetraploid, hexaploid, octoploid and dodecaploid individuals. All members of the C3 subspecies are diploid and there are no diploid individuals outside of that subspecies.

== Distribution and habitat ==
It is distributed across much of tropical and subtropical Asia, Africa, Madagascar, Australia, and Papuasia.

== Ecology ==
The seeds of this species are an important component of the wet-season diet of many granivorous finches and parrots. The rhizomes are part of the dry-season diet of some animals.
