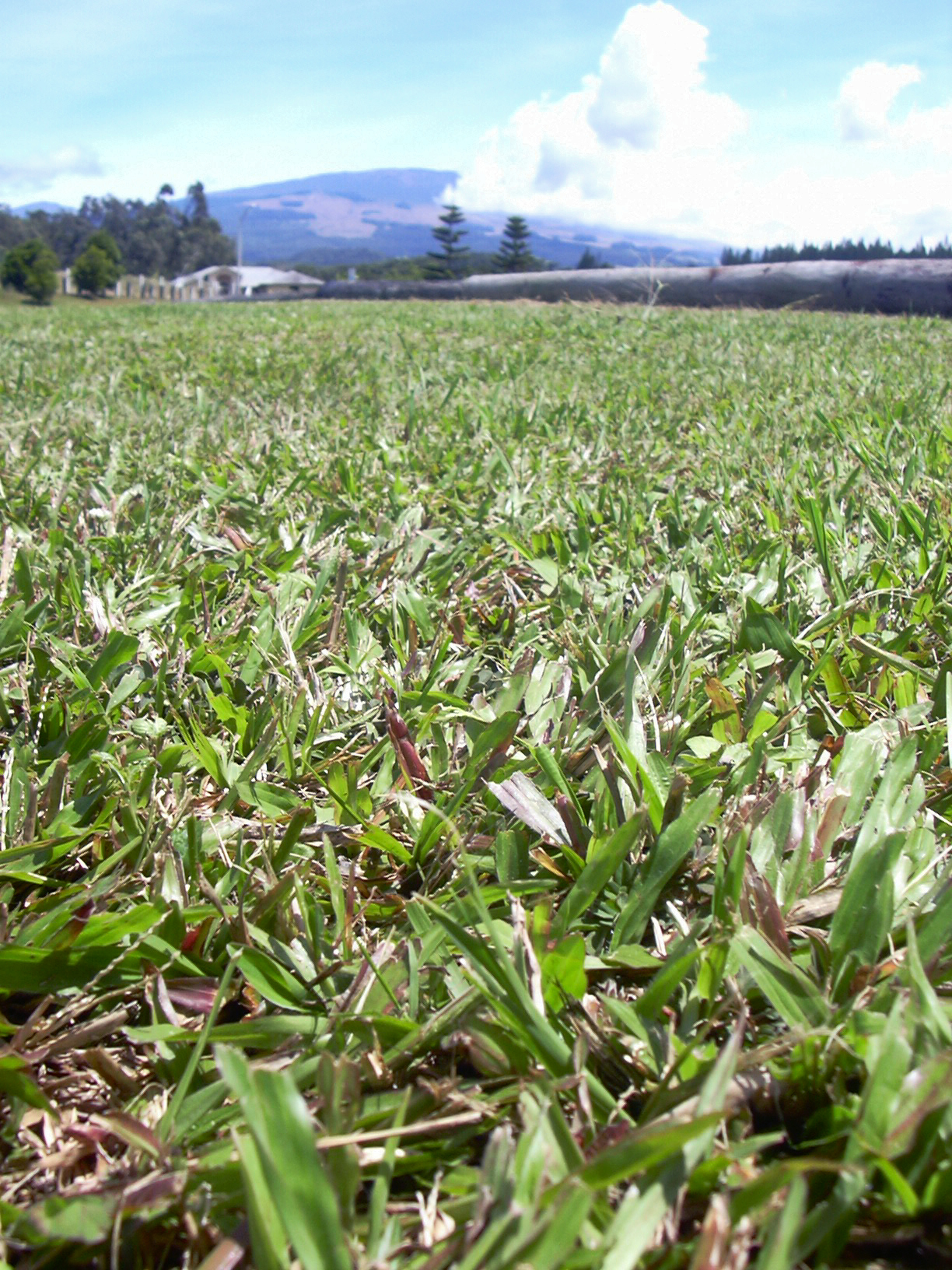

Conservation status
- Secure (NatureServe)

Scientific classification
- Kingdom: Plantae
- Clade: Tracheophytes
- Clade: Angiosperms
- Clade: Monocots
- Clade: Commelinids
- Order: Poales
- Family: Poaceae
- Subfamily: Panicoideae
- Genus: Axonopus
- Species: A. compressus

Binomial name
- Axonopus compressus (Sw.) P.Beauv.

Synonyms
- Axonopus compressus (Sw.) P.Beauv. var. australis G.A.Black; Milium compressum Sw.; Paspalum compressum (Sw.) Nees; Paspalum platycaule Willd. ex Steud.; Paspalum platycaulon Poir.

= Axonopus compressus =

Species of plant

Axonopus compressus is a species of grass. It is often used as a permanent pasture, groundcover, and turf in moist, low fertility soils, particularly in shaded situations. It is generally too low-growing to be useful in cut-and-carry systems or for fodder conservation.

While not optimal, it is occasionally used for football fields especially those which are not for elite competitions or where only a low level of maintenance can be done.

== Taxonomy ==
Axonopus compressus is known by several common names including broadleaf carpetgrass, flat-joint carpet grass, American carpet grass, tropical carpet grass, blanket grass, lawn grass, Louisiana grass, savanna grass, and Kearsney grass.
