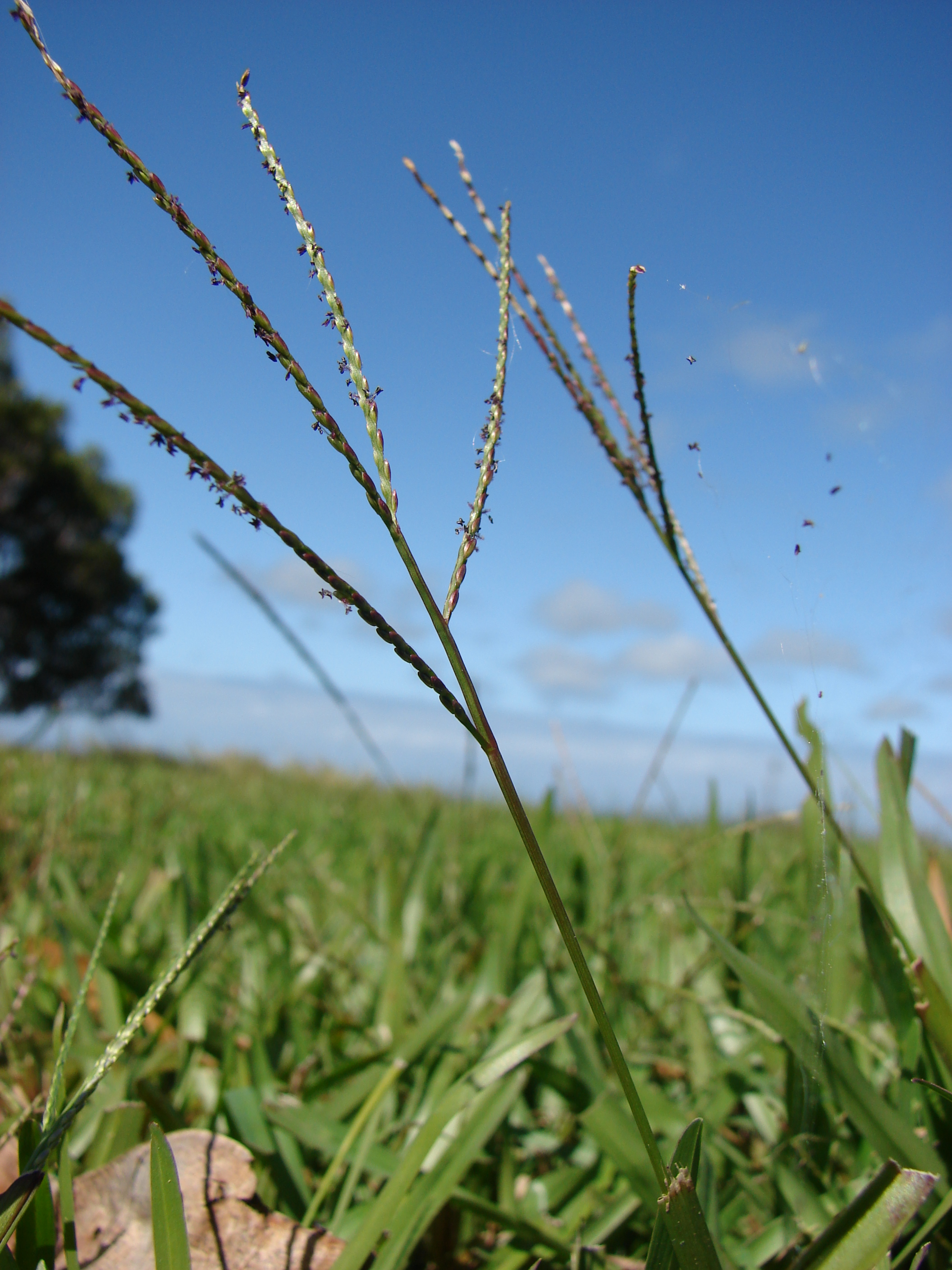

Conservation status
- Secure (NatureServe)

Scientific classification
- Kingdom: Plantae
- Clade: Tracheophytes
- Clade: Angiosperms
- Clade: Monocots
- Clade: Commelinids
- Order: Poales
- Family: Poaceae
- Subfamily: Panicoideae
- Genus: Axonopus
- Species: A. fissifolius

Binomial name
- Axonopus fissifolius (Raddi) Kuhlm.

Synonyms
- Axonopus affinis Paspalum fissifolium

= Axonopus fissifolius =

Species of plant

Axonopus fissifolius is a grass species which is often used as permanent pasture.

Common names include common carpetgrass, caratao grass, and Louisiana grass in the United States, and mat grass, narrow-leaved carpet grass, and Durrington grass in Australia.

== Description ==
The leaf blades of A. fissifolius may be either folded or flat, and have find hairs along the margin. They may become purple or reddish in color when mature.

== Distribution and habitat ==
This species' native range encompasses the southeastern United States (from Virginia westward to Texas), Grenada in the Caribbean, and throughout Central and South America. It has been introduced to regions within Asia, Africa, Australia and the Pacific Islands.

A. fissifolius may be found in habitat types such as sandy forests, pine flatwoods, and grassland environments (specifically those with poor drainage).

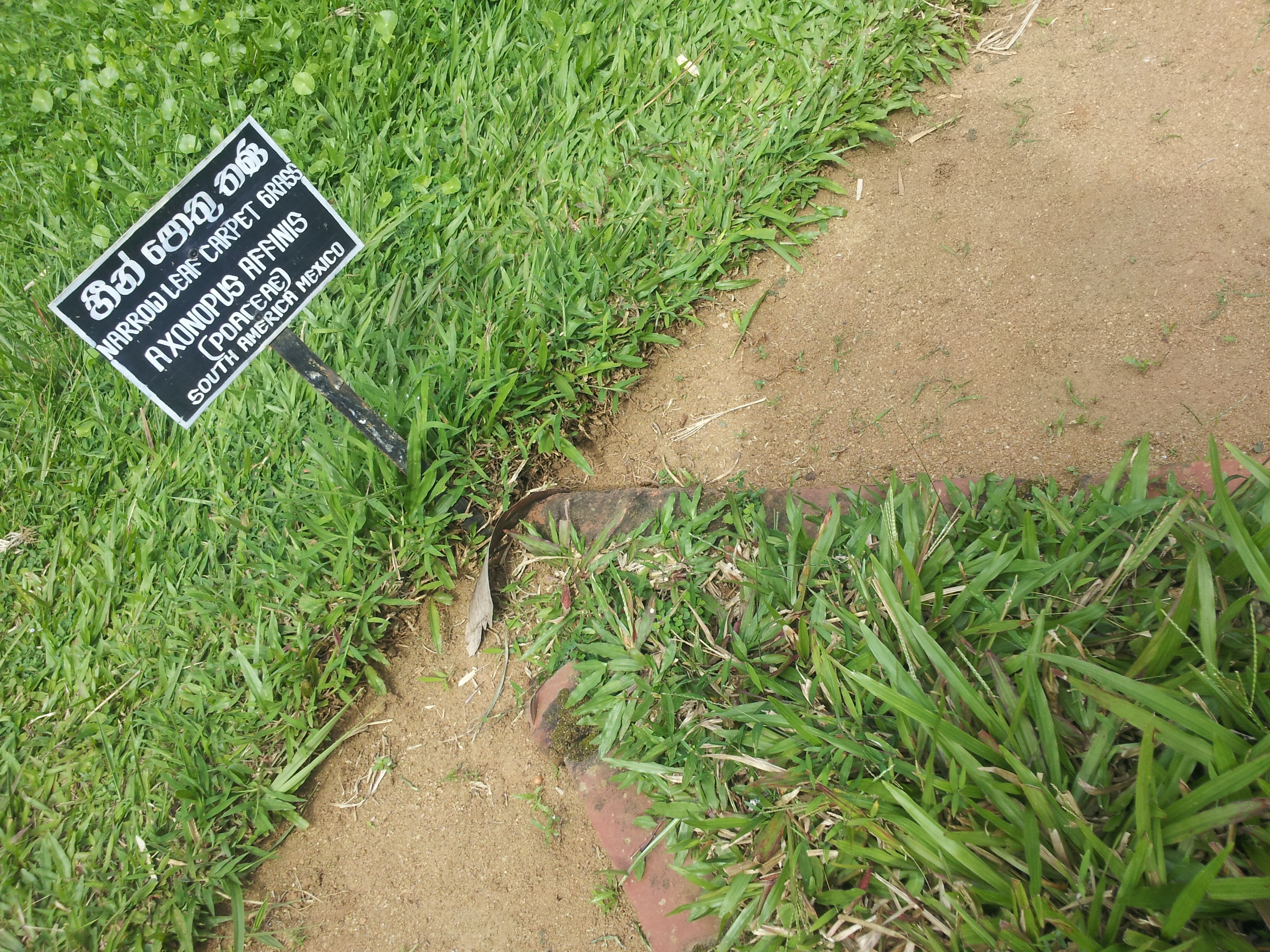
at Peradeniya Royal Botanical Garden, Sri Lanka
