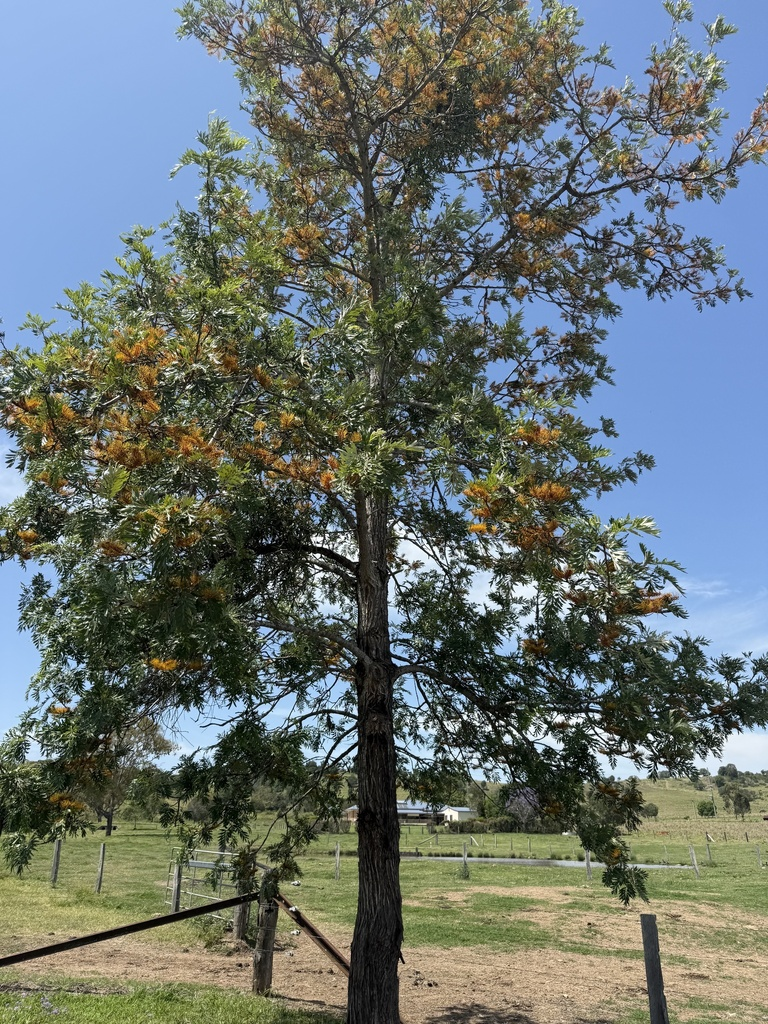
- In Vernor

Scientific classification
- Kingdom: Plantae
- Clade: Embryophytes
- Clade: Tracheophytes
- Clade: Angiosperms
- Clade: Eudicots
- Order: Proteales
- Family: Proteaceae
- Genus: Grevillea
- Species: G. robusta

Binomial name
- Grevillea robusta A.Cunn. ex R.Br.

= Grevillea robusta =

Silky oak

Species of shrub endemic to eastern Australia

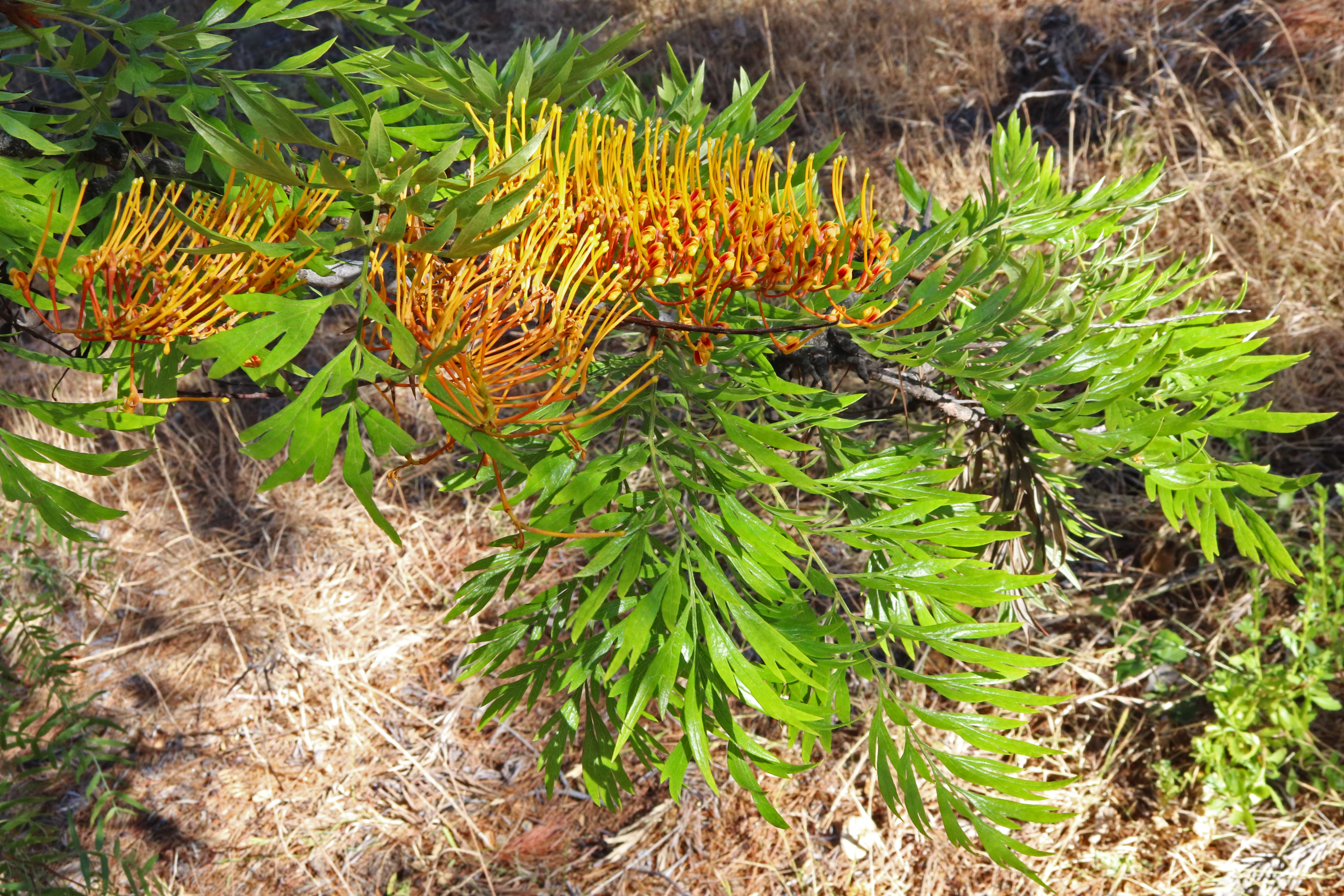
Leaves and flowers

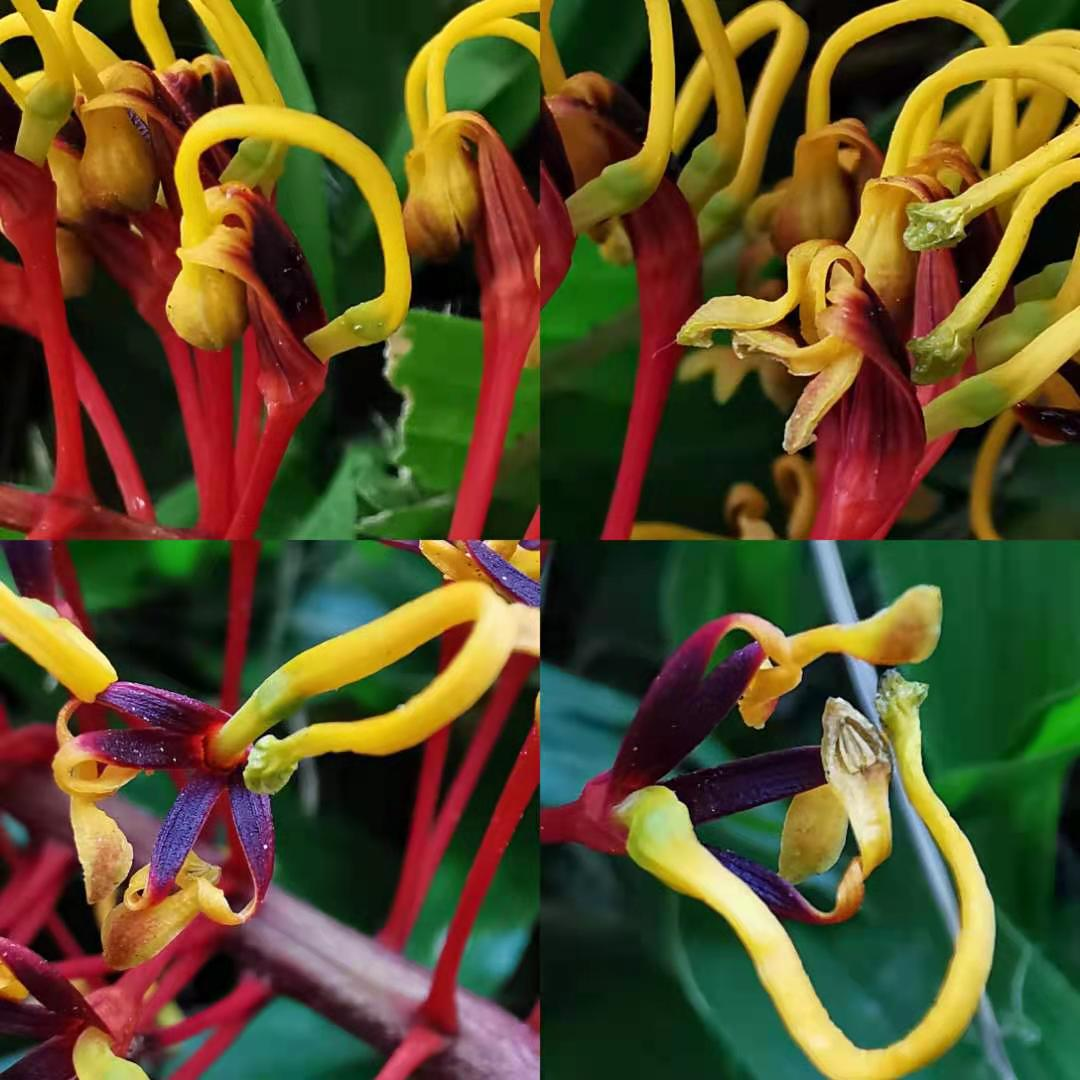
Stamen and pistil

Grevillea robusta, commonly known as the southern silky oak, silk oak or silky oak, silver oak or Australian silver oak, is a species of flowering plant in the family Proteaceae and is endemic to eastern Australia. It is a tree with deeply dissected, divided leaves, golden yellow to orange flowers with red blotches and flattened, elliptic to oval fruit.

== Description ==
Grevillea robusta is a fast-growing tree that typically grows to a height of 8–40 m (26–131 ft) with a single stem and dark grey, furrowed bark. Its leaves are 10–34 cm (3.9–13.4 in) long and 90–150 mm (3.5–5.9 in) wide and deeply dissected with 11 to 24 primary lobes, sometimes with up to five further divisions, the end lobes oblong to elliptic or almost triangular, 5–50 mm (0.20–1.97 in) long and 2–10 mm (0.079–0.394 in) wide. Many of the leaves are lost before flowering.

The flowers are arranged in one-sided, toothbrush-like groups, sometimes branched, 12–16 cm (4.7–6.3 in) long, each flower on a pedicel 7.5–16 mm (0.30–0.63 in) long. The carpel (the female part) of each flower has a stalk 21–28 mm (0.83–1.10 in) long. The flowers are glabrous and mostly yellowish orange, with reddish blotches. Flowering occurs from September to November and the fruit that follows is a glabrous follicle.

== Taxonomy and naming ==
Grevillea robusta was first formally described in 1830 by Robert Brown after an unpublished description by Allan Cunningham. The type specimen was collected by Cunningham on the eastern edge of Moreton Bay in 1827. Brown's description was published in Supplementum primum Prodromi florae Novae Hollandiae. The specific epithet (robusta) is a Latin word meaning "strong like oak" or "robust".

== Distribution and habitat ==
Silky oak occurs naturally on the coast and ranges in southern Queensland and in New South Wales as far south as Coffs Harbour where it grows in subtropical rainforest, dry rainforest and wet forests. It is now relatively rare in its natural habitat but has been widely planted. It has become naturalised in many places, including on Norfolk Island, Lord Howe Island and the Atherton Tableland in Australia, and overseas in South Africa, New Zealand, Hawaii, French Polynesia, Jamaica and Florida. It is regarded as a weed in parts of New South Wales and Victoria, and as invasive in Hawaii and South Africa.

== Uses ==
Before the advent of aluminium, Grevillea robusta timber was widely used for external window joinery, as it is resistant to wood rot. It has been used in the manufacture of furniture, cabinetry, and fences. Owing to declining G. robusta populations, felling has been restricted.

The flowers of Grevillea robusta produce a rich nectar, which Indigenous Australians traditionally consumed either directly from the blossom or by shaking the nectar into water.

== Cultivation ==
When young, it can be grown as a houseplant where it can tolerate light shade, but it prefers full sun because it grows best in warm zones. If planted outside, young trees need protection on frosty nights. Once established, it is hardier and tolerates temperatures down to −8 °C (18 °F). It needs occasional water but is otherwise fairly drought-resistant. Care needs to be taken when planting it near bushland because it can be invasive.

G. robusta is often used as stock for grafting difficult-to-grow grevilleas. It has been planted widely throughout the city of Kunming in south-western China, forming shady avenues.

G. robusta is grown in plantations in South Africa, and can also be grown alongside maize in agroforestry systems.

In the UK, G. robusta has gained the Royal Horticultural Society's Award of Garden Merit.

== Toxicity and allergic reactions ==
The flowers and fruit contain toxic hydrogen cyanide. Tridecylresorcinol in G. robusta is responsible for contact dermatitis.

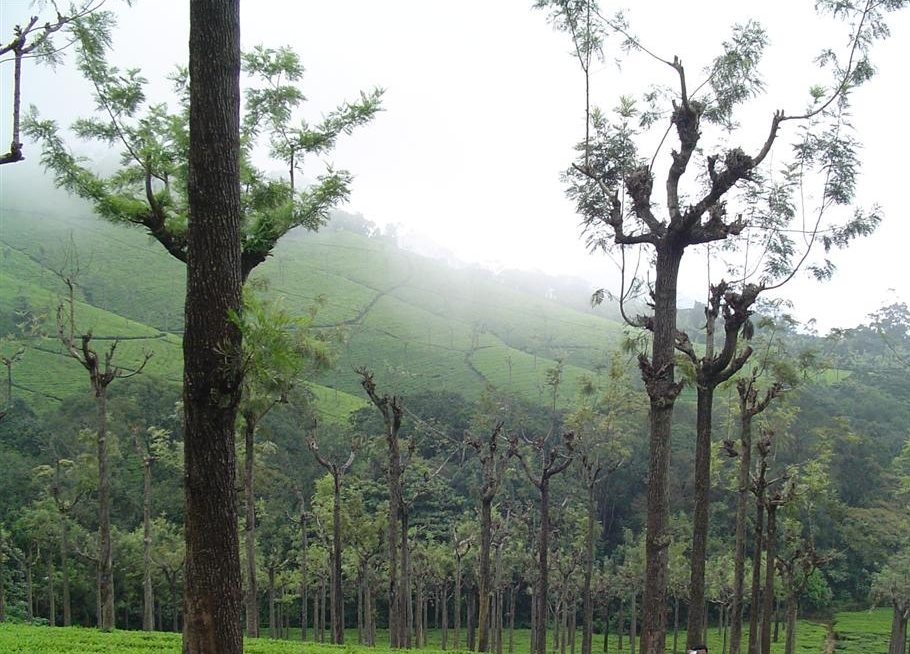
Silky oaks planted in a tea plantation

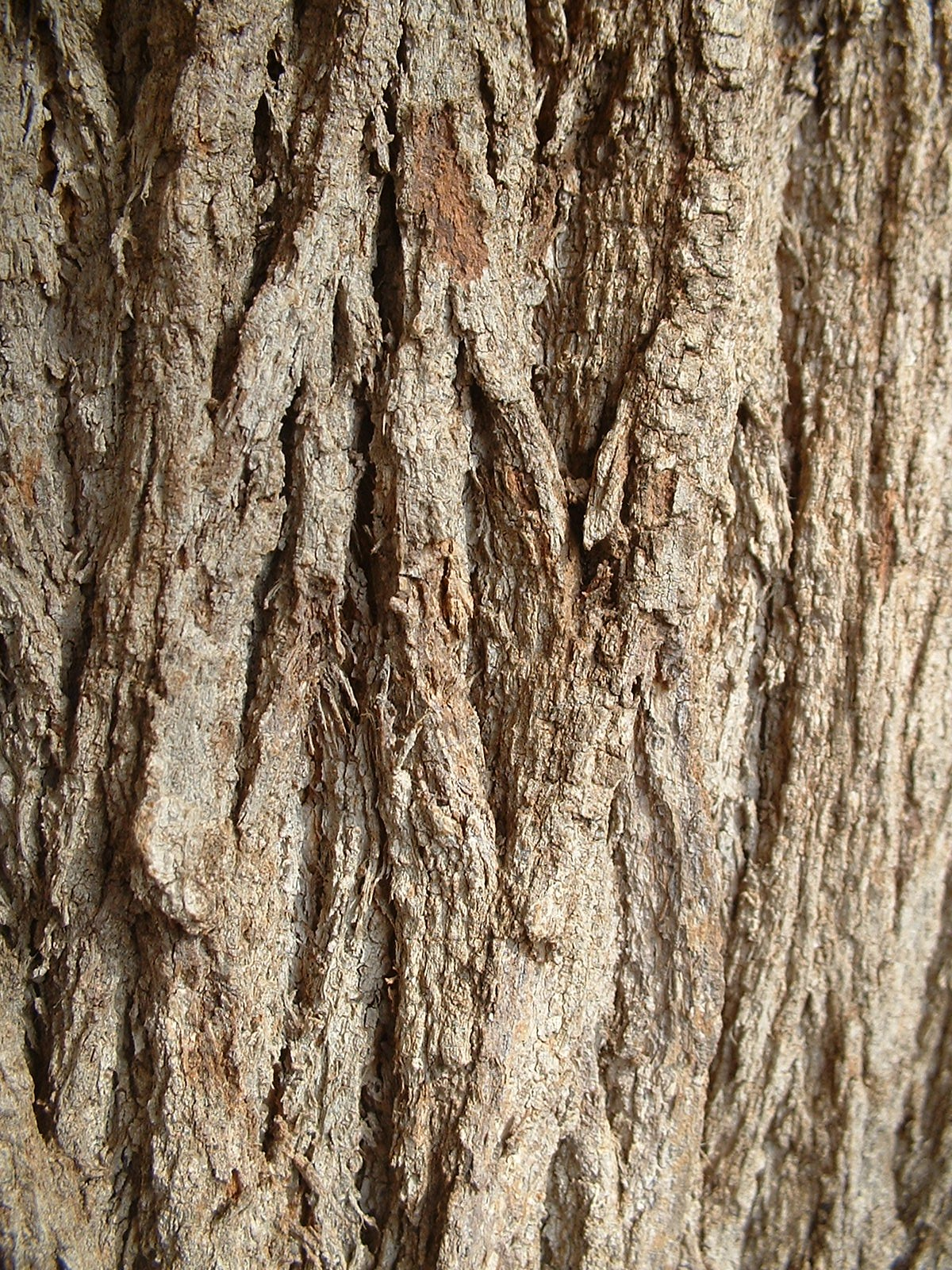
Trunk bark

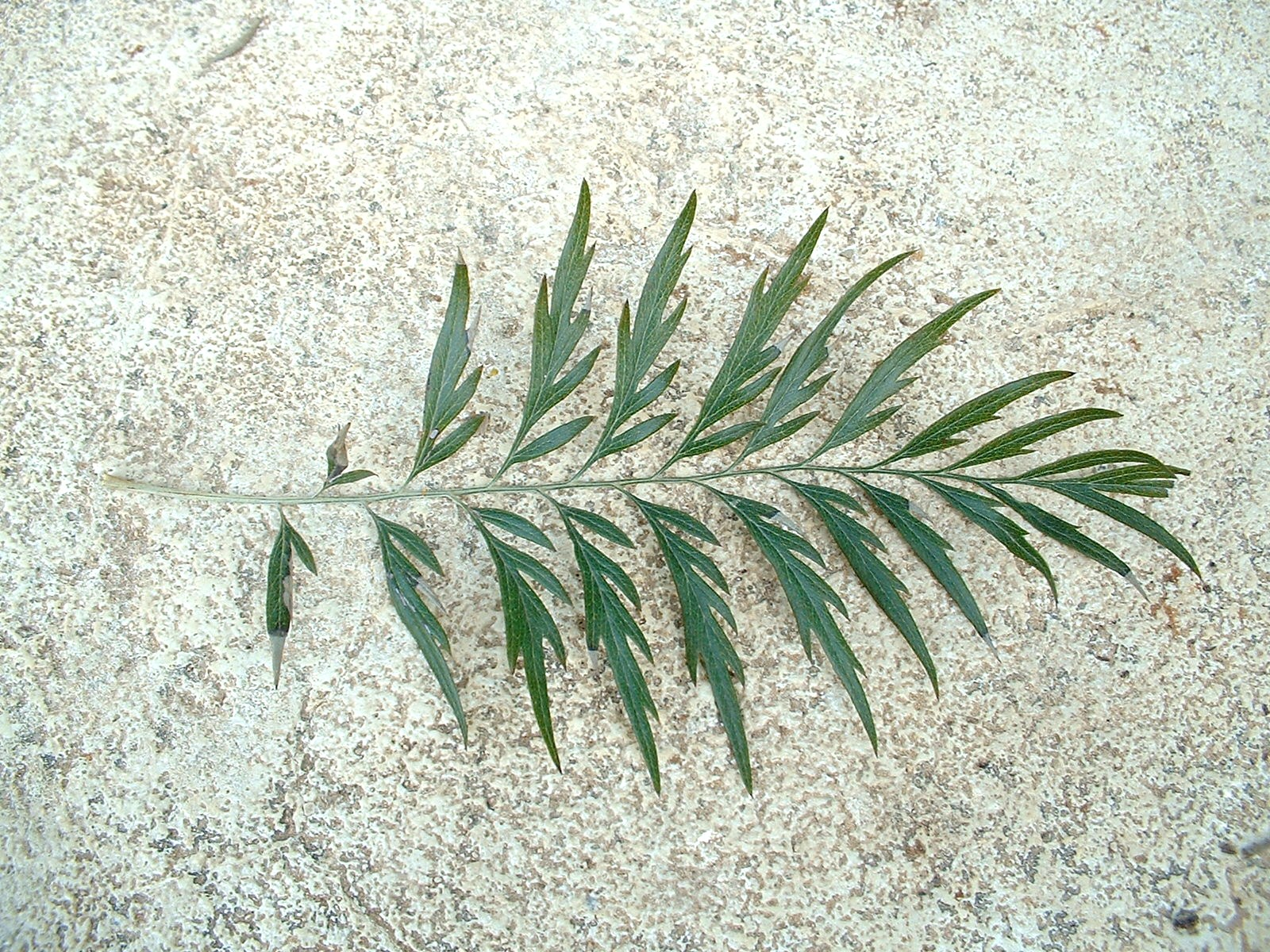
Leaf

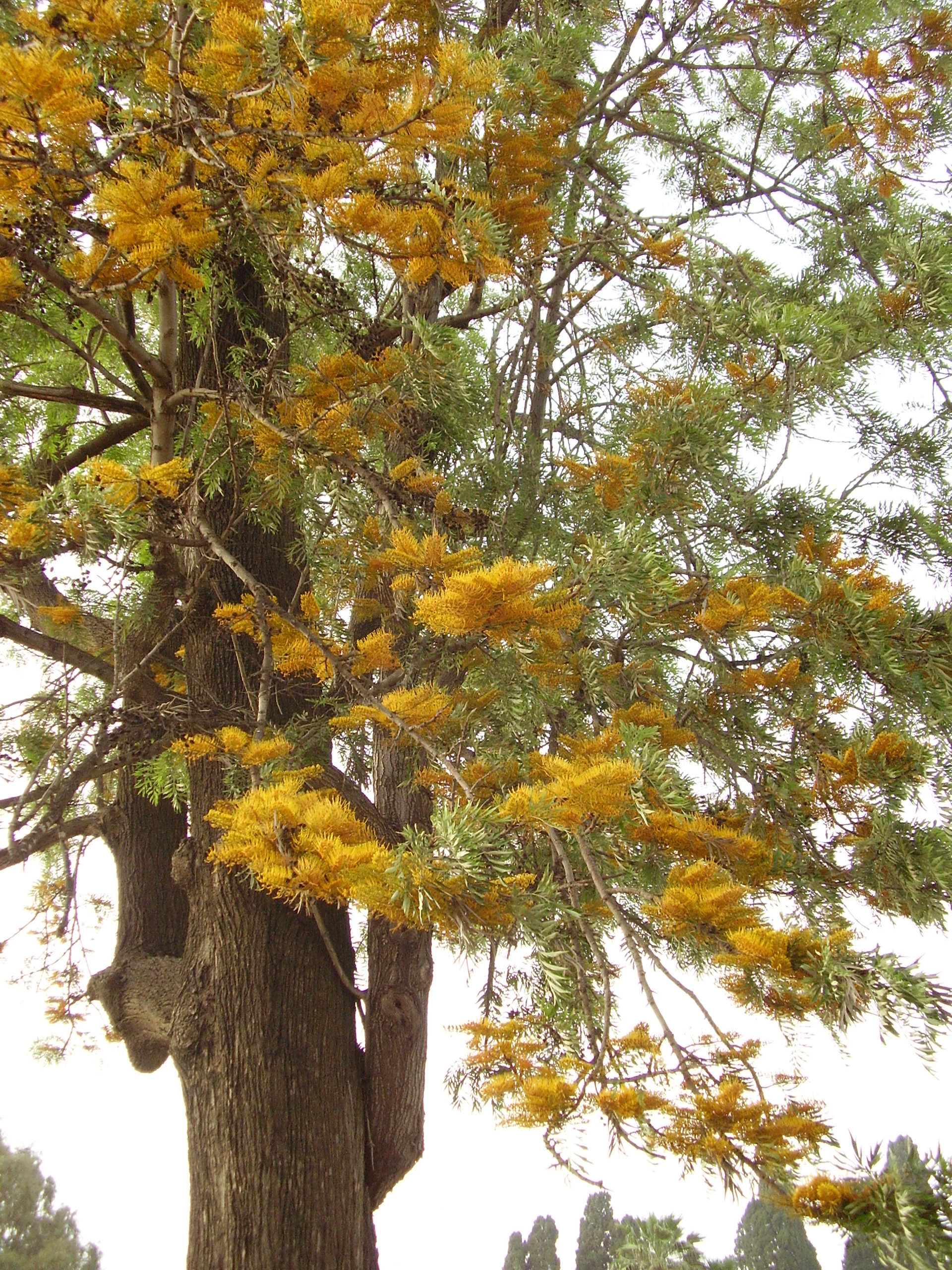
Flowering branches

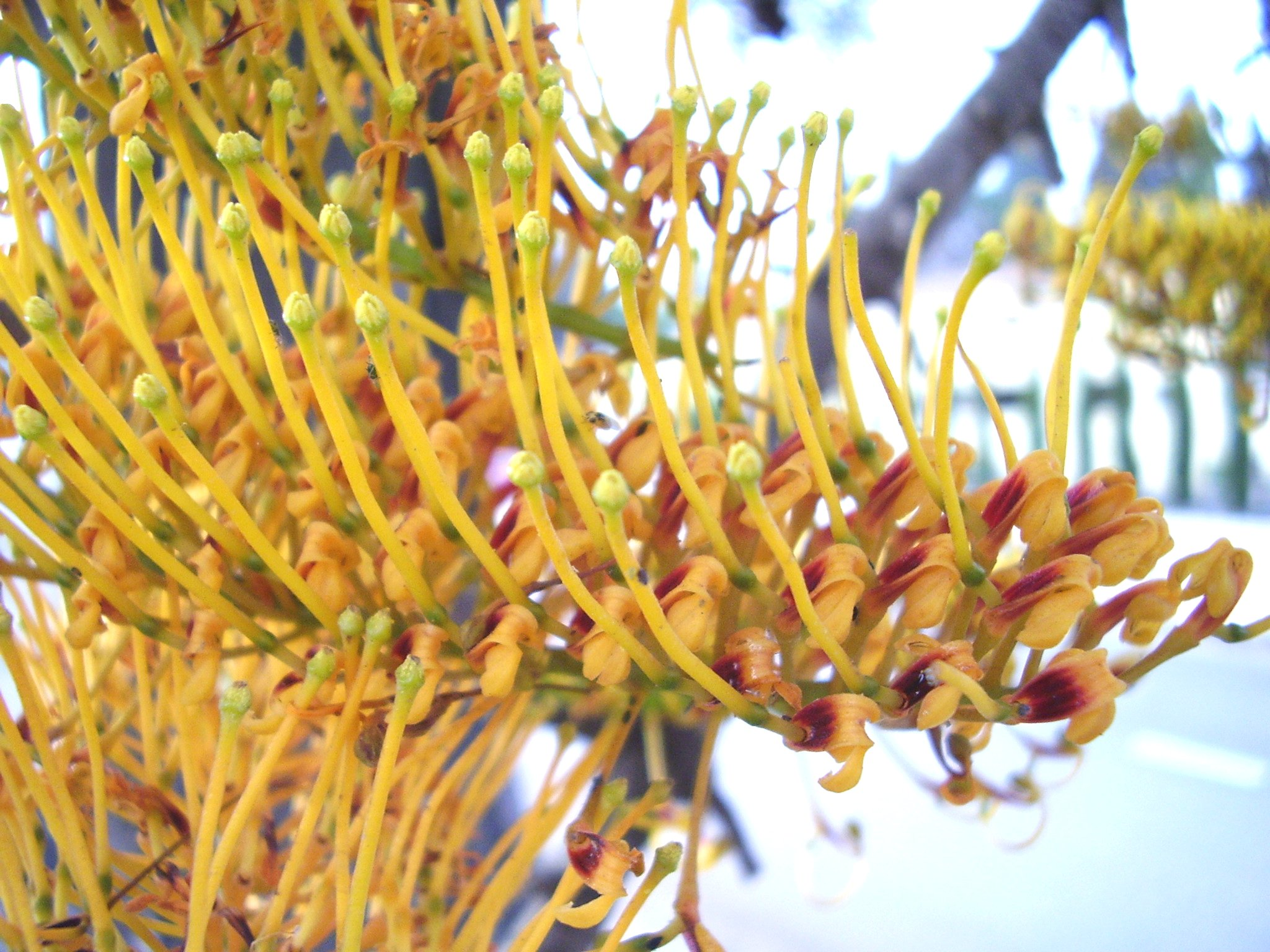
Flowers

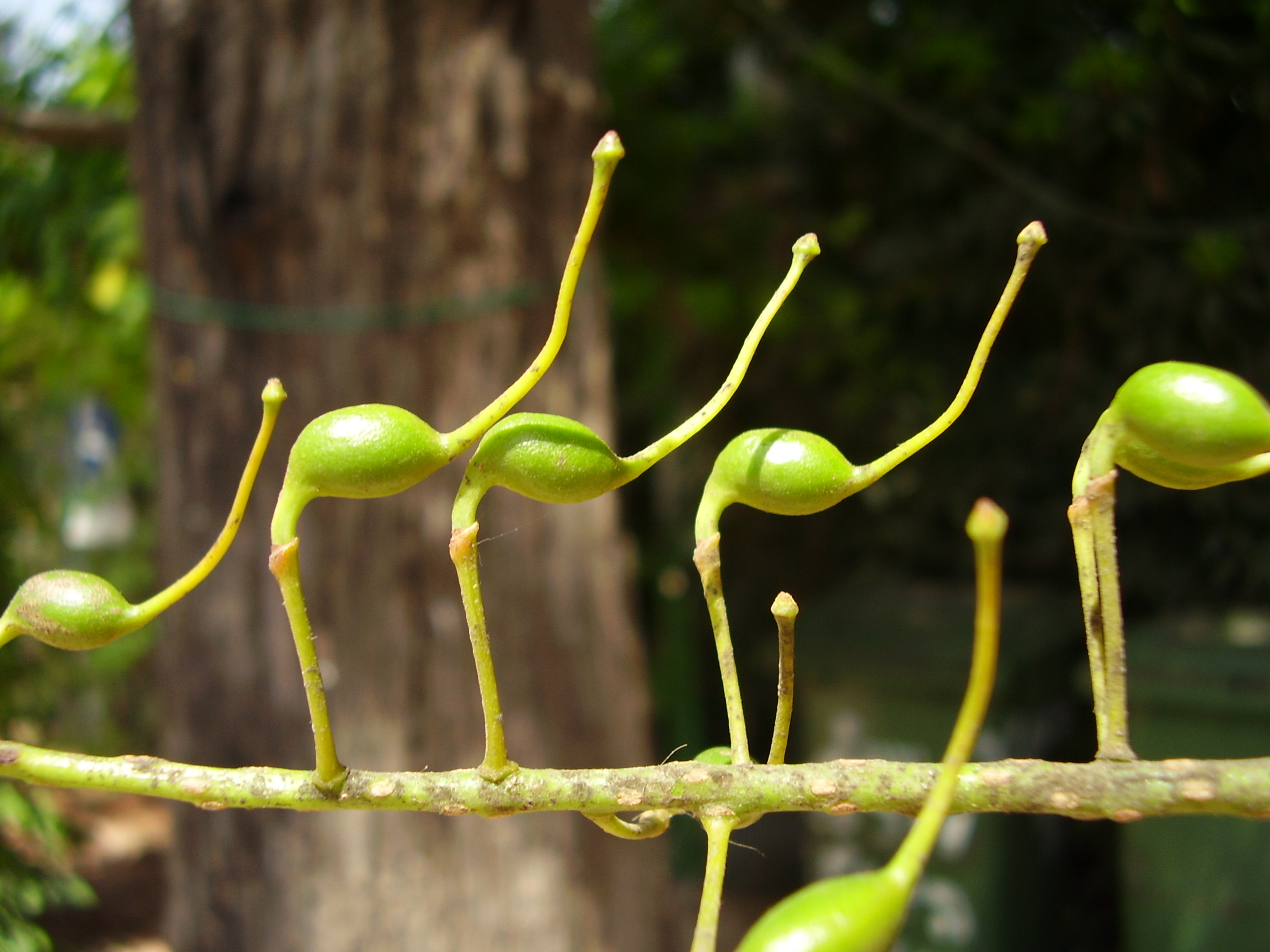
Unripe seed pods

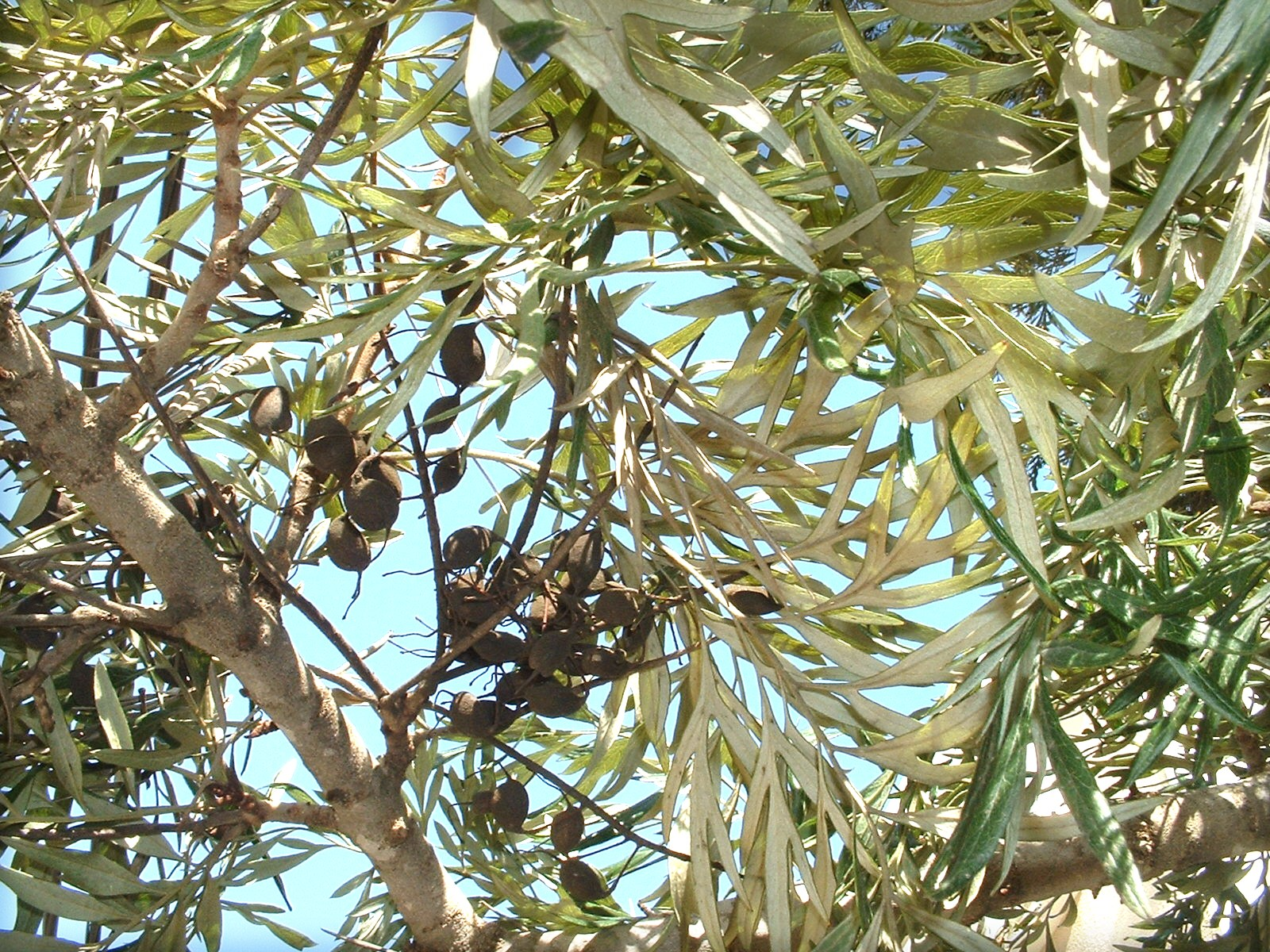
Leaves and dry seed pods

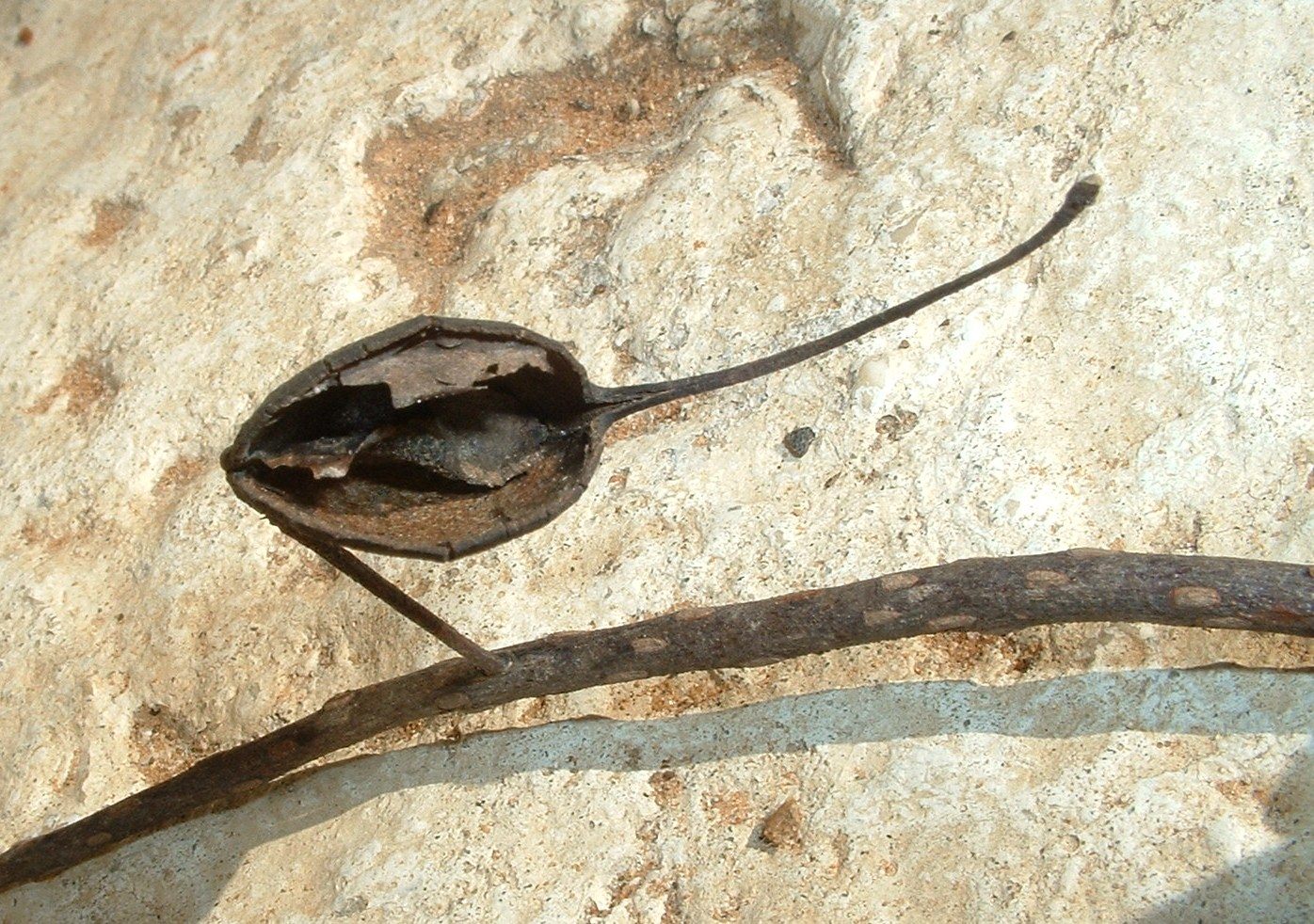
Dry seed pod

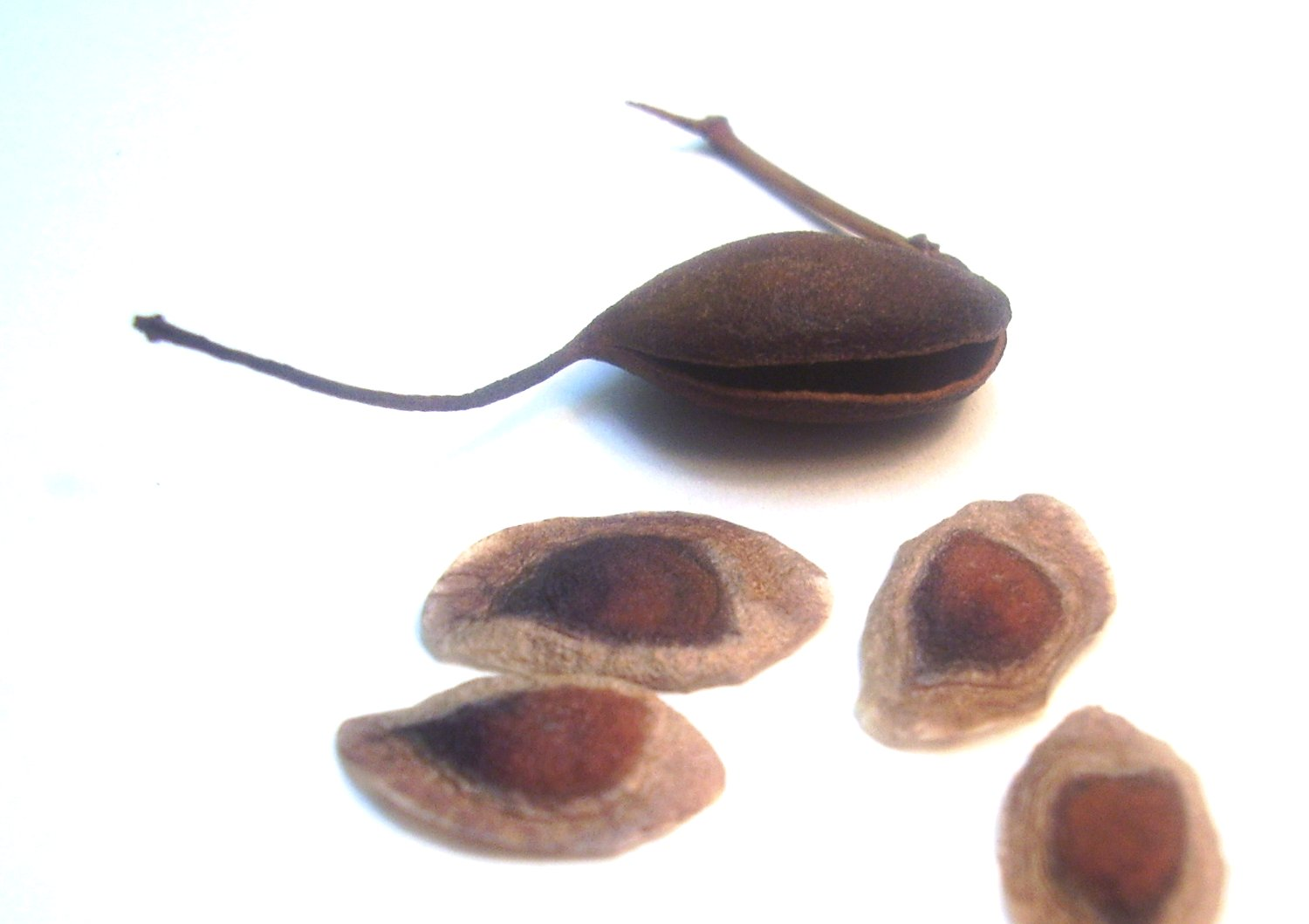
Seed pod and seeds

Flowering branches

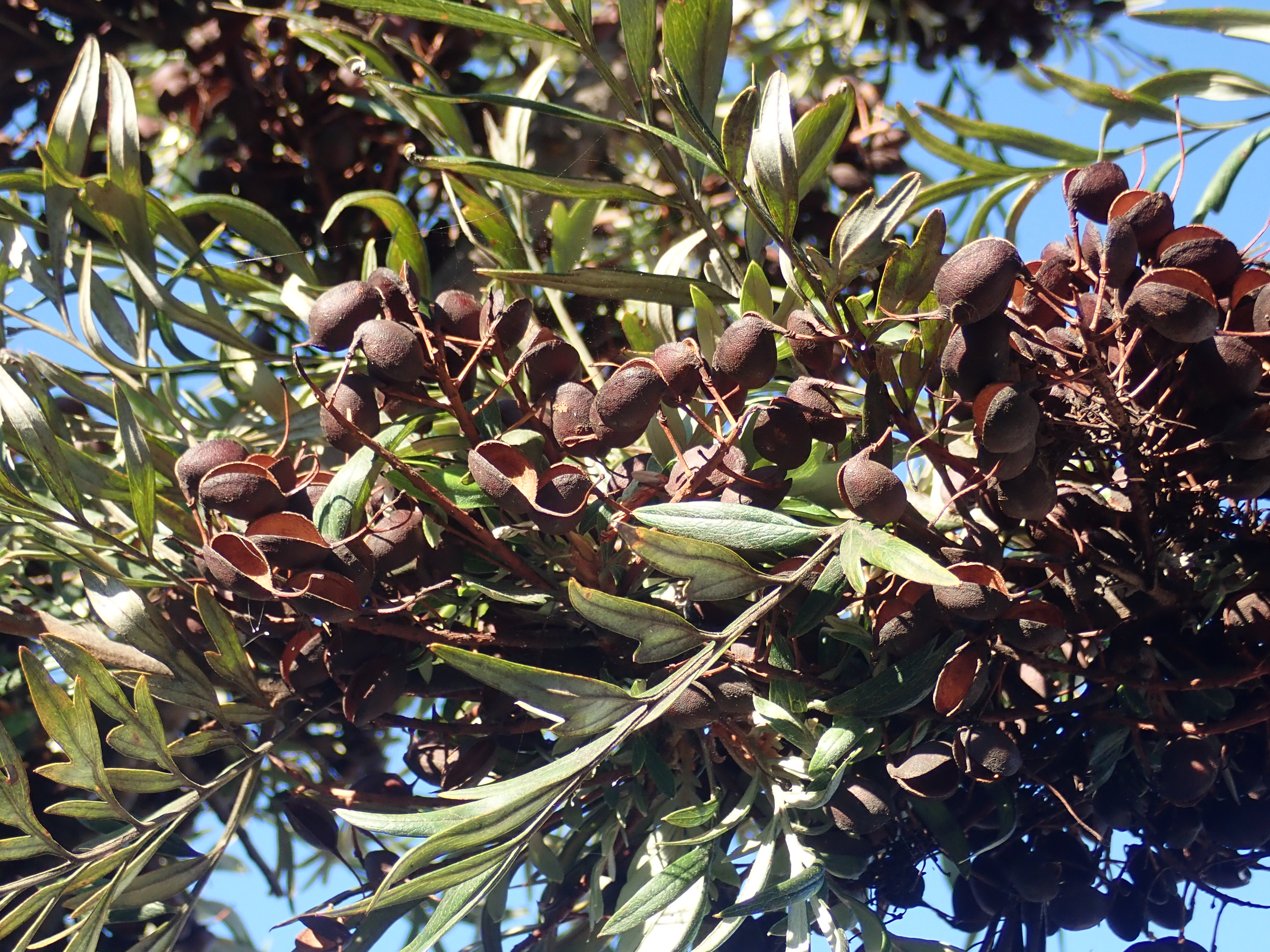
Seed pods

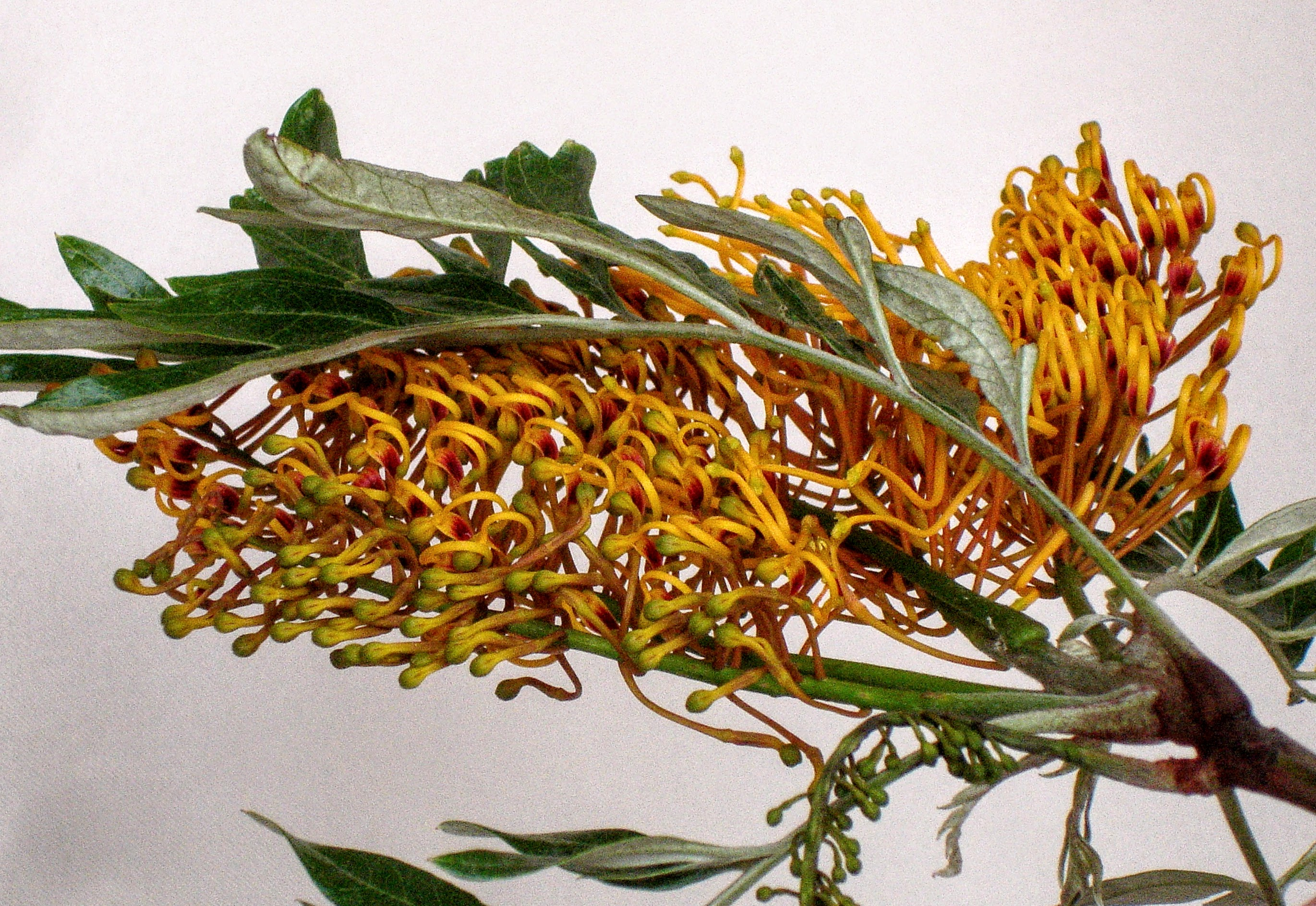
Branch end with inflorescence

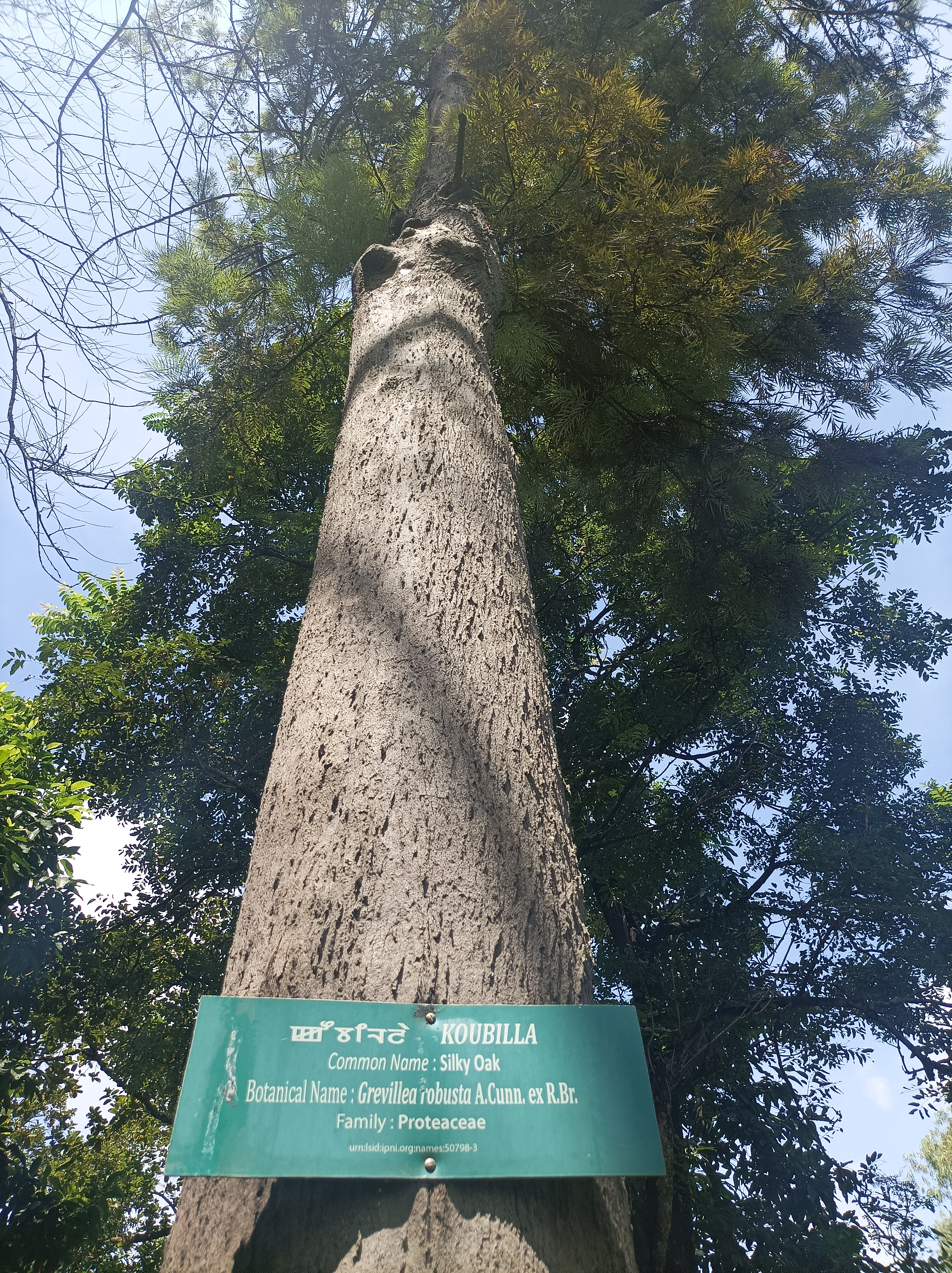
Tree in Kangla Fort

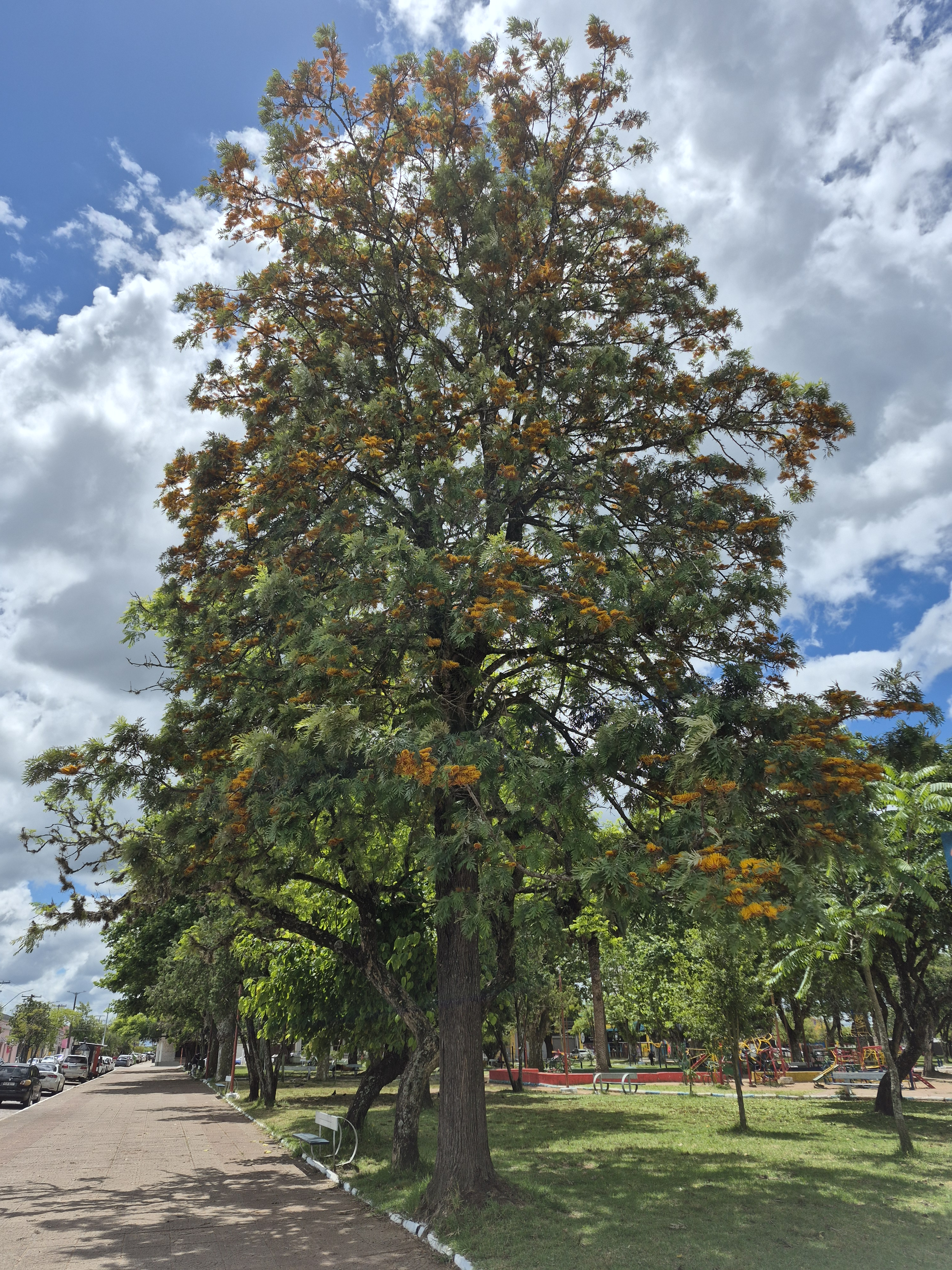
In flower in Brazil
