= Mayariochloa =

Scientific classification
- Kingdom: Plantae
- Clade: Tracheophytes
- Clade: Angiosperms
- Clade: Monocots
- Clade: Commelinids
- Order: Poales
- Family: Poaceae
- Subfamily: Panicoideae
- Supertribe: Panicodae
- Tribe: Paniceae
- Subtribe: Boivinellinae
- Genus: Mayariochloa; Salariato, Morrone & Zuloaga
- Species: M. amphistemon

Binomial name
- Mayariochloa amphistemon (C.Wright) Salariato, Morrone & Zuloaga

Synonyms
- Panicum amphistemon C.Wright; Alloteropsis amphistemon (C.Wright) Hitchc.; Scutachne amphistemon (C.Wright) Hitchc. & Chase

Genus of grasses

Mayariochloa is a genus of Cuban plants in the grass family. The only known species is Mayariochloa amphistemon, native to central and eastern Cuba.

The leaves are mostly basal.
