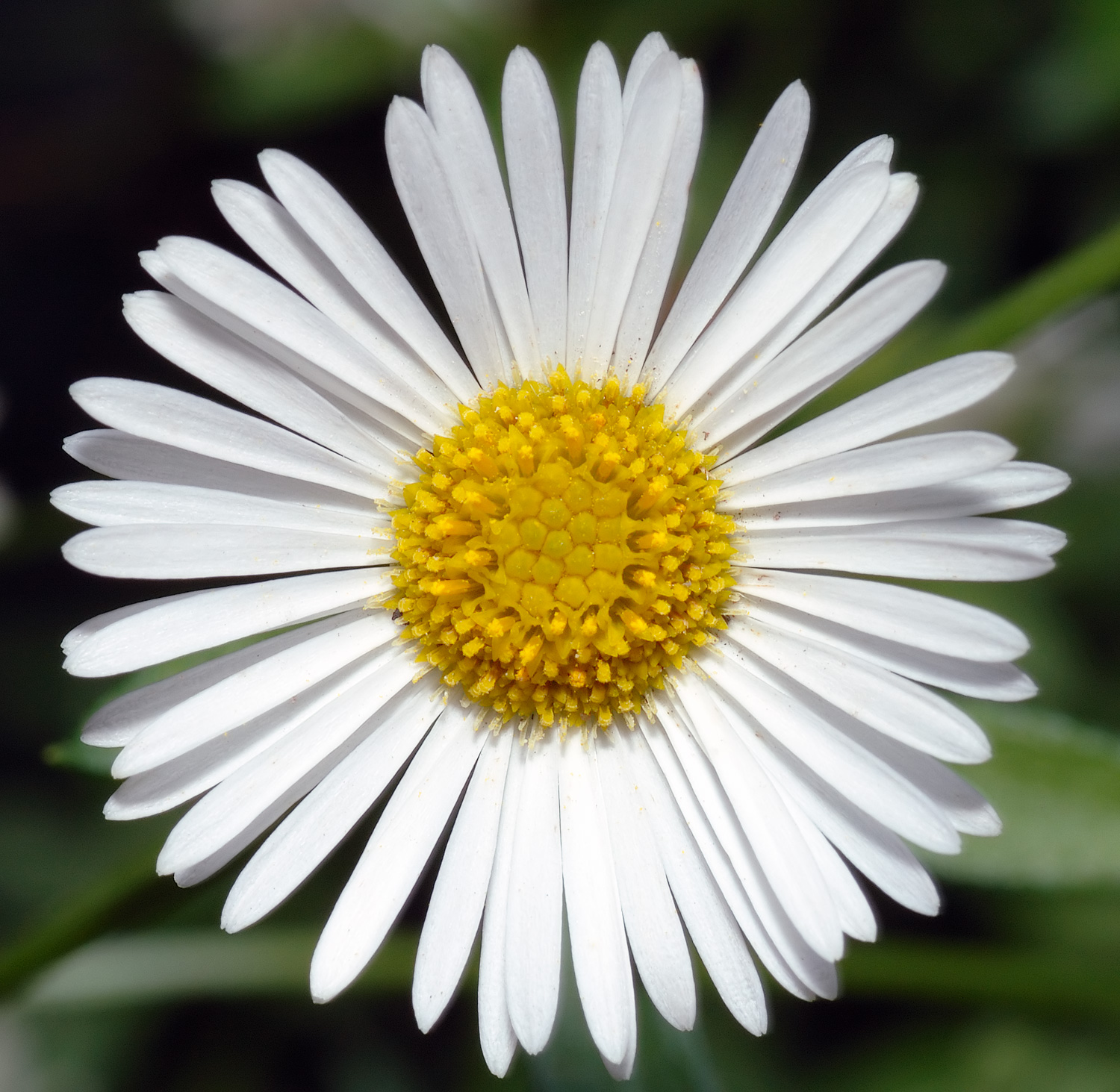

Scientific classification
- Kingdom: Plantae
- Clade: Embryophytes
- Clade: Tracheophytes
- Clade: Angiosperms
- Clade: Eudicots
- Clade: Asterids
- Order: Asterales
- Family: Asteraceae
- Genus: Erigeron
- Species: E. karvinskianus

Binomial name
- Erigeron karvinskianus DC.

Synonyms
- Synonymy: Aster erigeroides (DC.) Harv. 1865 not Hook. & Arn. 1836; Erigeron mucronatus DC.; Erigeron trilobus Sond.; Felicia erigeroides DC.; Felicia natalensis Sch.Bip. ex Walp.; Felicia trinervia Turcz.; Erigeron karvinskianum DC.

= Erigeron karvinskianus =

Species of flowering plant in the daisy family

Erigeron karvinskianus, the Mexican fleabane, is a species of daisy-like flowering plant in the family Asteraceae, native to Mexico and parts of Central America.

Other common names include Latin American fleabane, Santa Barbara daisy, Spanish daisy, Karwinsky's fleabane, or bony-tip fleabane.

== Description ==
It is a vigorous, spreading perennial plant growing from woody rhizomes to a maximum height of 15 cm (5.9 in). Its leaves are located along the stem, the basal leaves dying off as the plant bolts. They are sometimes slightly toothed or lobed near the tips. The inflorescences hold one or more flower heads which are each about 1 cm (0.4 inches) wide. They have golden yellow disc florets in the center surrounded by a fringe of up to 80 white to pinkish ray florets.

== Flowering ==
In the UK, it flowers from May to October.

== Distribution ==
Erigeron karvinskianus is native to much of Mexico, Central America, Colombia and Venezuela. and is naturalized in many other places, including parts of Africa and Europe, Australia, Hong Kong, Chile, the west coast of the United States, and New Zealand, where it is a weed species that impacts native forest restoration.

== Taxonomy ==
The plant was first described in 1836 by Augustin Pyramus de Candolle. The specific epithet refers to Wilhelm Friedrich Karwinski von Karwin, who collected the plant in Mexico according to de Candolle.

== Cultivation ==
Erigeron karvinskianus is also cultivated for its daisy-like blooms, and is often confused with the closely related true daisy Bellis perennis. It is frequently grown in crevices in walls or paving, where it rapidly spreads to provide a carpet of flowers. It has gained the Royal Horticultural Society's Award of Garden Merit. It was used to colonise the concrete terraces of the football stadium (Estadio Azteca) built in Mexico City for the 1970 World Cup.

== Gallery ==
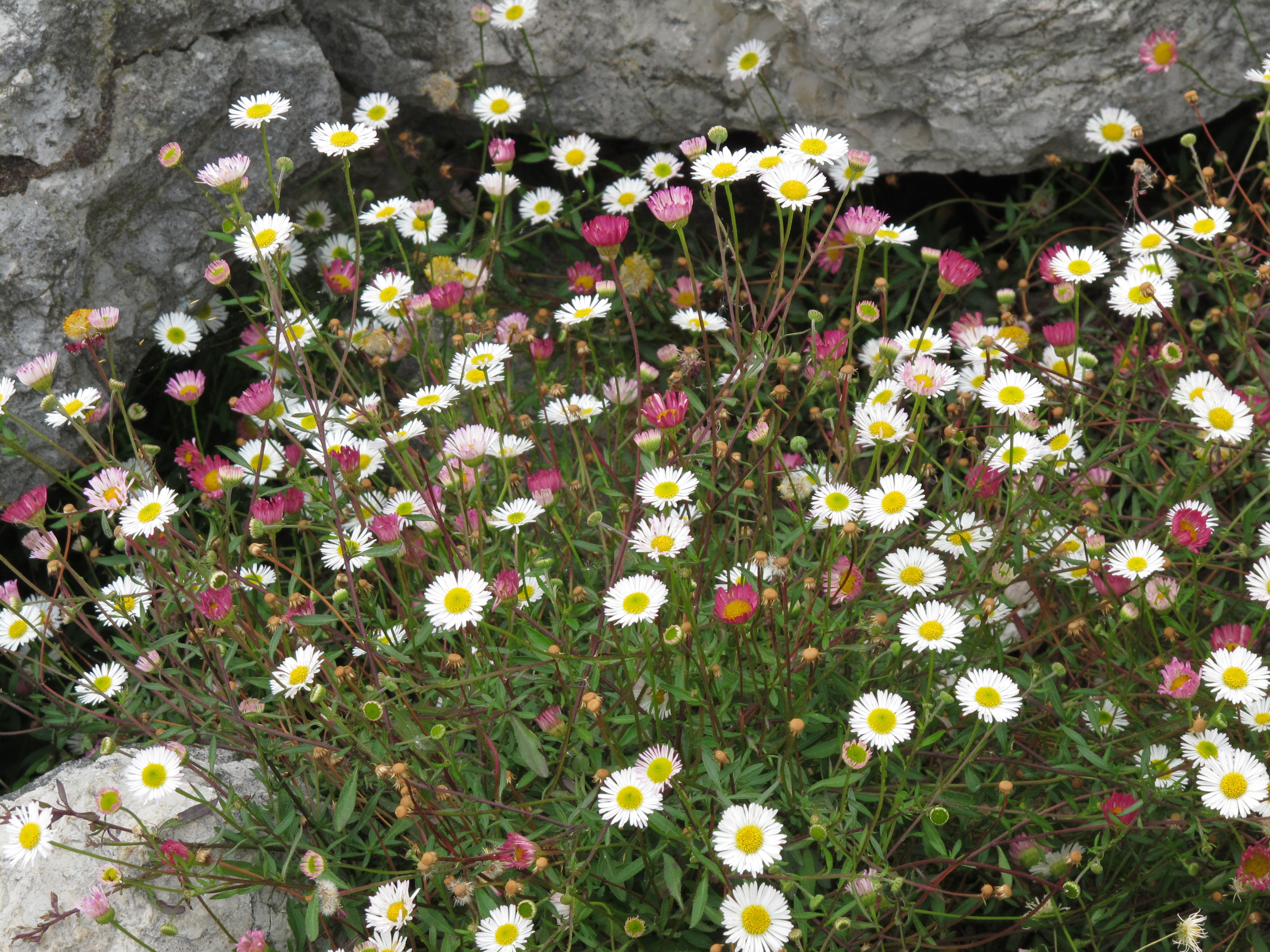
Habit

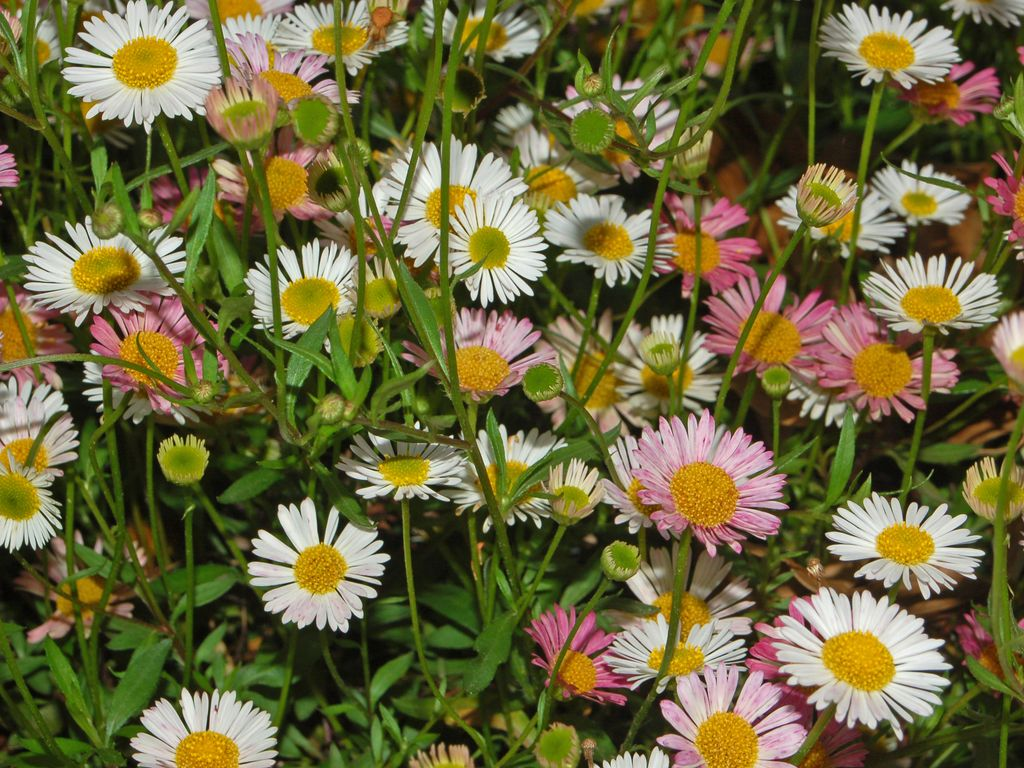
Flowers

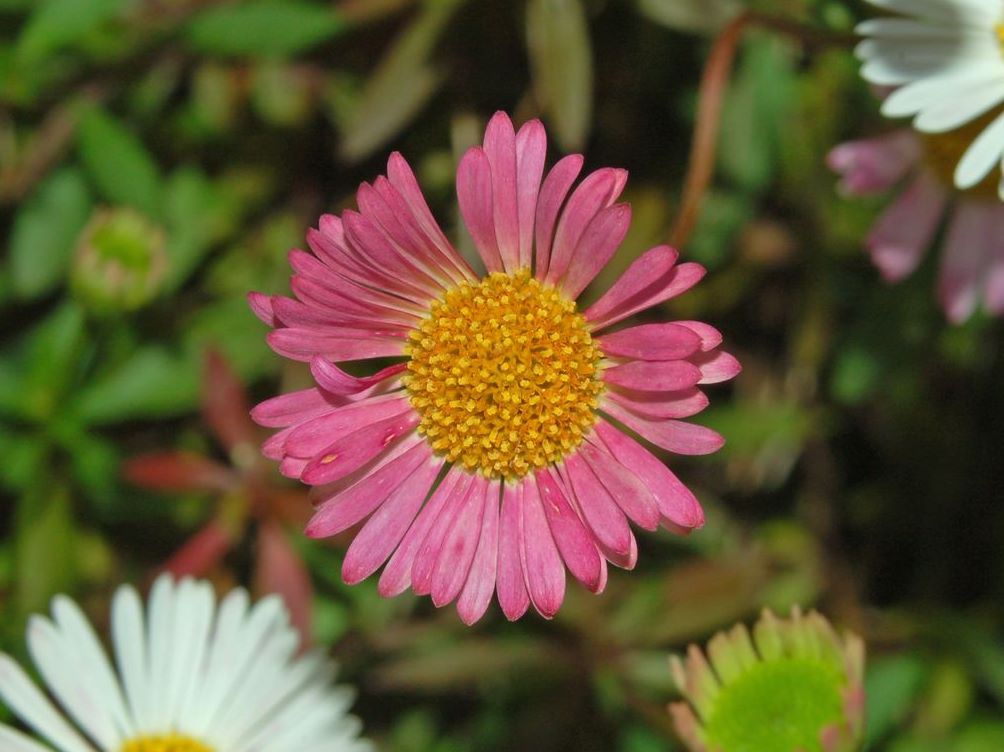
Flower

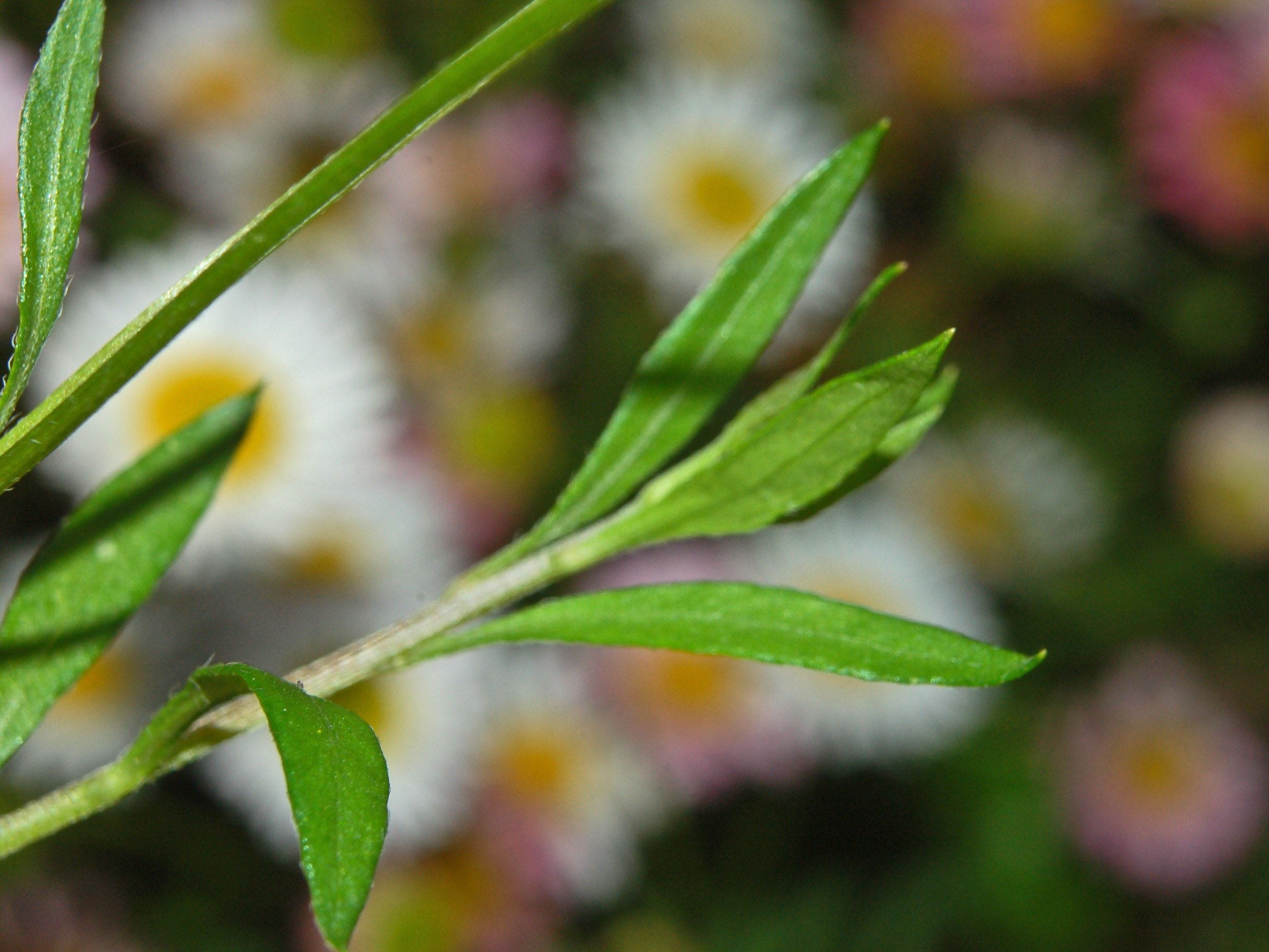
Leaves
