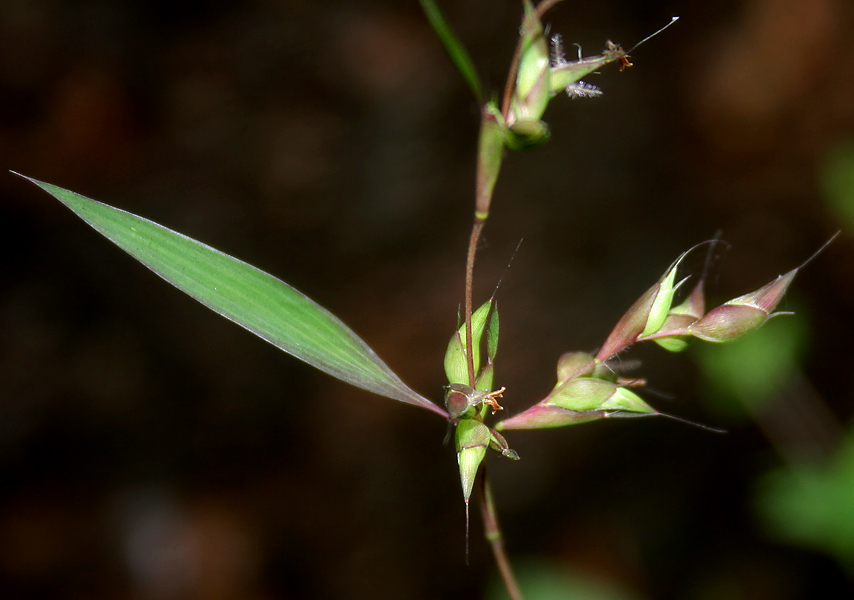

Scientific classification
- Kingdom: Plantae
- Clade: Tracheophytes
- Clade: Angiosperms
- Clade: Monocots
- Clade: Commelinids
- Order: Poales
- Family: Poaceae
- Subfamily: Panicoideae
- Supertribe: Andropogonodae
- Tribe: Andropogoneae
- Genus: Apluda; L.
- Species: A. mutica

Binomial name
- Apluda mutica L.

Synonyms
- Calamina P.Beauv.; Calamina mutica (L.) P.Beauv.; Apluda varia Hack.; Apluda aristata L.; Andropogon glaucus Retz.; Apluda glauca (Retz.) Schreb.; Apluda villosa Schreb.; Calamina gigantea P.Beauv.; Apluda geniculata Roxb.; Apluda gigantea (P.Beauv.) Spreng.; Tripsacum giganteum (P.Beauv.) Raspail; Calamina humilis J.Presl; Apluda humilis (J.Presl) Kunth; Andropogon involucratus J.Koenig ex Steud.; Apluda communis Arn. & Nees; Apluda kobila Buch.-Ham. ex Nees; Apluda microstachya Nees; Apluda rostrata Arn. & Nees; Xerochloa latifolia Hassk.; Apluda mucronata Steud.; Apluda ciliata Andersson; Apluda scabra Andersson; Apluda cumingii Buse; Apluda pedicellata Buse; Apluda inermis Regel

= Apluda =

Genus of grasses

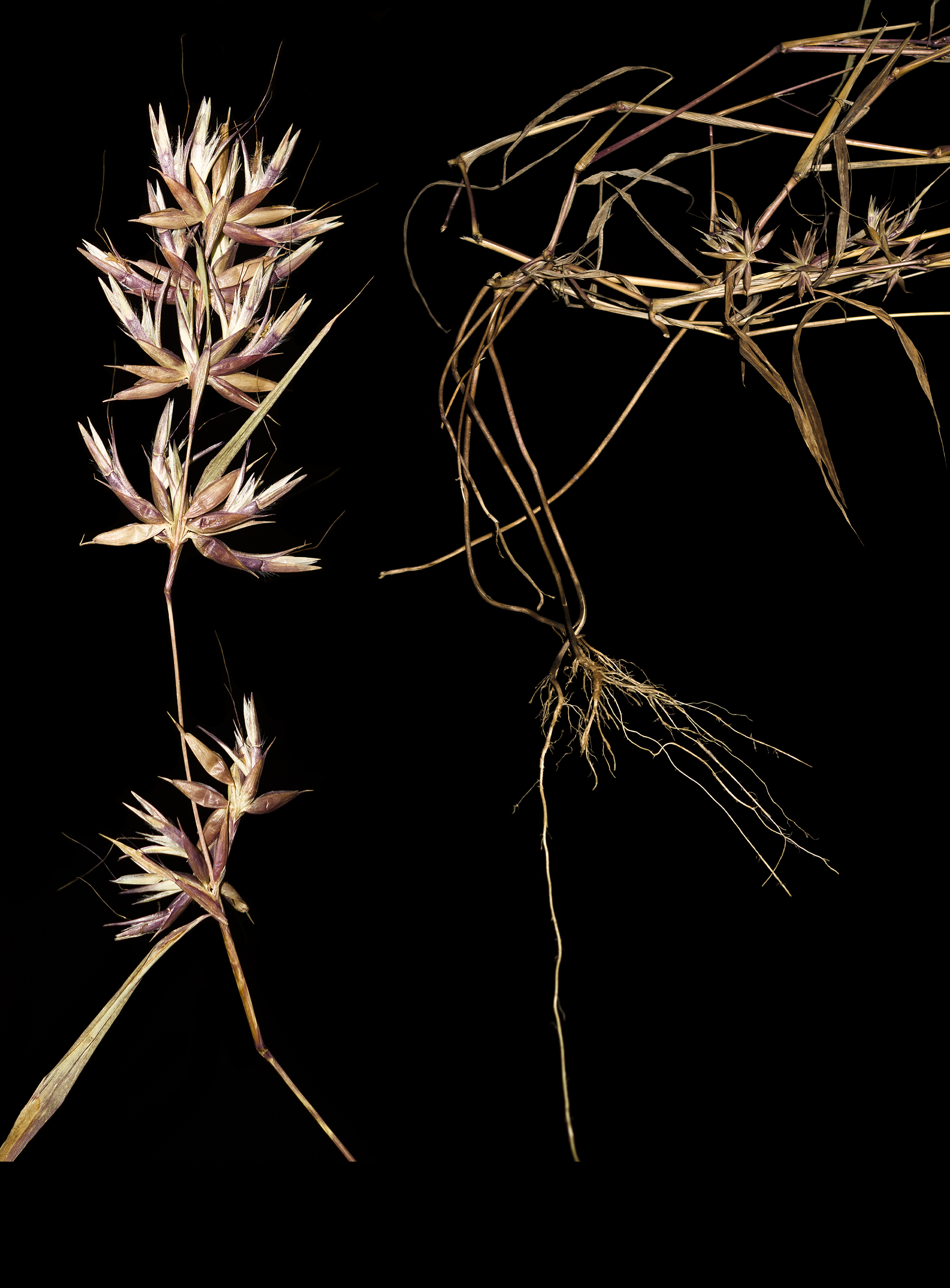
Apluda mutica L.

Apluda is a genus of plants in the grass family native to Asia and to various islands in the Indian and Pacific Oceans.

The only known species is Apluda mutica, native to Central Asia, China (incl. Taiwan + Tibet), Japan (incl Ryukyu Islands), Indian subcontinent, Southeast Asia, New Guinea, Vanuatu, Solomon Islands, New Caledonia, Caroline Islands, Madagascar, Mauritius, Réunion, Socotra, Oman.

Formerly included

see Andropogon, Ichnanthus, Ischaemum, Polytoca, Themeda, Zeugites

- Apluda digitata – Polytoca digitata
- Apluda distachya – Andropogon distachyos
- Apluda imberbis – Themeda triandra
- Apluda rugosa – Ischaemum rugosum
- Apluda zeugites – Zeugites americanus
- Apluda zeygites – Ichnanthus pallens

== See also ==
- List of Poaceae genera
