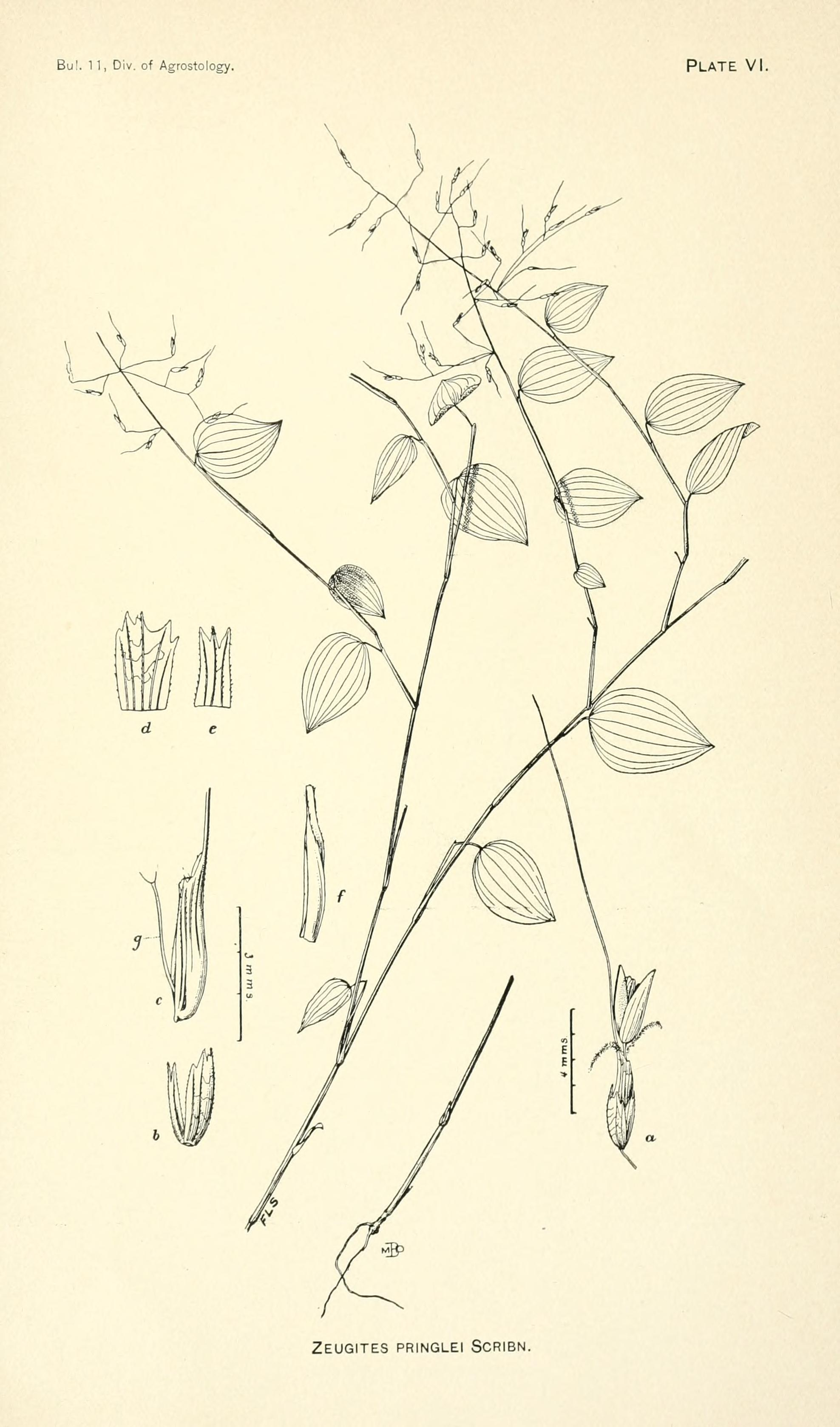
- Zeugites americanus (as Z. pringlei)

Scientific classification
- Kingdom: Plantae
- Clade: Embryophytes
- Clade: Tracheophytes
- Clade: Spermatophytes
- Clade: Angiosperms
- Clade: Monocots
- Clade: Commelinids
- Order: Poales
- Family: Poaceae
- Clade: PACMAD clade
- Subfamily: Panicoideae
- Tribe: Zeugiteae; Sánchez-Ken & L.G. Clark (2010)

Genera
- Four genera, see text

Synonyms
- Zeugitinae Caro (1982)

= Zeugiteae =

Tribe of grasses

Zeugiteae is a tribe of the subfamily Panicoideae in the grasses (Poaceae), native to Africa, Asia, Australasia, South and Central America. There are 18 species in four genera.

Zeugiteae is sister to the tribe Chasmanthieae. These two tribes, together with the Cyperochloeae, Thysanolaeneae, Centotheceae, Steyermarkochloeae, and Tristachyideae form a monophyletic clade that is sister to the rest of the Panicoideae.

Species in this tribe use the C_{3} photosynthetic pathway.

== Genera ==
- Chevalierella
- Lophatherum
- Orthoclada
- Zeugites (syn. Calderonella, Pohlidium)
