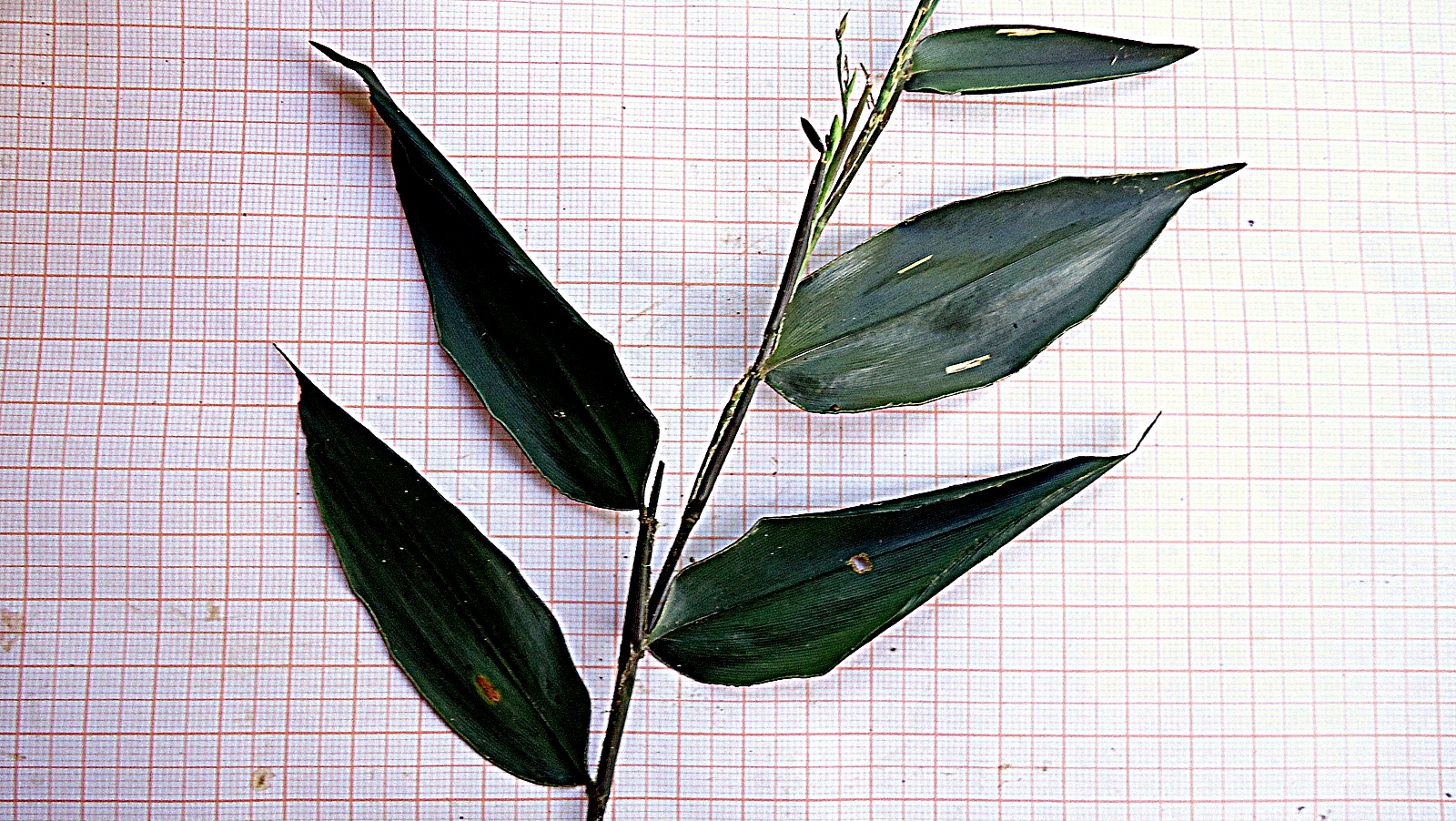
- Ichnanthus nemoralis

Scientific classification
- Kingdom: Plantae
- Clade: Embryophytes
- Clade: Tracheophytes
- Clade: Spermatophytes
- Clade: Angiosperms
- Clade: Monocots
- Clade: Commelinids
- Order: Poales
- Family: Poaceae
- Subfamily: Panicoideae
- Supertribe: Andropogonodae
- Tribe: Paspaleae
- Subtribe: Paspalinae
- Genus: Ichnanthus; P.Beauv.

Type species
- Ichnanthus panicoides P.Beauv.

Synonyms
- Navicularia Raddi 1823, illegitimate homonym not Heist. ex Fabr. 1759 (Lamiaceae); Panicum sect. Ichnanthus (P.Beauv.) Trin.

= Ichnanthus =

Bedgrass

Genus of grasses

Ichnanthus, commonly called bedgrass, is a genus of tropical plants in the grass family, widespread in Africa, Asia, Australia, and the Americas.

Species

- Ichnanthus annuus - Colombia, Venezuela
- Ichnanthus bambusiflorus - Brazil
- Ichnanthus breviscrobs - trop South America
- Ichnanthus calvescens - Mexico, Central + South America, Trinidad
- Ichnanthus camporum - Brazil
- Ichnanthus dasycoleus - Central + South America
- Ichnanthus ephemeroblepharis - Amazon of Brazil + Venezuela
- Ichnanthus glaber - eastern Brazil
- Ichnanthus grandifolius - Brazil
- Ichnanthus hirtus - Colombia, Peru, Brazil
- Ichnanthus hoffmannseggii - French Guiana, Brazil
- Ichnanthus inconstans - from Oaxaca to Paraguay
- Ichnanthus lanceolatus - southern Mexico, Central America
- Ichnanthus lancifolius - trop South America
- Ichnanthus leiocarpus - trop South America, Trinidad
- Ichnanthus leptophyllus - eastern Brazil
- Ichnanthus longhi-wagnerii - Bahia
- Ichnanthus longiglumis - southeastern Brazil
- Ichnanthus mayarensis - Cuba, northern Brazil
- Ichnanthus mollis - Brazil
- Ichnanthus nemoralis - Mexico, Central + South America, Trinidad
- Ichnanthus nemorosus - Mexico, Central + South America, West Indies
- Ichnanthus pallens - West Africa, Asia (from India to Ryukyu Is to Java), New Guinea, Queensland, Mexico, Central + South America, West Indies
- Ichnanthus panicoides - Mexico, Central + South America
- Ichnanthus procurrens - Brazil, Bolivia, Argentina, Paraguay
- Ichnanthus riedelii - Brazil + Venezuela
- Ichnanthus ruprechtii - trop South America
- Ichnanthus tarumanensis - Brazil
- Ichnanthus tectus - Venezuela
- Ichnanthus tenuis - Mexico, Central + South America, Trinidad
- Ichnanthus zehntneri - Brazil

formerly included

see Chevalierella Echinolaena Homolepis Ottochloa Panicum Parodiophyllochloa Yakirra

- Ichnanthus apiculatus - Parodiophyllochloa ovulifera
- Ichnanthus australiensis - Yakirra australiensis
- Ichnanthus dewildemanii - Chevalierella dewildemanii
- Ichnanthus foliolosus - Yakirra foliolosa
- Ichnanthus gardneri - Panicum chapadense
- Ichnanthus glaber Link ex Steud. 1854 not (Raddi) Hitchc. 1920 - Panicum virgatum
- Ichnanthus harmandii - Panicum trachyrhachis
- Ichnanthus lilloi - Echinolaena minarum
- Ichnanthus longiflorus - Homolepis longispicula
- Ichnanthus majusculus - Yakirra majuscula
- Ichnanthus minarum - Echinolaena minarum
- Ichnanthus mueensis - Panicum mueense
- Ichnanthus muelleri - Yakirra muelleri
- Ichnanthus oblongus - Ottochloa nodosa
- Ichnanthus oplismenoides - Echinolaena oplismenoides
- Ichnanthus pauciflorus - Yakirra pauciflora
- Ichnanthus riparius - Echinolaena minarum
- Ichnanthus sandiensis - Echinolaena minarum
- Ichnanthus standleyi - Echinolaena standleyi
- Ichnanthus trinii - Panicum trinii
