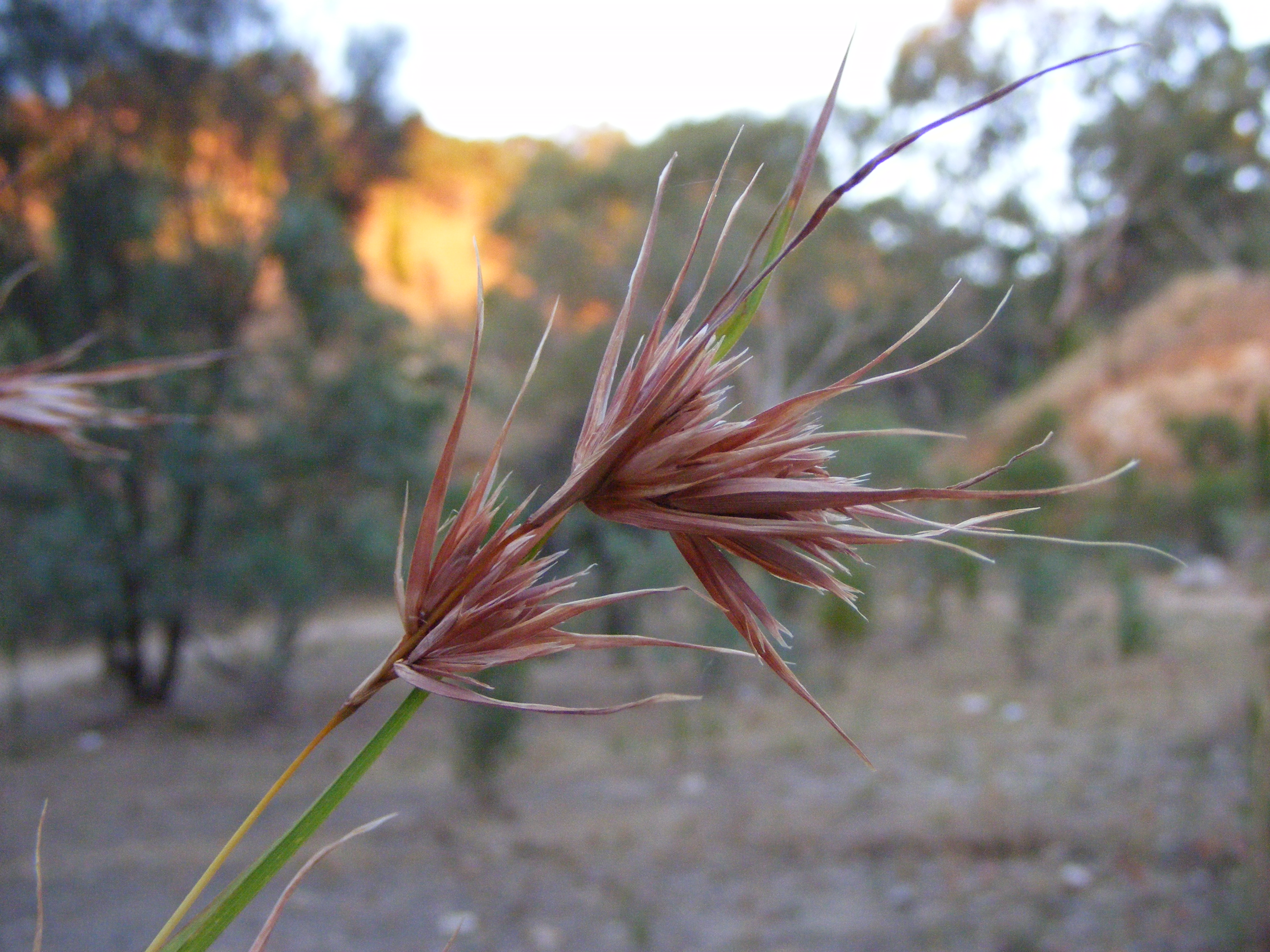
- Themeda triandra

Scientific classification
- Kingdom: Plantae
- Clade: Tracheophytes
- Clade: Angiosperms
- Clade: Monocots
- Clade: Commelinids
- Order: Poales
- Family: Poaceae
- Subfamily: Panicoideae
- Supertribe: Andropogonodae
- Tribe: Andropogoneae
- Subtribe: Andropogoninae
- Genus: Themeda; Forssk.

Type species
- Themeda triandra Forssk.

Synonyms
- Androscepia Brongn.; Anthistiria L.f.; Aristaria Jungh.; Heterelytron Jungh.; Perobachne J.Presl

= Themeda =

Genus of grasses

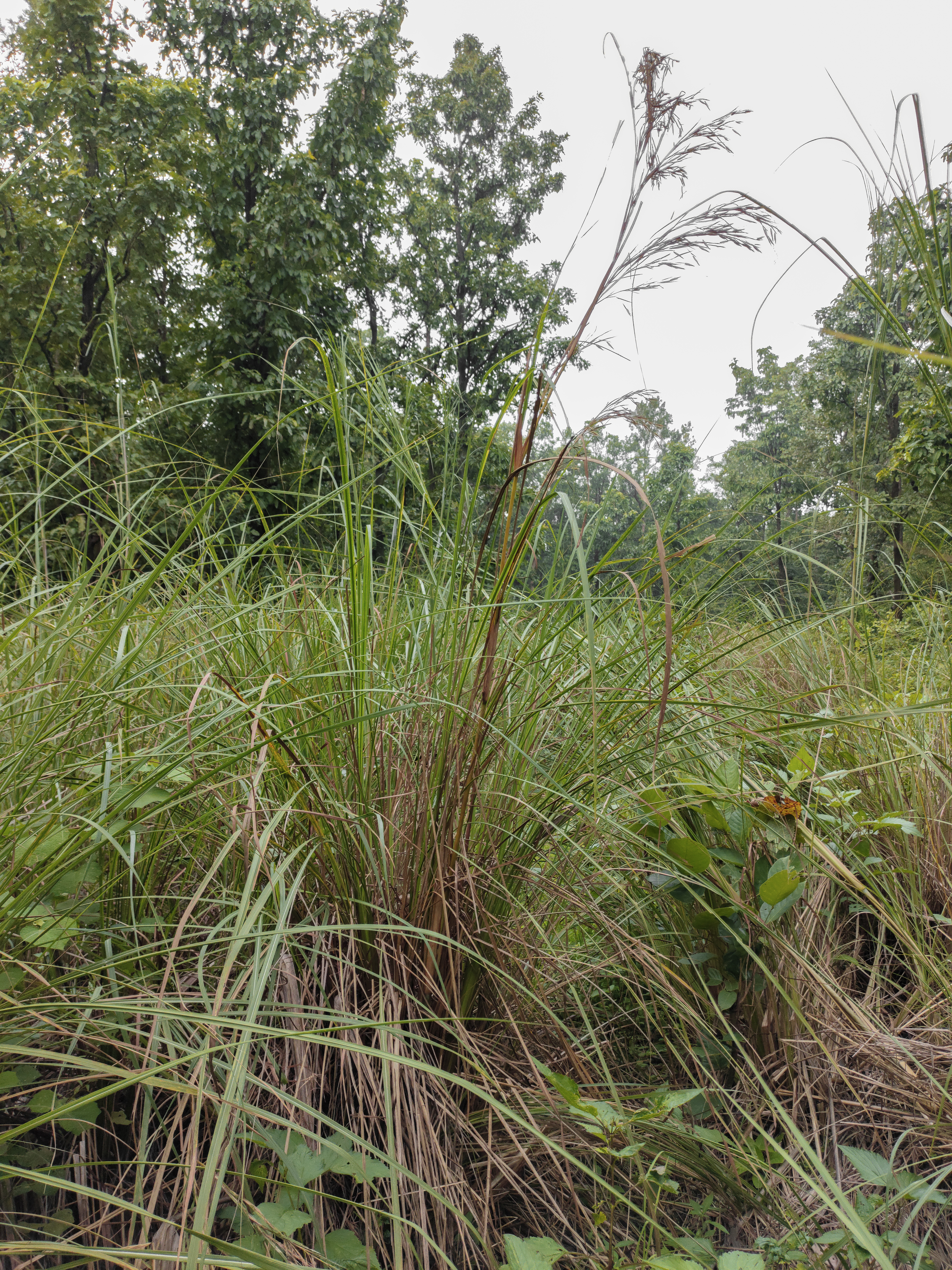
Themeda arundinacea (Roxb.) A. Camus, complete habit.

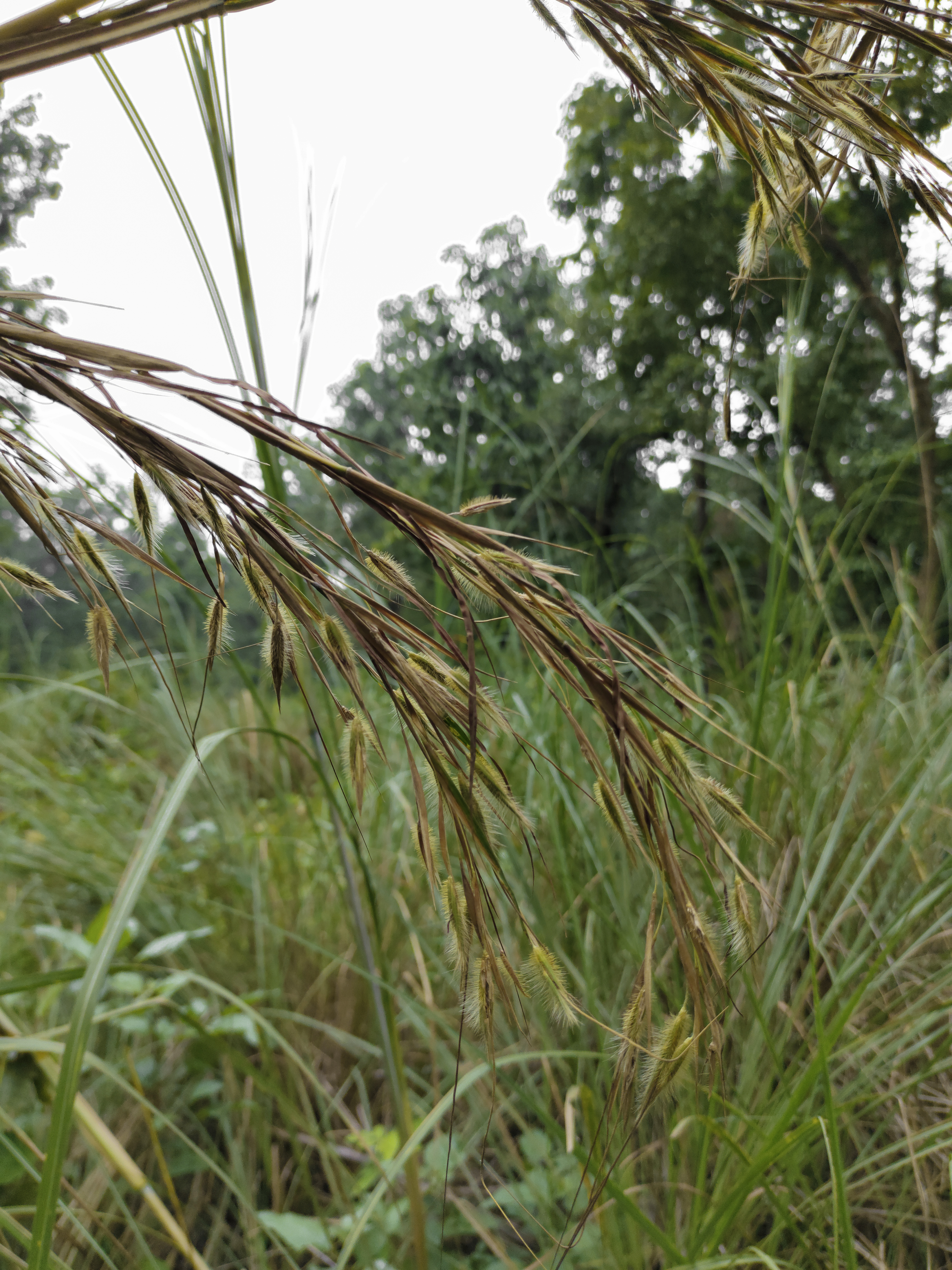
Themeda arundinacea (Roxb.) A. Camus, inflorescence.

Themeda is a genus of plants in the grass family native to Asia, Africa, Australia, and Papuasia. There are about 18 to 26 species, many of which are native to Southeast Asia.

Species

- Themeda anathera (Nees ex Steud.) Hack. - Afghanistan, Himalayas, Tibet
- Themeda arguens (L.) Hack. - Christmas grass - Sri Lanka, Southeast Asia, Papuasia, northern Australia
- Themeda arundinacea (Roxb.) A.Camus - Indochina, southern China, Indian Subcontinent, Malaysia, Indonesia
- Themeda avenacea (F. Muell.) Maiden & Betche - oat kangaroo grass - Australia
- Themeda caudata (Nees ex Hook. & Arn.) A.Camus - Indochina, southern China, Himalayas, Malaysia, Indonesia, Philippines
- Themeda cymbaria Hack. - Tamil Nadu, Sri Lanka, Kerala
- Themeda gigantea (Cav.) Hack. - Southeast Asia, Papuasia, New Caledonia, Vanuatu
- Themeda helferi Hack. - Myanmar, Andaman Islands, Yunnan
- Themeda hookeri (Griseb.) A.Camus - Tibet, Yunnan, eastern Himalayas
- Themeda huttonensis Bor - Assam
- Themeda idjensis Jansen - Java Timur, Bali
- Themeda intermedia (Hack.) Bor - Southeast Asia, China, Indian Subcontinent, Papuasia, Queensland, Vanuatu
- Themeda laxa (Andersson) A.Camus Indian Subcontinent
- Themeda minor L.Liou - Tibet
- Themeda mooneyi Bor - Odisha
- Themeda novoguineensis (Reeder) Jansen - Papua New Guinea, Lesser Sunda Islands
- Themeda palakkadensis Chorghe, Prasad & Lakshminarasimhan - Kerala
- Themeda pseudotremula Potdar et al. - Maharashtra
- Themeda quadrivalvis- grader grass (L.) Kuntze - Indian Subcontinent, Myanmar, Andaman Islands; naturalized in Socotra, South Africa, eastern Indochina, Papuasia, Queensland, Mexico, Brazil, Argentina, various islands (Indian and Pacific Oceans, West Indies)
- Themeda sabarimalayana Sreek. & V.J.Nair - India
- Themeda saxicola Bor - Odisha
- Themeda strigosa (Ham. ex Hook.f.) A.Camus - India, Bangladesh
- Themeda tremula (Nees ex Steud.) Hack. - India, Sri Lanka, Bangladesh
- Themeda triandra Forssk.- kangaroo grass, red grass, rooigras - Africa (from Morocco to KwaZulu-Natal), Asia (from Yemen to Japan to Maluku), Australia, New Guinea
- Themeda trichiata S.L.Chen & T.D.Zhuang - Guangxi, Yunnan, Hainan
- Themeda unica S.L.Chen & T.D.Zhuang - Anhui, Zhejiang
- Themeda villosa (Poir.) A.Camus - silky kangaroo grass, Lyon's grass - China, Indian Subcontinent, Indochina, Philippines, Indonesia, New Guinea
- Themeda yunnanensis S.L.Chen & T.D.Zhuang - Yunnan

Formerly included
See Elymandra, Germainia, Hyparrhenia, Iseilema

- Themeda capitata - Germainia capitata
- Themeda capitata var. thorelii - Germainia thorelii
- Themeda effusa - Hyparrhenia familiaris
- Themeda foliosa - Hyparrhenia bracteata
- Themeda gossweileri - Elymandra gossweileri
- Themeda prostrata - Iseilema prostratum
