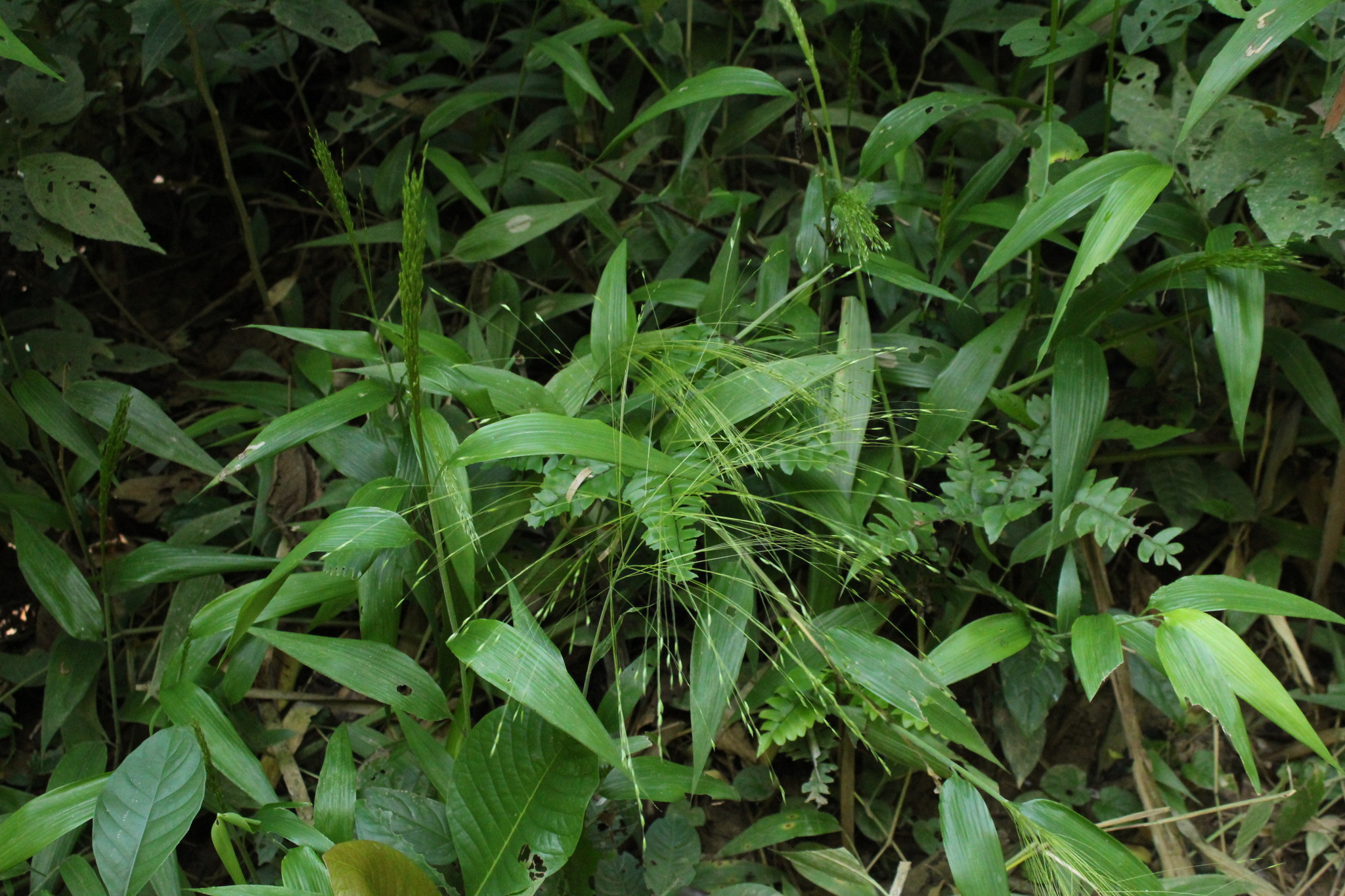
- Orthoclada laxa

Scientific classification
- Kingdom: Plantae
- Clade: Tracheophytes
- Clade: Angiosperms
- Clade: Monocots
- Clade: Commelinids
- Order: Poales
- Family: Poaceae
- Subfamily: Panicoideae
- Tribe: Zeugiteae
- Genus: Orthoclada; P.Beauv.

Type species
- Orthoclada rariflora (syn of O. laxa) P.Beauv.

= Orthoclada =

Genus of grasses

Orthoclada is a genus of African and Neotropical plants in the grass family.

Species

- Orthoclada africana C.E.Hubb. - Zaire, Tanzania, Zambia
- Orthoclada laxa (Rich.) P.Beauv. - southern Mexico, Central America, Lesser Antilles, Trinidad and Tobago, Venezuela, French Guiana, Suriname, Guyana, Colombia, Ecuador, Peru, Bolivia, Brazil
