= Pohlidium =

Scientific classification
- Kingdom: Plantae
- Clade: Tracheophytes
- Clade: Angiosperms
- Clade: Monocots
- Clade: Commelinids
- Order: Poales
- Family: Poaceae
- Subfamily: Panicoideae
- Tribe: Zeugiteae
- Genus: Pohlidium; Davidse, Soderstr. & R.P.Ellis
- Species: P. petiolatum

Binomial name
- Pohlidium petiolatum Davidse, Soderstr. & R.P.Ellis

Genus of grasses

Pohlidium is a genus of Panamanian plants in the family Poaceae. The only known species is Pohlidium petiolatum, native to Coclé Province in central Panama.
