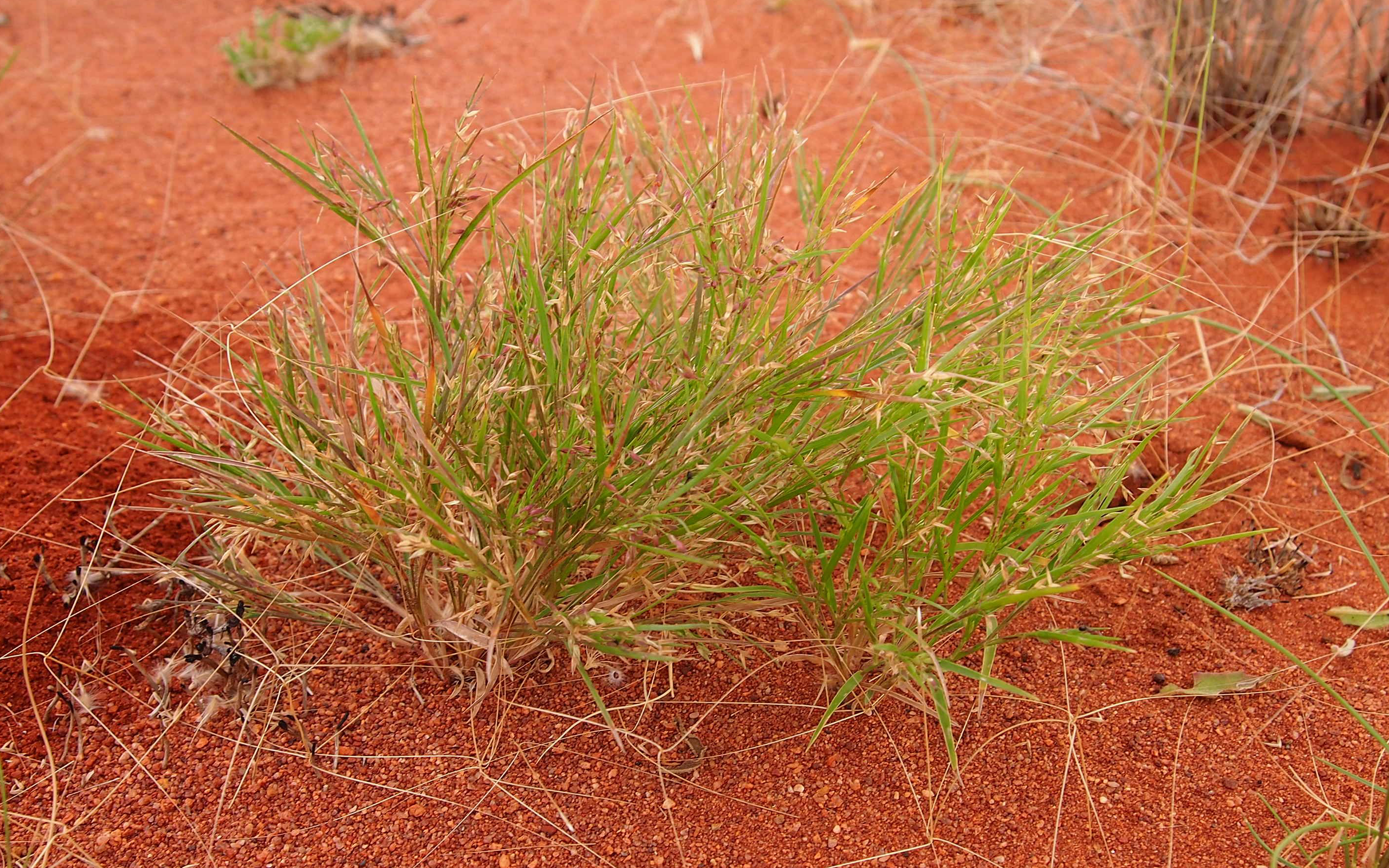

Scientific classification
- Kingdom: Plantae
- Clade: Embryophytes
- Clade: Tracheophytes
- Clade: Angiosperms
- Clade: Monocots
- Clade: Commelinids
- Order: Poales
- Family: Poaceae
- Subfamily: Panicoideae
- Genus: Panicum
- Species: P. australiense

Binomial name
- Panicum australiense Domin
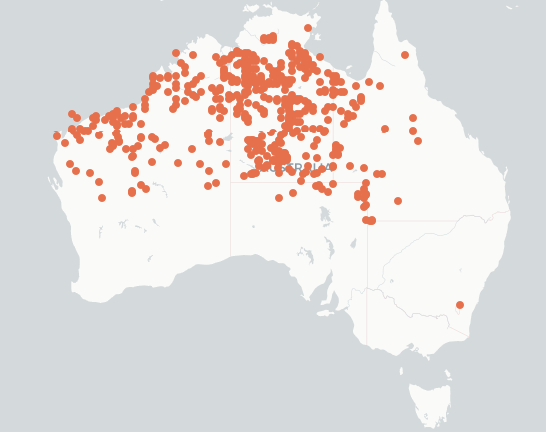
- Yakirra australiensis Occurrence record data from Atlas of Australia

Synonyms
- Ichnanthus australiensis; Yakirra australiensis

= Panicum australiense =

Species of grass

Panicum australiense, is a species of grass in the family Poaceae found in Australia. It is found in the states of Western Australia, Northern Territory, South Australia, Queensland and isolated spots in the NW of New South Wales. Its common names include Yakirra, bunch panic or desert flinders grass.

== Etymology and naming ==
The genus Panicum (panicgrass) is a large genus that includes over 500 species of grasses worldwide that are mostly native to tropical and subtropical regions. In Australia there are 33 species, 25 that are native and 8 that are naturalized. The name Yakirra is derived from the Aboriginal term for this species, while australiensis comes from the name Australia. Common names include bunch panic and desert flinders grass.

== Description ==
Panicum australiense is an annual or perennial graminoid, with herbaceous culms 5 to 30 cm tall, that are upright or slightly spreading, often zig-zagging or bending at the joints, and strongly branched at the base. The leaf blades are linear to lanceolate and measure 1.5-7 mm wide and 3-30 cm long and lack cross-venation. The primary branches are arranged all around the main axis and terminate in spikelets, which do not have stiff bristles.

== Distribution and habitat ==
P. australiense is found in arid or semi-arid sandy regions such as deserts or dry shrublands and thrives on sandplains, dunes and rocky outcrops, particularly in red or white sand and sandstone areas and in seasonally moist areas. In Western Australia it frequently occurs in areas such as both the Great and Little Sandy Deserts, the Pilbara and the Kimberly.

== Ecology ==
P. australiense grows as a leafy, compact annual or short-lived perennial, typically forming reddish or purple tufts. Leaf blades are smooth, and usually 3.5-6.5 cm long. They taper gradually to a fine, sharp point, with a fringe of hair at the base. Spikelets are solitary and usually 3.2-4.5 mm long, with pedicels 1-6 mm in length.

== Taxonomy ==
Panicum australiense is a member of Poales, the monocotyledonous flowering plants order, placed within the family Poaceae. There are two varieties of the species P. australiense: Panicum australiensis var. australiensis (which the primary branches are appressed to the main axis and Panicum australiensis var. intermedium (R.D. Webster) Zuloaga, which has inflorences that are more exserted from the leaf sheaths.

Panicum australiense was originally listed under the genus Panicum by Linnaeus in 1753. It was reclassified as Ichnanthus australiensis in 1923 by botanist Dorothy K. Hughes. It was then segregated into a genus established as Yakirra in 1985 by Lazarides and R.D.Webster to accommodate Australian species that were previously classified under Panicum and Ichnanthus when further revisions of Australian grasses proved it belonged to a distinct, native species rather than the tropical genus Ichnanthus. It was reclassified as a section of the genus Panicum in 2018 due to a molecular phylogenetic study.

== Reproduction and dispersal ==
Panicum australiensis var. australiensis flowers during March - August. Flowers grow in a spikelet in small compact clusters at the top of the plant, sometimes partially hidden inside the upper leaves. The small branched flower cluster usually measures 2 to 5mm in length, with the bottom of the flower cluster cupped by two supporting leaves (called glumes) that wrap around the flowers. Each branch holds a few individual short-stemmed flower clusters, that contain one empty (sterile) floret and one seed producing (fertile) floret.

The seeds which are produced between February to August are tiny, slightly flattened on one side, oval shaped and protected by a hard outer shell. The entire cluster falls off the plant to disperse and this occurs through both animals and abiotic factors such as wind and water.

== Uses ==
It has some bush food value, as Indigenous Australians have harvested the easily accessible seeds to use as a paste to produce flavored foods such as unleavened bread. Seeds are also one of the most important diet components for the bilby (Macrotis lagotis).

== Gallery ==
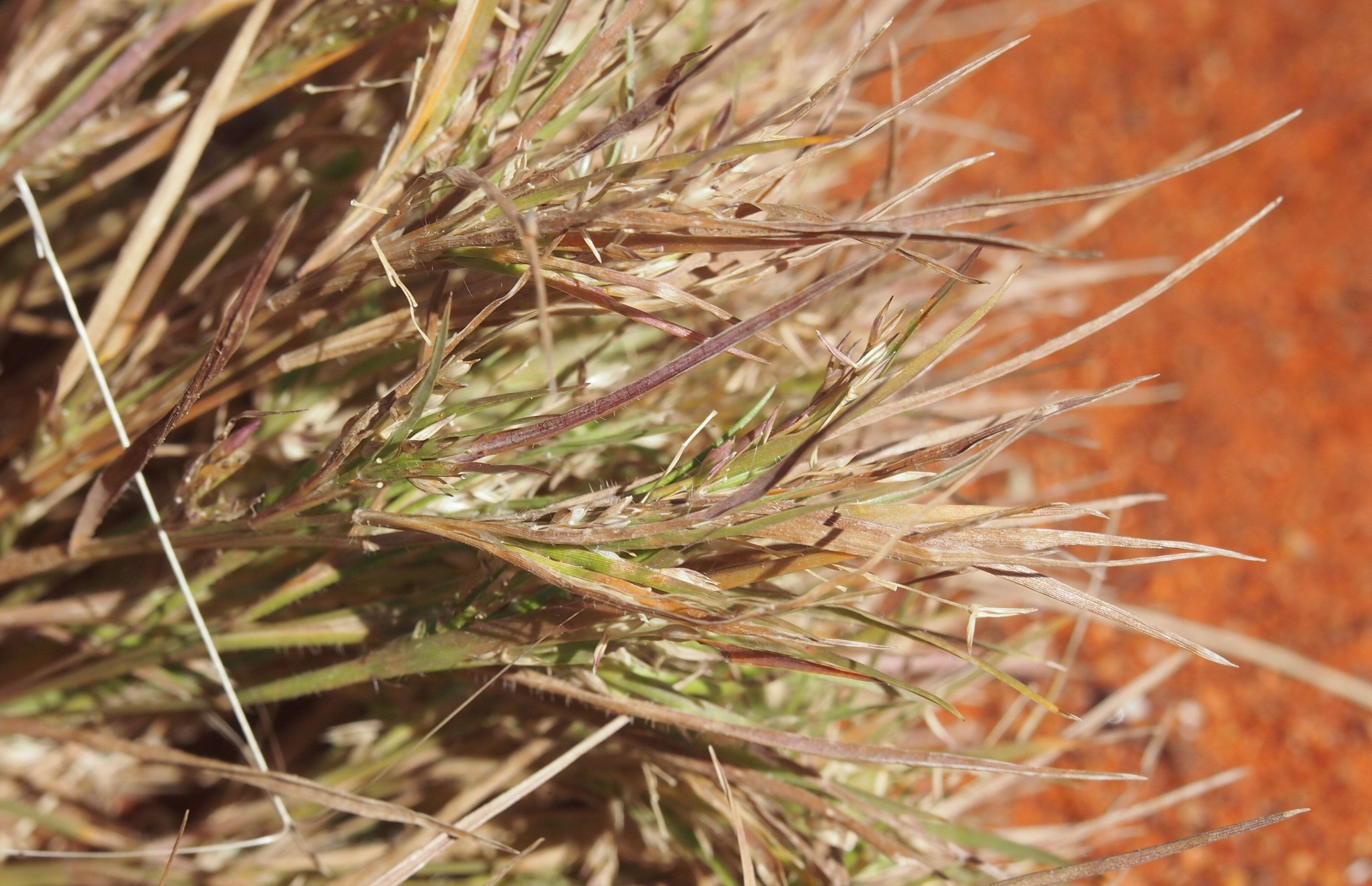
Seed head

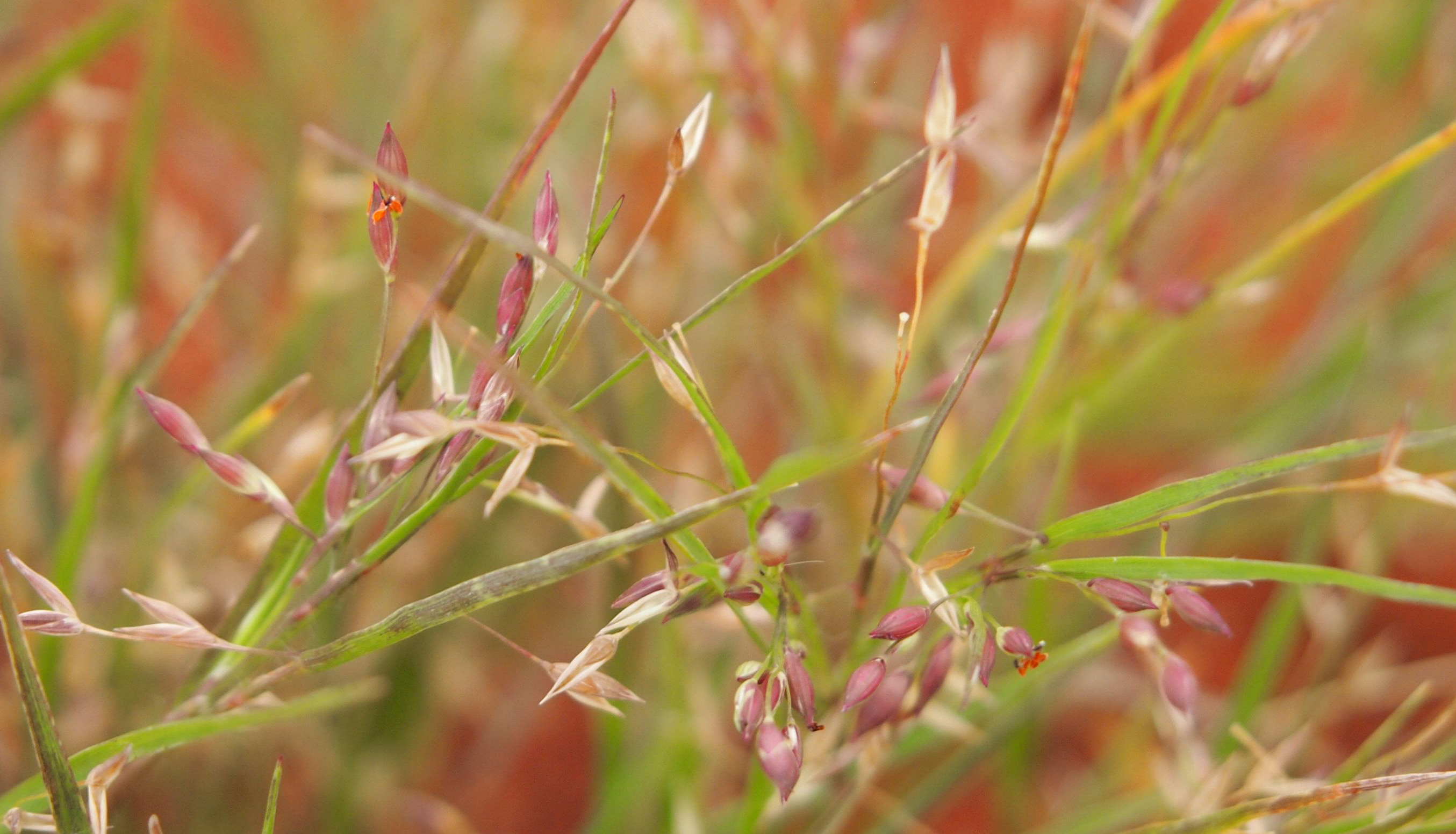
Flowers

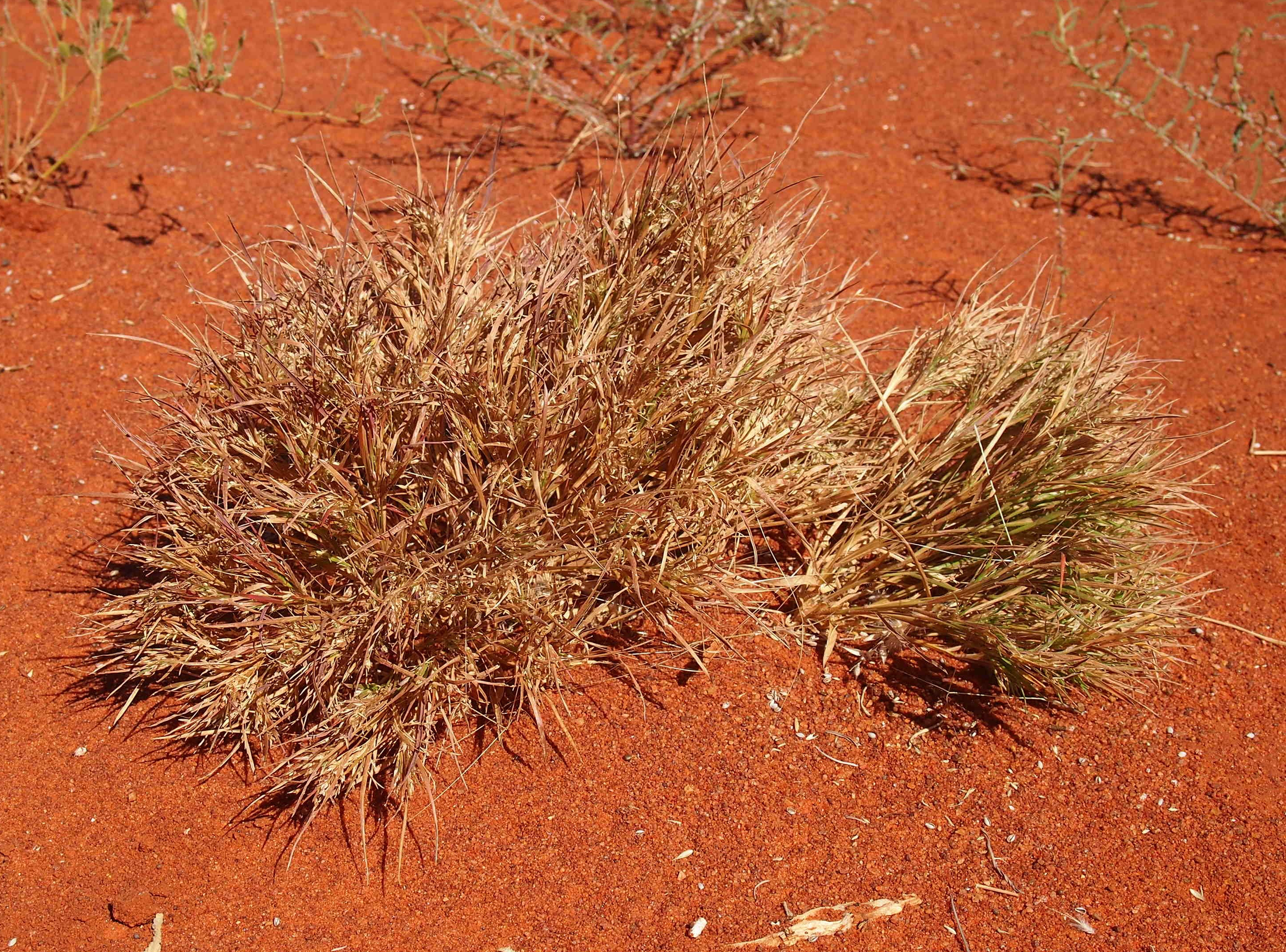
Habit
