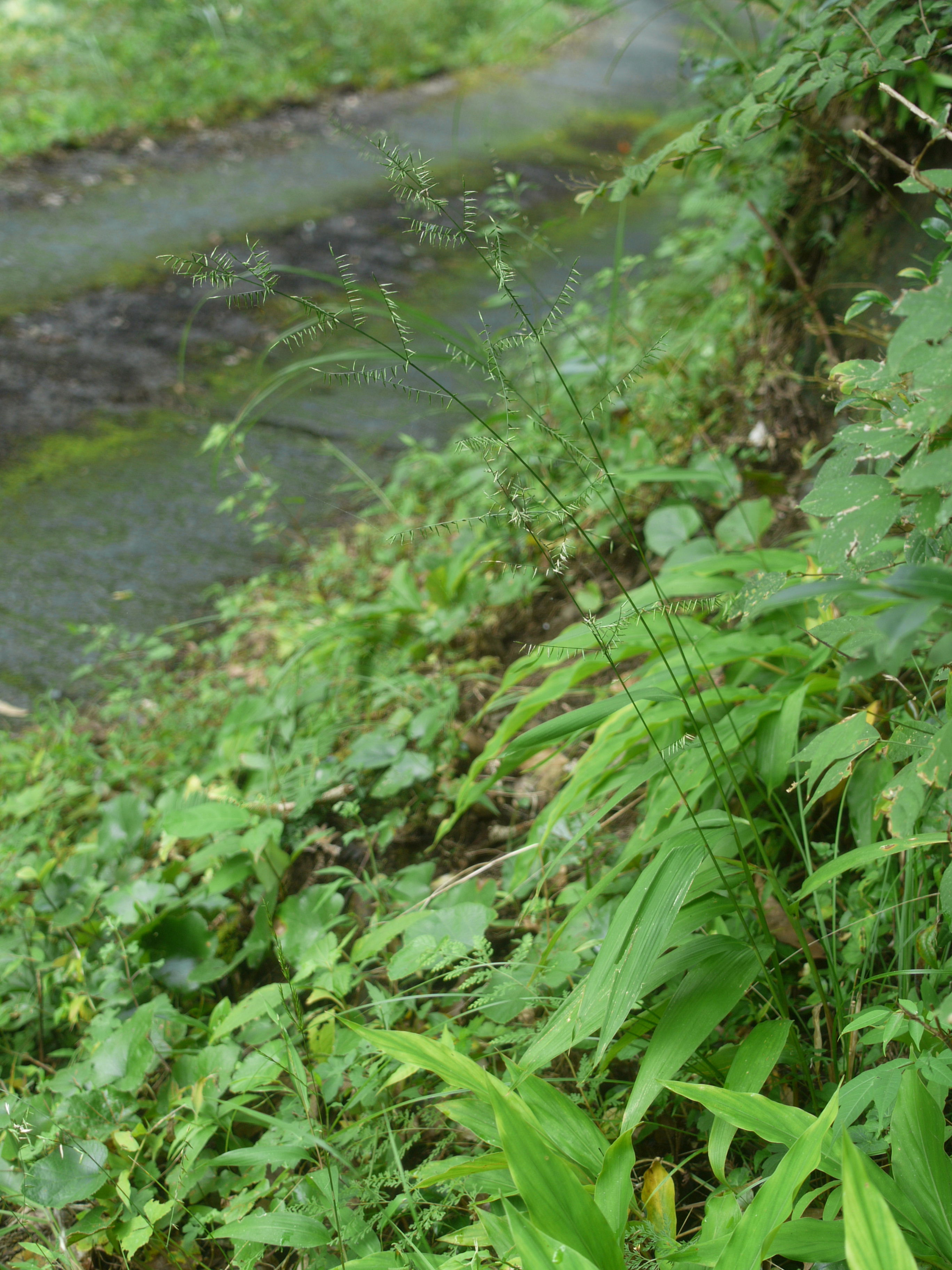

Scientific classification
- Kingdom: Plantae
- Clade: Tracheophytes
- Clade: Angiosperms
- Clade: Monocots
- Clade: Commelinids
- Order: Poales
- Family: Poaceae
- Subfamily: Panicoideae
- Tribe: Zeugiteae
- Genus: Lophatherum; Brongn.

Type species
- Lophatherum gracile Brongn.

Synonyms
- Acroelytrum Steud.; Allelotheca Steud.

= Lophatherum =

Genus of grasses

Lophatherum is a genus of Asian and Australian plants in the grass family.

Species

- Lophatherum gracile Brongn. - Anhui, Fujian, Guangdong, Guangxi, Guizhou, Hainan, Hubei, Hunan, Jiangsu, Jiangxi, Sichuan, Taiwan, Yunnan, Zhejiang, India, Nepal, Bhutan, Bangladesh, Sri Lanka, Indonesia, Japan, Korea, Malaysia, Indochina, Nepal, New Guinea, Philippines, Queensland
- Lophatherum sinense Rendle - Japan, Korea, Hunan, Jiangsu, Jiangxi, Zhejiang

Formerly included

see Poecilostachys

- Lophatherum geminatum - Poecilostachys geminata
