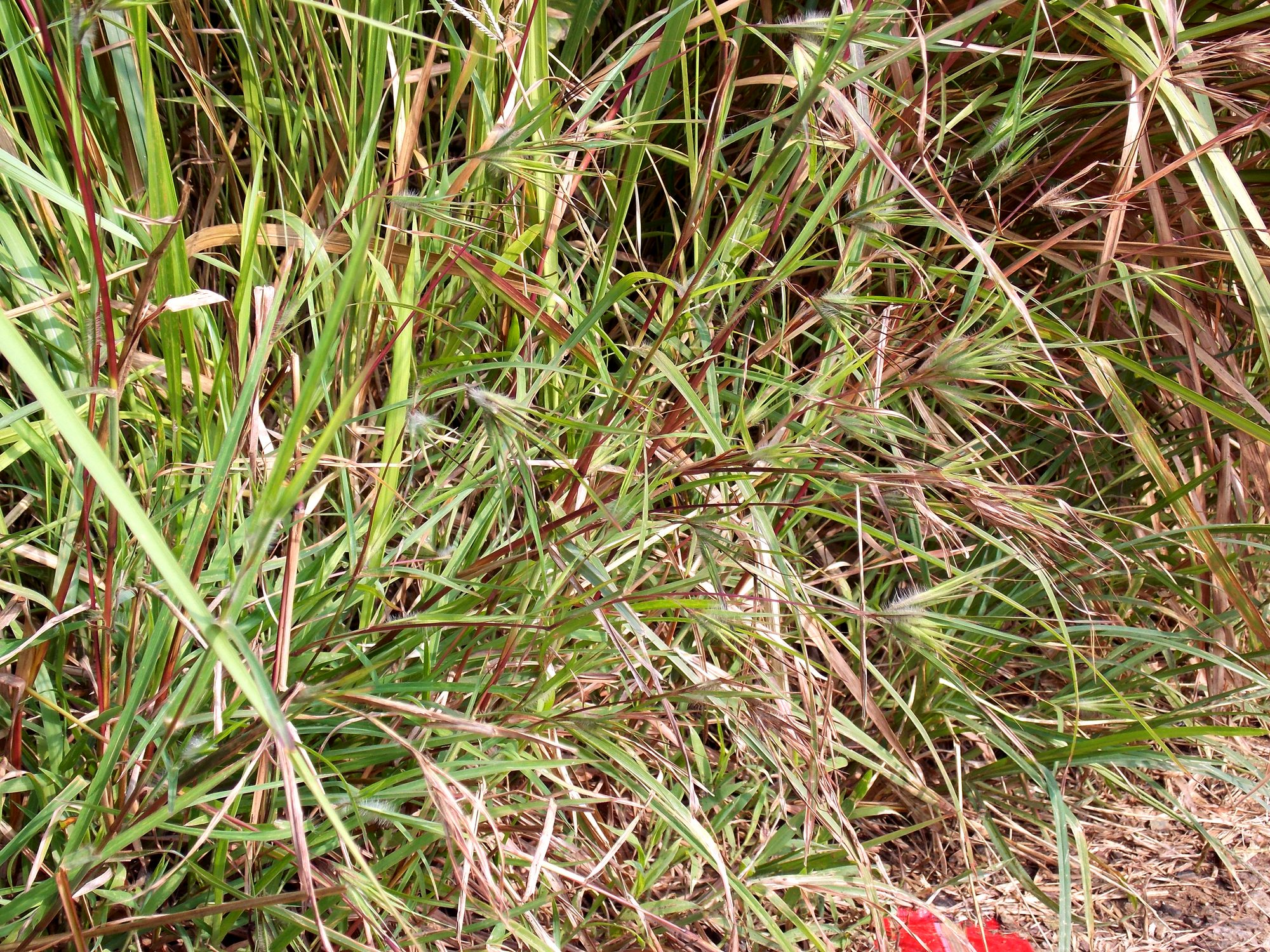

Scientific classification
- Kingdom: Plantae
- Clade: Tracheophytes
- Clade: Angiosperms
- Clade: Monocots
- Clade: Commelinids
- Order: Poales
- Family: Poaceae
- Subfamily: Panicoideae
- Genus: Themeda
- Species: T. arguens

Binomial name
- Themeda arguens (L.) Hack.

= Themeda arguens =

Species of grass

Themeda arguens, commonly known as Christmas grass, is a species of grass. It is found in South Asia, Eastern Asia, Australia, India, the south-western Pacific and the Caribbean.
