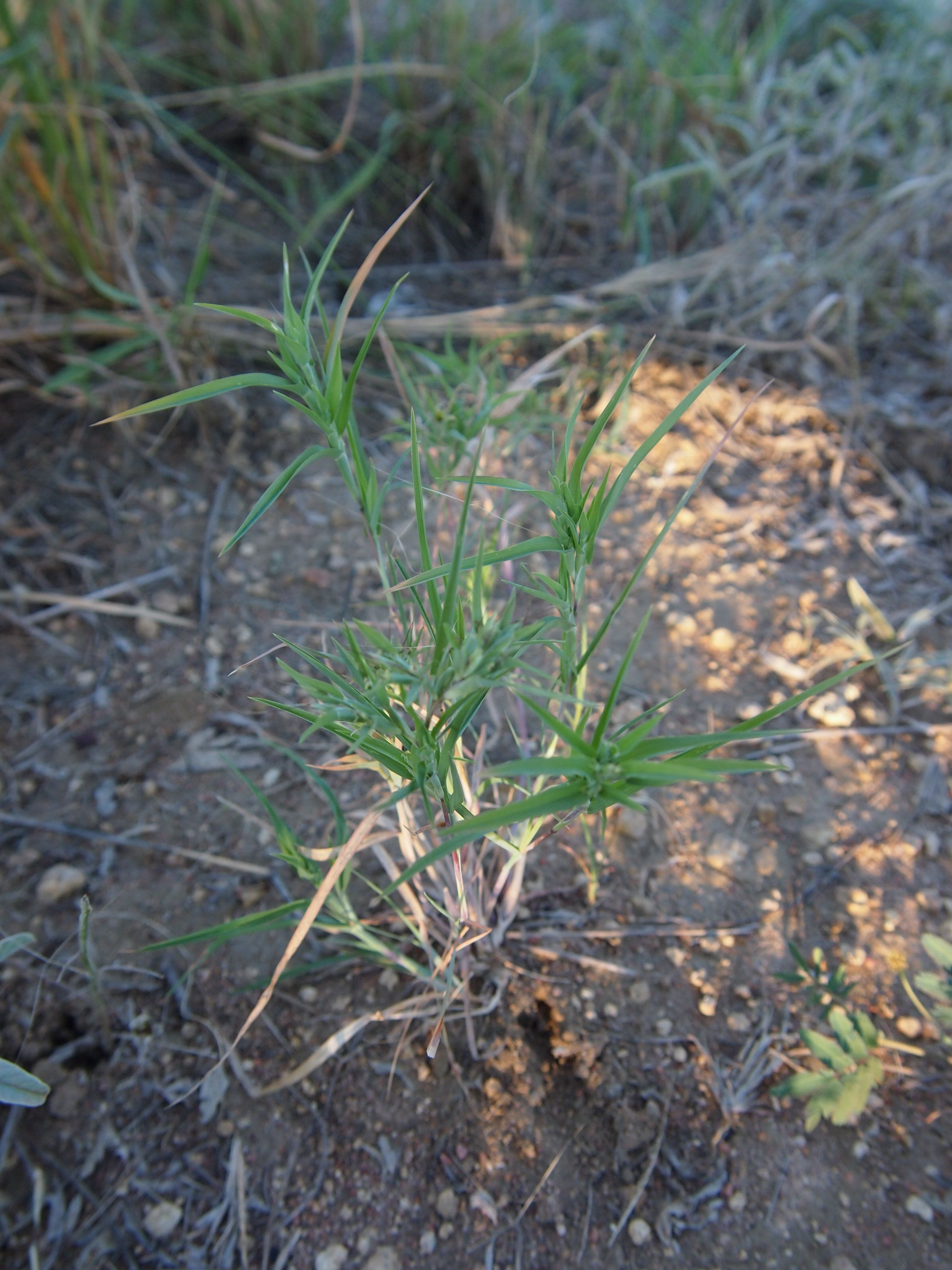
- Iseilema vaginiflorum

Scientific classification
- Kingdom: Plantae
- Clade: Tracheophytes
- Clade: Angiosperms
- Clade: Monocots
- Clade: Commelinids
- Order: Poales
- Family: Poaceae
- Subfamily: Panicoideae
- Supertribe: Andropogonodae
- Tribe: Andropogoneae
- Subtribe: Andropogoninae
- Genus: Iseilema; Andersson

Type species
- Iseilema prostratum (L.) Andersson

= Iseilema =

Genus of grasses

Iseilema, commonly known in Australia as Flinders grass, is a genus of Asian and Australian plants in the grass family.

Species

- Iseilema anthephoroides Hack. - India
- Iseilema argutum (Nees ex Steud.) Andersson - Java, Indochina
- Iseilema calvum C.E.Hubb. - Australia
- Iseilema ciliatum C.E.Hubb. - Australia
- Iseilema convexum C.E.Hubb. - Australia
- Iseilema dolichotrichum C.E.Hubb. - Australia
- Iseilema eremaeum S.T.Blake - Australia
- Iseilema fragile S.T.Blake - Australia
- Iseilema holei Haines - India
- Iseilema holmesii S.T.Blake - Western Australia
- Iseilema hubbardii Uppuluri - India
- Iseilema jainiana P.Umam. & P.Daniel - Indian subcontinent, Myanmar
- Iseilema macratherum Domin - Australia
- Iseilema maculatum Jansen - Wetar in Maluku
- Iseilema membranaceum (Lindl.) Domin - Australia
- Iseilema minutiflorum Jansen - Sumba in Nusa Tenggara Timur
- Iseilema prostratum (L.) Andersson - Indian subcontinent, Indochina
- Iseilema schmidii A.Camus - Cambodia
- Iseilema siamense C.E.Hubb. - Cambodia, Thailand
- Iseilema thorelii A.Camus - Laos, Thailand, Vietnam
- Iseilema trichopus (Benth.) C.E.Hubb. - Australia
- Iseilema vaginiflorum Domin - Australia
- Iseilema venkateswarlui Atyavathi - India
- Iseilema windersii C.E.Hubb. - Australia
