= Chevalierella =

Scientific classification
- Kingdom: Plantae
- Clade: Tracheophytes
- Clade: Angiosperms
- Clade: Monocots
- Clade: Commelinids
- Order: Poales
- Family: Poaceae
- Subfamily: Panicoideae
- Tribe: Zeugiteae
- Genus: Chevalierella; A.Camus
- Species: C. dewildemanii

Binomial name
- Chevalierella dewildemanii (Vanderyst) Van der Veken ex Compère

Synonyms
- Ichnanthus dewildemanii Vanderyst; Chevalierella congoensis A.Camus (type species)

Genus of grasses

Chevalierella is a genus of African plants in the grass family. The only known species is Chevalierella dewildemanii, native to Republic of Congo and to the Democratic Republic of the Congo.
