= Zeugites sylvaticus =

Scientific classification
- Kingdom: Plantae
- Clade: Tracheophytes
- Clade: Angiosperms
- Clade: Monocots
- Clade: Commelinids
- Order: Poales
- Family: Poaceae
- Subfamily: Panicoideae
- Genus: Zeugites
- Species: Z. sylvaticus

Binomial name
- Zeugites sylvaticus (Soderstr. & H.F.Decker) A.M.Soriano & Dávila

Synonyms
- Calderonella sylvatica Soderstr. & H.F.Decker

Species of plant

Zeugites sylvaticus is a species of perennial bunchgrass. It is native to Colombia and Panama. It was first described as Calderonella sylvatica in 1973, the only species of the genus Calderonella.
