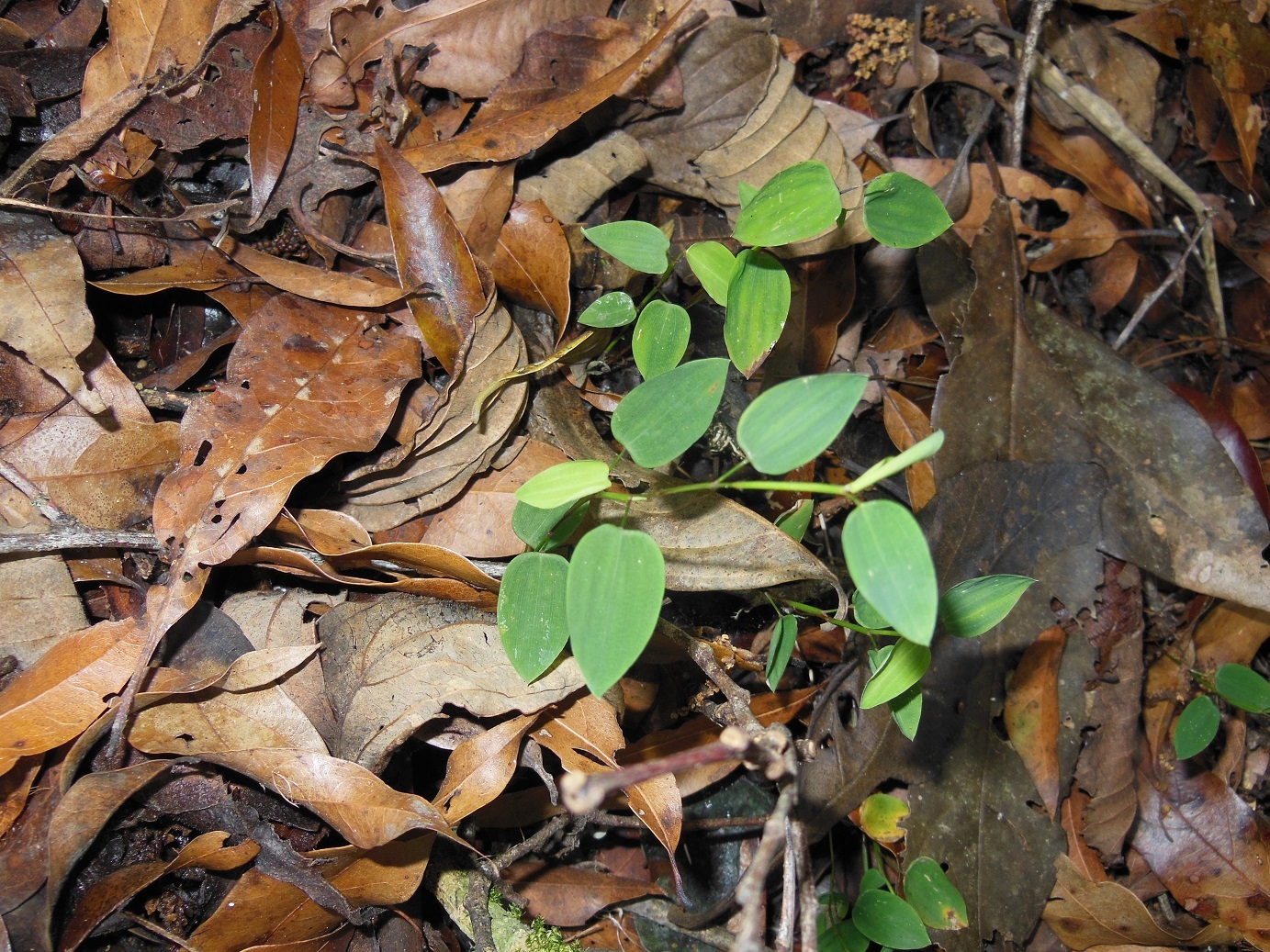
- Zeugites americanus

Scientific classification
- Kingdom: Plantae
- Clade: Tracheophytes
- Clade: Angiosperms
- Clade: Monocots
- Clade: Commelinids
- Order: Poales
- Family: Poaceae
- Subfamily: Panicoideae
- Tribe: Zeugiteae
- Genus: Zeugites; P.Browne

Type species
- Zeugites americanus Willd.

Synonyms
- Senites Adans., nom. superfl.; Calderonella Soderstr. & H.F.Decker; Despretzia Kunth; Krombholzia Rupr. ex E.Fourn.

= Zeugites =

Genus of grasses

Zeugites is a genus of flowering plants in the family Poaceae. Its species are native to the Caribbean, Mexico, Central America, and South America.

== Species ==
Species of Zeugites include:

- Zeugites americanus Willd. - from Mexico to Bolivia, and Greater Antilles in Caribbean
- Zeugites capillaris (Hitchc.) Swallen - Jalisco, Colima, México State, Guerrero, Oaxaca, Veracruz (México).
- Zeugites hackelii Swallen - Michoacán, Sinaloa, Jalisco, México State (México).
- Zeugites hintonii Hartley - México State
- Zeugites latifolius (E.Fourn.) Hemsl. - Jalisco, Guerrero, Oaxaca, and Chiapas (México), and Honduras
- Zeugites munroanus Hemsl. - Guatemala, El Salvador; and Chiapas, Veracruz (México).
- Zeugites panamensis Swallen - Costa Rica, Panama
- Zeugites pittieri Hack. - from Chiapas (México) to Panama
- Zeugites sagittatus Hartley - México State
- Zeugites smilacifolius Scribn. - Michoacán, Morelos, México State, Guerrero, Jalisco (México).
- Zeugites sylvaticus (Soderstr. & H.F.Decker) A.M.Soriano & Dávila - Panama, Colombia
