= Iseilema prostratum =

Scientific classification
- Kingdom: Plantae
- Clade: Embryophytes
- Clade: Tracheophytes
- Clade: Spermatophytes
- Clade: Angiosperms
- Clade: Monocots
- Clade: Commelinids
- Order: Poales
- Family: Poaceae
- Subfamily: Panicoideae
- Genus: Iseilema
- Species: I. prostratum

Binomial name
- Iseilema prostratum (L.) Andersson

Synonyms
- List: Andropogon prostratus L.; Anthistiria cimicina Edgew.; Anthistiria glandulosa Wight ex Steud.; Anthistiria linneana Steud.; Anthistiria prostrata (L.) Willd.; Anthistiria wightii Nees ex Steud.; Cymbopogon glandulosus Spreng.; Cymbopogon prostratus (L.) Sweet; Iseilema laxum Hack.; Iseilema wightii (Nees ex Steud.) Andersson; Themeda prostrata (L.) Roberty

Species of plant

Iseilema prostratum, called musal grass, is a species of flowering plant in the family Poaceae. It is native to the Indian Subcontinent, Myanmar, and Thailand. A tufted perennial reaching 60 cm (24 in), it is found in occasionally waterlogged soils in the seasonally dry tropics. It is highly palatable to cattle but disliked by sheep.
