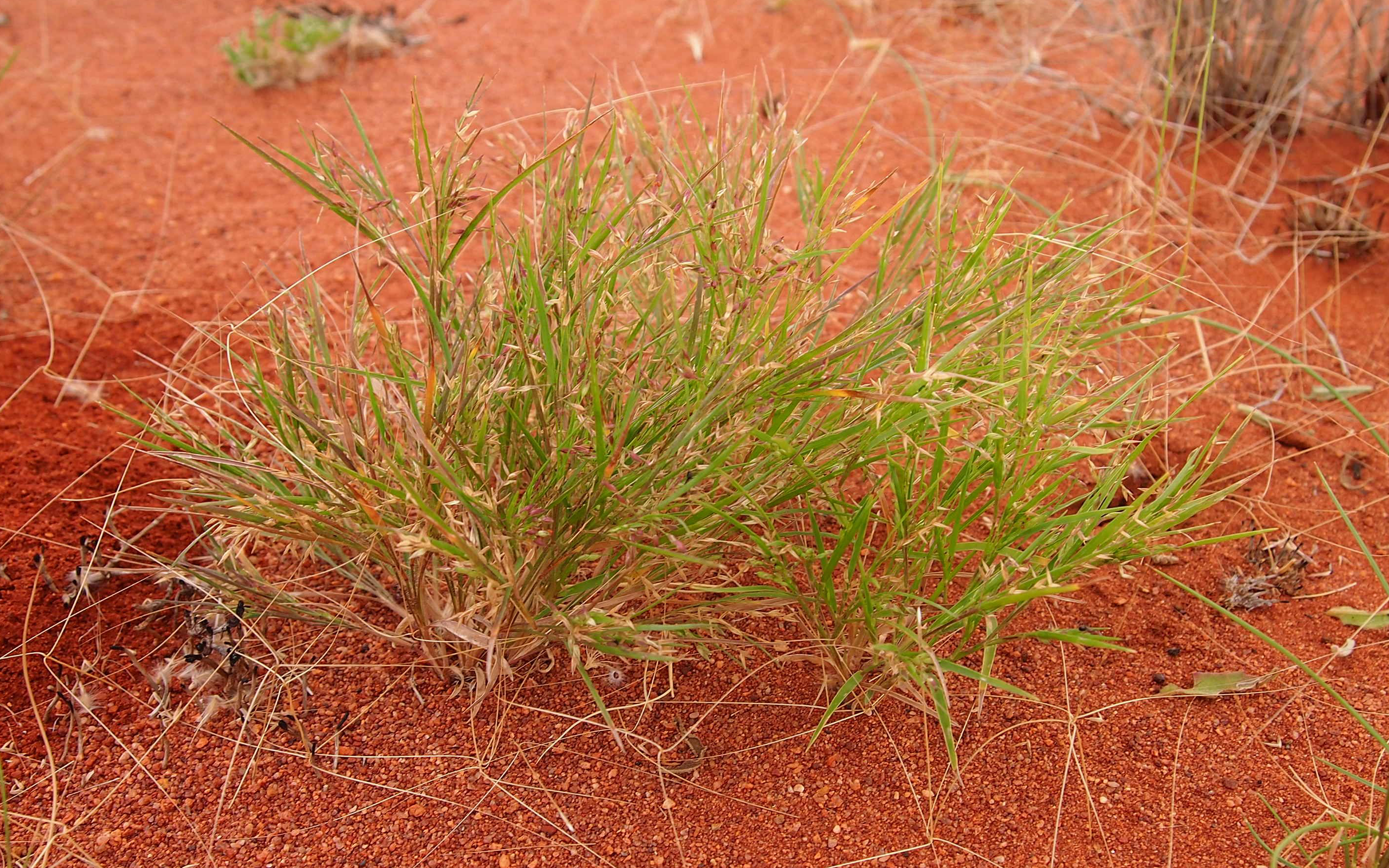
- Yakirra australiensis

Scientific classification
- Kingdom: Plantae
- Clade: Tracheophytes
- Clade: Angiosperms
- Clade: Monocots
- Clade: Commelinids
- Order: Poales
- Family: Poaceae
- Subfamily: Panicoideae
- Supertribe: Panicodae
- Tribe: Paniceae
- Subtribe: Panicinae
- Genus: Yakirra; Lazarides & R.D.Webster

= Yakirra =

Genus of grasses

Yakirra is a genus of Burmese and Australian plants in the grass family.

Species

- Yakirra australiensis (Domin) Lazarides & R.D.Webster - Northern Territory, Queensland, WAU, South Australia, New South Wales
- Yakirra foliolosa (Munro ex Hook.f.) Clayton - Myanmar
- Yakirra majuscula (F.Muell. ex Benth.) Lazarides & R.D.Webster - Northern Territory, Queensland, WAU
- Yakirra muelleri (Hughes) Lazarides & R.D.Webster - Northern Territory, Queensland, WAU
- Yakirra nulla Lazarides & R.D.Webster - Northern Territory
- Yakirra pauciflora (R.Br.) Lazarides & R.D.Webster - Northern Territory, Queensland, WAU
- Yakirra websteri B.K.Simon - Queensland
