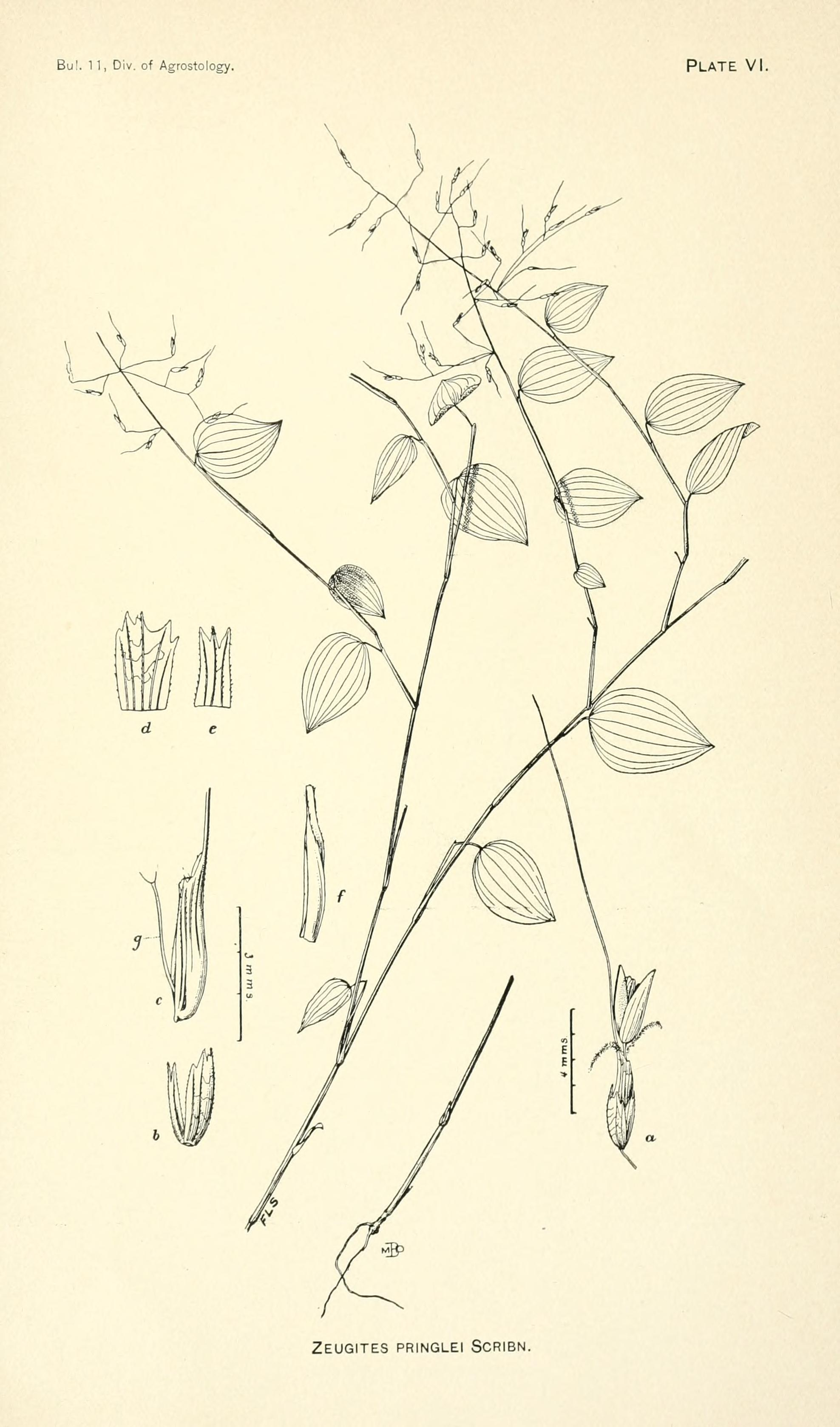

Scientific classification
- Kingdom: Plantae
- Clade: Tracheophytes
- Clade: Angiosperms
- Clade: Monocots
- Clade: Commelinids
- Order: Poales
- Family: Poaceae
- Subfamily: Panicoideae
- Genus: Zeugites
- Species: Z. americanus

Binomial name
- Zeugites americanus Willd.

Synonyms
- List: Apluda zeugites L.; Despretzia mexicana Kunth; Krombholzia mexicana (Kunth) Rupr. ex E.Fourn.; Panicum schiedei Spreng. ex Steud., pro syn.; Senites haitiensis (Pilg.) Hitchc. & Chase; Senites mexicanus (Kunth) Hitchc.; Senites pringlei (Scribn.) Hitchc.; Senites zeugites (L.) Nash ex Hitchc.; Zeugites americanus subsp. haitensis Pilg.; Zeugites americanus subsp. mexicanus (Kunth) Pilg.; Zeugites americanus var. mexicanus (Kunth) McVaugh; Zeugites americanus var. pringlei (Scribn.) McVaugh; Zeugites coloratus Griseb.; Zeugites galeottianus Hemsl.; Zeugites haitiensis (Pilg.) Urb.; Zeugites jamaicensis Raeusch., nom. nud.; Zeugites mexicanus (Kunth) Trin. ex Steud.; Zeugites mexicanus var. glandulosus Hack.; Zeugites pringlei Scribn.

= Zeugites americanus =

Species of grass

Zeugites americanus, synonyms including Zeugites pringlei, is a species of grass found from Mexico through Central America and northern and western South America to Bolivia, and in the Caribbean.
