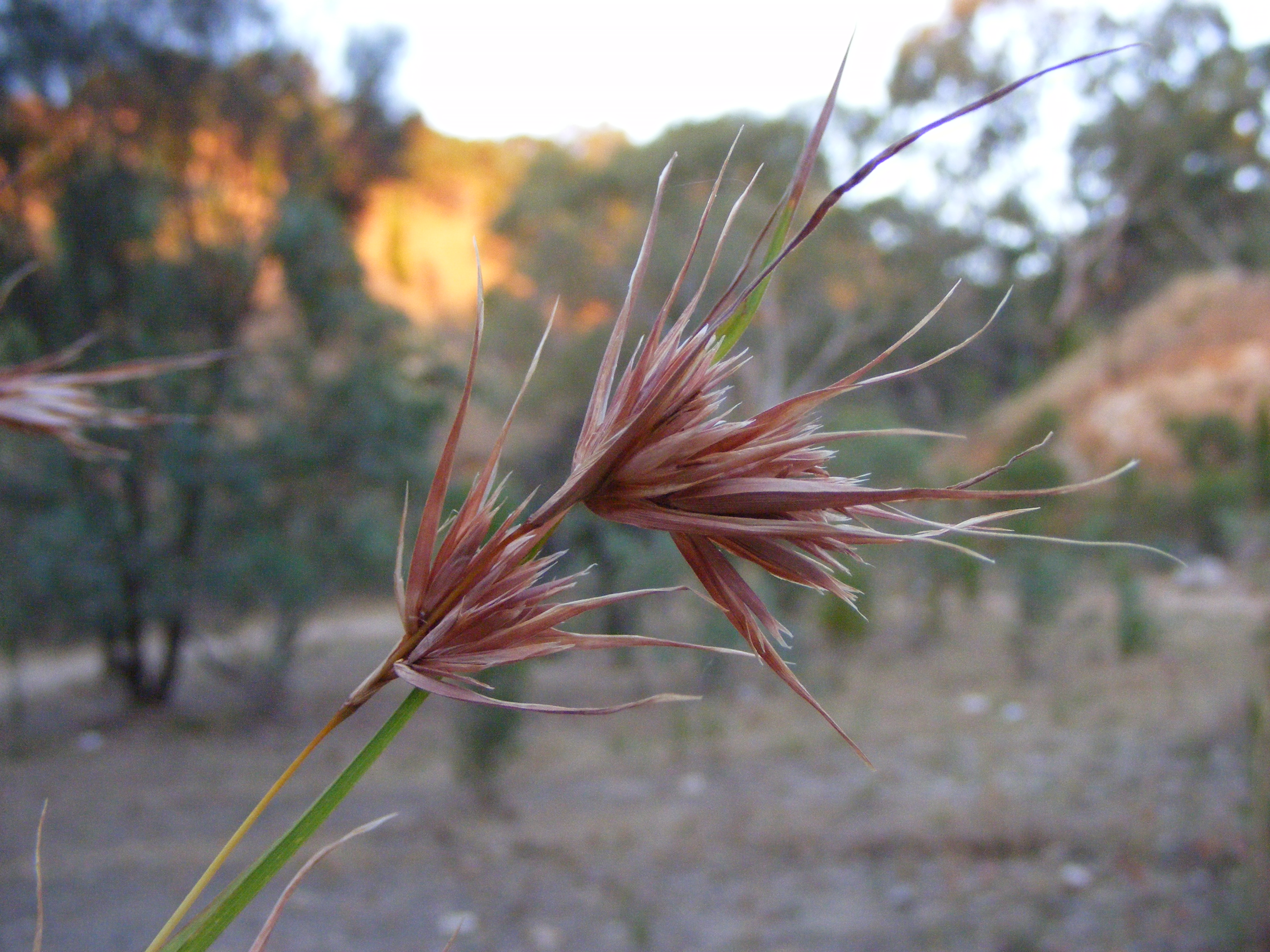

Scientific classification
- Kingdom: Plantae
- Clade: Embryophytes
- Clade: Tracheophytes
- Clade: Spermatophytes
- Clade: Angiosperms
- Clade: Monocots
- Clade: Commelinids
- Order: Poales
- Family: Poaceae
- Subfamily: Panicoideae
- Genus: Themeda
- Species: T. triandra

Binomial name
- Themeda triandra Forssk.

Synonyms
- List: Callista Lour.; Anthistiria australis R.Br.; Anthistiria australis R.Br. var. australis; Anthistiria australis var. colorata Andersson; Anthistiria australis var. concolor Andersson; Anthistiria australis var. pubescens Andersson; Anthistiria caespitosa Andersson; Anthistiria ciliata var. imberbis (Retz.) Nees; Anthistiria cuspidata Andersson; Anthistiria forskalii Kunth; Anthistiria imberbis Retz.; Anthistiria vulgaris Hack.; Anthistiria vulgaris var. imberbis (Retz.) Hack. [[Nomen illegitimum}nom. illeg.]]; Themeda arguens subvar. imberbis (Retz.) Roberty; Themeda australis (R.Br.) Stapf; Themeda forskallii (Kunth) Hack. ex Duthie; Themeda forskallii subvar. caespitosa (Andersson) Hack.; Themeda forskallii (Kunth) Hack. ex Duthie subvar. forskallii; Themeda forskallii subvar. grandiflora Hack.; Themeda forskallii subvar. lagopus Hack.; Themeda forskallii (Kunth) Hack. ex Duthie var. forskallii; Themeda forskallii var. imberbis (Retz.) Hack.; Themeda imberbis (Retz.) T.Cooke; Themeda triandra subvar. cuspidata (Andersson) Domin nom. alt.; Themeda triandra subvar. grandiflora (Hack.) Domin nom. alt.; Themeda triandra subvar. lagopus (Hack.) Domin nom. alt.; Themeda triandra subvar. oligotricha Domin nom. alt.; Themeda triandra var. caesia Domin; Themeda triandra var. fascicularis Domin; Themeda triandra var. praealta Domin; Themeda triandra var. rigidiuscula Domin; Themeda triandra Forssk. var. triandra; Themeda triandra var. trichospatha Domin; Themeda triandra var. vulgaris (Hack.) Domin; Themeda triandra var. xiphium Domin; Anthistiria ciliata auct. non L.f.: Bentham, G.

= Themeda triandra =

Species of plant

Themeda triandra is a species of C_{4} perennial tussock-forming grass widespread in Africa, Australia, Asia and the Pacific. In Australia it is commonly known as kangaroo grass and in East Africa and South Africa it is known as red grass and red oat grass or as rooigras in Afrikaans. Kangaroo grass was formerly thought to be one of two species, and was named Themeda australis.

The plant has traditional uses as food and medicine in Africa and Australia. Indigenous Australians harvested it to make bread and string for fishing nets around 30,000 years ago. It was used as livestock feed in early colonial Australia, but this use was largely replaced by introduced plants. As of 2021 there is a large government-funded project underway to investigate the possibility of growing kangaroo grass commercially in Australia for use as a regular food source for humans.

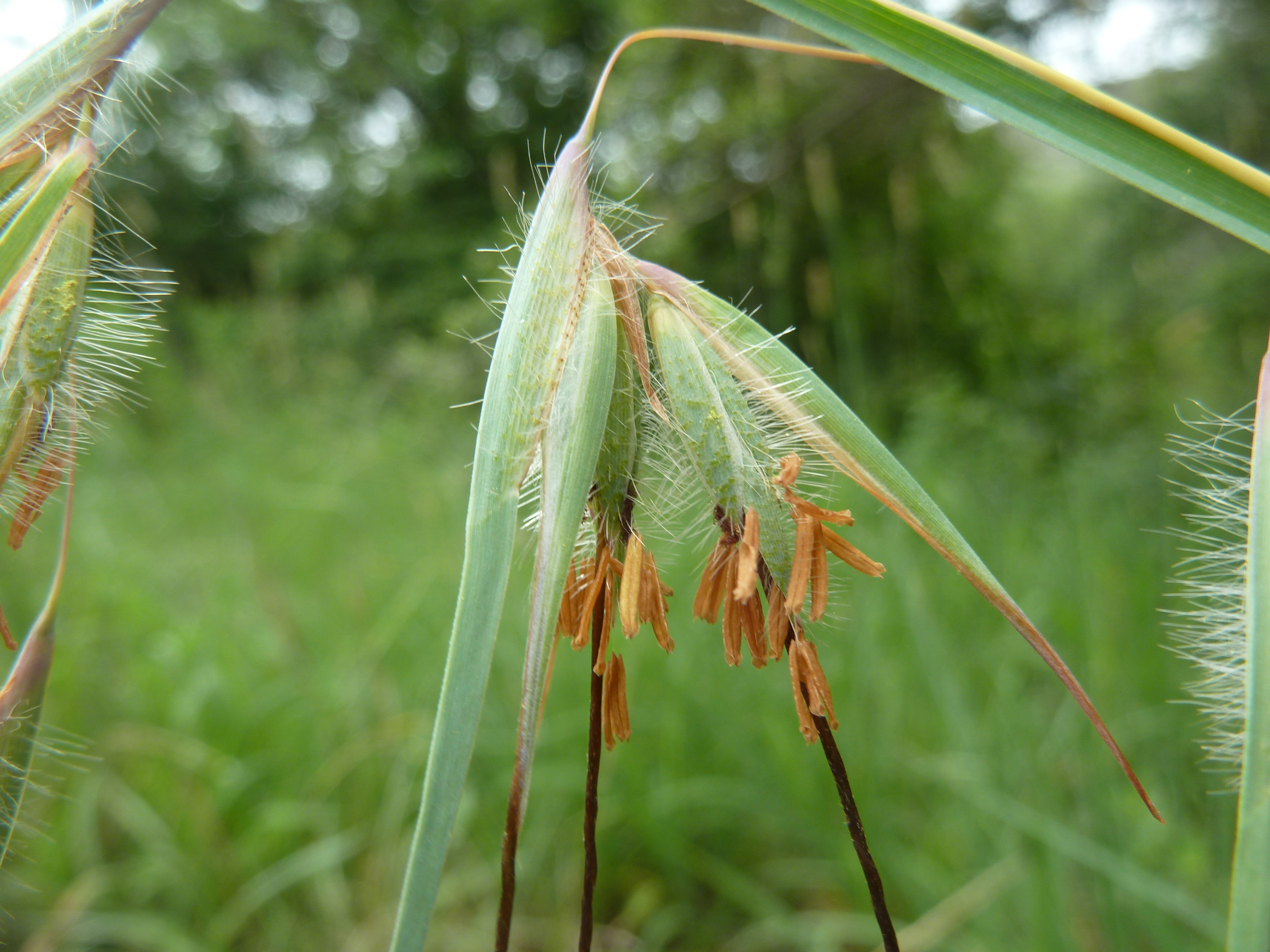
Flowering spikelet, South Africa

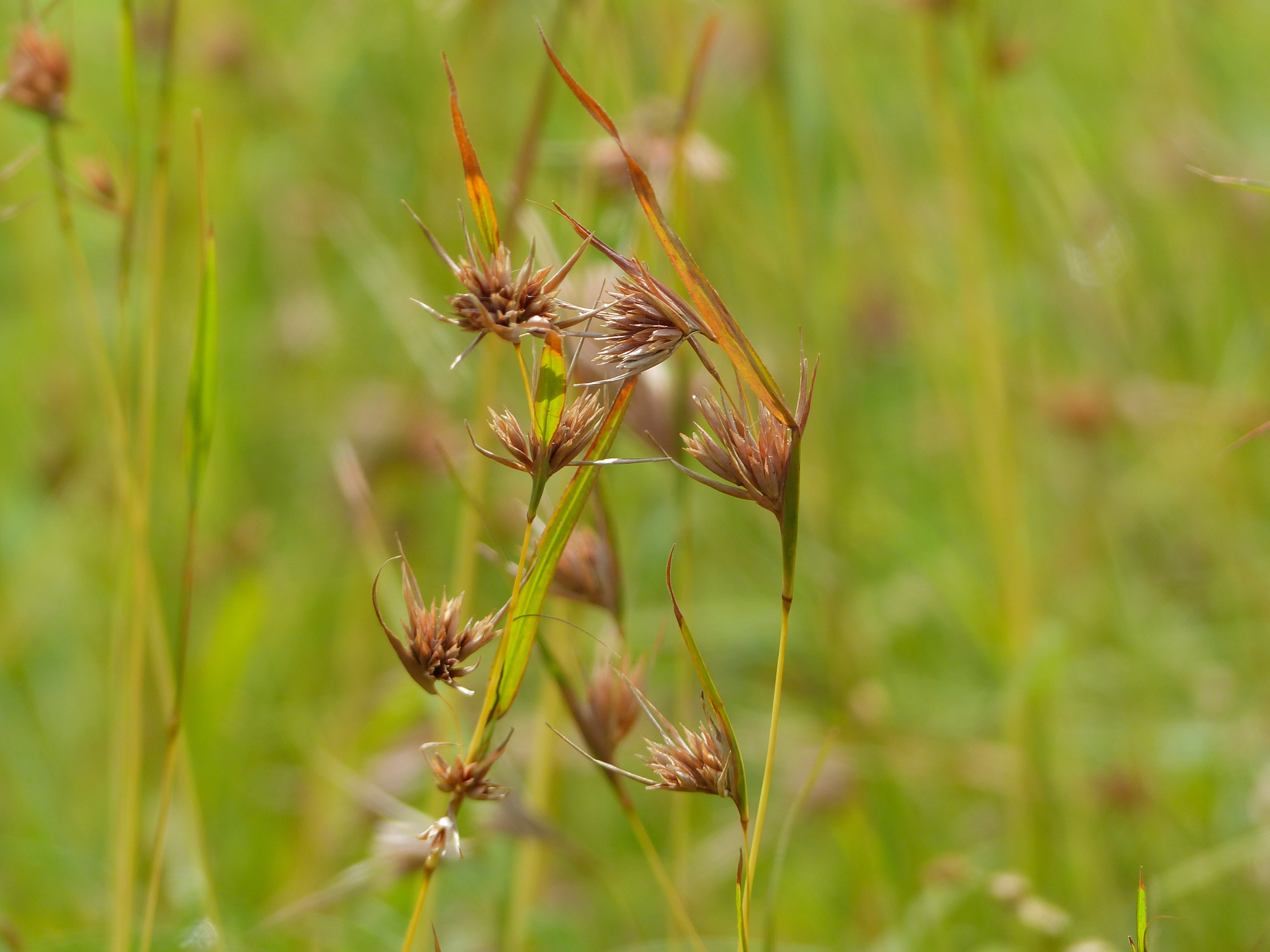
Dry spikelets, South Africa

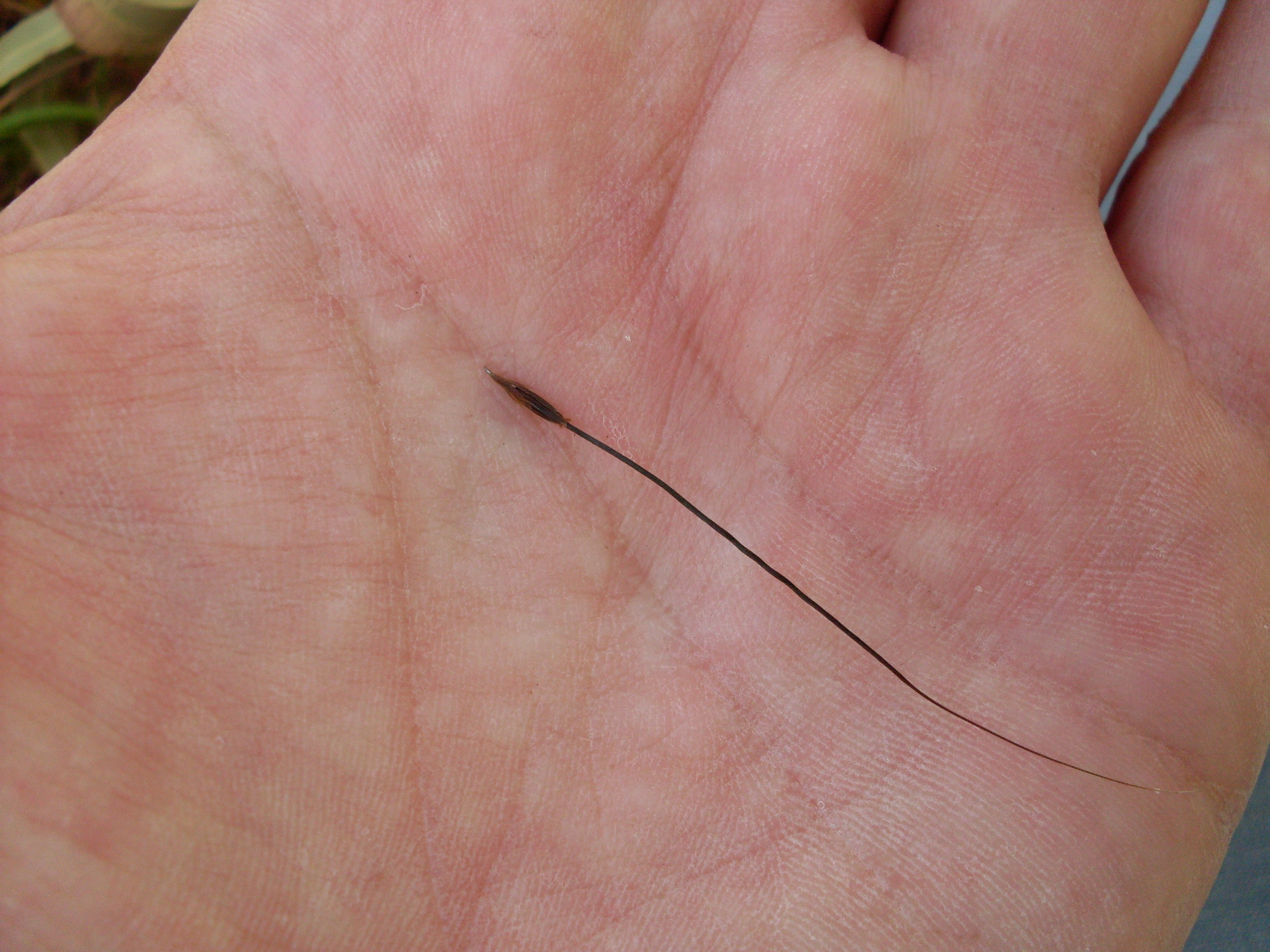
Single seed

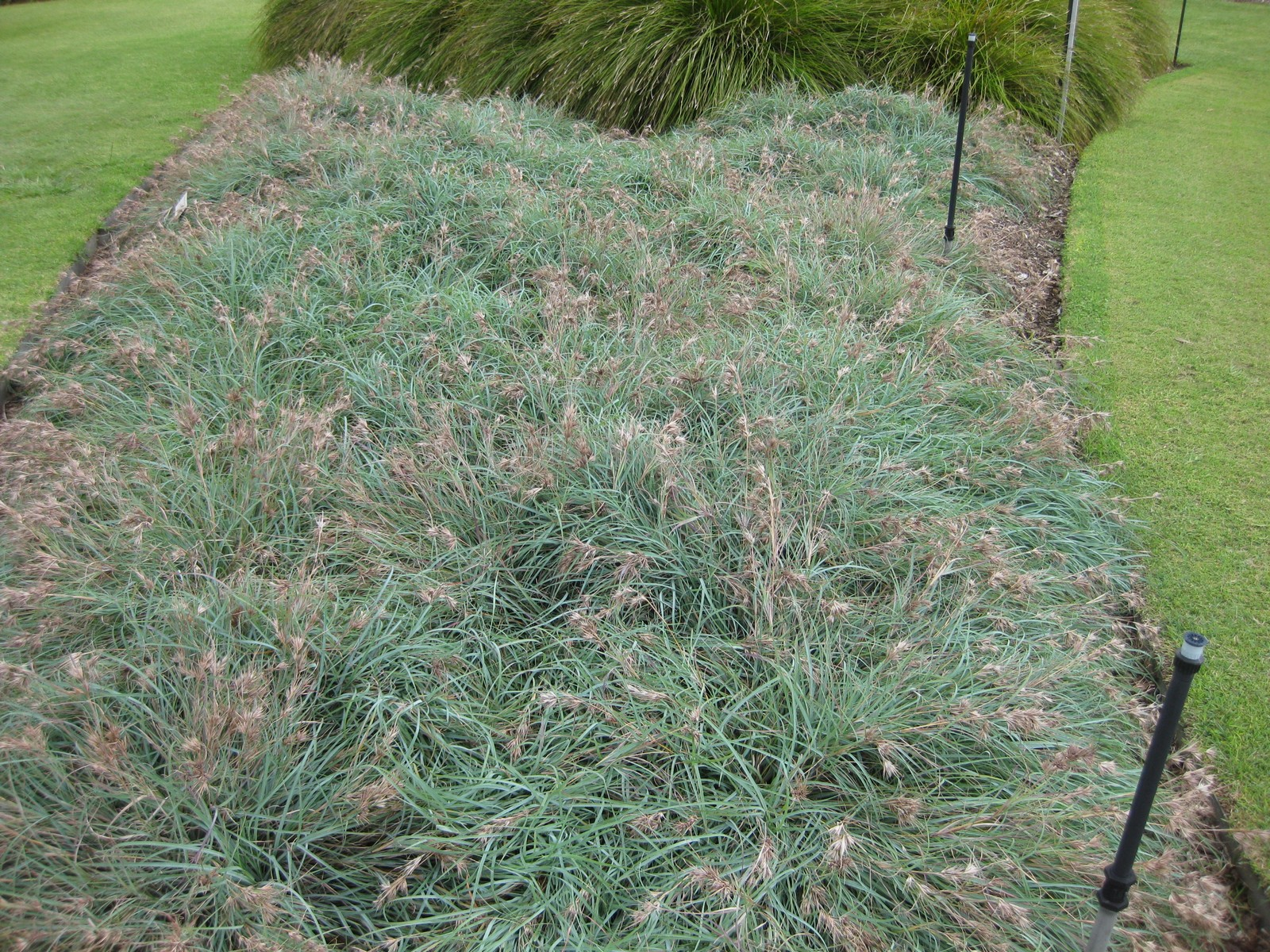
Cultivated in a botanical garden

== Description ==
Themeda triandra is a perennial grass which grows in dense tufts up to 1.5 metres (5 ft) tall and 0.5 m (1 1/2 ft) wide. It flowers in summer, producing large red-brown spikelets on branched stems. The leaves are 10–30 centimetres (4–12 in) in length and 1–8 millimetres (1/16–5/16 in) wide but can exceed 10–50 cm (4–19 1/2 in) long and 2–5 mm (1/16–3/16 in) wide. The leaves are grey-green in winter, turning red-brown in summer.

Its inflorescence is compounded, fasciculated, is 10–30 cm (4–12 in) long and composed of a single raceme. It pedicels are oblong and are 0.5 mm long while its lemma is 25–70 mm (1–2 3/4 in) long and is both apical and geniculate. The column of lemma's awn is hispidulous and twisted. The blooms exude a strong perfume. The seed head is large, often red-brown and made up of clustered spikelets.

== Taxonomy ==
Themeda triandra was first formally described in 1775 by Peter Forsskål who published the description in Flora Aegyptiaco-Arabica. There are many synonyms of this species. The specific epithet (triandra) is the feminine of the Botanical Latin adjective triandrus, meaning "with three stamens", based on the Greek-derived combining forms tri-, three, and -andrus, male.

Kangaroo grass was formerly thought to be one of two species, and was named Themeda australis.

== Distribution and habitat ==
Themeda triandra is found across Asia, Africa, Australia, and the Pacific. In Australia, it is found in all of the states and territories. It grows predominantly in grassland and open woodland communities. It is a significant species in temperate grasslands in Australia, a habitat considered to be endangered or threatened in various parts of the country. It does not do well under heavy grazing pressure, but benefits from occasional fire.

It tolerates a wide range of soils but is most common in moist microclimates such as roadsides and railway lines.

T. triandra occurs on a wide variety of soils from sandy soils to heavy clays. There seems to be little association between abundance of T. triandra and a specific soil type. It is often common in areas where moisture collects and grazing is light, such as along roadsides or railway lines.

== Uses ==
The young growth is palatable to livestock. It serves as a food source for several avian species, including the long-tailed widowbird, and is occasionally used as an ornamental plant.

Traditionally, in Uganda, the hollow stems of the grass are used as a thatch in hut construction, and for creating pulp for paper. T. triandra seed has also been used as a famine food in Africa. In West Africa, the root are used in the creation of a medicine used to treat dysmenorrhoea (painful periods).

In Australia, it is sometimes used as an ornamental plant in rockeries, as a substitute for a lawn, and in cooking. It has also been found to be useful in treating horses for obesity, insulin resistance, and foot inflammation, because it is lower in carbohydrates such as sugar, starch, and fructans than introduced grasses.

Before the colonisation of Australia, kangaroo grass used to be harvested by Aboriginal Australians, who used the leaves and stems for making string, the basis for fishing nets, as well as for food. The grains were harvested and ground into flour and porridge; the flour was used to make a traditional bread (later referred to as damper, although that term is mostly used for the bread made by non-Indigenous Australians), said to have a nutty flavour. Evidence has been found of this food production occurring around 30,000 years ago, with the grain considered to be a staple food and especially valuable in arid areas.

In recent years kangaroo grass has been looked upon as a weed which is sometimes eaten by livestock. As of 2021, a four-year research project supported by the Australian Government is being undertaken by researcher Dylan Male, at La Trobe University in collaboration with the Dja Dja Wurrung Aboriginal Clans Corporation of central Victoria, investigating the possibility of developing it as a food crop. It is hoped that kangaroo grass would be able to be grown on a commercial scale and become a regular food source. They have found tussocks of the grass estimated to be over 50 years old, an possibly unique among Australian grasses. The plant has several advantages over currently farmed grains:

- It can survive on land depleted by farming.
- It is very drought-resistant.
- It tolerates extreme changes in temperature.
- It is a perennial grass.
- It can help to restore already degraded grasslands.
- It contains 40 per cent more protein than traditional grains used for making bread.
- Because of the way it grows, forming a very dense tussock with its leaves bending outwards, it protects the soil and creates its own little ecosystem – it conserves moisture, creating habitat for small animals such as native insects and invertebrates.

However, at present the commercial viability of kangaroo grass is limited by low seed yields and poor knowledge of broadacre crop management.

The project will draw heavily on the knowledge of the traditional owners of the land, and there will be ongoing communication with farmers and Landcare Australia groups.

The project follows a smaller, crowdfunded project undertaken in 2017 by writer Bruce Pascoe on his own property in Gipsy Point, eastern Victoria, managed by volunteers, to develop several Indigenous Australian food crops, including murnong (yam daisy), kangaroo grass and native raspberries.

In 2020 Pascoe established the not-for-profit Aboriginal social enterprise Black Duck Foods in Mallacoota, Victoria. Black Duck Foods conducts research into native foods and is currently working on a roadmap for the native grains industry. They have small quantities of kangaroo and spear grass flour for sale on their website.

The University of Sydney has undertaken research into the nutritional value of kangaroo grass, finding that it is high in protein and minerals.
