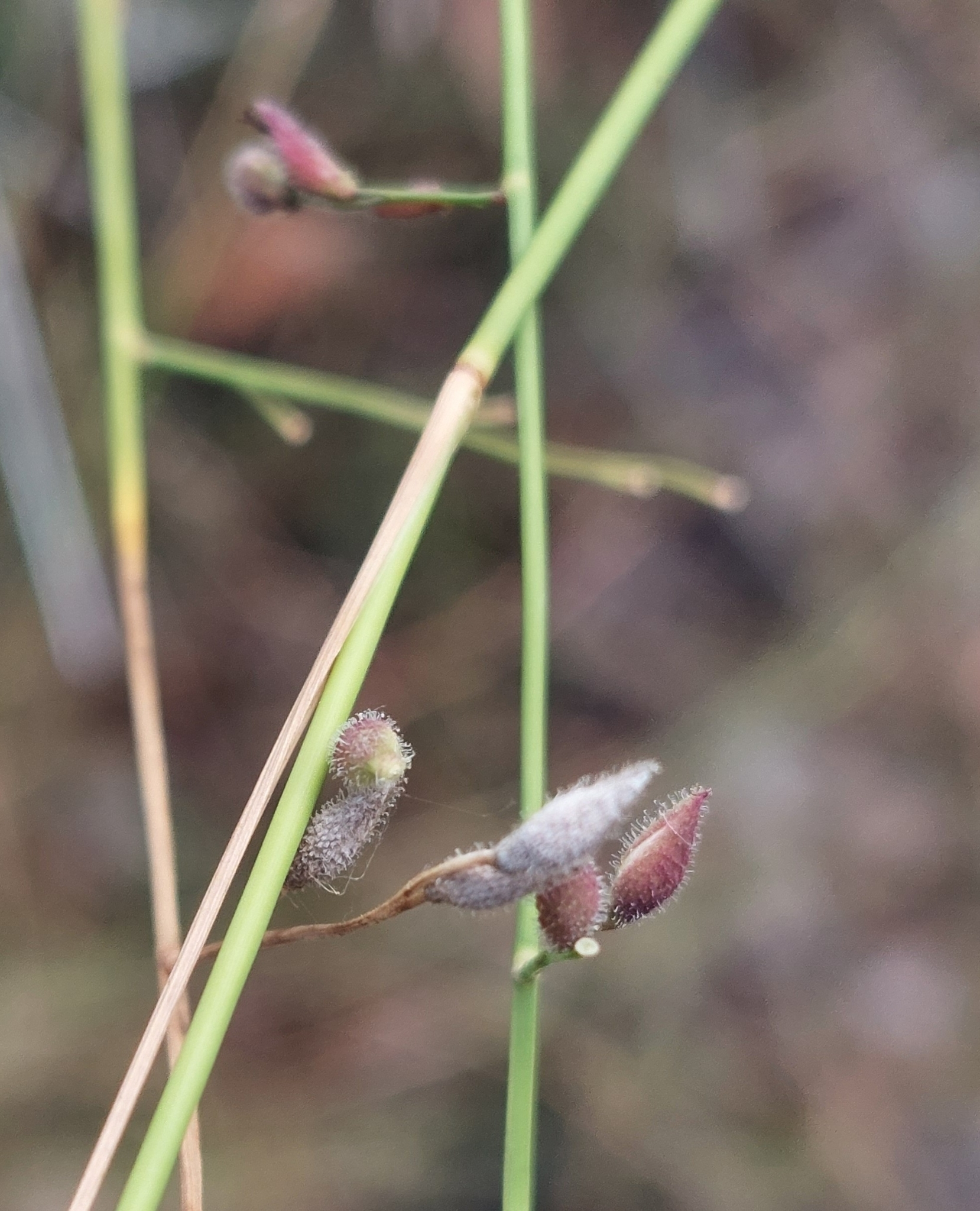
- Cleistochloa uncinulata

Scientific classification
- Kingdom: Plantae
- Clade: Tracheophytes
- Clade: Angiosperms
- Clade: Monocots
- Clade: Commelinids
- Order: Poales
- Family: Poaceae
- Subfamily: Panicoideae
- Supertribe: Panicodae
- Tribe: Paniceae
- Subtribe: Neurachninae
- Genus: Cleistochloa; C.E.Hubb.

Type species
- Cleistochloa subjuncea C.E.Hubb.

= Cleistochloa =

Genus of grasses

Cleistochloa is a genus of bunchgrasses in the family Poaceae. It includes three species native to New Guinea and eastern Australia (Queensland and New South Wales).

== Species ==
Three species are accepted.

- Cleistochloa sclerachne (F.M.Bailey) C.E.Hubb. - Queensland and New Guinea
- Cleistochloa subjuncea C.E.Hubb. - Queensland and New South Wales
- Cleistochloa uncinulata (R.Br.) Mabb. & D.T.Moore – Queensland and New South Wales; introduced to Fiji

=== Formerly placed here ===
- Dimorphochloa rigida S.T.Blake (as Cleistochloa rigida (S.T.Blake) Clayton)
