= Chamaeraphis =

Scientific classification
- Kingdom: Plantae
- Clade: Tracheophytes
- Clade: Angiosperms
- Clade: Monocots
- Clade: Commelinids
- Order: Poales
- Family: Poaceae
- Subfamily: Panicoideae
- Supertribe: Panicodae
- Tribe: Paniceae
- Subtribe: Cenchrinae
- Genus: Chamaeraphis; R.Br.
- Species: C. hordeacea

Binomial name
- Chamaeraphis hordeacea R.Br.

Synonyms
- Setosa Ewart; Panicum hordeaceum (R.Br.) Raspail; Panicum chamaeraphis Trin.; Setosa hordeacea (R.Br.) Ewart; Setosa erecta Ewart & Cookson

Genus of grasses

Chamaeraphis is a genus of Australian plants in the grass family. The only recognized species is Chamaeraphis hordeacea, found in Queensland and Northern Territory.

formerly included

Dozens of other names have been coined at the specific and varietal levels, considered at the time as members of Chamaeraphis but now regarded as better suited to other genera, including Chrysopogon, Echinochloa, Ixophorus, Panicum, Paratheria, Pennisetum, Pseudoraphis, Setaria, and Setariopsis

== See also ==
- List of Poaceae genera
