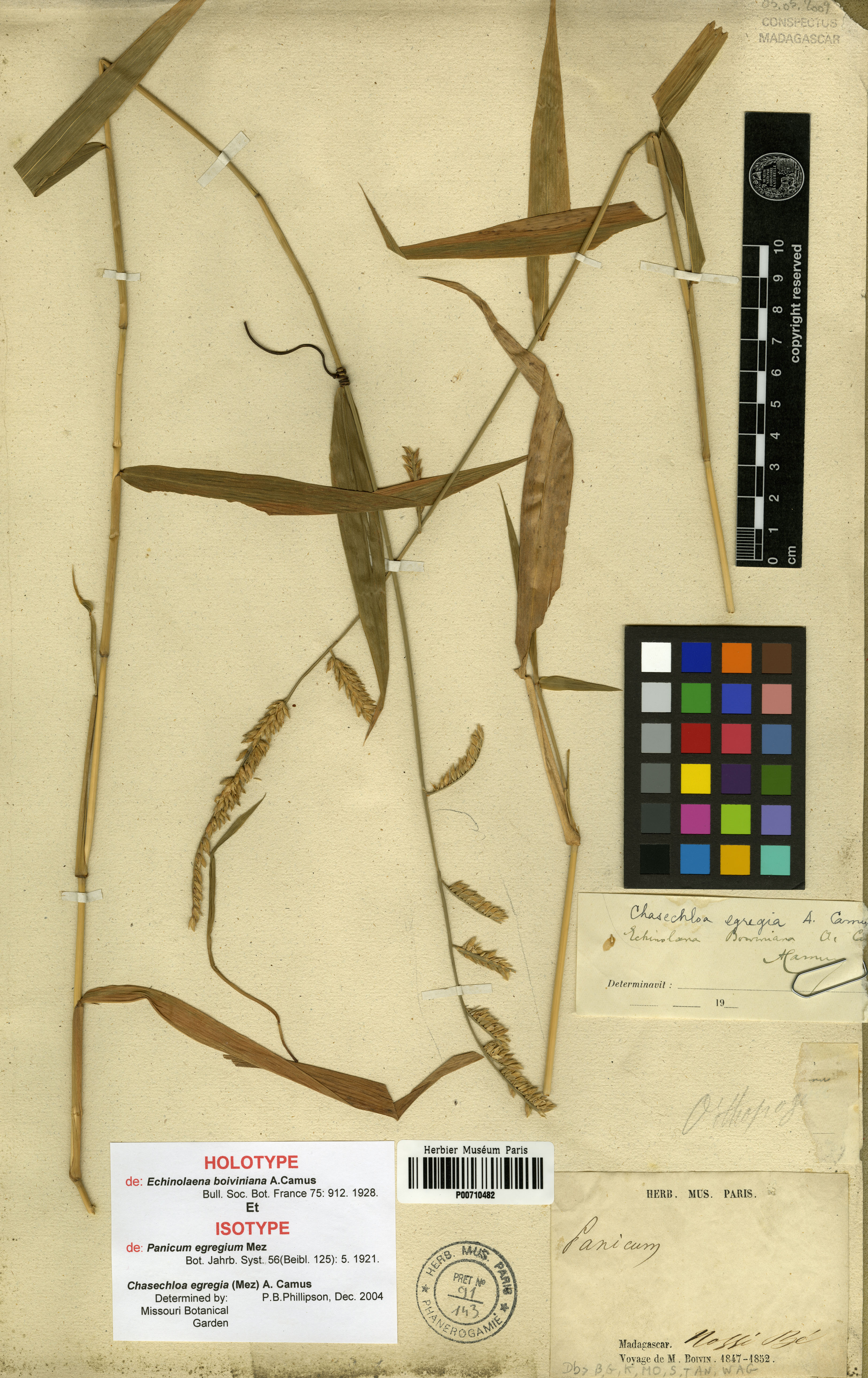
- Only known specimen of Chasechloa egregia at the MNHN

Scientific classification
- Kingdom: Plantae
- Clade: Tracheophytes
- Clade: Angiosperms
- Clade: Monocots
- Clade: Commelinids
- Order: Poales
- Family: Poaceae
- Subfamily: Panicoideae
- Supertribe: Panicodae
- Tribe: Paniceae
- Subtribe: Boivinellinae
- Genus: Chasechloa; A.Camus

Type species
- Chasechloa madagascariensis (Baker) A.Camus

= Chasechloa =

Genus of grasses

Chasechloa is a grass genus in the tribe Paniceae (subtribe Boivinellinae), endemic to Madagascar. It was described by French botanist Aimée Antoinette Camus in 1948, who named it in honour of Mary Agnes Chase. Its two species were also classified in the genera Echinolaena and Panicum, but phylogenetic analysis confirmed that they form a distinct lineage.

Species of the genus are erect grasses, 20–100 centimetres (7.9–39.4 in) tall. They have ovate to linear leaves. The inflorescence is a terminal, one-sided raceme, sometimes in clusters of up to five. The glumes have prominent stiff hairs. The spikelets are paired and have no awns. The genus can be distinguished from similar forest grass species in Acroceras, Brachiaria, Urochloa and Poecilostachys by its denser and thicker racemes.

The upper florets have oily appendages, elaiosomes, which suggest seed dispersal by ants (myrmecochory), although this has not directly been observed.

Chasechloa species are found in savanna, rocky outcrops or dry forest. They are restricted to the north-west of Madagascar.

The two species are:

- Chasechloa egregia (Baker) A. Camus (synonyms Panicum egregium, Echinolaena boiviniana – this species is probably extinct; only one specimen from Nosy Be is known)
- Chasechloa madagascariensis (Mez) A. Camus (synonym Ch. humbertiana, Echinolaena madagascariensis)
