= Chlorocalymma =

Scientific classification
- Kingdom: Plantae
- Clade: Tracheophytes
- Clade: Angiosperms
- Clade: Monocots
- Clade: Commelinids
- Order: Poales
- Family: Poaceae
- Subfamily: Panicoideae
- Supertribe: Panicodae
- Tribe: Paniceae
- Subtribe: Anthephorinae
- Genus: Chlorocalymma; Clayton
- Species: C. cryptacanthum

Binomial name
- Chlorocalymma cryptacanthum Clayton

Genus of grasses

Chlorocalymma is a genus of Tanzanian plants in the grass family. The only known species is Chlorocalymma cryptacanthum, native to the Iringa Region of central Tanzania.

The name is from the Greek words chloros (green) and kalymma (covering).

== See also ==
- List of Poaceae genera
