= Acritochaete =

Scientific classification
- Kingdom: Plantae
- Clade: Tracheophytes
- Clade: Angiosperms
- Clade: Monocots
- Clade: Commelinids
- Order: Poales
- Family: Poaceae
- Subfamily: Panicoideae
- Supertribe: Panicodae
- Tribe: Paniceae
- Subtribe: Cenchrinae
- Genus: Acritochaete; Pilg.
- Species: A. volkensii

Binomial name
- Acritochaete volkensii Pilg.

Synonyms
- Oplismenus volkensii (Pilg.) Mez ex Peter

Genus of grasses

Acritochaete is a genus of African plants in the grass family.

The only known species is Acritochaete volkensii, native to Nigeria, Cameroon, islands of the Gulf of Guinea, Zaïre, Burundi, Uganda, Kenya, Tanzania, Ethiopia, and South Sudan.

== See also ==
- List of Poaceae genera
