= William Derek Clayton =

English botanist (1926–1923)

William Derek Clayton (24 July 1926 – 8 September 2023), commonly known as Derek Clayton, was a British botanist who worked at the Royal Botanic Gardens, Kew, on grasses (Poaceae).

== Early life ==
William Derek Clayton was born in Croydon, Surrey on 24 July 1926. He went to Eastbourne College where he attained the Higher School Certificate in Physics and Double Maths. He went on to read Mechanical Sciences at Magdalene College, Cambridge, Magdalene, but left after a year. He was commissioned as a 2nd Lieutenant when called up for National Service and posted to 110 Army Troops Squadron in Austria. He later studied botany at Norwood College for a year and started his interest in the identification of grasses. At Imperial College London, he obtained a first class degree in botany. He then was awarded a Colonial Ecological Scholarship which took him a year to Lincoln College, Oxford, followed by another year at the East African Research and Forestry Organisation; he visited Kenya, Uganda and Malawi. This was followed by four years working as an ecologist at the Federal Agricultural Research Station at Ibadan, Nigeria.

== Career ==
Clayton joined the scientific staff working in the Herbarium at Kew where he worked on the grasses of tropical Africa. He was awarded his Ph.D. for his study of Hyparrhenia published in 1969. He went on to be a Principal Scientific Officer, head of Gramineae and Assistant Keeper. He was also interested in chorology and using numerical methods in plant taxonomy.

Clayton was awarded Associateship of Imperial College London (A.R.C.S.) and was a member of the Linnean Society of London.

Officially retired in 1989, he continued to work in the Herbarium as an Honorary Research Fellow. After retirement he worked on the World Grass Species Database and the Grass Synonyms Database; these were amalgamated as GrassBase in 2006. He continued to work on the database up to 2017 and was awarded the Kew Medal in 2006.

== Eponymy ==
Adenochloa claytonii (Renvoize) Zuloaga, Festuca claytonii E.B.Alexeev, Hyparrhenia claytonii S.M.Phillips and Triodia claytonii Lazarides.

== Personal life and death ==
Derek Clayton married Lucille Hicks in 1953 at Hampstead; they had a son and two daughters. He died on 8 September 2023, at the age of 97.

== Selected publications ==
- Studies in the Gramineae: XXVI. Numerical taxonomy of the Arundinelleae. Clayton, W. D. (1971). Kew Bulletin 26 (1) 111-123
- The Chorology of Old World Species of Gramineae. Clayton, W. D., & Cope, T. A. (1980). Kew Bulletin, 35(1), 135–171. https://doi.org/10.2307/4117012
- Geographical distribution of present-day Poaceae as evidence for the origin of African floras. W.D. Clayton (1983). Bothalia 14 (3 & 4): 421–425.
- The Genus Concept in Practice. W. D. Clayton (1983). Kew Bulletin 38 (2) 149–153.
- Genera Graminum. Grasses of the World. W. D. Clayton and S. A. Renvoize. (1986). Her Majesty's Stationery Office, ISBN 0-11-250006-4
- Flora of Tropical East Africa: Gramineae (Part 1) W. D. Clayton. (2000). Kew Publishing. 9781842462652

Data related to William Derek Clayton at Wikispecies
