= Moorochloa =

Scientific classification
- Kingdom: Plantae
- Clade: Tracheophytes
- Clade: Angiosperms
- Clade: Monocots
- Clade: Commelinids
- Order: Poales
- Family: Poaceae
- Subfamily: Panicoideae
- Supertribe: Panicodae
- Tribe: Paniceae
- Subtribe: Melinidinae
- Genus: Moorochloa; Veldkamp

Genus of grasses

Moorochloa is a genus of grasses. It includes three species native to the Mediterranean basin, western, central, southern, and southeast Asia, the Arabian Peninsula, Madagascar, and northeastern, eastern, and Southern Africa.

- Moorochloa eruciformis (Sm.) Veldkamp
- Moorochloa malacodes (Mez & K.Schum.) Veldkamp
- Moorochloa schoenfelderi (C.E.Hubb. & Schweick.) Veldkamp
