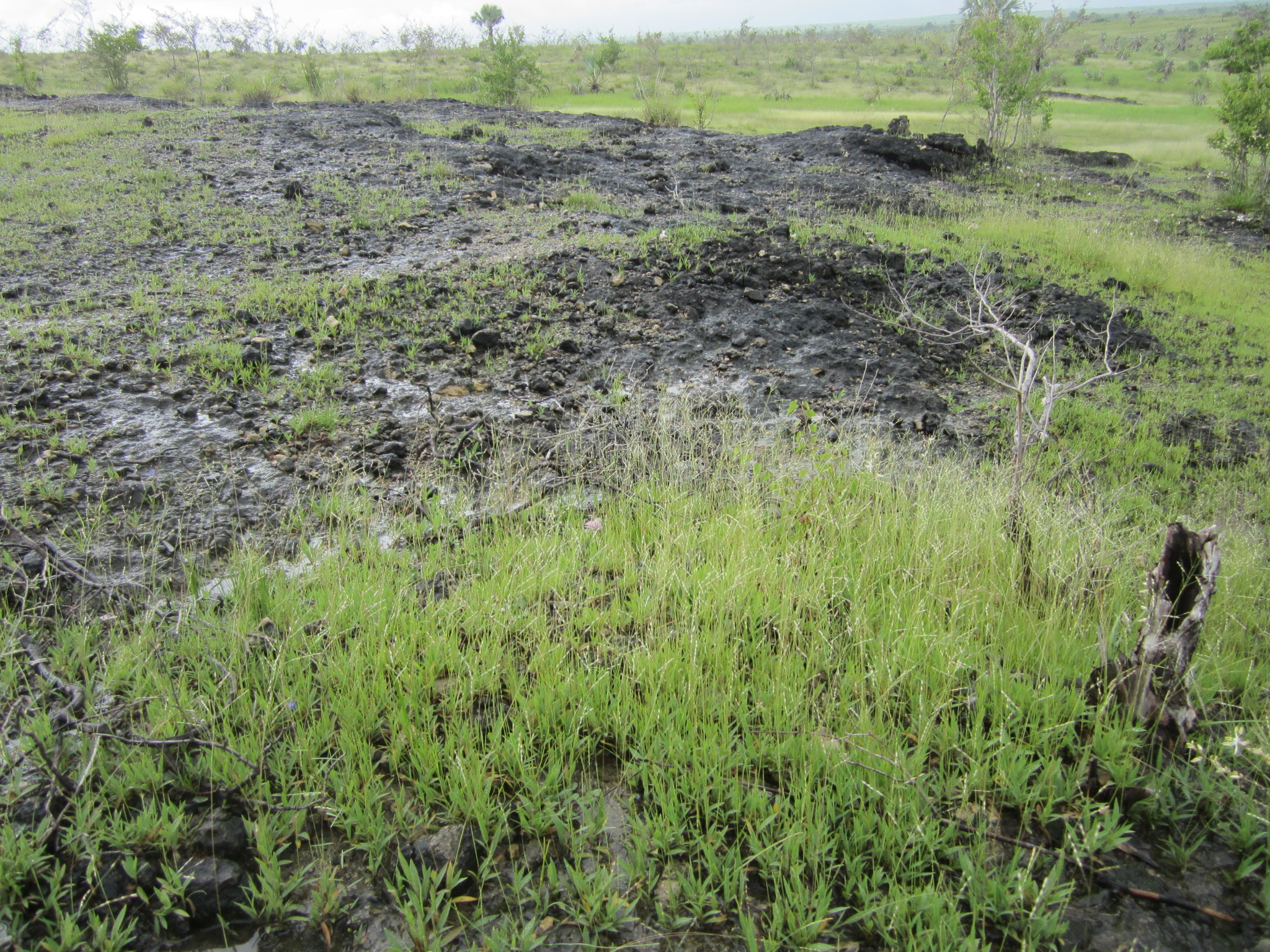
- Yvesia madagascariensis

Scientific classification
- Kingdom: Plantae
- Clade: Tracheophytes
- Clade: Angiosperms
- Clade: Monocots
- Clade: Commelinids
- Order: Poales
- Family: Poaceae
- Subfamily: Panicoideae
- Supertribe: Panicodae
- Tribe: Paniceae
- Subtribe: Melinidinae
- Genus: Yvesia; A.Camus
- Species: Y. madagascariensis

Binomial name
- Yvesia madagascariensis A.Camus

= Yvesia =

Genus of grasses

Yvesia is a genus of plants in the grass family. The only known species is Yvesia madagascariensis, found only in Madagascar.
