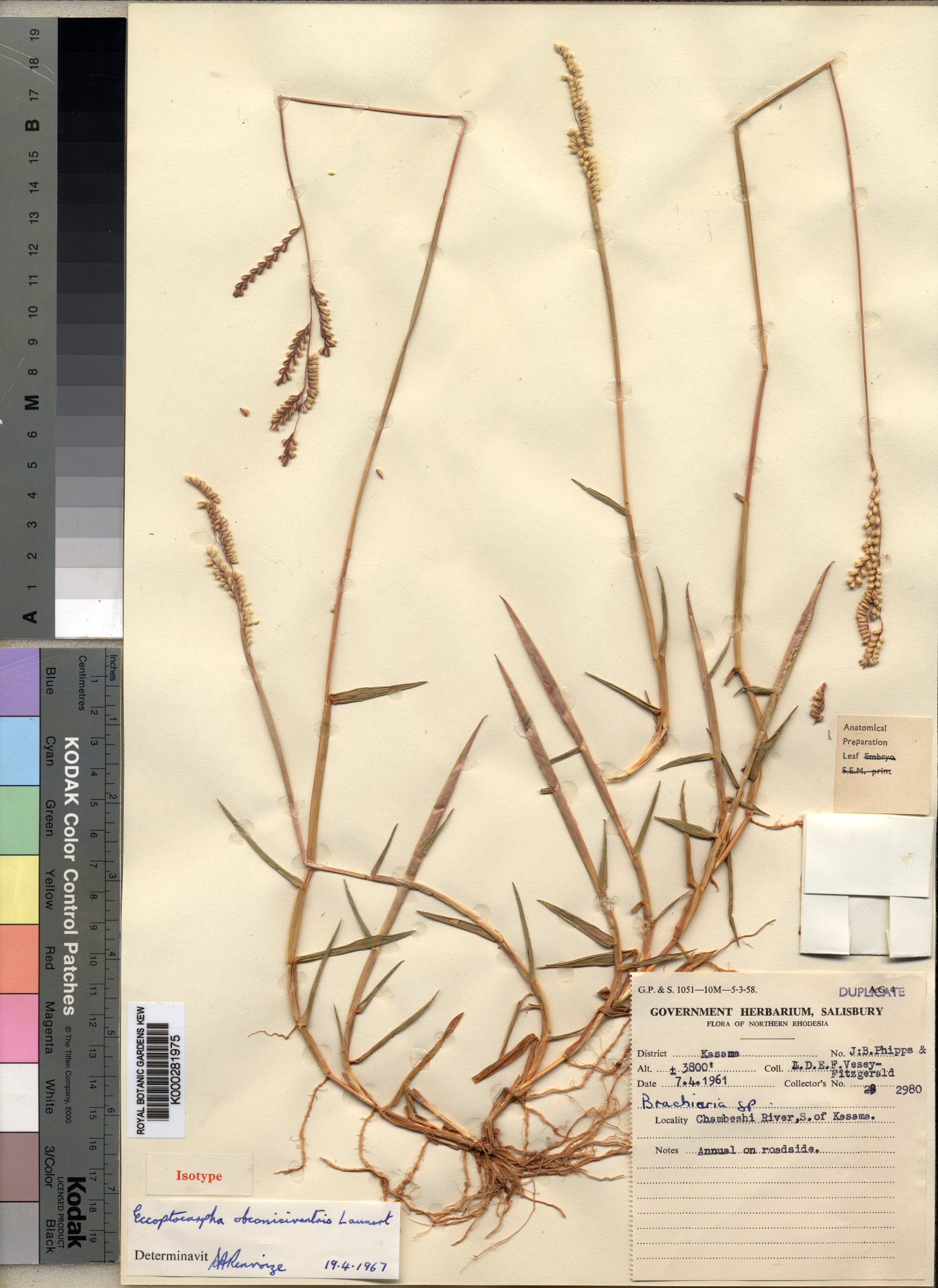

Scientific classification
- Kingdom: Plantae
- Clade: Tracheophytes
- Clade: Angiosperms
- Clade: Monocots
- Clade: Commelinids
- Order: Poales
- Family: Poaceae
- Subfamily: Panicoideae
- Supertribe: Panicodae
- Tribe: Paniceae
- Subtribe: Melinidinae
- Genus: Eccoptocarpha; Launert
- Species: E. obconiciventris

Binomial name
- Eccoptocarpha obconiciventris Launert

= Eccoptocarpha =

Genus of grasses

Eccoptocarpha is a genus of African plants in the grass family. The only known species is Eccoptocarpha obconiciventris, native to Tanzania and northern Zambia.
