= Streptolophus =

Scientific classification
- Kingdom: Plantae
- Clade: Tracheophytes
- Clade: Angiosperms
- Clade: Monocots
- Clade: Commelinids
- Order: Poales
- Family: Poaceae
- Subfamily: Panicoideae
- Supertribe: Panicodae
- Tribe: Paniceae
- Subtribe: Cenchrinae
- Genus: Streptolophus; Hughes
- Species: S. sagittifolius

Binomial name
- Streptolophus sagittifolius Hughes

Genus of grasses

Streptolophus is a genus of plants in the grass family. The only known species is Streptolophus sagittifolius, found only in Angola.
