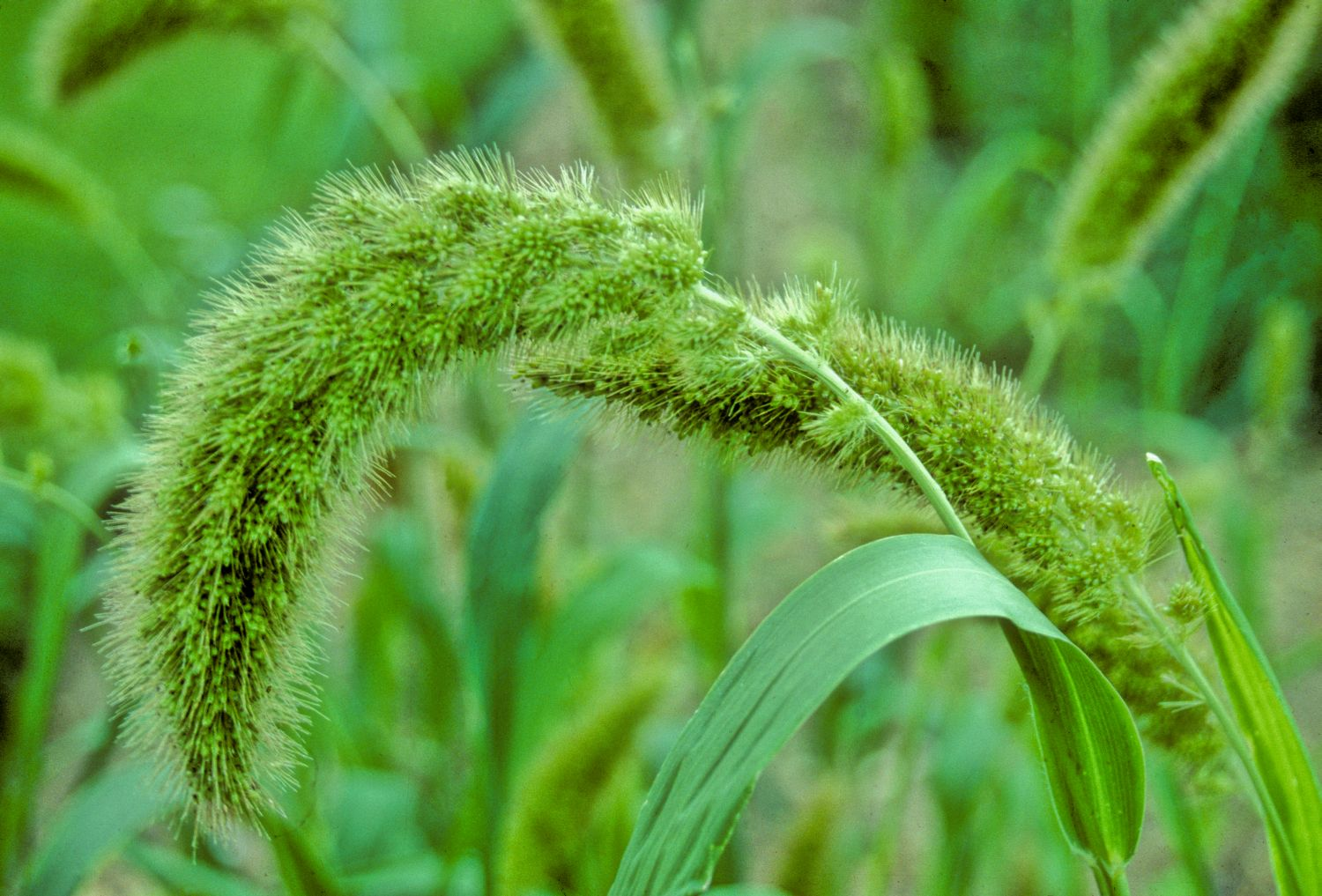
- Foxtail millet (Setaria italica)

Scientific classification
- Kingdom: Plantae
- Clade: Tracheophytes
- Clade: Angiosperms
- Clade: Monocots
- Clade: Commelinids
- Order: Poales
- Family: Poaceae
- Clade: PACMAD clade
- Subfamily: Panicoideae
- Supertribe: Panicodae; L.Liu (1980)
- Tribe: Paniceae; R.Br. (1814)

Genera
- 84, see text

Synonyms
- Cenchreae Rchb. (1828, unranked); Digitarieae J.J.Schmitz & Regel (1841); Paniceae Horan. (1847, as Panicinae); Spinificeae Dumort. (1829); Melinideae Hitchc. (1920); Boivinelleae A. Camus (1925); Anthephoreae Pilg. ex Potztal (1957); Trachideae Pilg. ex Potztal (1957); Cyphochlaeneae Bosser (1965); Neurachneae S.T. Blake (1972)

= Paniceae =

Tribe of grasses

Paniceae is a large tribe of the subfamily Panicoideae in the grasses (Poaceae), the only in the monotypic supertribe Panicodae. It includes roughly 1,500 species in 84 genera, primarily found in tropical and subtropical regions of the world. Paniceae includes species using either of the C_{4} and C_{3} photosynthetic pathways, as well as presumably intermediate species. Most of the millets are members of tribe Paniceae.

The tribe is subdivided into seven subtribes, but some genera are as yet unplaced (incertae sedis). Species in the Paniceae have an ancestral chromosome number (monoploid number) of x = 9, while species with x = 10 formerly included are now recognised as separate tribe, Paspaleae.

== Subtribes and genera ==
Subdivisions:

incertae sedis

- Homopholis
- Hydrothauma
- Hylebates
- Kellochloa
- Oryzidium
- Pseudolasiacis
- Sacciolepis
- Thedachloa
- Trichanthecium
- Walwhalleya

Anthephorinae

- Anthephora
- Chaetopoa
- Chlorocalymma
- Digitaria (synonym Megaloprotachne)
- Taeniorhachis
- Tarigidia
- Thyridachne
- Trachys

Boivinellinae

- Acroceras (synonym Setiacis)
- Alloteropsis
- Amphicarpum
- Chasechloa
- Cyphochlaena
- Cyrtococcum
- Echinochloa
- Entolasia
- Lasiacis
- Mayariochloa
- Microcalamus
- Morronea
- Oplismenus
- Ottochloa
- Parodiophyllochloa
- Poecilostachys (synonym Chloachne)
- Pseudechinolaena

Cenchrinae

- Acritochaete
- Alexfloydia
- Cenchrus (synonyms Cenchropsis, Echinaria, Kikuyuochloa, Nastus, Odontelytrum, Pennisetum, and Pseudochaetochloa)
- Chamaeraphis
- Dissochondrus
- Holcolemma
- Hygrochloa
- Ixophorus
- Janochloa
- Paractaenum
- Paratheria
- Plagiosetum
- Pseudoraphis
- Setaria (synonyms Camusiella and Paspalidium)
- Setariopsis
- Snowdenia
- Spinifex
- Stenotaphrum
- Stereochlaena
- Streptolophus
- Uranthoecium
- Whiteochloa
- Xerochloa
- Zuloagaea
- Zygochloa

Cleistochloinae

- Calyptochloa C.E.Hubb.
- Cleistochloa C.E.Hubb.
- Cryptachne E.J.Thomps.
- Dimorphochloa S.T.Blake
- Simonachne E.J.Thomps.

Dichantheliinae

- Adenochloa
- Dichanthelium

Melinidinae

- Batochloa
- Chaetium
- Eccoptocarpha
- Eriochloa
- Megathyrsus
- Melinis (synonyms Mildbraediochloa and Rhynchelytrum)
- Moorochloa
- Rupichloa
- Scutachne
- Thuarea
- Tricholaena
- Urochloa (synonyms Brachiaria, Leucophrys, and Pseudobrachiaria)
- Yvesia

Neurachninae

- Ancistrachne
- Neurachne
- Paraneurachne
- Thyridolepis

Panicinae

- Cnidochloa
- Louisiella
- Panicum (synonyms Arthragrostis and Yakirra)

== Gallery ==
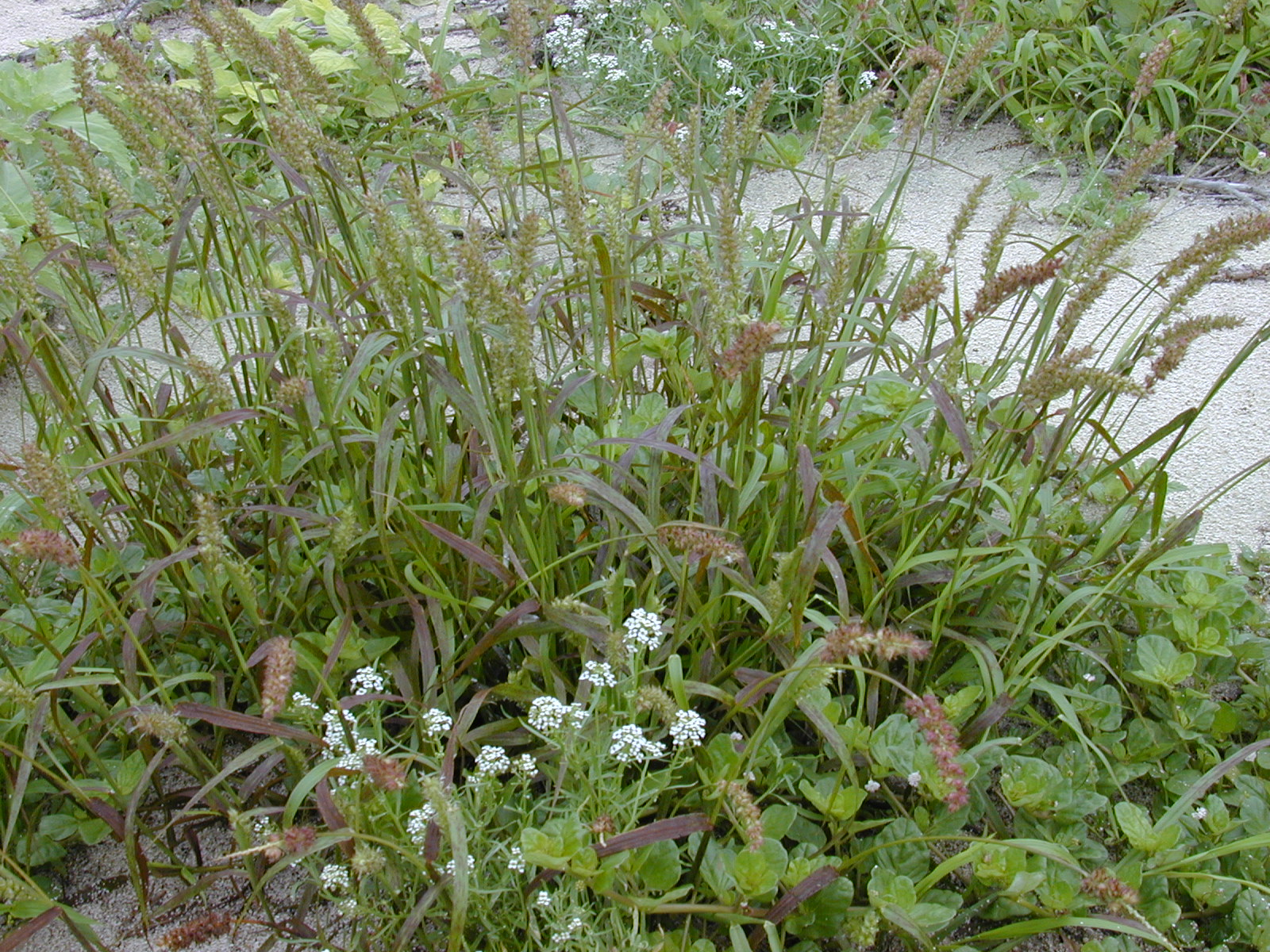
Cenchrus echinatus

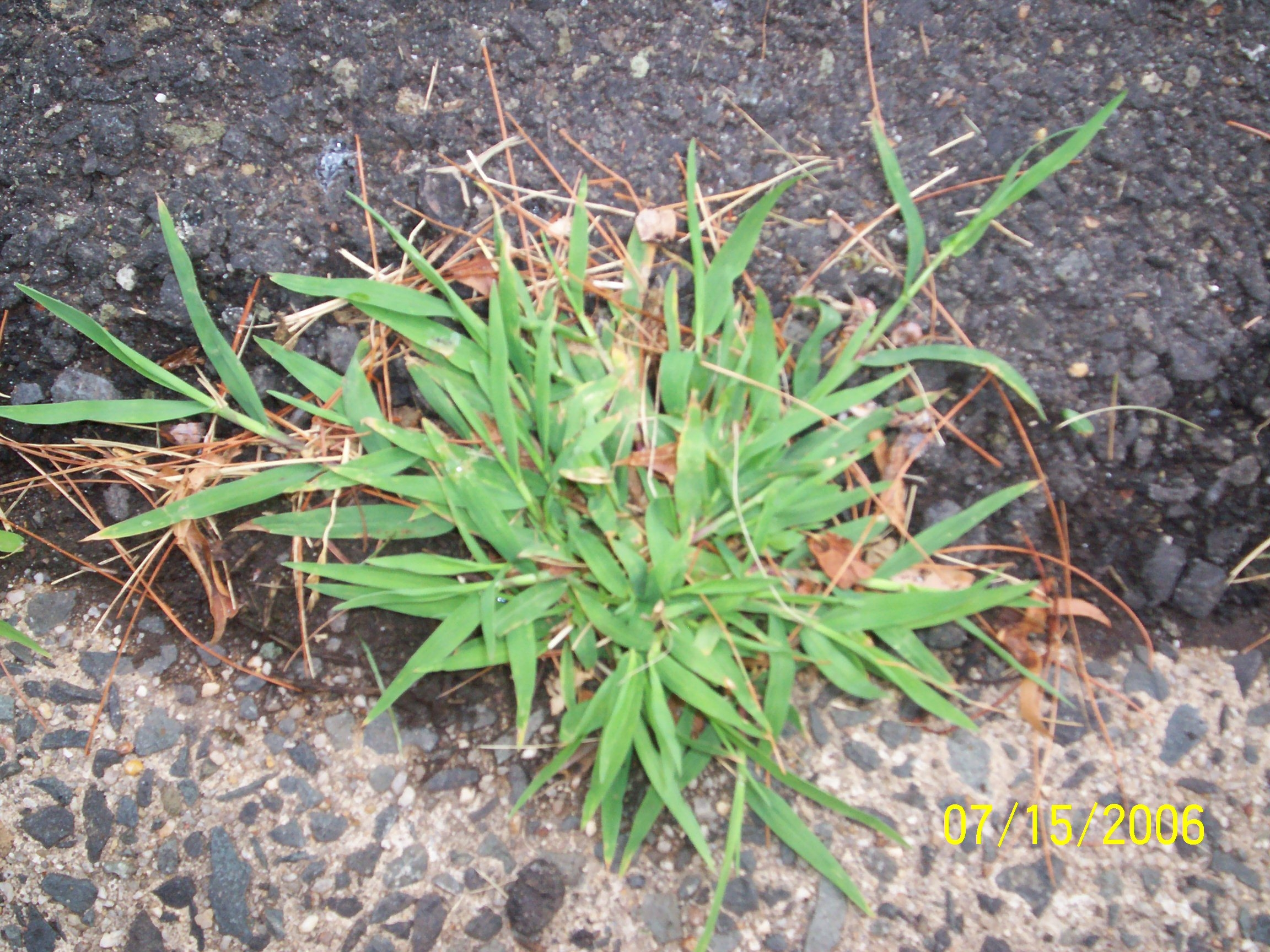
Digitaria sanguinalis

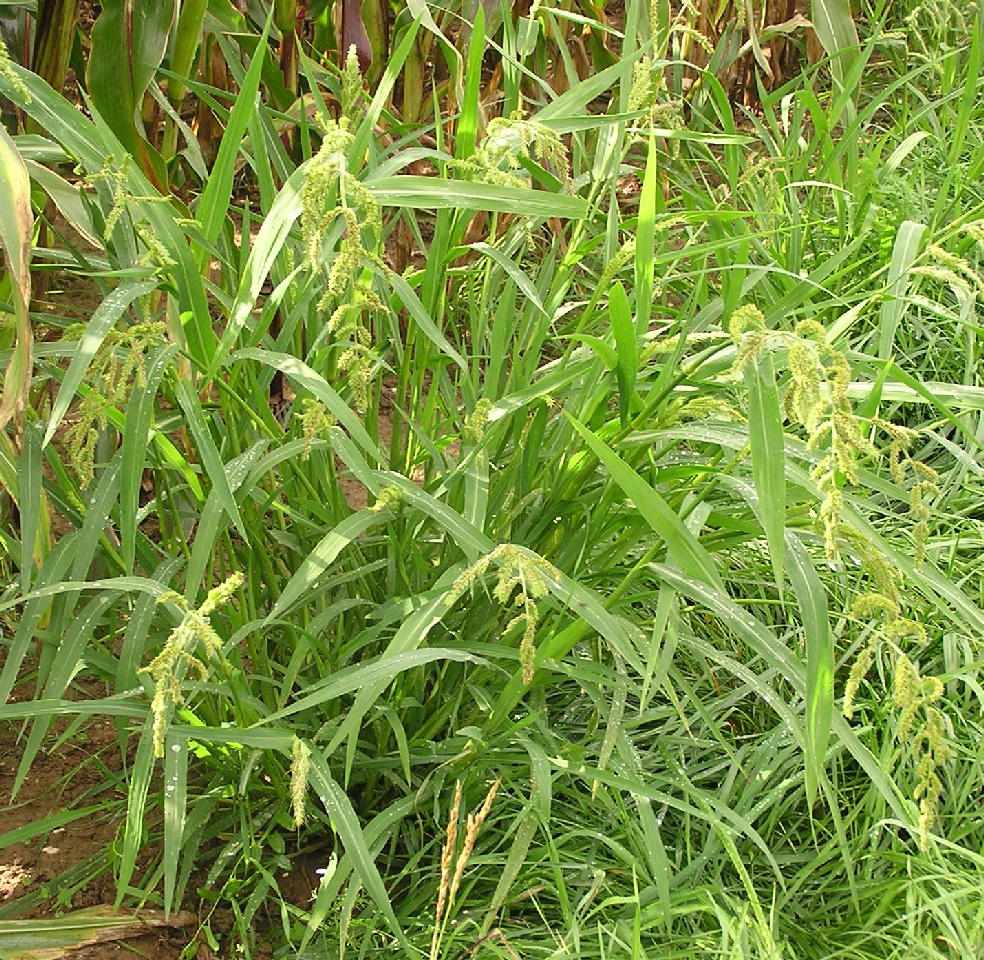
Echinochloa crus-galli

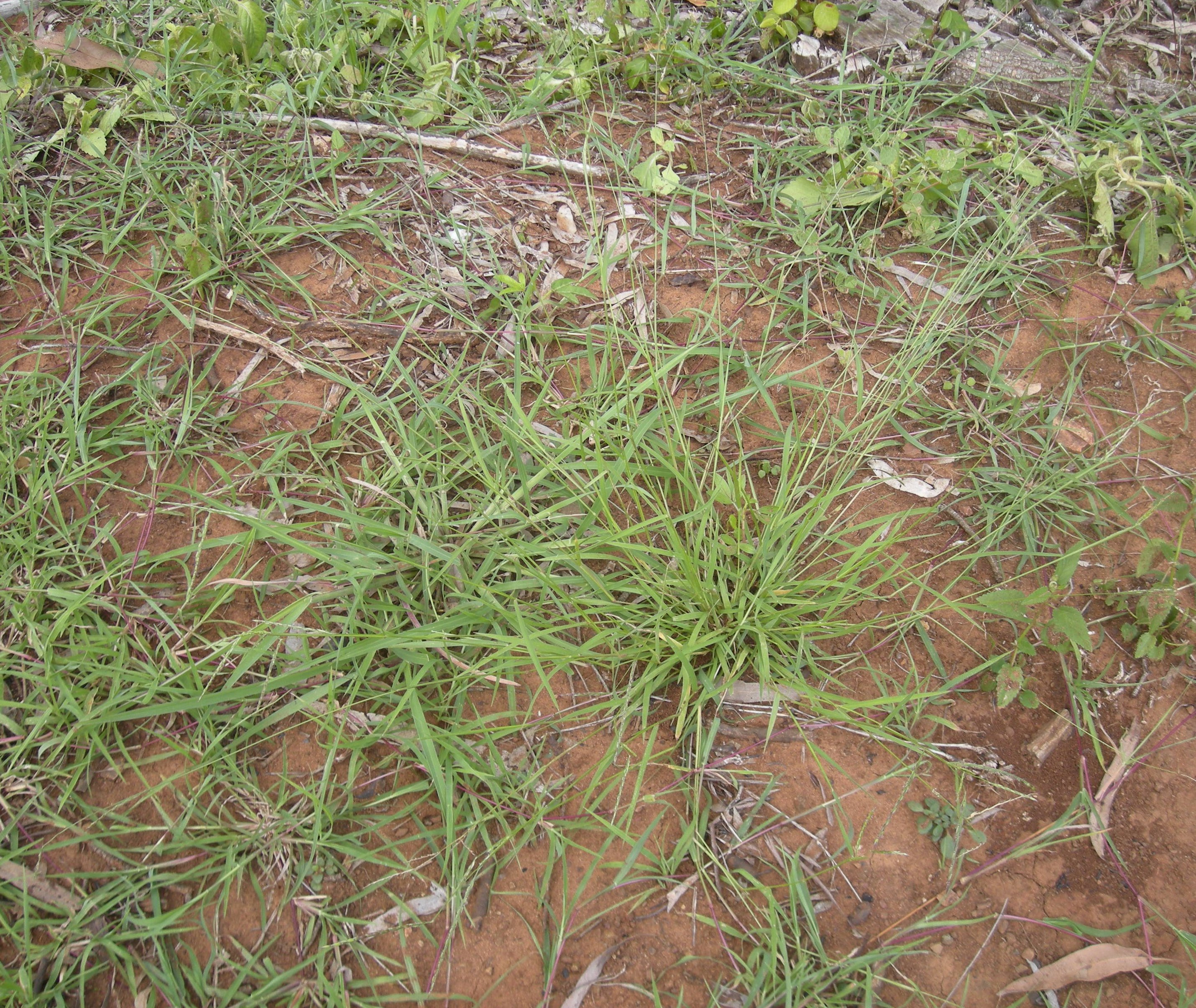
Eriochloa procera

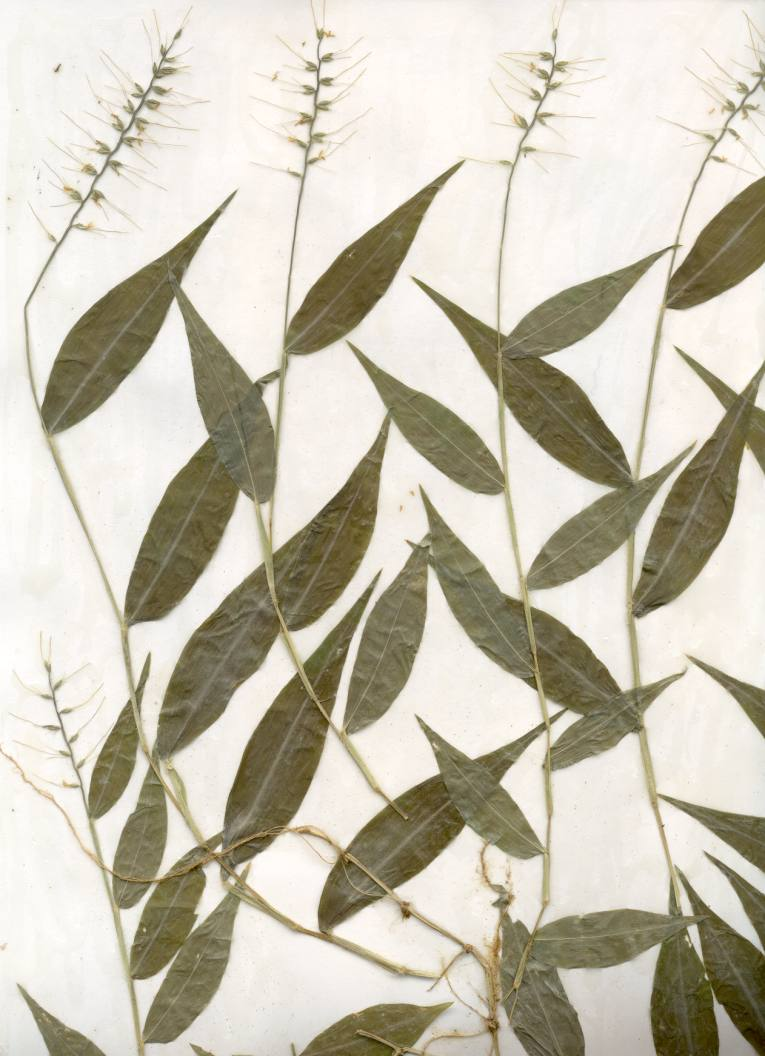
Oplismenus hirtellus undulatifolius

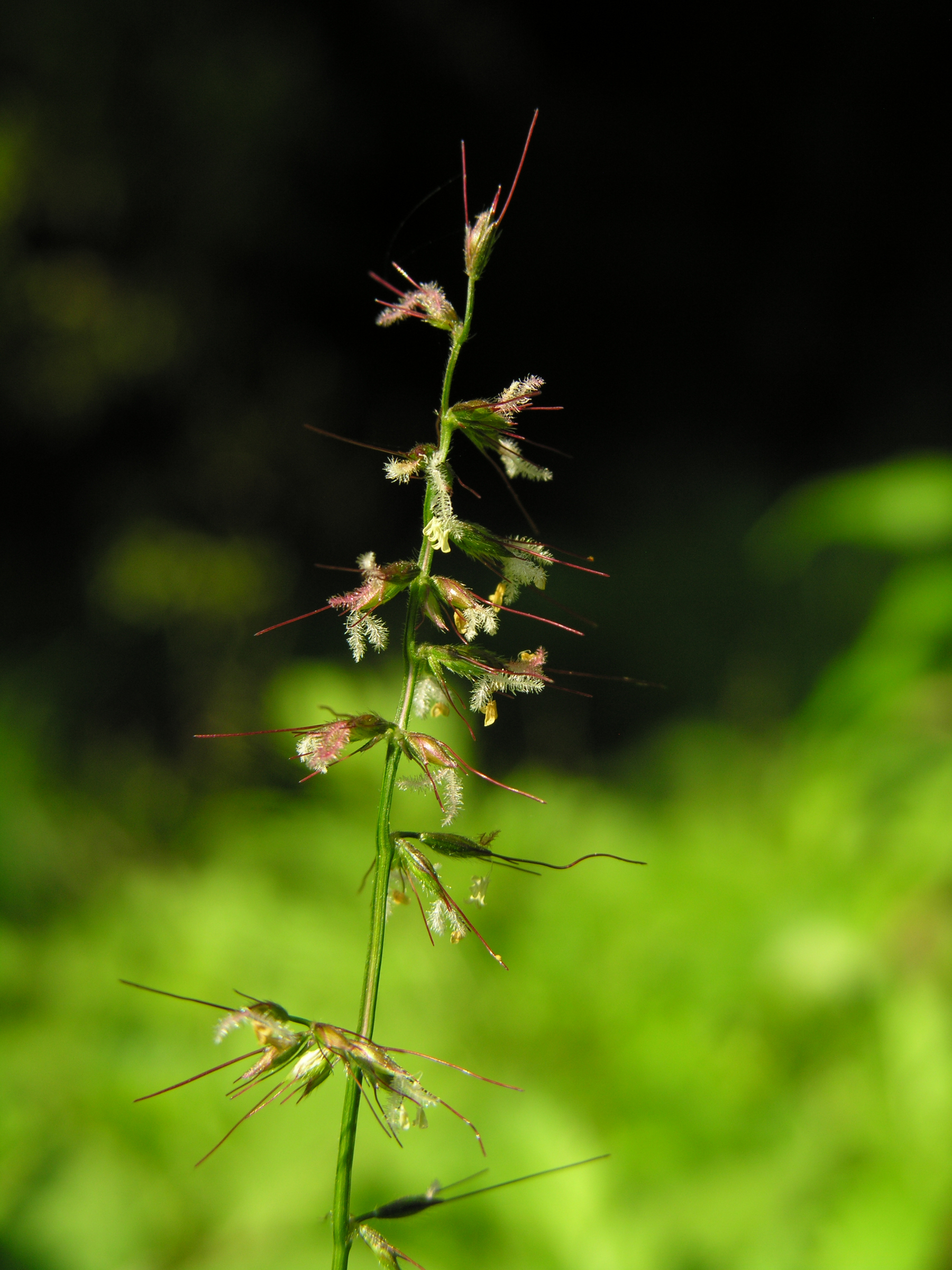
Oplismenus undulatifolius

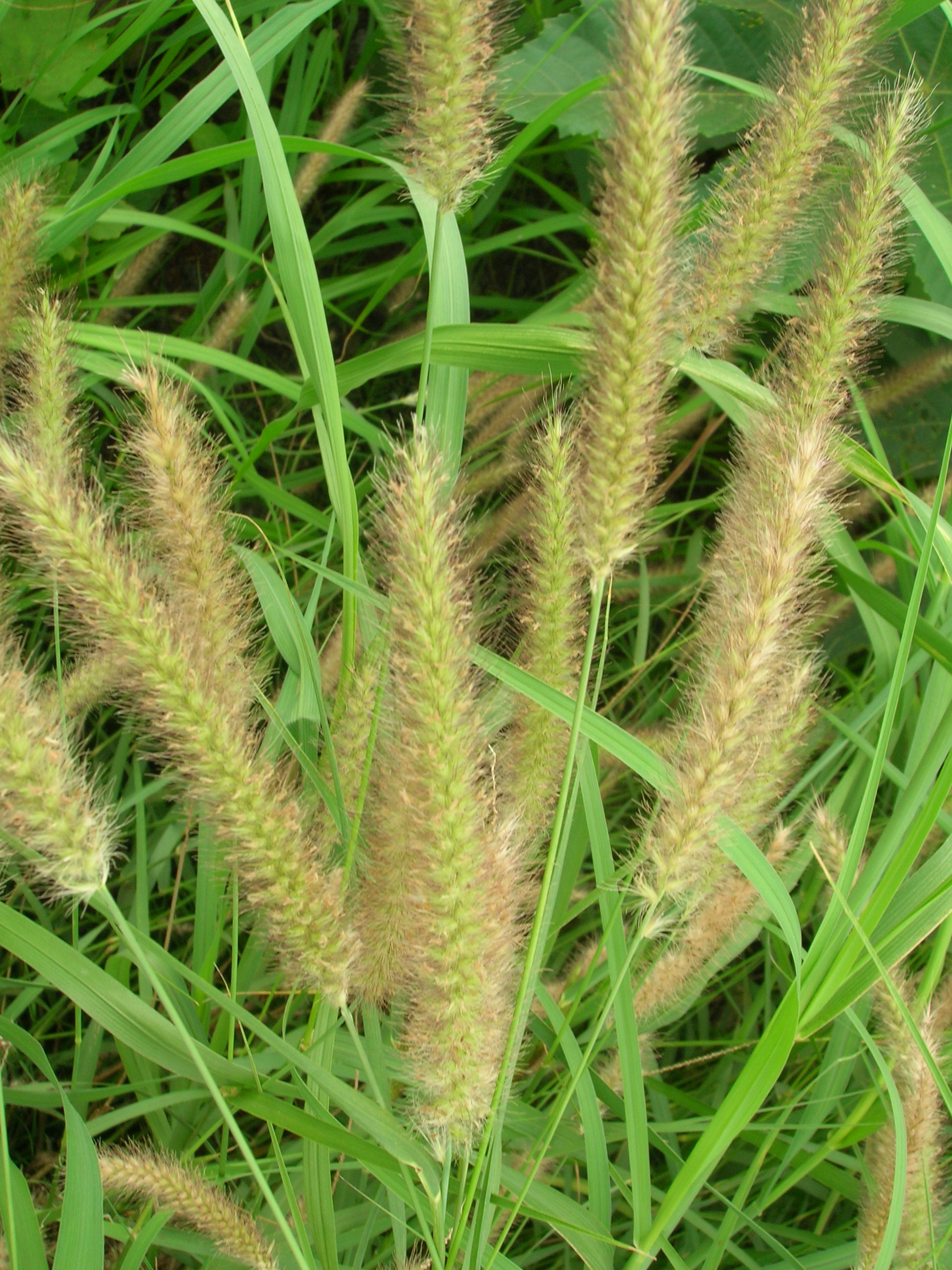
Pennisetum polystachion

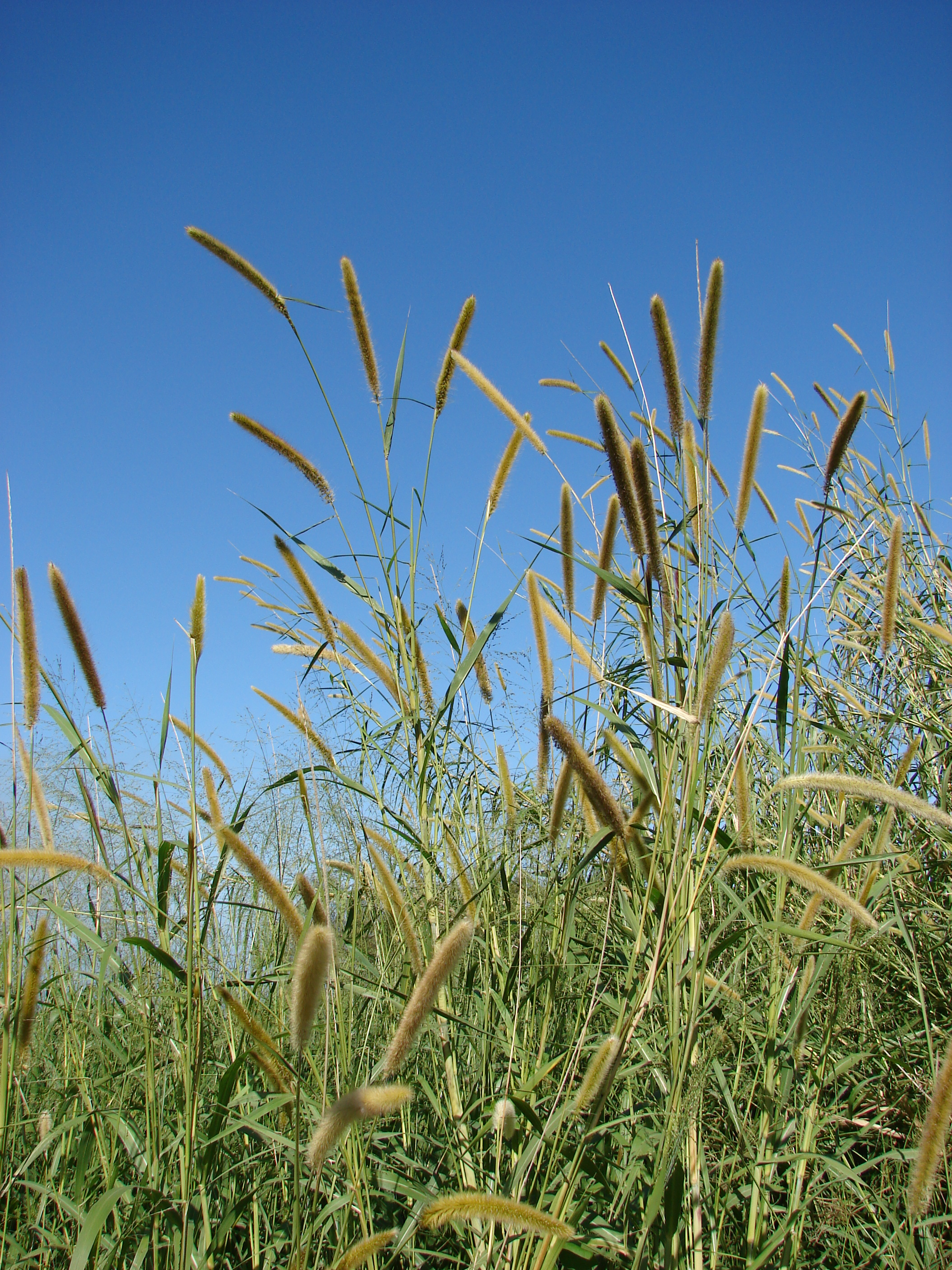
Pennisetum purpureum

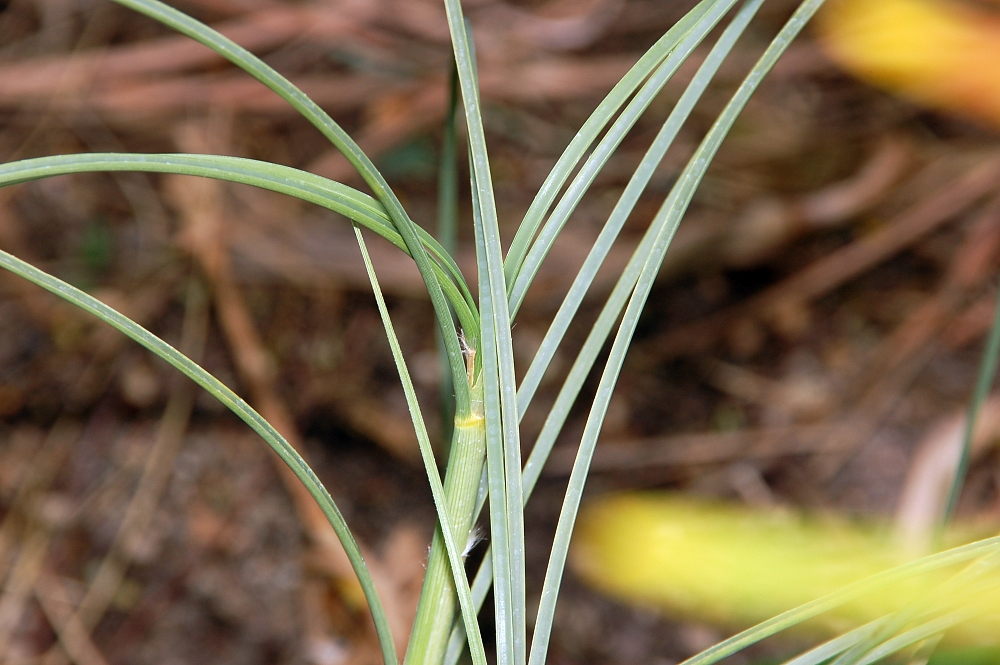
Spinifex longifolius

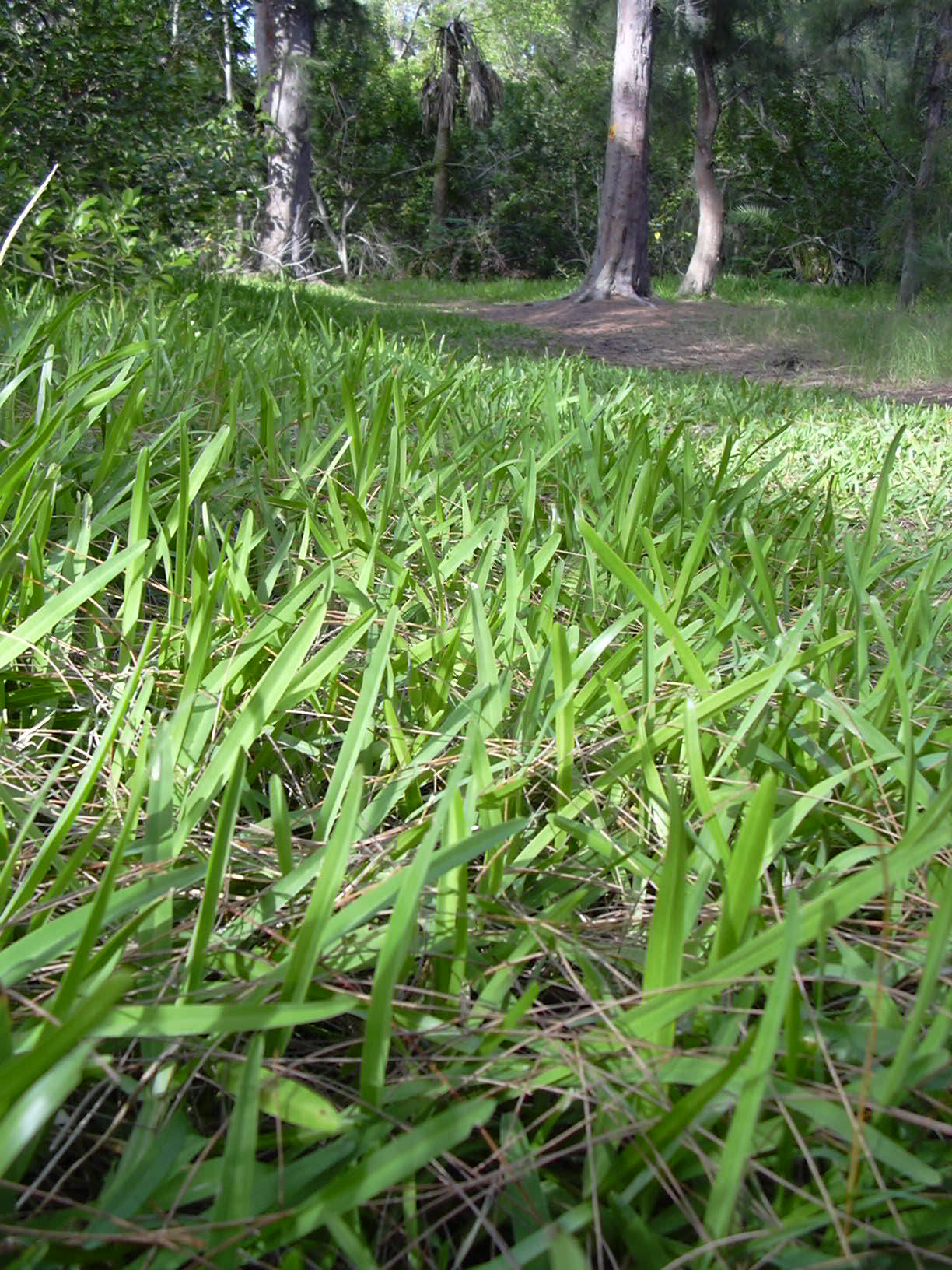
Stenotaphrum secundatum (St. Augustine Grass)

== Sources ==
- Barkworth, M. (2003). "Paniceae". Flora North America. 25: 353–602.
- Brown, Robert (1814). "Appendix III: General Remarks, Geographical and Systematical, on the Botany of Terra Australis". A Voyage to Terra Australis: Undertaken for the Purpose of Completing the Discovery of that Vast Country, and Prosecuted in the Years 1801, 1802, and 1803, in His Majesty's Ship the Investigator. By Flinders, Matthew. Vol. 2. London: G. Nicol & Son. pp. 533–612. Wikidata Q133863530.

== General references ==
- "Paniceae". Tropicos.org. 2013.
- "USDA: GRIN Taxonomy for Plants". ars-grin.gov. 23 March 2006.
