= Microcalamus =

Scientific classification
- Kingdom: Plantae
- Clade: Tracheophytes
- Clade: Angiosperms
- Clade: Monocots
- Clade: Commelinids
- Order: Poales
- Family: Poaceae
- Subfamily: Panicoideae
- Supertribe: Panicodae
- Tribe: Paniceae
- Subtribe: Boivinellinae
- Genus: Microcalamus; Franch. 1889 not Gamble 1890 (syn of Neomicrocalamus)
- Species: M. barbinodis

Binomial name
- Microcalamus barbinodis Franch.

Synonyms
- Microcalamus aspidistrula Stapf; Microcalamus convallarioides Stapf; Microcalamus aspidistrula f. angustus Stapf; Microcalamus aspidistrula f. latus Stapf; Microcalamus devosii Vanderyst; Microcalamus glaber Stapf

Genus of grasses

Microcalamus is a genus of African plants in the grass family. The only known species is Microcalamus barbinodis, native to central Africa (Cameroon, Gabon, Republic of Congo, Central African Republic).
