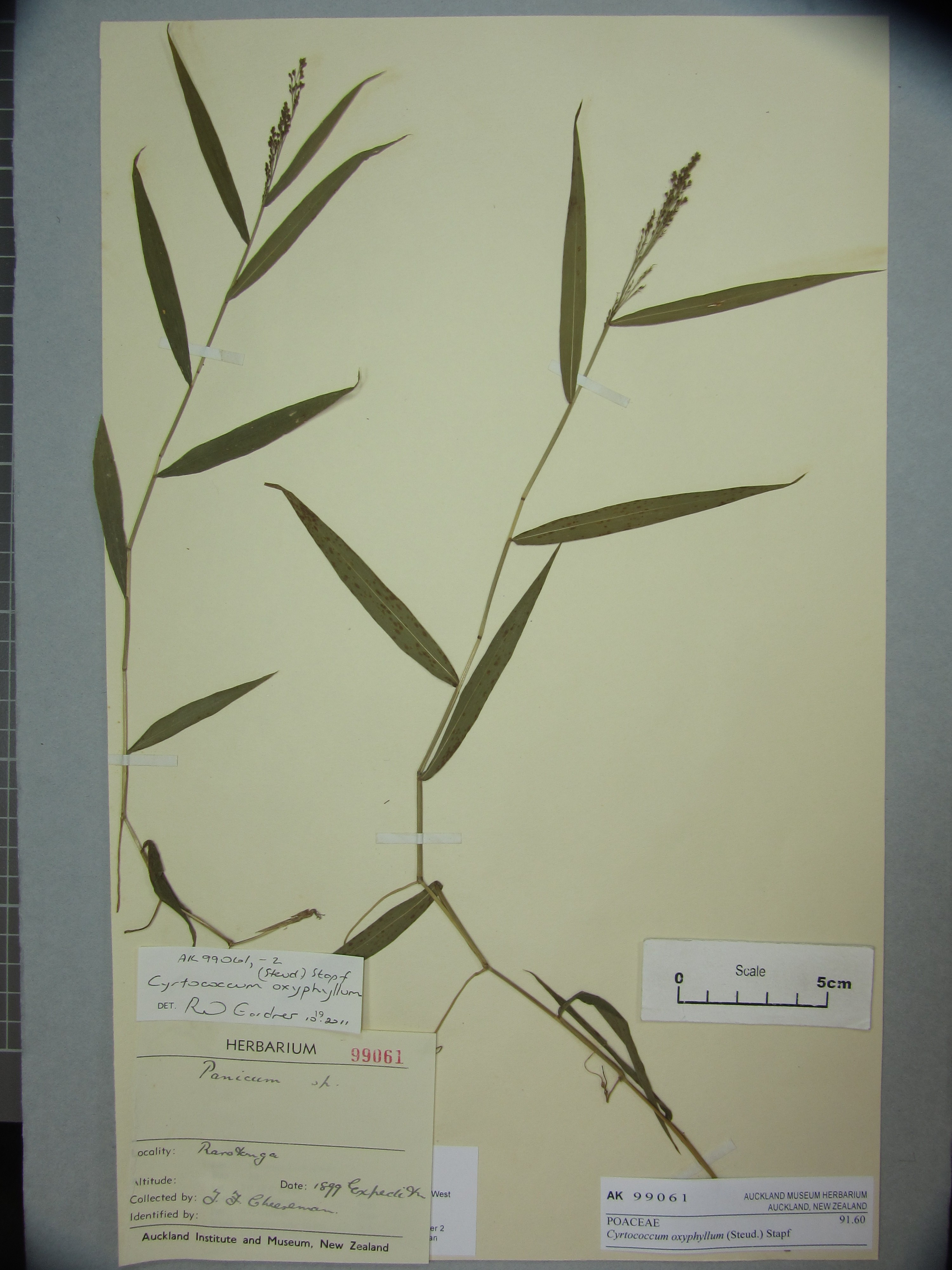
- Cyrtococcum oxyphyllum

Scientific classification
- Kingdom: Plantae
- Clade: Tracheophytes
- Clade: Angiosperms
- Clade: Monocots
- Clade: Commelinids
- Order: Poales
- Family: Poaceae
- Subfamily: Panicoideae
- Supertribe: Panicodae
- Tribe: Paniceae
- Subtribe: Boivinellinae
- Genus: Cyrtococcum; Stapf

Type species
- Cyrtococcum setigerum (syn of C. chaetophoron) (P.Beauv.) Stapf

= Cyrtococcum =

Genus of grasses

Cyrtococcum is a genus of Asian, African, and Pacific Island plants in the grass family.

Species

- Cyrtococcum bosseri A.Camus - Madagascar
- Cyrtococcum capitis-york B.K.Simon - Queensland
- Cyrtococcum chaetophoron (Roem. & Schult.) Dandy - tropical Africa
- Cyrtococcum deccanense Bor - India, Sri Lanka
- Cyrtococcum deltoideum (Hack.) A.Camus - Madagascar
- Cyrtococcum fuscinode (Steud.) A.Camus - Comoros
- Cyrtococcum humbertianum A.Camus - Madagascar
- Cyrtococcum longipes (Hook.f.) A.Camus - India, Myanmar to Andaman Islands
- Cyrtococcum multinode (Lam.) Clayton - Tanzania, Uganda, Madagascar, Comoros, Mauritius, Réunion
- Cyrtococcum nossibeense A.Camus - Madagascar
- Cyrtococcum oxyphyllum (Steud.) Stapf - China, Indian Subcontinent, Southeast Asia, Papuasia, Queensland, several Pacific Island groups
- Cyrtococcum patens (L.) A.Camus - China, Indian Subcontinent, Southeast Asia, Papuasia, Queensland, several Pacific Island groups
- Cyrtococcum tamatavense A.Camus - Madagascar
- Cyrtococcum trigonum (Retz.) A.Camus - Kenya, Tanzania, Indian Subcontinent, Southeast Asia, New Guinea, several Pacific Island groups

formerly included

see Panicum

- Cyrtococcum sparsicomum - Panicum sparsicomum
