= Hydrothauma =

Scientific classification
- Kingdom: Plantae
- Clade: Tracheophytes
- Clade: Angiosperms
- Clade: Monocots
- Clade: Commelinids
- Order: Poales
- Family: Poaceae
- Subfamily: Panicoideae
- Supertribe: Panicodae
- Tribe: Paniceae
- Genus: Hydrothauma; C.E.Hubb.
- Species: H. manicatum

Binomial name
- Hydrothauma manicatum C.E.Hubb.

Genus of grasses

Hydrothauma is a genus of African plants in the grass family.

The only known species is Hydrothauma manicatum, native to Zaïre and Zambia.
