= Cryptachne =

Scientific classification
- Kingdom: Plantae
- Clade: Tracheophytes
- Clade: Angiosperms
- Clade: Monocots
- Clade: Commelinids
- Order: Poales
- Family: Poaceae
- Subfamily: Panicoideae
- Supertribe: Panicodae
- Tribe: Paniceae
- Subtribe: Cleistochloinae
- Genus: Cryptachne; E.J.Thomps.

Genus of grasses

Cryptachne is a genus of grasses. It includes three species which are endemic to Queensland.

- Cryptachne columboola E.J.Thomps.
- Cryptachne duaringa E.J.Thomps.
- Cryptachne trinerva E.J.Thomps.
