= Lucy Katherine Armitage Chippindall =

South African botanist and agrostologist

- Born: 15 February 1913; Pretoria, South Africa
- Died: 4 April 1992 (aged 79)
- Occupations: botanist, agrostologist

Lucy Katherine (Kathleen) Armitage Chippindall, also known as Chipps and later as Mrs. Albert Oliff Crook (15 February 1913, Pretoria – 4 April 1992) was a South African botanist and agrostologist.

== Life ==
Lucy Katherine Armitage Chippindall was born on 15 February 1913 in Pretoria. She studied at St. Mary's Diocesan School in Pretoria from 1919 to 1929, and then at the University of Witwatersrand, graduating as a Bachelor of Sciences in 1948. As a teenager Chippindall worked at haberdashery department of a store in Pretoria and then at the Botanical Research Institute. She was a Technical Assistant in the Division of Botany in Pretoria from 1931 to 1945. She specialized in the taxonomy of the Gramineae. Chippindall is also considered a specialty author on spermatophytes.

== Career ==
After she married Albert Oliff Crook, Chippindall moved to Rhodesia and started to work on the botanical section of the book published in 1955 - The grasses and pastures of South Africa. Living in Rhodesia Chippindall worked for a time at the Government Herbarium, Salisbury. She had one son.

After retirement from the Conservation Department in Rhodesia Chippindall and her husband A. O. Crook continued to collect and identify the grasses mainly in the Umtali area, publishing their work 240 Grasses of Southern Africa in 1976. In the 1980s Chippindall and her husband moved to Cape Town where they cooperated with the Bolus Herbarium and continued their study until the end of their lives. Chippindall also cooperated with Herbarium Royal Botanic Gardens, Kew.

Lucy Katherine Armitage Chippindall died on 4 April 1992. South African plant chippindalliae is named after her.

== Names published by Chippindall ==
- Alloeochaete namuliensis Chippind., J. S. African Bot. xi. 101 (1945)
- Craspedorhachis uniflora (Hochst. ex A.Rich.) Chippind., Meredith, Grasses & Pastures S. Afr. 205 (1955)
- Danthoniopsis acutigluma Chippind., Blumea, Suppl. 3: 27 (1946)
- Hylebates Chippind., J. S. African Bot. xi. 127 (1945)
  - Hylebates cordatus Chippind., J. S. African Bot. xi. 128 (1945)
- Loudetia pedicellata (Stent) Chippind., Meredith, Grasses & Pastures S. Afr. 280 (1955)
- Tetrapogon mossambicensis (K.Schum.) Chippind., Meredith, Grasses & Pastures S. Afr. 198 (1955)
- Urelytrum henrardii Chippind., Blumea, Suppl. 3: 25 (1946)
- Urochloa stolonifera (Goossens) Chippind., Meredith, Grasses & Pastures S. Afr. 381 (1955)
