= Thedachloa =

Scientific classification
- Kingdom: Plantae
- Clade: Tracheophytes
- Clade: Angiosperms
- Clade: Monocots
- Clade: Commelinids
- Order: Poales
- Family: Poaceae
- Subfamily: Panicoideae
- Supertribe: Panicodae
- Tribe: Paniceae
- Genus: Thedachloa; S.W.L.Jacobs (2004)
- Species: T. annua

Binomial name
- Thedachloa annua S.W.L.Jacobs (2004)

Genus of flowering plants

Thedachloa is a genus of flowering plants belonging to the family Poaceae. It contains a single species, Thedachloa annua. It is an annual grass native to northwestern Australia.
