= Cnidochloa =

Scientific classification
- Kingdom: Plantae
- Clade: Tracheophytes
- Clade: Angiosperms
- Clade: Monocots
- Clade: Commelinids
- Order: Poales
- Family: Poaceae
- Subfamily: Panicoideae
- Supertribe: Panicodae
- Tribe: Paniceae
- Genus: Cnidochloa; Zuloaga
- Species: C. longipedicellata

Binomial name
- Cnidochloa longipedicellata (Swallen) Zuloaga

Synonyms
- Panicum longipedicellatum Swallen

Genus of grasses

Cnidochloa is a genus of grasses. It includes a single species, Cnidochloa longipedicellata, a perennial or rhizomatous geophyte native to southern and southeastern Brazil. It flowers from December to May.

It grows along forest margins and in forest clearings from 700 to 1400 meters elevation in the states of Rio de Janeiro, Parana, and Santa Catarina.

The species was first described as Panicum longipedicellatum in 1966 by Jason Richard Swallen. In 2020 Fernando Omar Zuloaga placed the species in a new monotypic genus as Cnidochloa longipedicellata, based on morphological, anatomical, and phylogenetic characteristics. It is distinguished from other species in subtribe Paniceae by an upper glume which is as long as the spikelet, absent lower palea and lower flower, conspicuous papillae covering the whole surface of the upper anthecium, and lemma with flat margins over the palea.
