= Pseudolasiacis =

Scientific classification
- Kingdom: Plantae
- Clade: Tracheophytes
- Clade: Angiosperms
- Clade: Monocots
- Clade: Commelinids
- Order: Poales
- Family: Poaceae
- Subfamily: Panicoideae
- Supertribe: Panicodae
- Tribe: Paniceae
- Genus: Pseudolasiacis (A.Camus) A.Camus

Genus of grasses

Pseudolasiacis is a genus of grasses. It includes three species native to the western Indian Ocean islands of Madagascar, the Comoros, and Réunion.

- Pseudolasiacis bathiei (A.Camus) A.Camus
- Pseudolasiacis leptolomoides (A.Camus) A.Camus
- Pseudolasiacis neoperrieri (A.Camus) A.Camus
