= Homopholis belsonii =

Scientific classification
- Kingdom: Plantae
- Clade: Tracheophytes
- Clade: Angiosperms
- Clade: Monocots
- Clade: Commelinids
- Order: Poales
- Family: Poaceae
- Subfamily: Panicoideae
- Supertribe: Panicodae
- Tribe: Paniceae
- Genus: Homopholis; C.E.Hubb.
- Species: H. belsonii

Binomial name
- Homopholis belsonii C.E.Hubb.

Species of grass

Homopholis is a genus of Australian plants in the grass family.

Species

The only known species is Homopholis belsonii, native to the States of Queensland and New South Wales in Australia.

formerly included

see Panicum

- Homopholis proluta - Panicum prolutum
