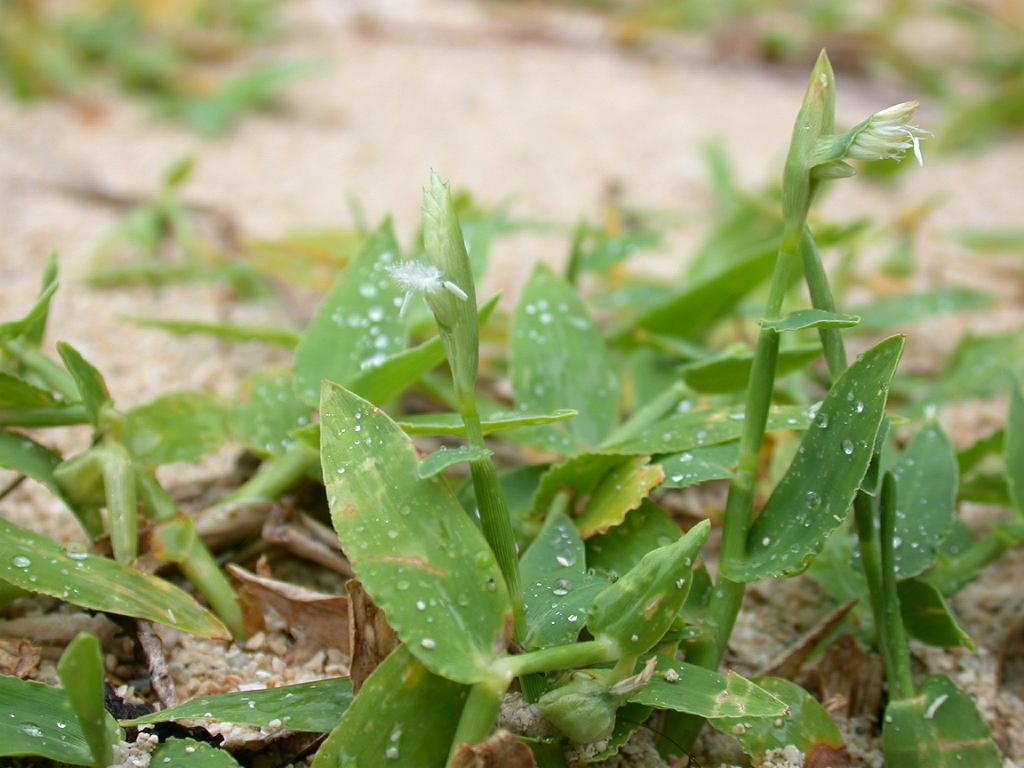
- Thuarea involuta

Scientific classification
- Kingdom: Plantae
- Clade: Tracheophytes
- Clade: Angiosperms
- Clade: Monocots
- Clade: Commelinids
- Order: Poales
- Family: Poaceae
- Subfamily: Panicoideae
- Supertribe: Panicodae
- Tribe: Paniceae
- Subtribe: Melinidinae
- Genus: Thuarea; Pers.

Type species
- Thuarea sarmentosa (syn of T. involuta) Pers.

Synonyms
- Microthuareia A.Thouars; Ornithocephalochloa Kurz; Thouarsia Kuntze

= Thuarea =

Genus of grasses

Thuarea is a genus of plants in the grass family, native to Asia, Africa, Australia, and various islands of the Indian and Pacific Oceans.

Species:

- Thuarea involuta (G.Forst.) R.Br. ex Sm. - Madagascar, China, Japan (incl Bonin, Volcano, Ryukyu Is), Bangladesh, Sri Lanka, Indian Islands (Andaman, Nicobar, Laccadive), Thailand, Vietnam, Cambodia, Malaysia, Indonesia, Philippines, Papuasia, Queensland, Northern Territory, Melanesia, Micronesia, Hawaii.
- Thuarea perrieri A.Camus - Madagascar
