= Whiteochloa =

Scientific classification
- Kingdom: Plantae
- Clade: Tracheophytes
- Clade: Angiosperms
- Clade: Monocots
- Clade: Commelinids
- Order: Poales
- Family: Poaceae
- Subfamily: Panicoideae
- Supertribe: Panicodae
- Tribe: Paniceae
- Subtribe: Cenchrinae
- Genus: Whiteochloa; C.E.Hubb.

Type species
- Whiteochloa semitonsa (F.Muell. ex Benth.) C.E.Hubb.

Genus of grasses

Whiteochloa is a genus of plants in the grass family.

The genus is native to Australia, New Guinea, and Indonesia. It is named for Australian botanist Cyril Tenison White, 1890–1950.

Species

1. Whiteochloa airoides (R.Br.) Lazarides - Northern Territory, QLD, Western Australia
2. Whiteochloa biciliata Lazarides - Western Australia
3. Whiteochloa capillipes (Benth.) Lazarides - New Guinea, Lesser Sunda Islands, Maluku, Northern Territory, QLD, Western Australia
4. Whiteochloa cymbiformis (Hughes) B.K.Simon - Northern Territory, QLD, Western Australia, New South Wales
5. Whiteochloa multiciliata Lazarides - Northern Territory,
6. Whiteochloa semitonsa (F.Muell. ex Benth.) C.E.Hubb. - Northern Territory, QLD
