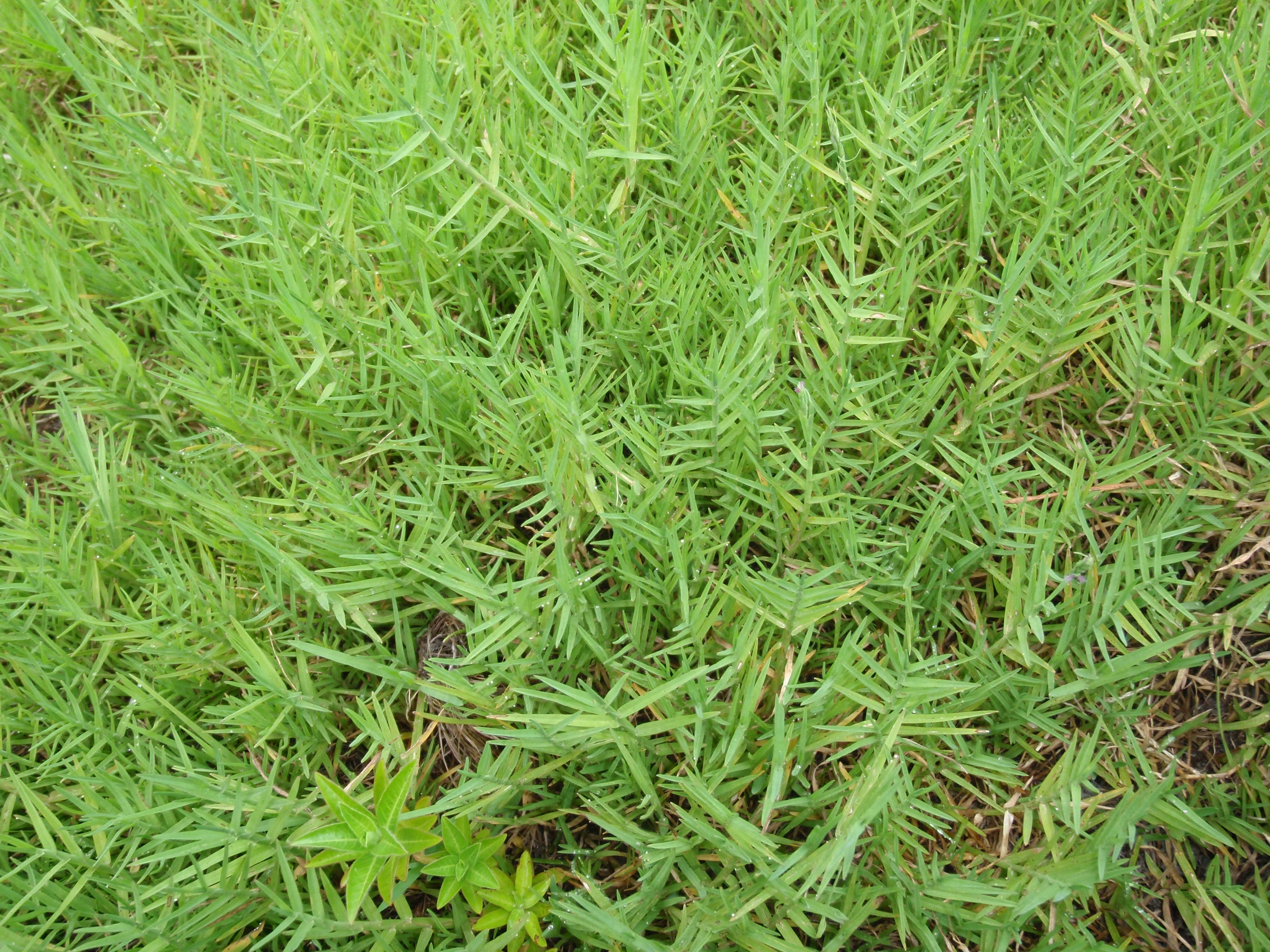
- Pseudoraphis spinescens

Scientific classification
- Kingdom: Plantae
- Clade: Tracheophytes
- Clade: Angiosperms
- Clade: Monocots
- Clade: Commelinids
- Order: Poales
- Family: Poaceae
- Subfamily: Panicoideae
- Supertribe: Panicodae
- Tribe: Paniceae
- Subtribe: Cenchrinae
- Genus: Pseudoraphis; Griff. ex Pilg. 1928

Synonyms
- Pseudoraphis Griff. 1851; as synonym

= Pseudoraphis =

Mudgrasses

Genus of grasses

Pseudoraphis is a genus of Asian and Australian plants in the grass family, commonly known as mudgrasses.

They grow in open, wet habitat, such as marshes. Some are aquatic, floating plants. A defining characteristic is a long, stiff bristle extending from the tip of each branch of the inflorescence. Pseudoraphis is closely related to the genus Chamaeraphis.

Species

- Pseudoraphis balansae - Hainan, Thailand, Vietnam
- Pseudoraphis brunoniana - Anhui, Guangdong, Taiwan, Japan, Assam, Bangladesh, Sri Lanka, Myanmar, Philippines, Thailand, Vietnam
- Pseudoraphis jagonis - Queensland
- Pseudoraphis minuta - Queensland, Northern Territory, Vietnam, Myanmar, India, Bangladesh
- Pseudoraphis paradoxa - Queensland, New South Wales, Victoria, Western Australia
- Pseudoraphis sordida - Japan, Korea, Fujian, Hubei, Hunan, Jiangsu, Shandong, Yunnan, Zhejiang, India, Sri Lanka
- Pseudoraphis spinescens - Moira grass, spiny mudgrass - Australia, New Guinea, Southeast Asia, Indian subcontinent
