= Oryzidium =

Scientific classification
- Kingdom: Plantae
- Clade: Tracheophytes
- Clade: Angiosperms
- Clade: Monocots
- Clade: Commelinids
- Order: Poales
- Family: Poaceae
- Subfamily: Panicoideae
- Supertribe: Panicodae
- Tribe: Paniceae
- Genus: Oryzidium; C.E.Hubb. & Schweick.
- Species: O. barnardii

Binomial name
- Oryzidium barnardii C.E.Hubb. & Schweick.

Genus of grasses

Oryzidium is a genus of African plants in the grass family.

Species

The only known species is Oryzidium barnardii, native to Angola, Zambia, Zimbabwe, Botswana, and Namibia.
