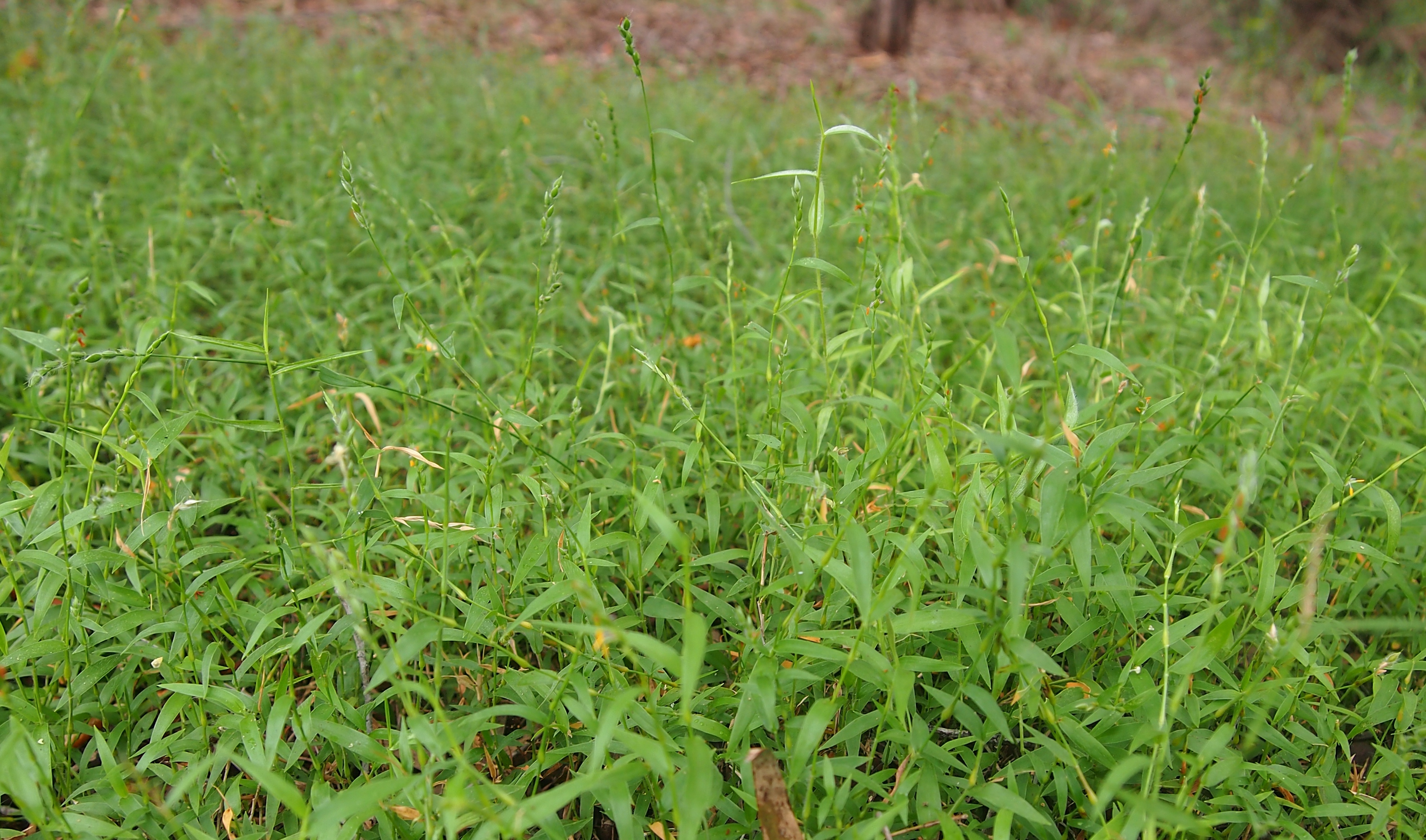

Scientific classification
- Kingdom: Plantae
- Clade: Tracheophytes
- Clade: Angiosperms
- Clade: Monocots
- Clade: Commelinids
- Order: Poales
- Family: Poaceae
- Subfamily: Panicoideae
- Supertribe: Panicodae
- Tribe: Paniceae
- Subtribe: Neurachninae
- Genus: Calyptochloa; C.E.Hubb.

= Calyptochloa =

Genus of grasses

Calyptochloa is a genus of grass (family Poaceae). It includes three species, which are endemic to Queensland, Australia.

== Species ==
Three species are accepted:

- Calyptochloa cylindrosperma E.J.Thomps. & B.K.Simon
- Calyptochloa gracillima C.E.Hubb.
  - Calyptochloa gracillima subsp. ipsviciensis
- Calyptochloa johnsoniana E.J.Thomps. & B.K.Simon

== See also ==
- List of Poaceae genera
