= Trichanthecium =

Scientific classification
- Kingdom: Plantae
- Clade: Embryophytes
- Clade: Tracheophytes
- Clade: Angiosperms
- Clade: Monocots
- Clade: Commelinids
- Order: Poales
- Family: Poaceae
- Subfamily: Panicoideae
- Supertribe: Panicodae
- Tribe: Paniceae
- Genus: Trichanthecium; Zuloaga & Morrone

Genus of grasses

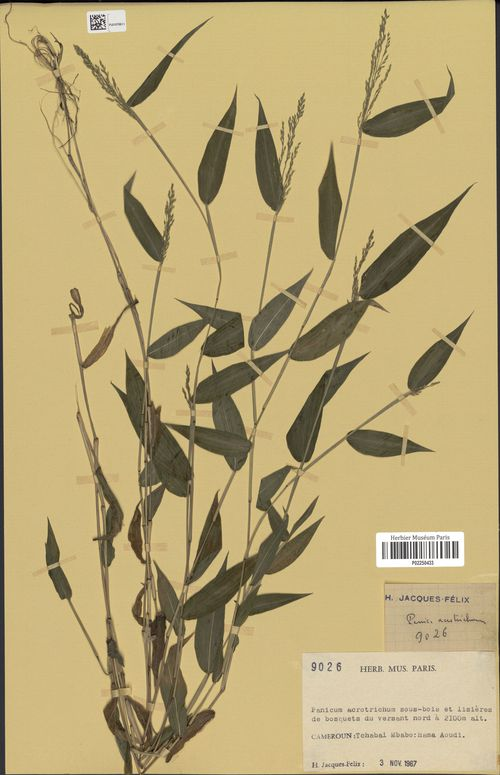
Panicum acrotrichum herbarium specimen

Trichanthecium is a genus of grasses. It includes 52 species, native to the tropical Americas from southeastern Mexico to northeastern Argentina, and to sub-Saharan Africa and Madagascar.

== Species ==
52 species are accepted:

- Trichanthecium acrotrichum (Hook.f.) Zuloaga
- Trichanthecium aequinerve (Nees) Zuloaga
- Trichanthecium arctum (Swallen) Zuloaga & Morrone
- Trichanthecium auricomum (Nees ex Trin.) Zuloaga & Morrone
- Trichanthecium brazzavillense (Franch.) Zuloaga & Morrone
- Trichanthecium caaguazuense (Henrard) Zuloaga & Morrone
- Trichanthecium calvum (Stapf) Zuloaga
- Trichanthecium chionachne (Mez) Zuloaga
- Trichanthecium cyanescens (Nees ex Trin.) Zuloaga & Morrone
- Trichanthecium delicatulum (Fig. & De Not.) Zuloaga
- Trichanthecium dinklagei (Mez) Zuloaga & Morrone
- Trichanthecium distichophyllum (Spreng.) Zuloaga & Morrone
- Trichanthecium eickii (Mez) Zuloaga
- Trichanthecium filifolium (Clayton) Zuloaga & Morrone
- Trichanthecium fonticola (Swallen) Zuloaga & Morrone
- Trichanthecium glaucocladum (C.E.Hubb.) Zuloaga & Morrone
- Trichanthecium gracilicaule (Rendle) Zuloaga & Morrone
- Trichanthecium granuliferum (Kunth) Zuloaga & Morrone
- Trichanthecium hochstetteri (Steud.) Zuloaga
- Trichanthecium ichunense (Swallen) Zuloaga & Morrone
- Trichanthecium inaequilatum (Stapf & C.E.Hubb.) Zuloaga
- Trichanthecium machrisianum (Swallen) Zuloaga & Morrone
- Trichanthecium margaritiferum (Chiov.) Zuloaga & Morrone
- Trichanthecium marunguense Zuloaga
- Trichanthecium micranthum (Kunth) Zuloaga & Morrone
- Trichanthecium mueense (Vanderyst) Zuloaga & Morrone
- Trichanthecium natalense (Hochst.) Zuloaga & Morrone
- Trichanthecium nervatum (Franch.) Zuloaga & Morrone
- Trichanthecium nervosum (Lam.) Zuloaga & Morrone
- Trichanthecium noterophilum (Renvoize) Zuloaga & Morrone
- Trichanthecium nutabundum (Zuloaga & Morrone) Zuloaga & Morrone
- Trichanthecium orinocanum (Luces) Zuloaga & Morrone
- Trichanthecium pandum (Swallen) Zuloaga & Morrone
- Trichanthecium parvifolium (Lam.) Zuloaga & Morrone
- Trichanthecium perrieri (A.Camus) Zuloaga
- Trichanthecium petilum (Swallen) Zuloaga & Morrone
- Trichanthecium petrense (Swallen) Zuloaga & Morrone
- Trichanthecium polycomum (Trin.) Zuloaga & Morrone
- Trichanthecium praealtum (Afzel. ex Sw.) Zuloaga & Morrone
- Trichanthecium pseudisachne (Mez) Zuloaga & Morrone
- Trichanthecium pusillum (Hook.f.) Zuloaga
- Trichanthecium pyrularium (Hitchc. & Chase) Zuloaga & Morrone
- Trichanthecium rivale (Swallen) Zuloaga & Morrone
- Trichanthecium schwackeanum (Mez) Zuloaga & Morrone
- Trichanthecium striatissimum (C.E.Hubb.) Zuloaga
- Trichanthecium strictissimum (Afzel. ex Sw.) Zuloaga & Morrone
- Trichanthecium tenellum (Lam.) Zuloaga & Morrone
- Trichanthecium tenerium Xanthos
- Trichanthecium tepuianum (Davidse & Zuloaga) Zuloaga & Morrone
- Trichanthecium wettsteinii (Hack.) Zuloaga & Morrone
- Trichanthecium wiehei (Renvoize) Zuloaga
- Trichanthecium yavitaense (Swallen) Zuloaga & Morrone
