= Chaetopoa =

Scientific classification
- Kingdom: Plantae
- Clade: Tracheophytes
- Clade: Angiosperms
- Clade: Monocots
- Clade: Commelinids
- Order: Poales
- Family: Poaceae
- Subfamily: Panicoideae
- Supertribe: Panicodae
- Tribe: Paniceae
- Subtribe: Anthephorinae
- Genus: Chaetopoa; C.E.Hubb.

Type species
- Chaetopoa taylorii C.E.Hubb.

Genus of grasses

Chaetopoa is a genus of African plants in the grass family, found only in Tanzania.

Species

- Chaetopoa pilosa Clayton - Mbeya Region in southwestern Tanzania
- Chaetopoa taylorii C.E.Hubb. - Tanzania

== See also ==
- List of Poaceae genera
