= Snowdenia =

Scientific classification
- Kingdom: Plantae
- Clade: Tracheophytes
- Clade: Angiosperms
- Clade: Monocots
- Clade: Commelinids
- Order: Poales
- Family: Poaceae
- Subfamily: Panicoideae
- Supertribe: Panicodae
- Tribe: Paniceae
- Subtribe: Cenchrinae
- Genus: Snowdenia; C.E.Hubb.

Type species
- Snowdenia microcarpha C.E.Hubb.

Synonyms
- Beckera Fresen.

Genus of plants

Snowdenia is a genus of plants in the grass family, they are native to Arabia and East Africa.

The genus was circumscribed by Charles Edward Hubbard in Bull. Misc. Inform. Kew (1929) on page 30 in 1929.

The genus name of Snowdenia is in honour of Joseph Devenport Snowden (1886–1973), who was a British gardener, botanist and mycologist. Who worked at Kew Gardens.

== Species ==
As accepted by Kew;

- Snowdenia microcarpha C.E.Hubb. - Uganda
- Snowdenia mutica (Hochst.) Pilg. - Ethiopia
- Snowdenia petitiana (A.Rich.) C.E.Hubb. - Ethiopia, Kenya, Tanzania, Uganda, Yemen
- Snowdenia polystachya (Fresen.) Pilg. - Ethiopia, Eritrea, Sudan, Kenya, Tanzania, Uganda, Yemen, Saudi Arabia
