= Pseudechinolaena =

Scientific classification
- Kingdom: Plantae
- Clade: Tracheophytes
- Clade: Angiosperms
- Clade: Monocots
- Clade: Commelinids
- Order: Poales
- Family: Poaceae
- Subfamily: Panicoideae
- Supertribe: Panicodae
- Tribe: Paniceae
- Subtribe: Boivinellinae
- Genus: Pseudechinolaena (Hook.f.) Stapf

Type species
- Panicum uncinatum Raddi

Synonyms
- Panicum sect. Pseudechinolaena Hook.f.; Perulifera A.Camus; Loxostachys Peter

Genus of grasses

Pseudechinolaena is a genus of tropical and subtropical plants in the grass family, all but one species endemic to Madagascar.

Species

- Pseudechinolaena camusiana Bosser - Madagascar
- Pseudechinolaena madagascariensis (A.Camus) Bosser - Madagascar
- Pseudechinolaena moratii Bosser - Madagascar
- Pseudechinolaena perrieri A.Camus - Madagascar
- Pseudechinolaena polystachya (Humb., Bonpl. & Kunth) Stapf - tropical - southern Africa, Asia (China, Indian subcontinent, Thailand, Vietnam, Malaysia, Indonesia), New Guinea, Latin America (from central Mexico to Uruguay)
- Pseudechinolaena tenuis Bosser - Madagascar

Formerly included

see Echinochloa

- Pseudechinolaena helodes - Echinochloa helodes
- Pseudechinolaena inflexa - Echinochloa inflexa
- Pseudechinolaena spectabilis - Echinochloa polystachya
