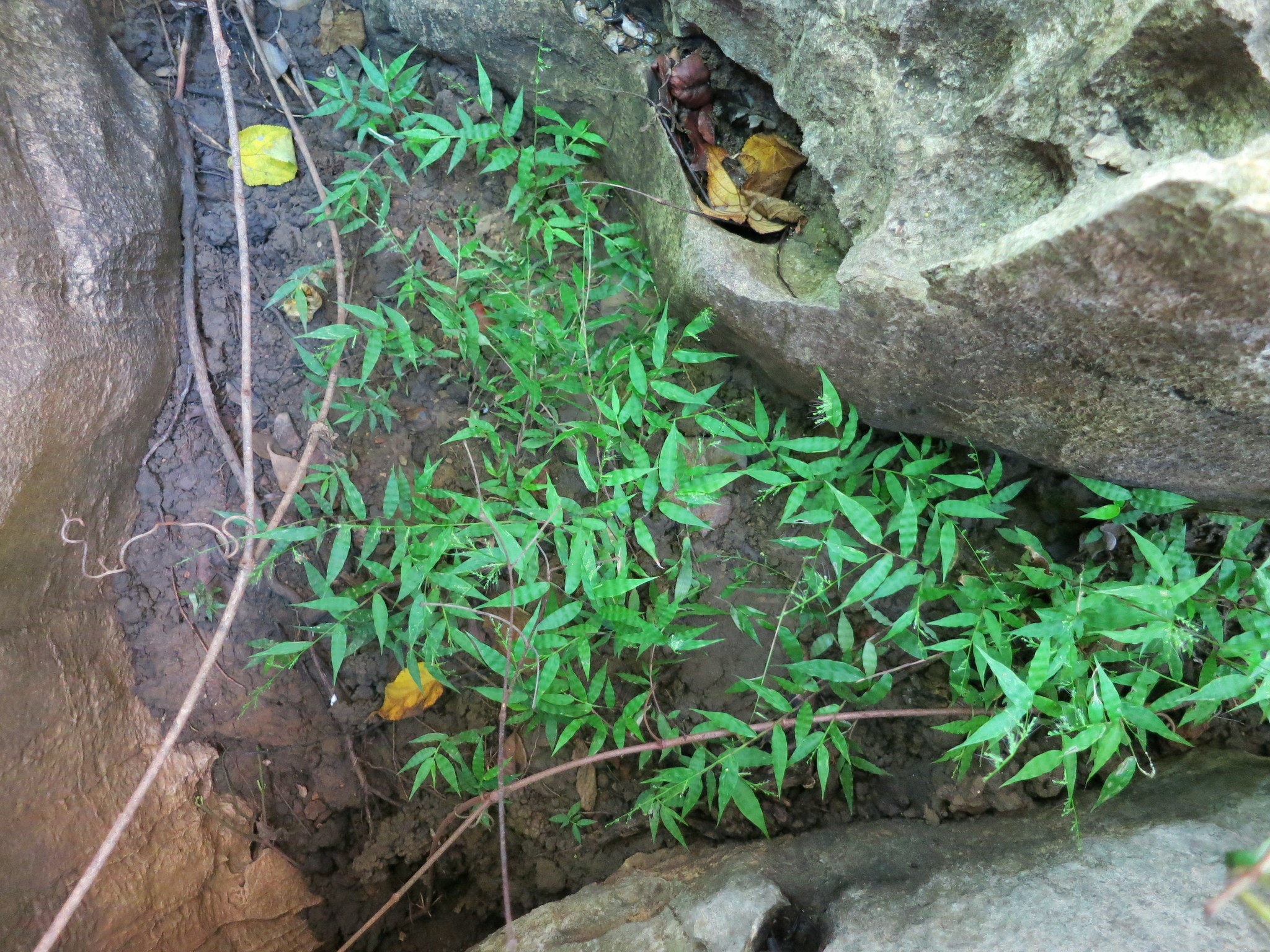
- C. madagascariensis near Sirama, Madagascar

Scientific classification
- Kingdom: Plantae
- Clade: Embryophytes
- Clade: Tracheophytes
- Clade: Spermatophytes
- Clade: Angiosperms
- Clade: Monocots
- Clade: Commelinids
- Order: Poales
- Family: Poaceae
- Subfamily: Panicoideae
- Supertribe: Panicodae
- Tribe: Paniceae
- Subtribe: Boivinellinae
- Genus: Cyphochlaena; Hack.

Type species
- Cyphochlaena madagascariensis Hack.

Synonyms
- Boivinella A.Camus

= Cyphochlaena =

Genus of grasses

Cyphochlaena is a genus of plants in the grass family native to certain islands in the Indian Ocean.

Species

- Cyphochlaena madagascariensis Hack. - Comoros, Madagascar
- Cyphochlaena sclerioides (A.Camus) Bosser - Madagascar
