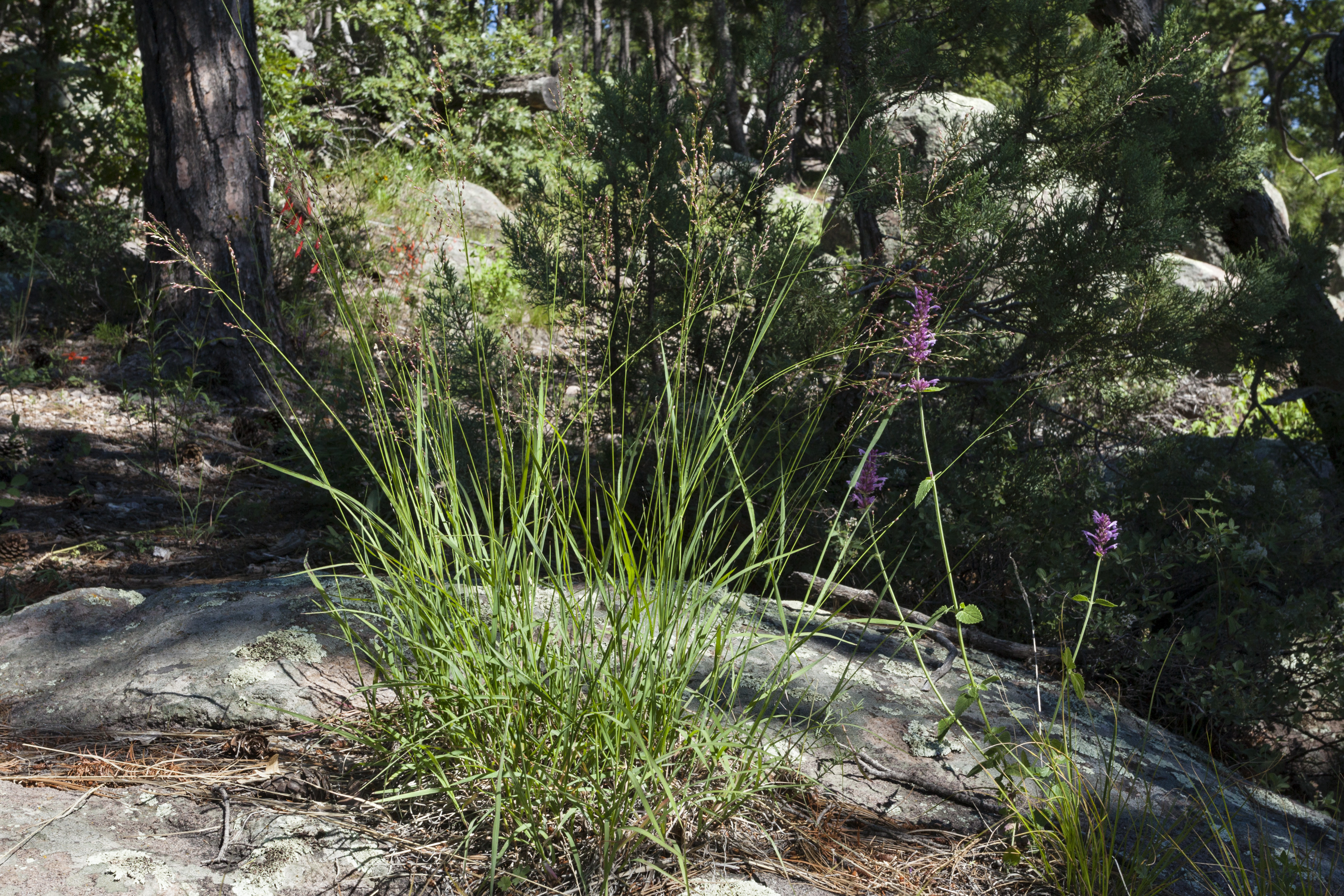

Scientific classification
- Kingdom: Plantae
- Clade: Tracheophytes
- Clade: Angiosperms
- Clade: Monocots
- Clade: Commelinids
- Order: Poales
- Family: Poaceae
- Subfamily: Panicoideae
- Supertribe: Panicodae
- Tribe: Paniceae
- Subtribe: Cenchrinae
- Genus: Zuloagaea; Bess
- Species: Z. bulbosa

Binomial name
- Zuloagaea bulbosa (Kunth) Bess

Synonyms
- Panicum altissimum Brouss. in Elench. Horti Bot. Monspel.: 42 (1805), nom. nud.; Panicum avenaceum Kunth in F.W.H.von Humboldt, A.J.A.Bonpland & C.S.Kunth, Nov. Gen. Sp. 1: 99 (1816); Panicum bulbosum Kunth in F.W.H.von Humboldt, A.J.A.Bonpland & C.S.Kunth, Nov. Gen. Sp. 1: 99 (1816); Panicum bulbosum var. avenaceum (Kunth) Beal in Grass. N. Amer. 2: 132 (1896); Panicum bulbosum var. minus Vasey in Bull. Div. Bot. U.S.D.A. 8: 38 (1889); Panicum bulbosum subsp. sciaphilum (E.Fourn.) Hitchc. & Chase in Contr. U.S. Natl. Herb. 15: 83 (1910); Panicum bulbosum subvar. violaceum E.Fourn. in Mexic. Pl. 2: 27 (1886); Panicum confusum Trin. ex Steud. in Nomencl. Bot., ed. 2, 2: 254 (1841), pro syn.; Panicum gongylodes J.Jacq. in Ecl. Gram. Rar.: 30 (1814); Panicum maximum var. bulbosum (Kunth) Vasey in J.T.Rothrock, Rep. U.S. Geogr. Surv., Wheeler 6(Botany): 295 (1878 publ. 1879); Panicum maximum var. gongylodes (J.Jacq.) Döll in C.F.P.von Martius & auct. suc. (eds.), Fl. Bras. 2(2): 203 (1877); Panicum nodosum Willd. ex Steud. in Nomencl. Bot., ed. 2, 2: 260 (1841), pro syn.; Panicum paucifolium Swallen in Contr. U.S. Natl. Herb. 29: 417 (1950); Panicum polygamum var. gongylodes (J.Jacq.) E.Fourn. in Mexic. Pl. 2: 28 (1886); Panicum sciaphilum E.Fourn. in Mexic. Pl. 2: 19 (1886)

= Zuloagaea =

Genus of grasses

Zuloagaea ('panic grass') is a monotypic genus of the Central American plants in the grass family. It only contains one known species, Zuloagaea bulbosa (Kunth) Bess It was formerly known as Panicum bulbosum Kunth

It is native to United States of America (within the states of Arizona, New Mexico, Texas and Utah) and also Central America (within the countries of Colombia, Ecuador, Guatemala, Honduras, Mexico and Nicaragua).

The genus was circumscribed by Emilie C. Bess in Systematic Botany vol. 31 on page 666 in 2006.

The genus name of Zuloagaea is in honour of Fernando Omar Zuloaga (b.1951), an Argentinian botanist and Professor of Phytogeography from the National University of La Plata. He was between 1991 - 1998 curator and director of the Instituto de Botánica Darwinion.

The genus and species is recognized by the United States Department of Agriculture and the Agricultural Research Service, since 29 December 2006.
