= Rupichloa =

Scientific classification
- Kingdom: Plantae
- Clade: Tracheophytes
- Clade: Angiosperms
- Clade: Monocots
- Clade: Commelinids
- Order: Poales
- Family: Poaceae
- Subfamily: Panicoideae
- Supertribe: Panicodae
- Tribe: Paniceae
- Subtribe: Melinidinae
- Genus: Rupichloa; Salariato & Morrone

Type species
- Rupichloa acuminata (Renvoize) D.Salariato & Morrone

Genus of grasses

Rupichloa is a genus of Brazilian plants in the grass family.

Species

- Rupichloa acuminata (Renvoize) Salariato & Morrone - Bahia, Minas Gerais
- Rupichloa decidua (Morrone & Zuloaga) Salariato & Morrone - Bahia
