= Louisiella =

Scientific classification
- Kingdom: Plantae
- Clade: Tracheophytes
- Clade: Angiosperms
- Clade: Monocots
- Clade: Commelinids
- Order: Poales
- Family: Poaceae
- Subfamily: Panicoideae
- Supertribe: Panicodae
- Tribe: Paniceae
- Subtribe: Panicinae
- Genus: Louisiella; C.E.Hubb. & J.Léonard

Type species
- Louisiella fluitans C.E.Hubb. & J.Léonard

Genus of grasses

Louisiella is a genus of African, Neotropical and tropical plants in the grass family. Earlier the genus was known to comprise only two species i.e. L. fluitans and L. elephantipes. Mr. Shahid Nawaz, an agrostologist at the Blatter Herbarium (BLAT), transferred a species Panicum paludosum Roxb. into Louisiella based on critical study of the morphological features. Now, there are three globally accepted species in the genus.

Species

- Louisiella fluitans C.E.Hubb. & J.Léonard - Cameroon, Zaïre, Central African Republic, South Sudan, and Sudan
- Louisiella elephantipes (Nees ex Trin.) Zuloaga - Latin America (from southern Mexico and the Greater Antilles to Uruguay).
- Louisiella paludosa (Roxb.) Landge - India, Southeast Asia up to Australia.
