= Thyridachne =

Scientific classification
- Kingdom: Plantae
- Clade: Tracheophytes
- Clade: Angiosperms
- Clade: Monocots
- Clade: Commelinids
- Order: Poales
- Family: Poaceae
- Subfamily: Panicoideae
- Supertribe: Panicodae
- Tribe: Paniceae
- Subtribe: Anthephorinae
- Genus: Thyridachne; C.E.Hubb.
- Species: T. tisserantii

Binomial name
- Thyridachne tisserantii C.E.Hubb.

Synonyms
- Tisserantiella Mimeur [1949], illegitimate homonym not P. de la Varde 1941 (a moss, family Rhachitheciaceae); Tisserantiella oubanguiensis Mimeur

Genus of grasses

Thyridachne is a genus of plants in the family Poaceae. The only known species is Thyridachne tisserantii, native to the Democratic Republic of the Congo and the Central African Republic.
