= Holcolemma =

Scientific classification
- Kingdom: Plantae
- Clade: Tracheophytes
- Clade: Angiosperms
- Clade: Monocots
- Clade: Commelinids
- Order: Poales
- Family: Poaceae
- Subfamily: Panicoideae
- Supertribe: Panicodae
- Tribe: Paniceae
- Subtribe: Cenchrinae
- Genus: Holcolemma; Stapf & C.E.Hubb.

Genus of grasses

Holcolemma is a genus of African, Asian, and Australian plants in the grass family.

Species

- Holcolemma canaliculatum (Steud.) Stapf & C.E.Hubb. - Tanzania, India (Tamil Nadu), Sri Lanka
- Holcolemma dispar Clayton - Queensland
- Holcolemma inaequale Clayton - Tanzania, Kenya, Somalia
