= Trachys (plant) =

Scientific classification
- Kingdom: Plantae
- Clade: Tracheophytes
- Clade: Angiosperms
- Clade: Monocots
- Clade: Commelinids
- Order: Poales
- Family: Poaceae
- Subfamily: Panicoideae
- Supertribe: Panicodae
- Tribe: Paniceae
- Subtribe: Anthephorinae
- Genus: Trachys; Pers.

Synonyms
- Trachyozus Rchb.; Trachystachys A.Dietr.

Genus of grasses

Trachys is a genus of Asian plants in the grass family.

Species

- Trachys copeana Kabeer & V.J.Nair - Tamil Nadu
- Trachys muricata (L.) Pers. ex Trin. - India, Myanmar, Sri Lanka
