= Taeniorhachis =

Scientific classification
- Kingdom: Plantae
- Clade: Tracheophytes
- Clade: Angiosperms
- Clade: Monocots
- Clade: Commelinids
- Order: Poales
- Family: Poaceae
- Subfamily: Panicoideae
- Supertribe: Panicodae
- Tribe: Paniceae
- Subtribe: Anthephorinae
- Genus: Taeniorhachis; Cope
- Species: T. repens

Binomial name
- Taeniorhachis repens Cope

Genus of grasses

Taeniorhachis is a genus of plants in the grass family. The only known species is Taeniorhachis repens, native to Somalia.
