= Hylebates =

Scientific classification
- Kingdom: Plantae
- Clade: Tracheophytes
- Clade: Angiosperms
- Clade: Monocots
- Clade: Commelinids
- Order: Poales
- Family: Poaceae
- Subfamily: Panicoideae
- Supertribe: Panicodae
- Tribe: Paniceae
- Genus: Hylebates; Chippind.

Type species
- Hylebates cordatus Chippind.

Genus of plants

Hylebates is a genus of African plants in the grass family.

Species

- Hylebates chlorochloe (K.Schum.) Napper – Tanzania, Kenya
- Hylebates cordatus Chippind. – Tanzania, Mozambique, Zambia, Zimbabwe
