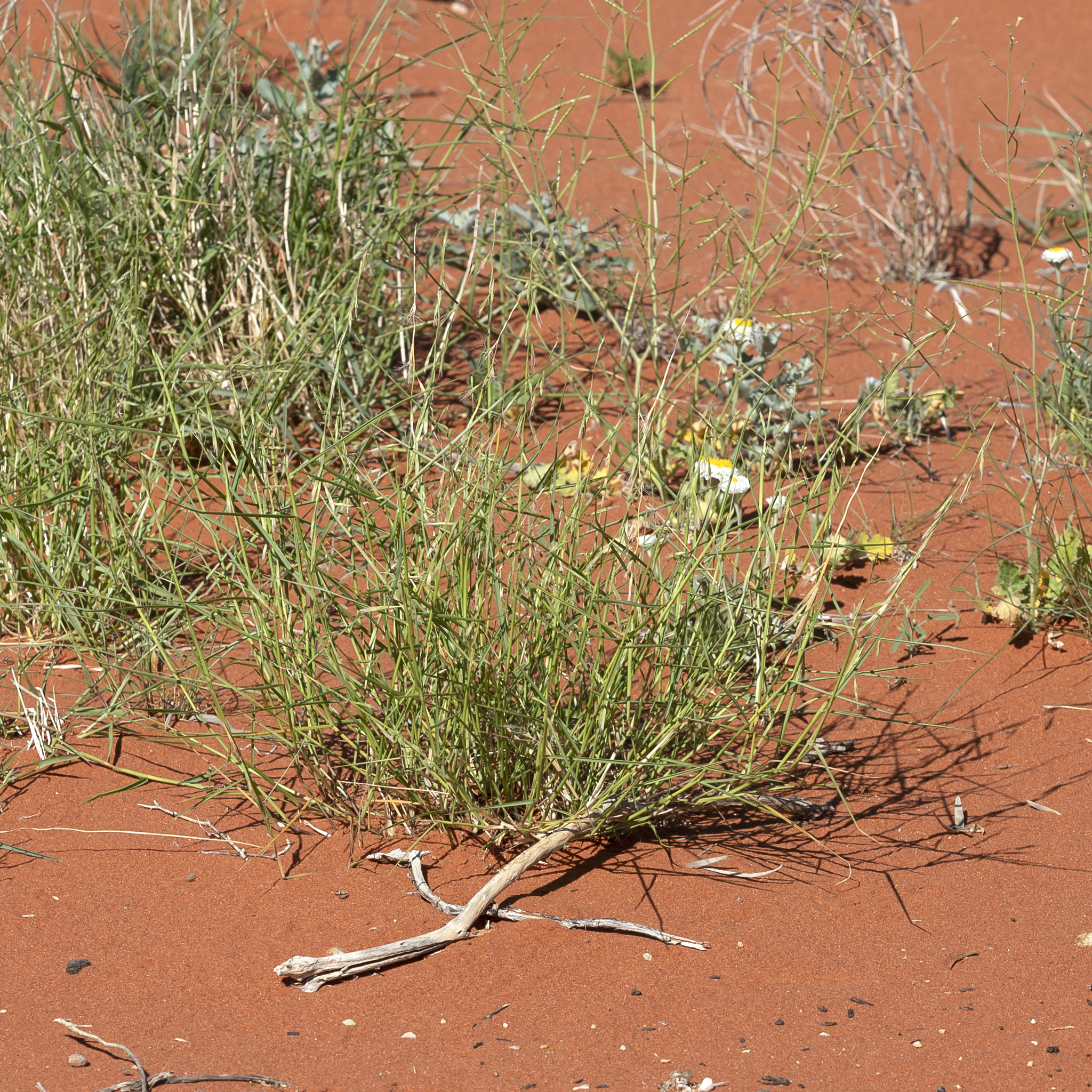

Scientific classification
- Kingdom: Plantae
- Clade: Tracheophytes
- Clade: Angiosperms
- Clade: Monocots
- Clade: Commelinids
- Order: Poales
- Family: Poaceae
- Subfamily: Panicoideae
- Supertribe: Panicodae
- Tribe: Paniceae
- Subtribe: Cenchrinae
- Genus: Plagiosetum; Benth.
- Species: P. refractum

Binomial name
- Plagiosetum refractum (F.Muell.) R.D.Webster

Synonyms
- Setaria refracta F.Muell.; Pennisetum refractum (F.Muell.) F.Muell.; Panicum refractum (F.Muell.) F.Muell.; Paractaenum refractum (F.Muell.) R.D.Webster

= Plagiosetum =

Species of plant

Plagiosetum is a genus of plants in the grass family. The only known species is Plagiosetum refractum, found in Queensland, Northern Territory, South Australia, Western Australia, and New South Wales.
