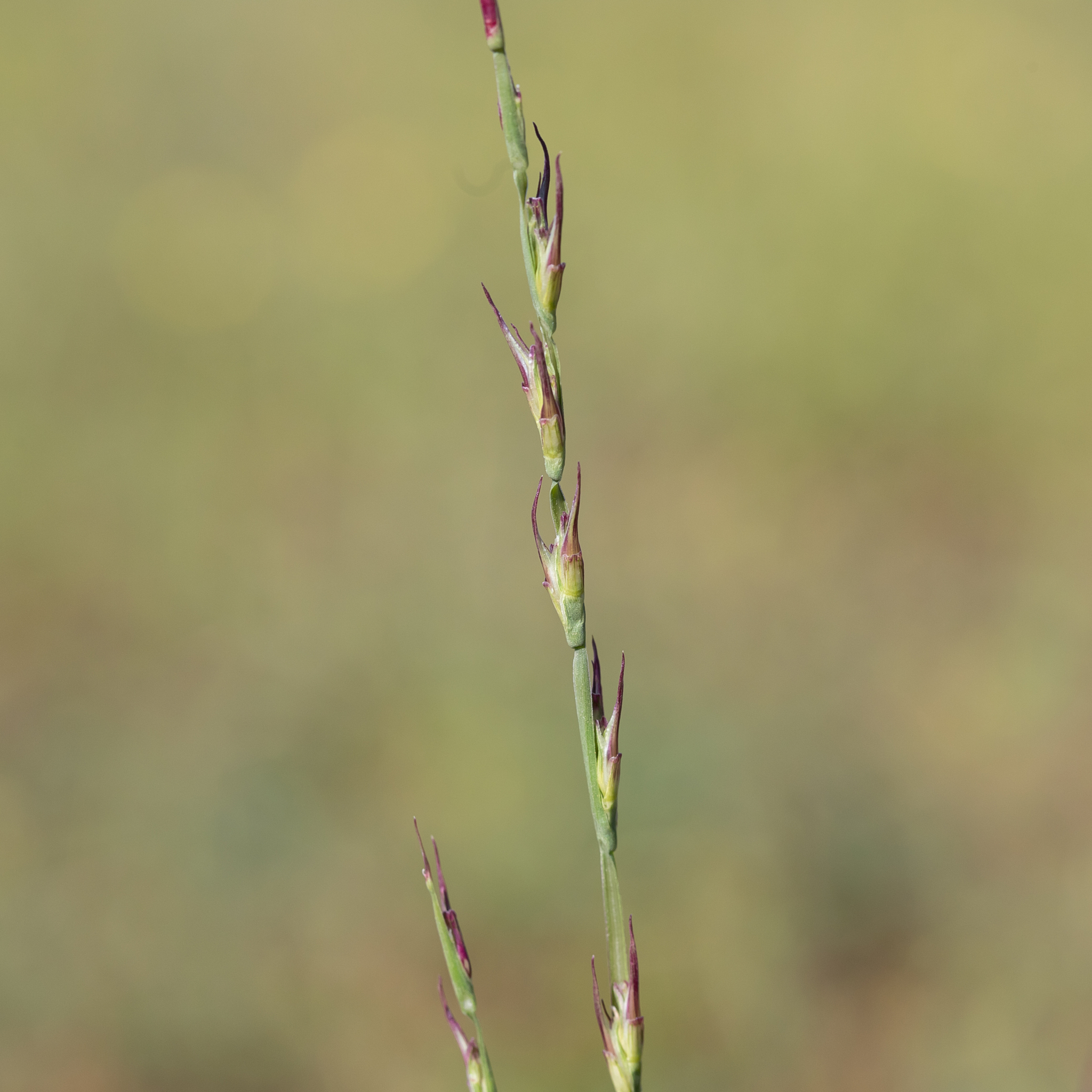
- Uranthoecium truncatum

Scientific classification
- Kingdom: Plantae
- Clade: Tracheophytes
- Clade: Angiosperms
- Clade: Monocots
- Clade: Commelinids
- Order: Poales
- Family: Poaceae
- Subfamily: Panicoideae
- Supertribe: Panicodae
- Tribe: Paniceae
- Subtribe: Cenchrinae
- Genus: Uranthoecium (Maiden & Betche) Stapf
- Species: U. truncatum

Binomial name
- Uranthoecium truncatum (Maiden & Betche) Stapf

Synonyms
- Rottboellia truncata Maiden & Betche

= Uranthoecium =

Flat-stem grass

Genus of plants

Uranthoecium is a genus of plants in the grass family. The only known species is Uranthoecium truncatum, native to Queensland, New South Wales, South Australia, Northern Territory, and Western Australia. A common name is flat-stem grass.
