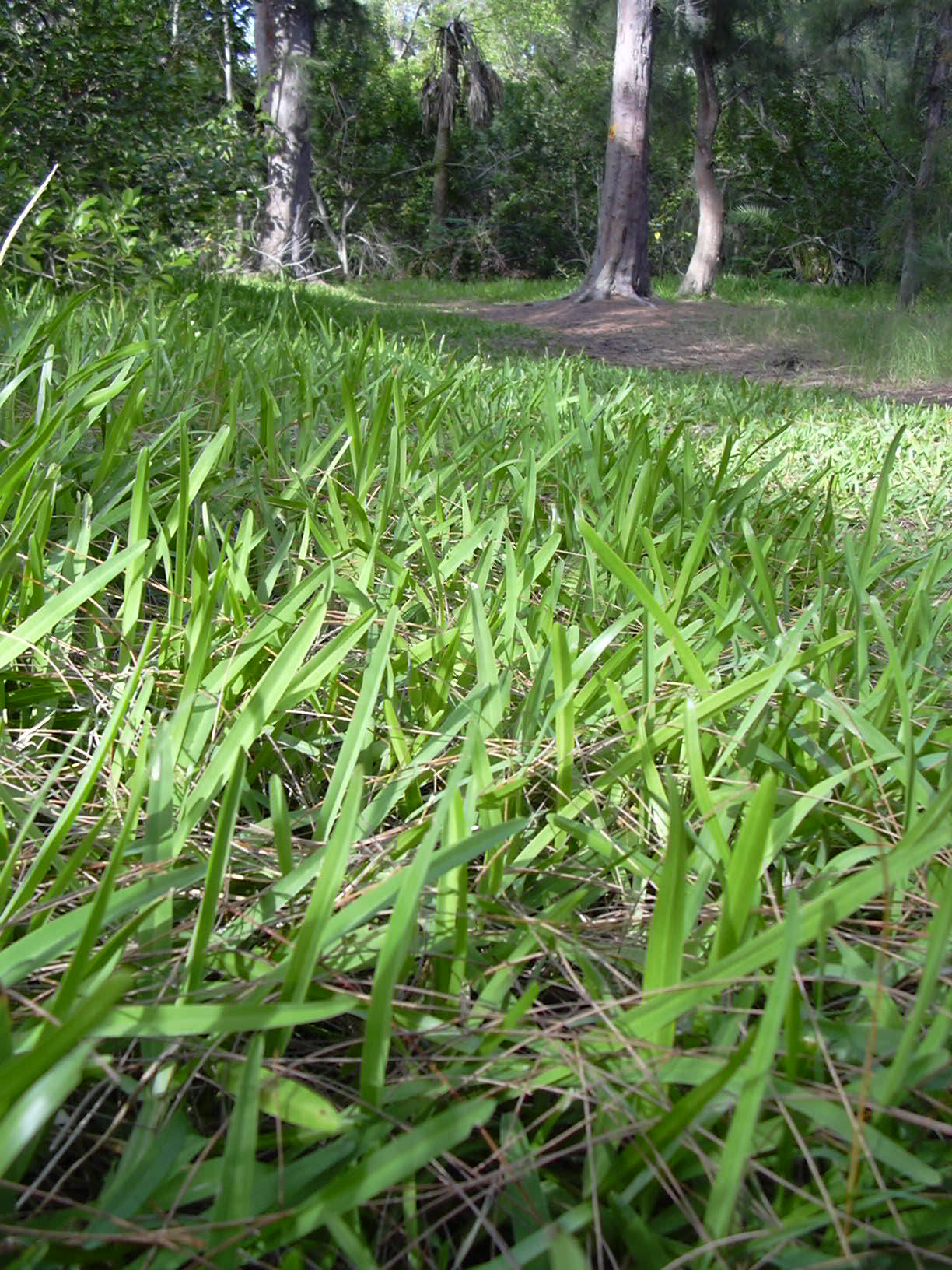
- St. Augustine grass (Stenotaphrum secundatum)

Scientific classification
- Kingdom: Plantae
- Clade: Tracheophytes
- Clade: Angiosperms
- Clade: Monocots
- Clade: Commelinids
- Order: Poales
- Family: Poaceae
- Subfamily: Panicoideae
- Supertribe: Panicodae
- Tribe: Paniceae
- Subtribe: Cenchrinae
- Genus: Stenotaphrum; Trin.

Type species
- Stenotaphrum glabrum (syn of S. dimidiatum) Trin.

Synonyms
- Diastemenanthe Desv.; Ophiurinella Desv.

= Stenotaphrum =

Genus of grasses

Stenotaphrum is a widespread genus of plants in the grass family.

The name is derived from the Greek words στενός (stenós), meaning "narrow", and τάφρος (táphros), meaning "trench". It refers to cavities in the raceme axis.

Species

- Stenotaphrum clavigerum Stapf – Aldabra Island and Assumption Island (both parts of Seychelles)
- Stenotaphrum dimidiatum (L.) Brongn. – Pembagrass – Tanzania, Mozambique, South Africa, Madagascar + other Indian Ocean islands, Indian subcontinent, Myanmar, Thailand, Pen Malaysia
- Stenotaphrum helferi Munro ex Hook.f. – Myanmar, Thailand, Pen Malaysia, Vietnam, Philippines, Fujian, Guangdong, Hainan, Yunnan
- Stenotaphrum micranthum (Desv.) C.E.Hubb – Tanzania, Queensland; various islands of Indian + Pacific Oceans + South China Sea
- Stenotaphrum oostachyum Baker – Madagascar
- Stenotaphrum secundatum (Walter) Kuntze – St. Augustine grass, Charleston grass, "buffalo grass" – Americas from Virginia + California to Uruguay
- Stenotaphrum unilaterale Baker – Madagascar

formerly included

see Parapholis

- Stenotaphrum compressum – Parapholis filiformis
