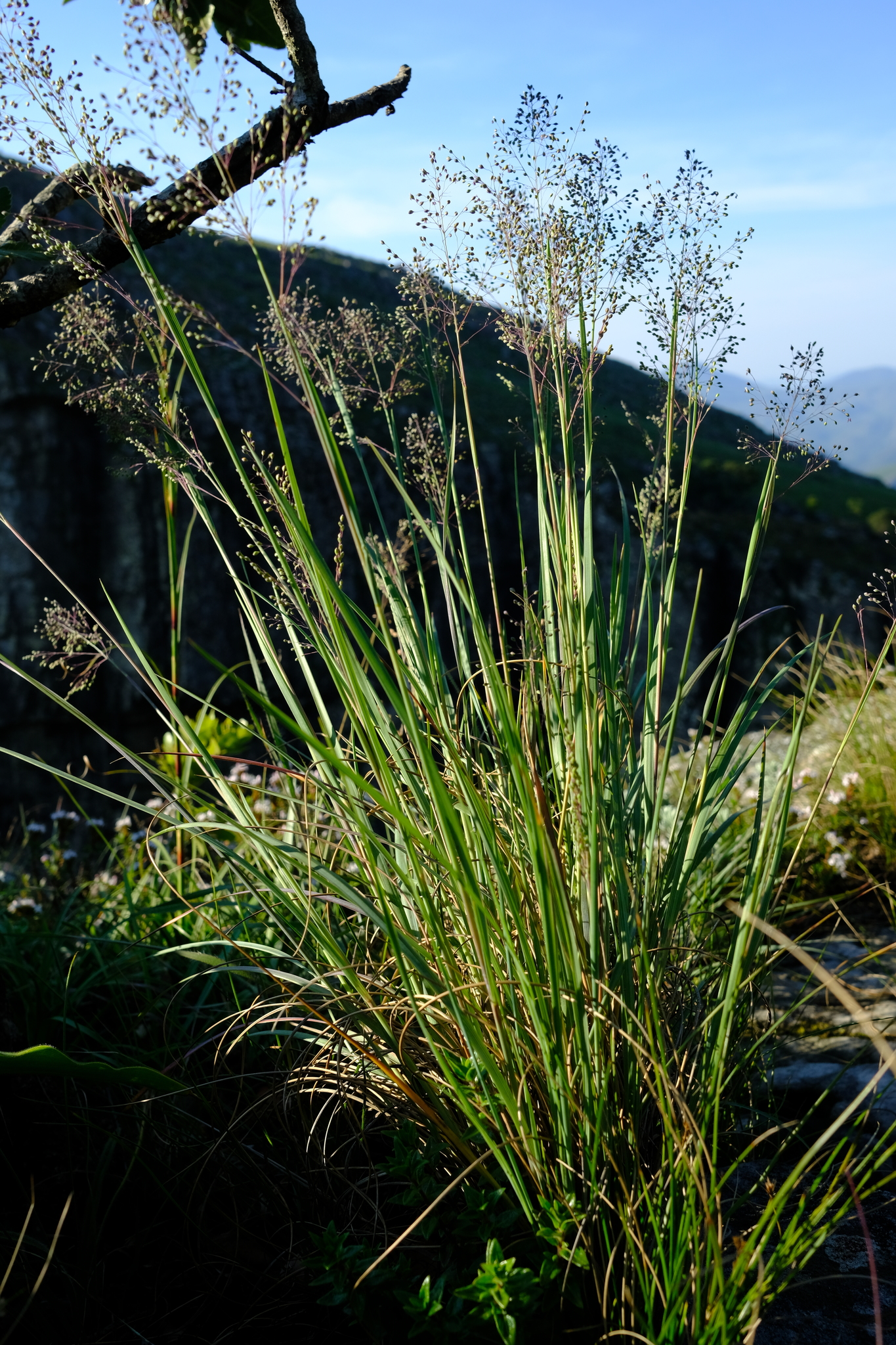
- Adenochloa ecklonii

Scientific classification
- Kingdom: Plantae
- Clade: Tracheophytes
- Clade: Angiosperms
- Clade: Monocots
- Clade: Commelinids
- Order: Poales
- Family: Poaceae
- Subfamily: Panicoideae
- Supertribe: Panicodae
- Tribe: Paniceae
- Subtribe: Dichantheliinae
- Genus: Adenochloa; Zuloaga

= Adenochloa =

Genus of flowering plants

Adenochloa is a genus of flowering plants belonging to the family Poaceae.

Its native range is Tropical and Southern Africa, Madagascar.

== Species ==
As of May 2023, the World Checklist of Selected Plant Families recognized thirteen species:

- Adenochloa adenophora (K.Schum.) Zuloaga
- Adenochloa bullockii (Renvoize) Zuloaga
- Adenochloa claytonii (Renvoize) Zuloaga
- Adenochloa ecklonii (Nees) Zuloaga
- Adenochloa flacciflora (Stapf) Zuloaga
- Adenochloa habrothrix (Renvoize) Zuloaga
- Adenochloa hymeniochila (Nees) Zuloaga
- Adenochloa lukwangulense (Pilg.) Zuloaga
- Adenochloa nigromarginata (Robyns) Zuloaga
- Adenochloa pectinella (Stapf) Zuloaga
- Adenochloa pole-evansii (C.E.Hubb.) Zuloaga
- Adenochloa sadinii (Vanderyst) Zuloaga
- Adenochloa squarrosa (Peter) Zuloaga
