= Paratheria =

Scientific classification
- Kingdom: Plantae
- Clade: Tracheophytes
- Clade: Angiosperms
- Clade: Monocots
- Clade: Commelinids
- Order: Poales
- Family: Poaceae
- Subfamily: Panicoideae
- Supertribe: Panicodae
- Tribe: Paniceae
- Subtribe: Cenchrinae
- Genus: Paratheria; Griseb.

Type species
- Paratheria prostrata Griseb.

Genus of grasses

Paratheria is a genus of African and Caribbean plants in the grass family.

Species

- Paratheria glaberrima C.E.Hubb. – Sierra Leone, Republic of the Congo
- Paratheria prostrata Griseb. – Sub-Saharan Africa from Senegal to Ethiopia to Namibia and Madagascar; Costa Rica, Cuba, Hispaniola, Colombia, Venezuela, Guyana, French Guiana, Bolivia, Brazil
