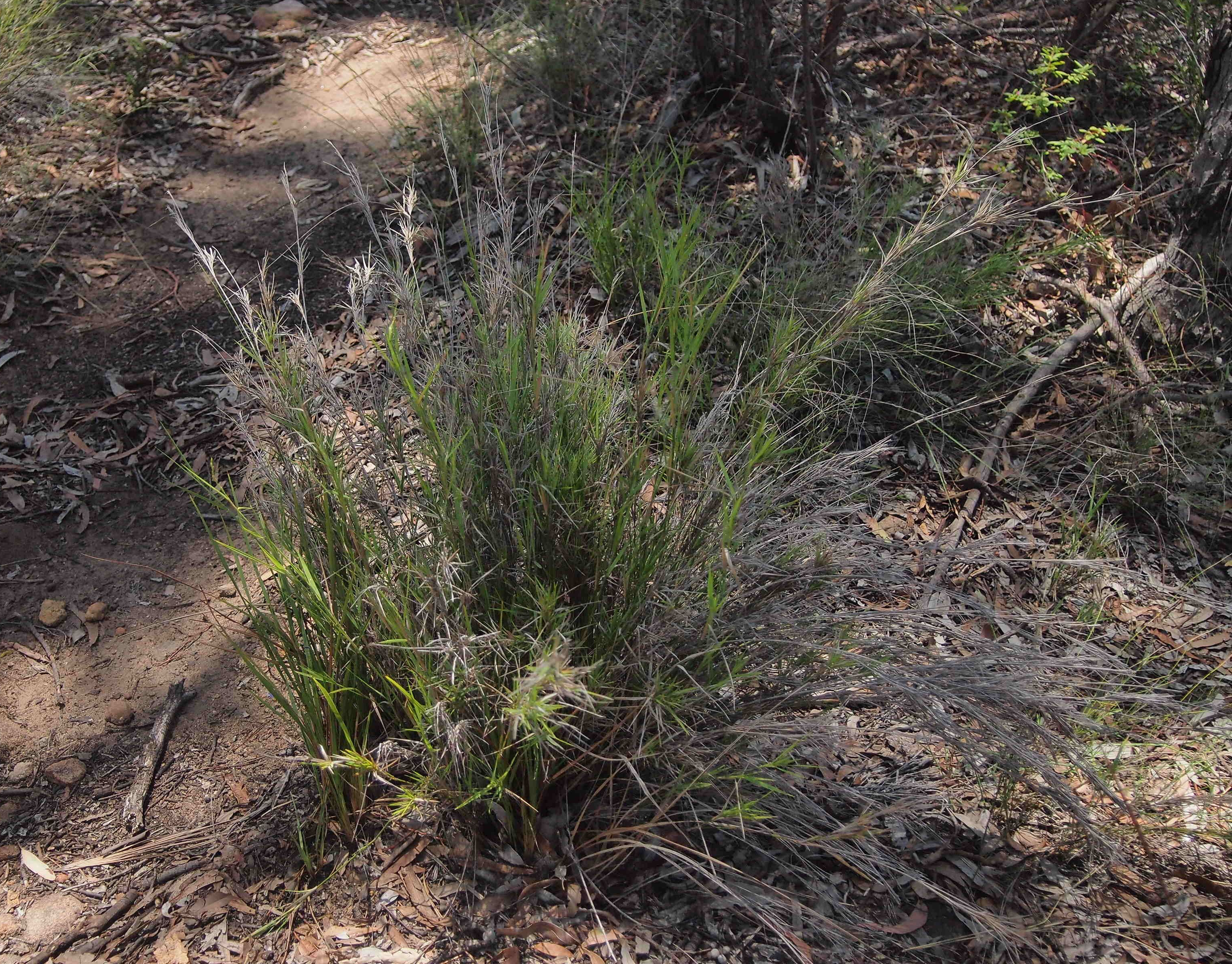

Scientific classification
- Kingdom: Plantae
- Clade: Tracheophytes
- Clade: Angiosperms
- Clade: Monocots
- Clade: Commelinids
- Order: Poales
- Family: Poaceae
- Subfamily: Panicoideae
- Supertribe: Panicodae
- Tribe: Paniceae
- Genus: Dimorphochloa; S.T.Blake
- Species: D. rigida

Binomial name
- Dimorphochloa rigida S.T.Blake

Synonyms
- Cleistochloa rigida (S.T.Blake) Clayton

= Dimorphochloa =

Genus of grasses

Dimorphochloa is a genus of grasses. It contains a single species, Dimorphochloa rigida, a perennial native to New South Wales and Queensland in eastern Australia.
