= Poecilostachys =

Scientific classification
- Kingdom: Plantae
- Clade: Tracheophytes
- Clade: Angiosperms
- Clade: Monocots
- Clade: Commelinids
- Order: Poales
- Family: Poaceae
- Subfamily: Panicoideae
- Supertribe: Panicodae
- Tribe: Paniceae
- Subtribe: Boivinellinae
- Genus: Poecilostachys; Hack.

Type species
- Poecilostachys hildebrandtii Hack.

Synonyms
- Chloachne Stapf

Genus of grasses

Poecilostachys is a genus of African plants in the grass family, several of the species found only in Madagascar.

Species

- Poecilostachys ambositrensis A.Camus
- Poecilostachys bakeri (Schinz) C.E.Hubb.
- Poecilostachys baronis Stapf
- Poecilostachys confertiflora A.Camus
- Poecilostachys geminata (Baker) Hack.
- Poecilostachys hildebrandtii Hack.
- Poecilostachys humbertii A.Camus
- Poecilostachys mainborondroensis A.Camus
- Poecilostachys manongarivensis A.Camus
- Poecilostachys marojejyensis A.Camus
- Poecilostachys mollis Stapf
- Poecilostachys muscicola A.Camus
- Poecilostachys oplismenoides (Hack.) Clayton
- Poecilostachys tsaratananensis A.Camus
- Poecilostachys viguieri A.Camus

formerly included

see Oplismenus

- Poecilostachys stapfii - Oplismenus flavicomus
