= Cenchrus pennisetiformis =

Conservation status
- Least Concern (IUCN 3.1)

Scientific classification
- Kingdom: Plantae
- Clade: Tracheophytes
- Clade: Angiosperms
- Clade: Monocots
- Clade: Commelinids
- Order: Poales
- Family: Poaceae
- Subfamily: Panicoideae
- Genus: Cenchrus
- Species: C. pennisetiformis

Binomial name
- Cenchrus pennisetiformis Steud.

Synonyms
- Cenchrus lappaceus Tausch; Cenchrus echinoides Wight ex Steud.; Cenchrus rigidifolius Fig. & De Not.; Cenchrus pennisetiformis var. brevisetosus Courbon; Cenchrus digynus Ehrenb. ex Boiss.; Pennisetum cenchroides var. hamphilahense A.Terracc.; Pennisetum ciliare var. hamphilahense (A.Terracc.) T.Durand & Schinz; Pennisetum cenchroides var. echinoides Hook.f.; Cenchrus pennisetiformis var. rigidifolius (Fig. & De Not.) Chiov.; Cenchrus ciliaris f. rigidifolius (Fig. & De Not.) Chiov.; Cenchrus ciliaris var. pennisetiformis (Steud.) Chiov. ex Pirotta; Cenchrus aequiglumis Chiov.; Cenchrus pennisetiformis subsp. glabratus Chrtek & Osb.-Kos.; Pennisetum pennisetiforme (Steud.) Wipff

Species of grass

Cenchrus pennisetiformis, commonly known in Australia as the Cloncurry, white or slender buffel grass, is a species of grass in the genus Cenchrus. It is native to parts of East Africa, the Arabian Peninsula and the Indian subcontinent, and has been introduced to some other parts of the world as a drought-tolerant forage crop.

== Description ==
Cenchrus pennisetiformis is an annual or perennial bunchgrass, sometimes spreading by means of stolons. The stems are sometimes branched and are up to 70 cm (28 in) high. The leaf blades are flat, 3 to 20 cm (1 to 8 in) long by 2 to 5 mm (0.1 to 0.2 in) wide, and the inflorescences 2 to 10 cm (1 to 4 in) long by 6 to 9 mm (0.24 to 0.35 in) wide, not including the soft bristles. The outer bristles are short and slender and the inner ones rather broader and some 7 to 15 mm (0.3 to 0.6 in) long.

== Distribution ==
Cenchrus pennisetiformis is native to East Africa where it is found in Sudan, Ethiopia, Somalia and Kenya, and to western Asia, where it occurs in Southern Iran, Yemen, India and Pakistan. It is naturalised in northwestern Australia, where it has spread along the banks of watercourses replacing native species of grass. It is also found in the Mediterranean region, Myanmar and Sri Lanka, although it is unclear whether it is native to these areas or has been naturalised.

== Cultivation and use ==
C. pennisetiformis is a grass suited to growing in arid and semi-arid environments because it remains green and palatable even in the dry season. It grows best on light sandy or silty soils, in either full sun or partial shade, but cannot tolerate heavy, cracking clays. It can withstand moderate frosts and will survive temporary flooding.

In Pakistan there are areas with very low rainfall (under 12 cm (5 in) annually), saline soils and a shortage of water for irrigation. Several species of grasses including C. pennisetiformis, Diplachne fusca, Panicum turgidum and Pennisetum divisum are able to provide good grazing for livestock and even dairy enterprises in these areas. Research has shown that C. pennisetiformis and P. turgidum produce the most forage under drought conditions, and are able to tolerate moderate levels of salinity in the subsoil groundwater, and irrigation with this brackish water.
