= Sand burr =

Sand burr is a common name for several plants and may refer to:

- Cenchrus, a grass
- Xanthium, a broad-leaved plant

== See also ==
Sand bur
