= Cenchrus setosus =

Scientific classification
- Kingdom: Plantae
- Clade: Embryophytes
- Clade: Tracheophytes
- Clade: Angiosperms
- Clade: Monocots
- Clade: Commelinids
- Order: Poales
- Family: Poaceae
- Subfamily: Panicoideae
- Genus: Cenchrus
- Species: C. setosus

Binomial name
- Cenchrus setosus Sw. (1788)

Synonyms
- Pennisetum polystachion auct. non (L.) Schult.

Species of plant

Cenchrus setosus, the feathery pennisetum, is a species of grass in the family Poaceae, first described in Prodr. Veg. Ind. Occ. (1788). It is native to Africa, the Arabian Peninsula, and South and Southeast Asia, extending from India to Indo-China, and has been widely introduced to tropical and subtropical regions across the Americas, Pacific Islands, and parts of Asia. It is sometimes cultivated as a pasture or fodder grass. Distinguishing features include the soft, crinkled hairs surrounding the spikelet and the deciduous upper floret, which serve as diagnostic characters for identification.
