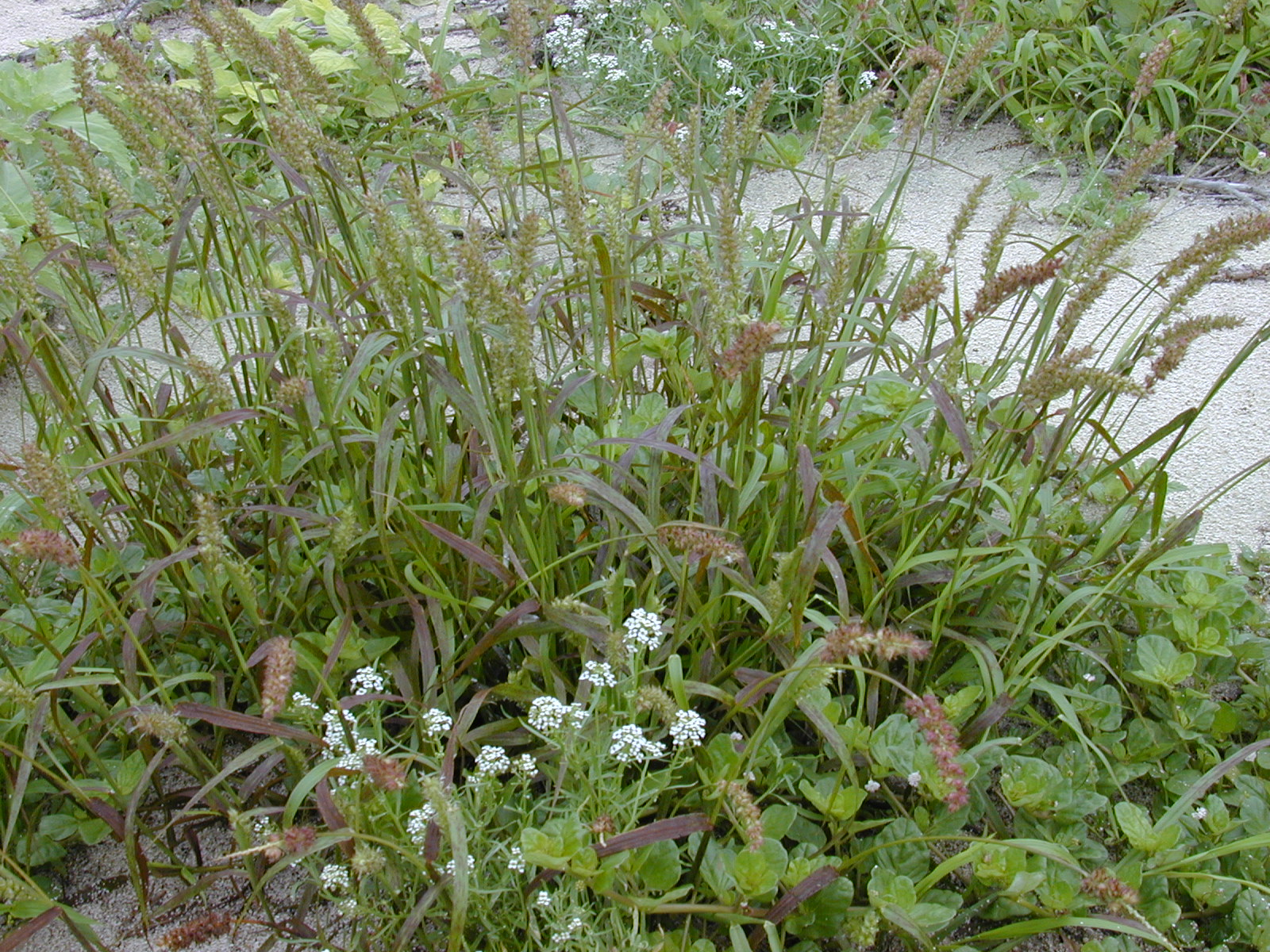
- On Kure Atoll

Conservation status
- Least Concern (IUCN 3.1)

Scientific classification
- Kingdom: Plantae
- Clade: Tracheophytes
- Clade: Angiosperms
- Clade: Monocots
- Clade: Commelinids
- Order: Poales
- Family: Poaceae
- Subfamily: Panicoideae
- Genus: Cenchrus
- Species: C. echinatus

Binomial name
- Cenchrus echinatus L.

Synonyms
- Cenchrus cavanillesii Tausch; Panicastrella muricata Moench; Cenchrus brevisetus E.Fourn. ex Hemsl.; Cenchrus crinitus Mez; Cenchrus hillebrandianus Hitchc.; Cenchrus insularis Scribn.; Cenchrus pungens Kunth

= Cenchrus echinatus =

Species of plant

Cenchrus echinatus is a species of grass known by the common names southern sandbur, spiny sandbur, southern sandspur, and in Australia, Mossman River grass. It is native to North and South America. It is a clump-forming annual grass growing up to 80 cm (31 in) tall. The leaves occur with or without hairs and measure up to 12 mm (0.47 in) wide. The ligule is a fringe of hairs. The grass has barbed burrs of 4–10 mm (0.16–0.39 in) long.

In Australia it forms an invasive weed in coastal situations.

== Ecology ==
The species is invasive in New Caledonia, Tahiti, and Rarotonga.

== Gallery ==
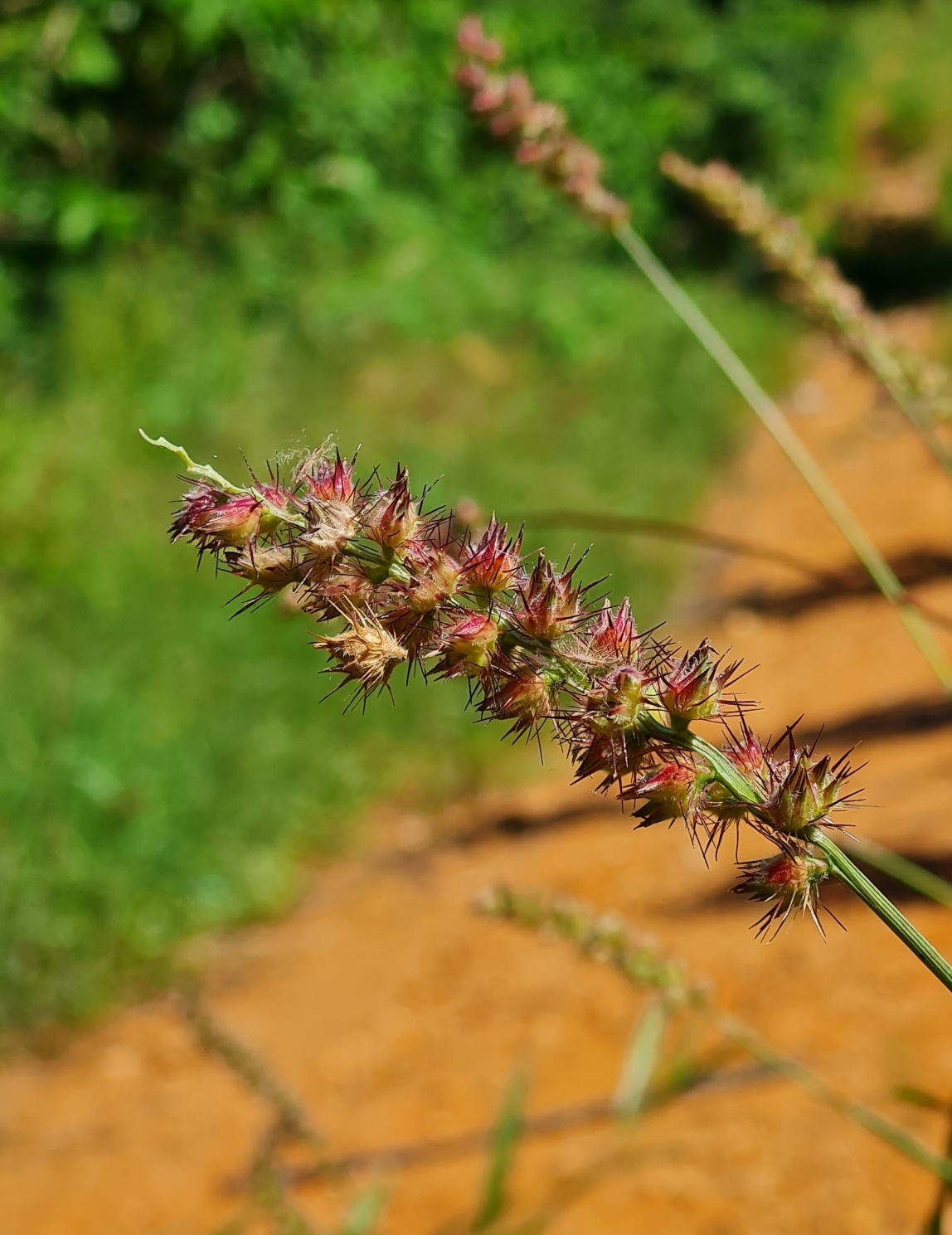
In Brazil

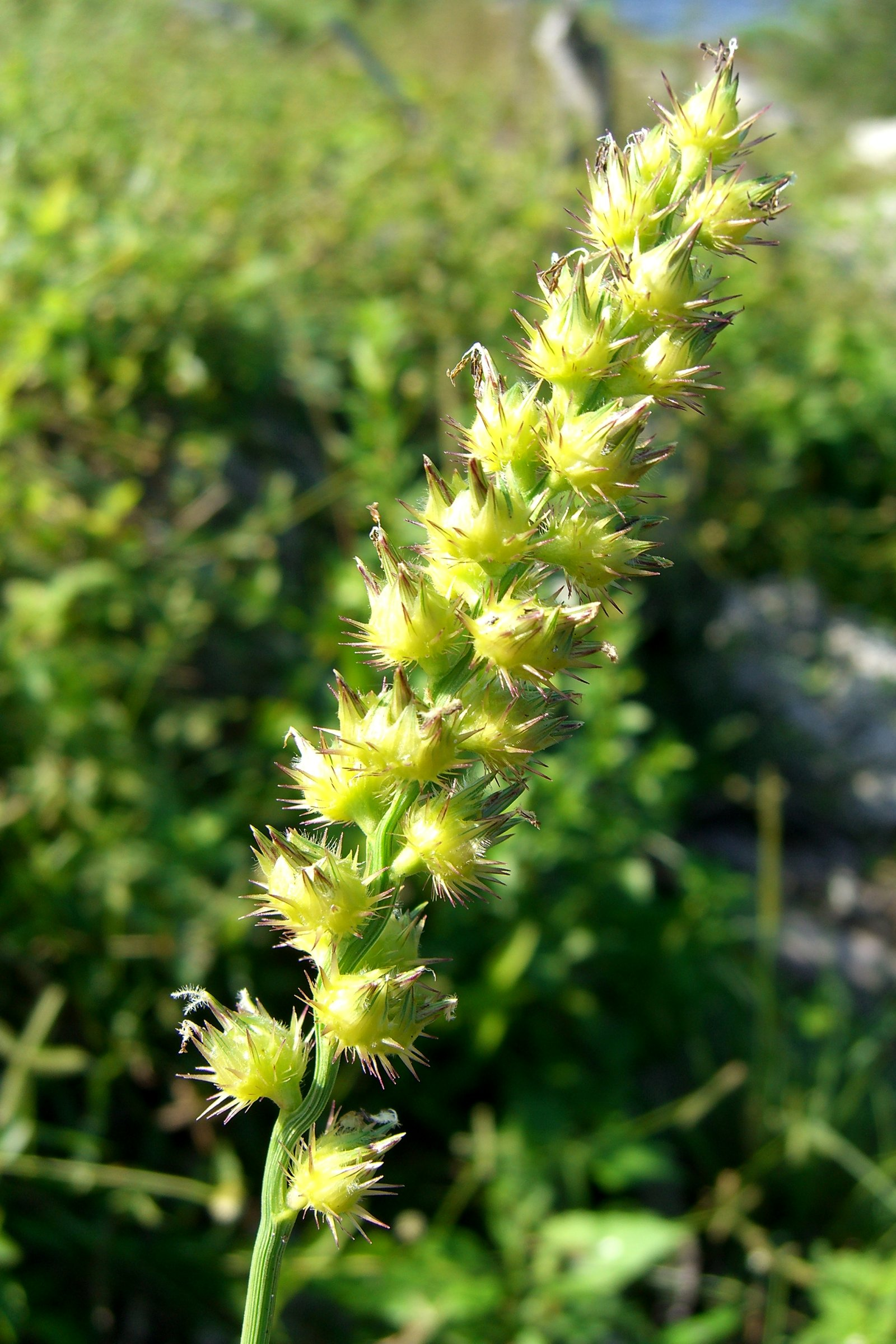
In the Florida Keys

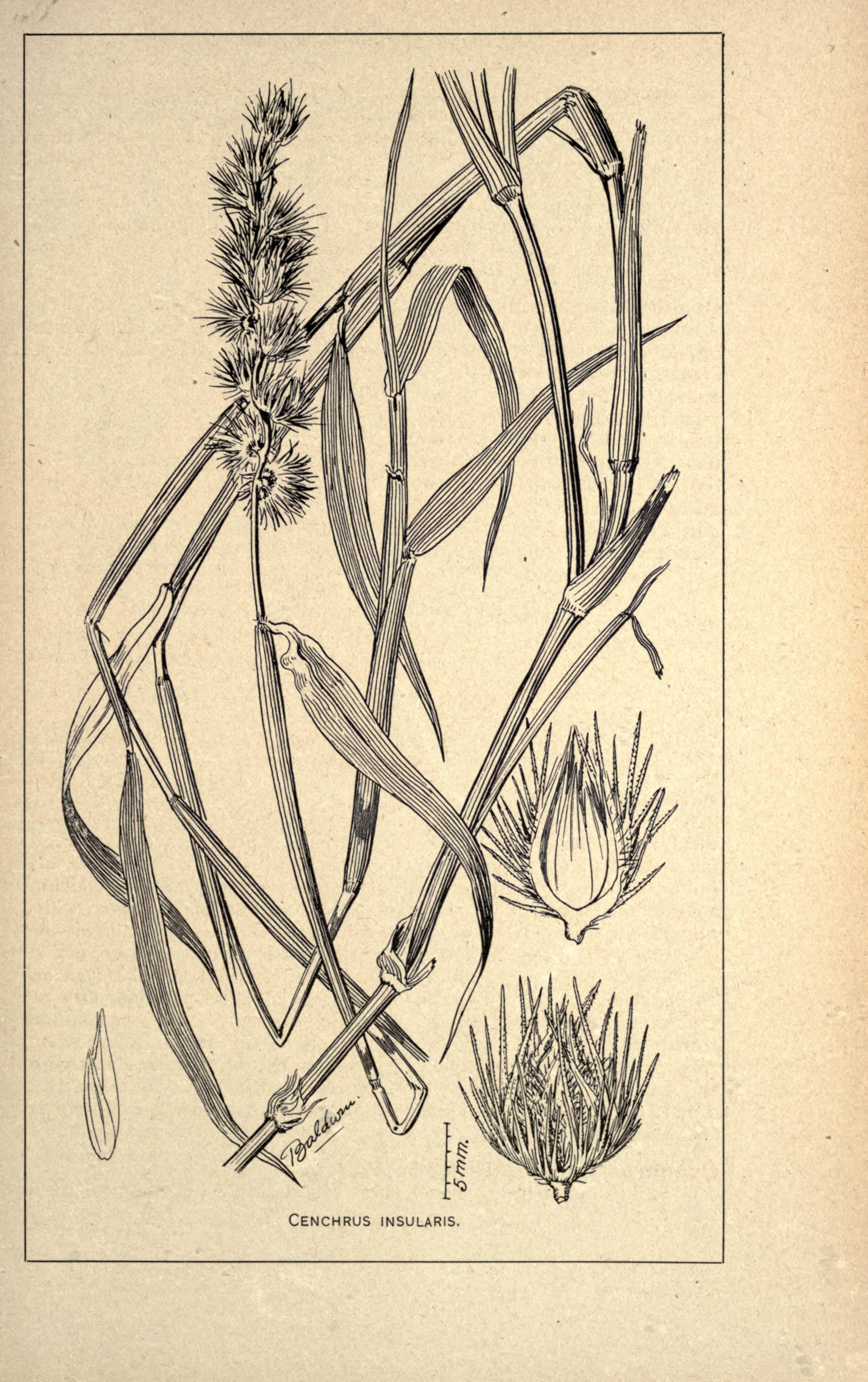
Illustration
