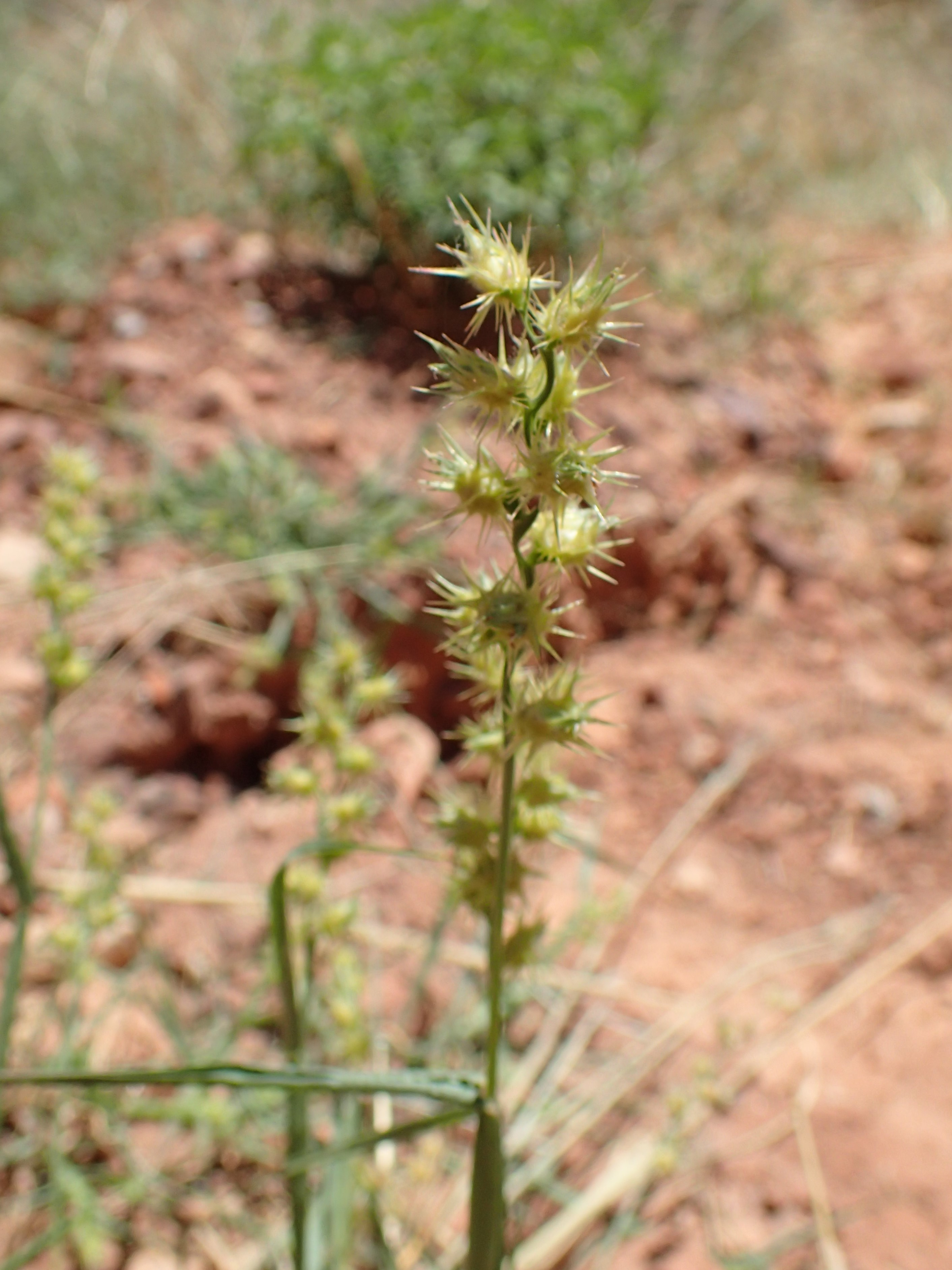

Scientific classification
- Kingdom: Plantae
- Clade: Tracheophytes
- Clade: Angiosperms
- Clade: Monocots
- Clade: Commelinids
- Order: Poales
- Family: Poaceae
- Subfamily: Panicoideae
- Genus: Cenchrus
- Species: C. longispinus

Binomial name
- Cenchrus longispinus (Hack.) Fern.

Synonyms
- Cenchrus echinatus f. longispinus Hack.; Cenchrus echinatus var. longispinus (Hack.) Jansen & Wacht.; Cenchrus pauciflorus var. longispinus (Hack.) Jansen & Wacht.

= Cenchrus longispinus =

Species of flowering plant

Cenchrus longispinus is a species of grass, also known as spiny burr grass or gentle Annie or picco. Its fruits are clumped into "burrs" with sharp, barbed spines that can penetrate the hides and mouth of grazing animals. They can also become lodged in human clothing and skin, causing some discomfort. This activity is important for the plant's seed dispersal, as the plant is a summer annual. The species has a prostrate habit when there is no competition for light.

The species is native to North America and is considered as a noxious weed in Europe, Australia and New Zealand where it was introduced.
