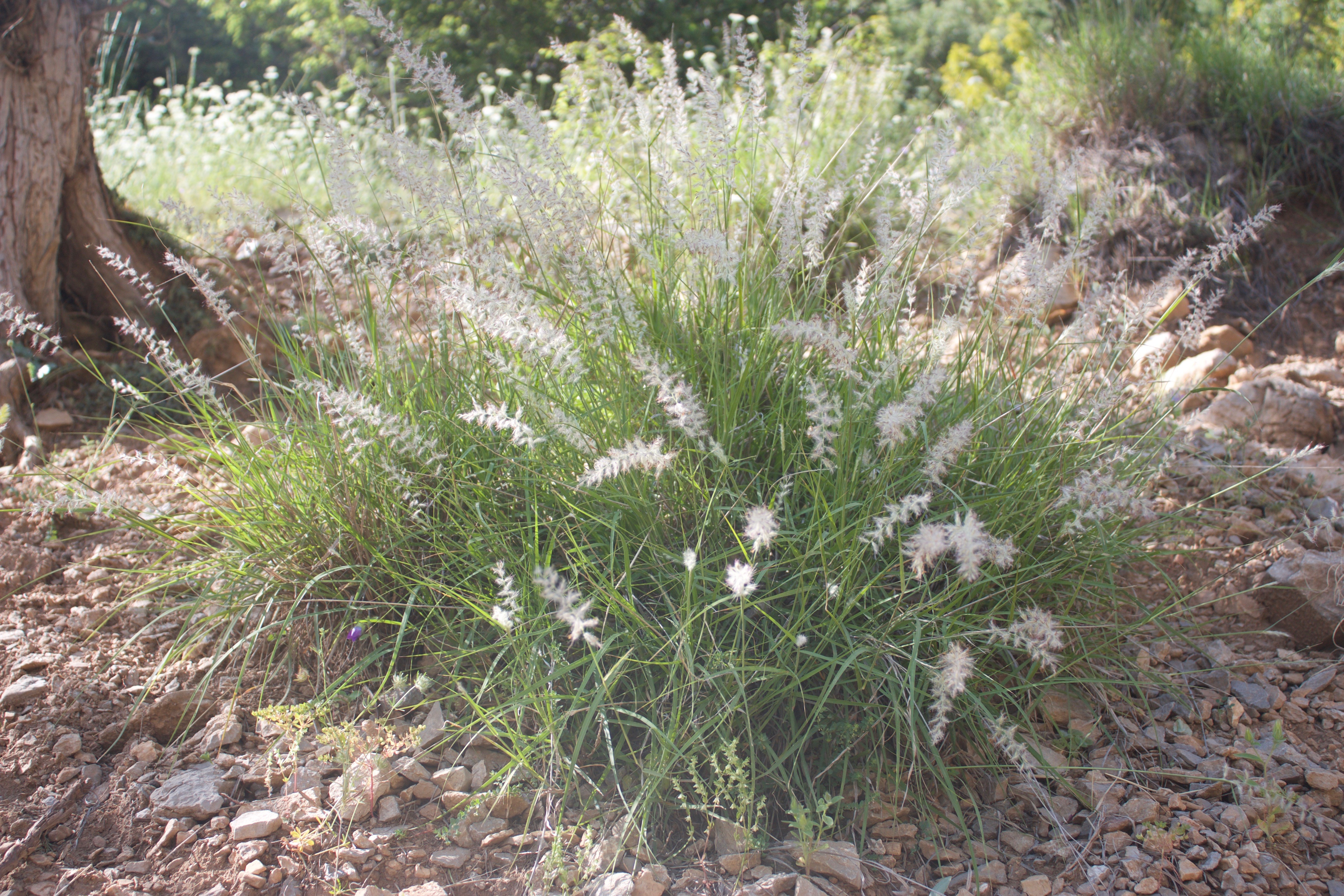

Scientific classification
- Kingdom: Plantae
- Clade: Tracheophytes
- Clade: Angiosperms
- Clade: Monocots
- Clade: Commelinids
- Order: Poales
- Family: Poaceae
- Subfamily: Panicoideae
- Genus: Cenchrus
- Species: C. orientalis

Binomial name
- Cenchrus orientalis (Rich.) Morrone

Synonyms
- Pennisetum orientale Rich.

= Cenchrus orientalis =

Species of grass

Cenchrus orientale, previously Pennisetum orientale, commonly known as the oriental fountain grass, is a species of flowering plant in the grass family Poaceae, native to North West Asia and North Africa. Growing to 60 cm (24 in) tall and broad, this decorative perennial grass forms clumps with multiple tufted panicles up to 14 cm (5.5 in) in length. The panicles are pale pink, maturing to brown.

The plant is not entirely hardy, disliking prolonged freezing temperatures. In cultivation it requires a sheltered position and some winter protection in colder areas. It has gained the Royal Horticultural Society's Award of Garden Merit.
