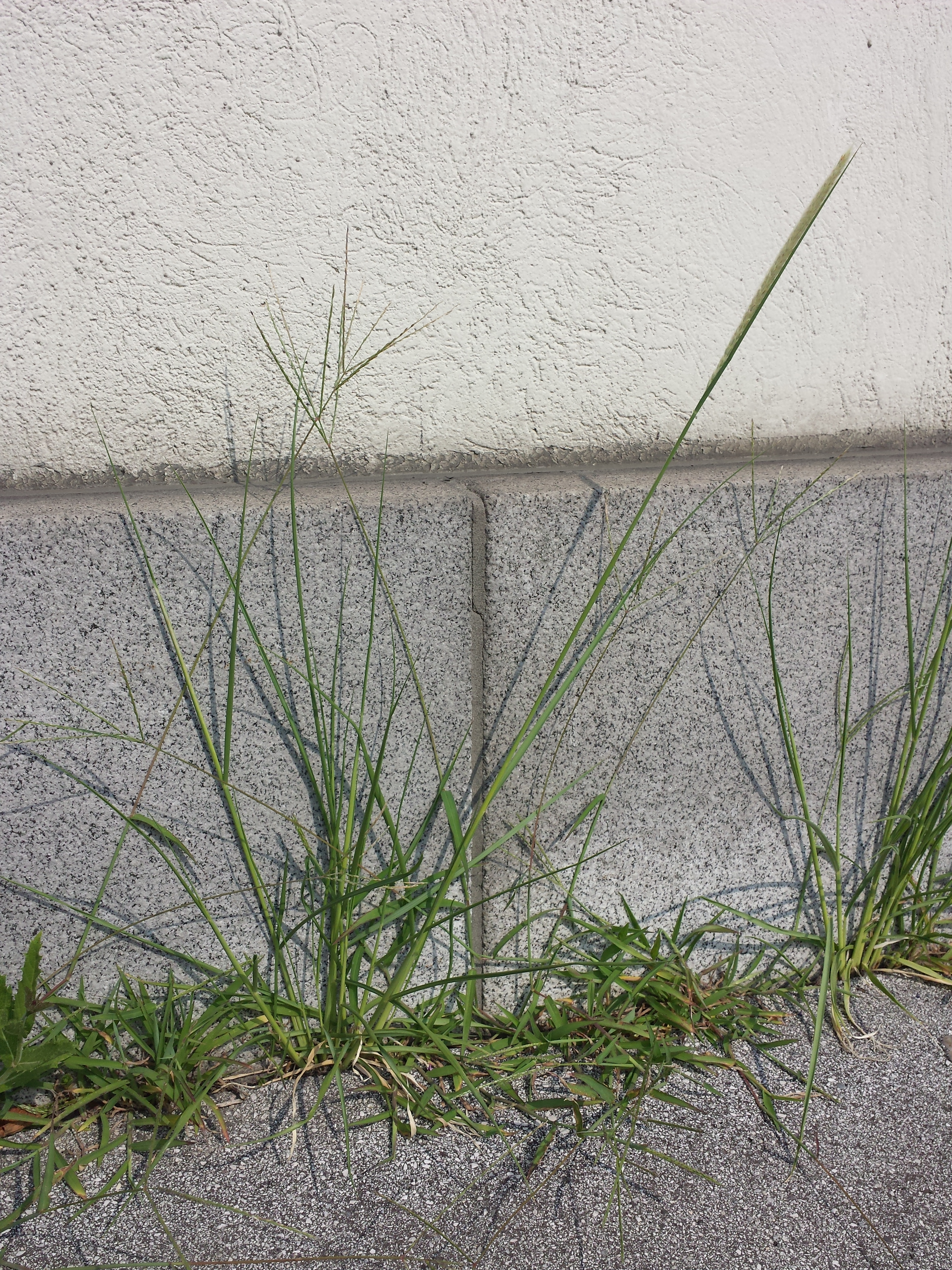
- In Vienna

Scientific classification
- Kingdom: Plantae
- Clade: Embryophytes
- Clade: Tracheophytes
- Clade: Spermatophytes
- Clade: Angiosperms
- Clade: Monocots
- Clade: Commelinids
- Order: Poales
- Family: Poaceae
- Subfamily: Panicoideae
- Genus: Cenchrus
- Species: C. caudatus

Binomial name
- Cenchrus caudatus (Schrad.) Kuntze

Synonyms
- Pennisetum macrourum; Gymnotrix caudata

= Cenchrus caudatus =

Southern African and Arabian plant

Cenchrus caudatus, (or Pennisetum macrourum), commonly known as African feather grass, is a C4 perennial bunch grass native to tropical and southern Africa, extending to the Arabian Peninsula.

== Description ==
Cenchrus caudatus is characterized by its feathery awns and robust growth form. It is a rhizomatous geophyte.

== Range ==
The species is indigenous to the tropical and southern regions of Africa, with its range extending to the Arabian Peninsula. It has been introduced to other regions, including Austria, California, the Canary Islands, Great Britain, Hawaii, New Zealand (North and South islands), Saint Helena, Tasmania, and Texas.

== Habitat ==
The species prefers open, sunny locations and is tolerant of a variety of soil conditions. It can be found in open grasslands, woodlands, along rivers, and in areas disturbed by human activities, including waste spaces.
