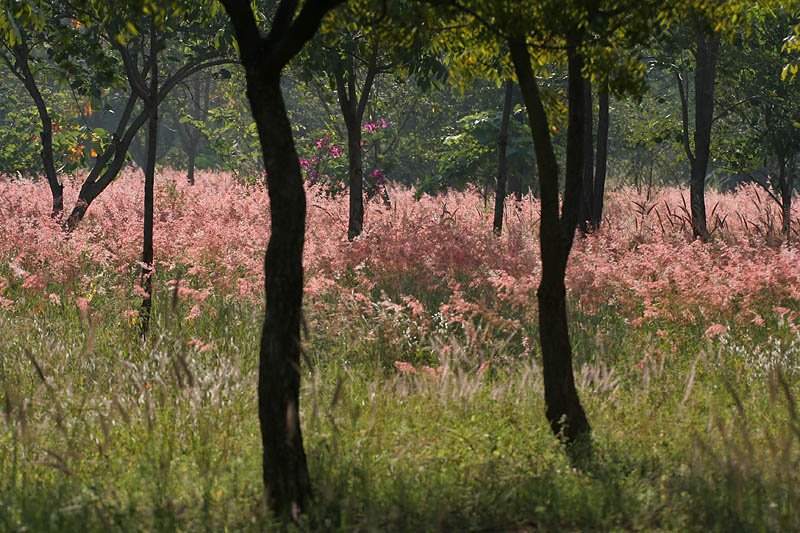

Scientific classification
- Kingdom: Plantae
- Clade: Tracheophytes
- Clade: Angiosperms
- Clade: Monocots
- Clade: Commelinids
- Order: Poales
- Family: Poaceae
- Subfamily: Panicoideae
- Genus: Cenchrus
- Species: C. pedicellatus

Binomial name
- Cenchrus pedicellatus (Trin.) Morrone

Synonyms
- Pennisetum pedicellatum Trin.

= Cenchrus pedicellatus =

Species of grass

Cenchrus pedicellatus, previously Pennisetum pedicellatum, known simply as desho or as desho grass, is an indigenous grass of Ethiopia of the monocot angiosperm plant family Poaceae. It is also known as annual kyasuwa grass in Nigeria, bare in Mauritania, and deenanath grass in India. It grows in its native geographic location, naturally spreading across the escarpment of the Ethiopian highlands. Widely available in this location, it is ideal for livestock feed and can be sustainably cultivated on small plots of land. Thus desho is becoming increasingly utilized, along with various soil and water conservation techniques, as a local method of improving grazing land management and combating a growing productivity problem of the local region.

== Description ==
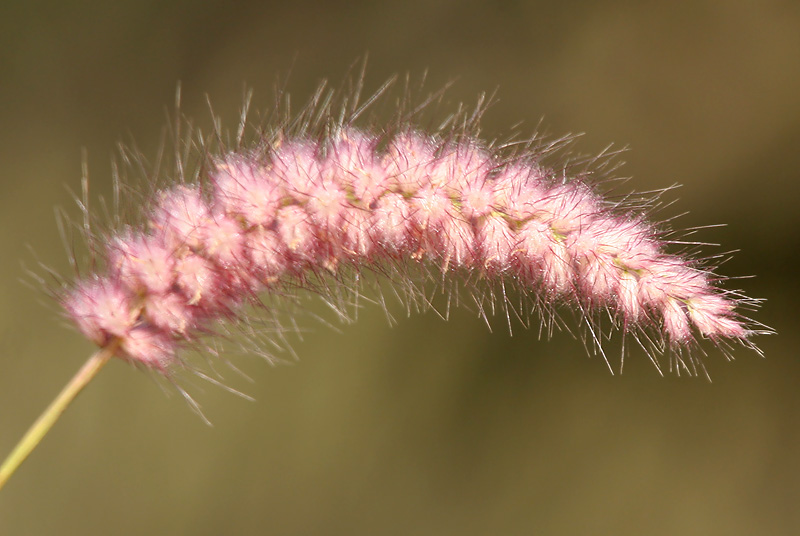
Flower

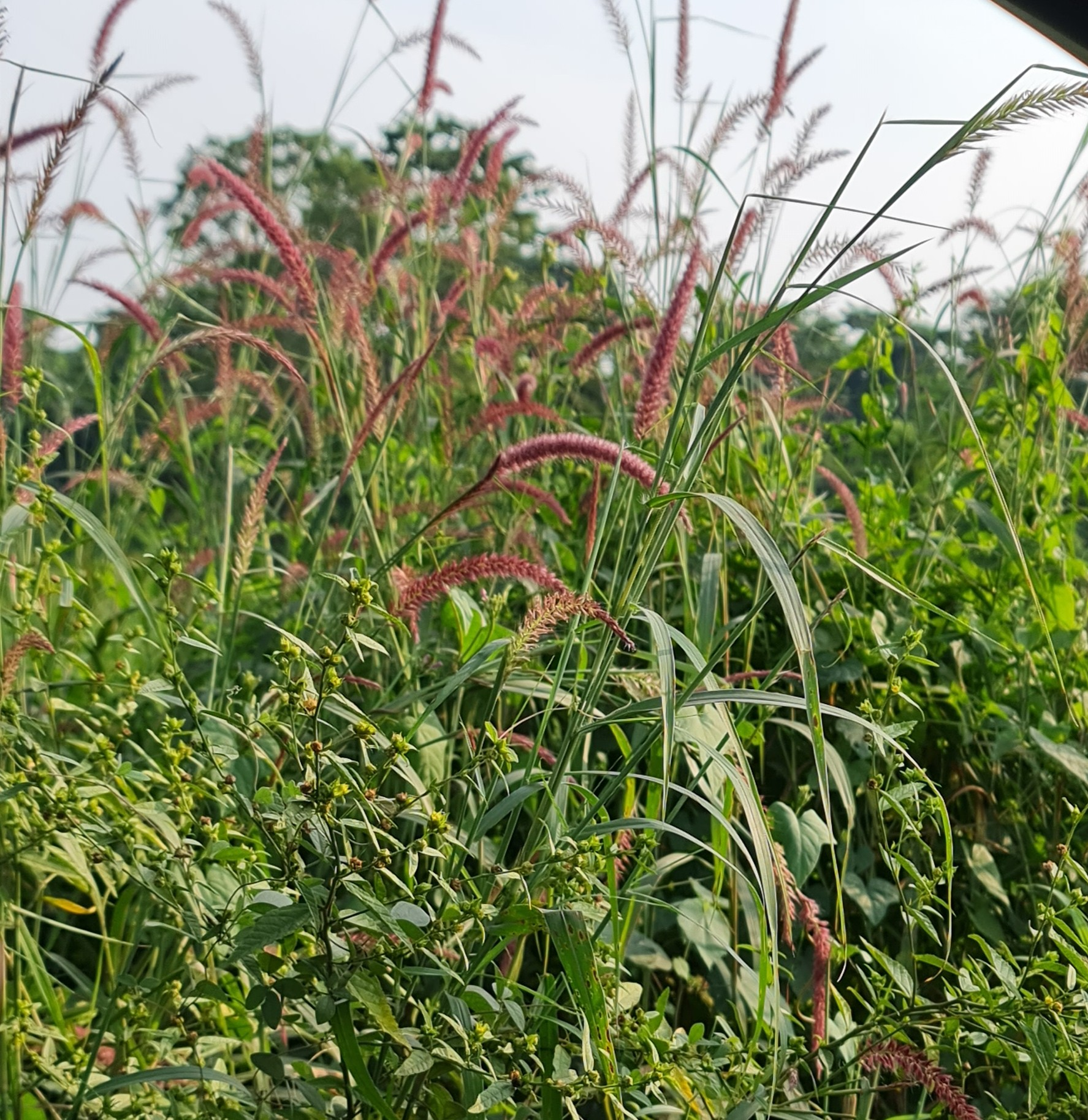
Cenchrus pedicellatus growing in the wild

Desho is a herbaceous perennial grass which has a massive root system that anchors to the soil. It has a high biomass producing capacity and grows upright with the potential of reaching 90 cm to 120 cm in height depending on soil fertility. Desho is planted by cuts which have good survival rates and establish better compared to grasses planted by seed. Moreover, desho grows rapidly and is drought resistant once established. Desho is said to have high nutritive values and is naturally palatable for livestock.

== Geography ==
Desho is native to the humid Ethiopian highlands. It was discovered as a species in 1991 in the Chencha district of the southern region of Ethiopia. It can grow anywhere from 1500–2800 m above sea level, but it performs best at elevations higher than 1700 m above sea level.

== Growing conditions ==
The technical specifications for cultivating desho are essential to improve grazing land management practices. Cuts of the grass are ideally planted in rows, spaced at 10 cm by 10 cm, using a hand hoe. This spacing gives each plant sufficient soil nutrients and access to sunlight to achieve optimal growth, while ensuring the soil will be completely covered by the grass once established. It is recommended to plant other species alongside desho to promote biodiversity. Multipurpose shrubs/trees, for example Leucaena sp and Sesbania sp, can be planted approximately 5 m apart with no particular layout. Other legumes, such as alfalfa and clover, can be mixed in with desho by being broadcast throughout the plot.

Once planted, maintenance activities such as applying fertilizer, weeding and gap filling, ensure proper establishment and persistence of desho. Fertilizer should be applied throughout the plot one month after planting. It is recommended to use organic compost in the form of animal manure, leaf litter, wood ash, food scraps, and/or any other rich biodegradable matters. After this initial treatment, fertilizer is only applied sporadically when desho plants are struggling to grow or where replanting has taken place. Weeding and gap filling are continuous activities. However, after 2 to 3 years, maintenance inputs decrease substantially or cease altogether as the grass cover closes up and the plot becomes a sustainable fodder source.

Past interventions have shown that desho based grazing land management practices are best implemented and established when communal grazing land is distributed into small plots (less than 0.5 ha) for individuals to use, develop and manage.

== Uses ==
Desho is used as a year round fodder. To maintain the sustainability of the intervention, the plot is permanently made inaccessible to free grazing livestock; instead a cut-and-carry system is encouraged. Cut-and-carry means that desho is harvested and brought to livestock for stall-feeding. Due to its rapid growth rate, desho provides regular harvests, even reaching monthly cuts during the rainy reason. Once a year, just before the dry season, sufficient grass is harvested and stored as hay to feed the livestock until the rains return.

One study assessed the effectiveness of another use for desho, the use of desho as grass strips, or hedgerows, to protect against runoff and soil loss on the slopes on the Ethiopian highlands. The results of the study showed that desho grass strips reduce soil loss by approximately 45% in the first few years of establishment compared to areas with no barriers. However, vetiver grass was found to be more effective than desho, and thus vetiver should be used as the preferred grass for hedgerow technology.

== Environmental impacts ==
The desho grazing land management intervention has significant positive impacts on the natural environment, particularly when biodiversity is improved. Desho is used as a rehabilitation method to overcome land degradation caused by overpopulation and unsustainable farming practices. Desho greatly improves ground cover, which in turn controls runoff and soil loss. Moreover its massive root system strengthens the soil structure and improves water conservation capacities while effectively using deeper nutrients for growth.

The application of trees and legumes alongside desho improves soil fertility by regenerating critical nutrients such as fixed nitrogen from legumes. However, most important for land rehabilitation is the change from overgrazing to silvopasture practices (combining forestry with grazing).

In Ethiopian agriculture, livestock production plays a fundamental role for the livelihood of the people. Due to rapid population growth in the Ethiopian highlands, traditional communal grazing areas are increasingly being fragmented into cropland to meet growing demand. In turn, massive pressure is placed on remaining grazing land as overstocking cow and oxen leads to overgrazing and land degradation. This pattern negatively affects agricultural productivity and places a direct threat on the livelihoods of local farmers. Implementing desho with silvopasture methods, such as cut-and-carry and biodiversity systems, protects grazing land from further degradation while increasing its productivity, and consequently improving livestock production.

== Economics ==
The desho grazing land management intervention has significant positive impacts on the livelihoods of Ethiopian farmers. Ethiopia has the largest livestock population is Africa. Livestock production accounts for approximately 40% of the average household income of an Ethiopian farmer. Therefore, the increase in grazing land productivity leads to the increase in fodder (desho) production, due to high and consistent good quality yields, and consequently creates an increase in livestock production. The commercialisation and marketing of the animals and their by products then increases the cash income of the farmer and their family.

Desho also provides a small business opportunity for Ethiopians. Various studies have shown that fodder is the key limiting factor influencing the growth of the commercial livestock production sector in Ethiopia as there is a critical shortage of consistent quality fodder. Thus, the development of efficient and sustainable for-profit desho plots and nurseries could be a good business model with the goal of selling the desho materials to local farmers. If fodder demands are met, commercial livestock production of the region could be promoted, raising the livelihoods of farmers and bringing more economic opportunity to the region.

== Disadvantages of wider adoption ==
Wider adoption of desho is prevented by the inputs required. To start, the tools and cuts needed for planting require high cash inputs relative to that of free grazing. Moreover, fertilizers are needed for the proper establishment of desho, which are extremely costly under Ethiopian conditions, unless organic compost is used. Finally, the implementation, establishment and maintenance of desho require intensive labour, particularly in the initial stages of implementation and establishment. However, the advantages of using a local sustainable technology seem to outweigh the disadvantages, as the spontaneous adoption of desho-based grazing land management has been very high among farmers in the highlands of Ethiopia.
