= Cenchrus riparius =

Scientific classification
- Kingdom: Plantae
- Clade: Embryophytes
- Clade: Tracheophytes
- Clade: Angiosperms
- Clade: Monocots
- Clade: Commelinids
- Order: Poales
- Family: Poaceae
- Subfamily: Panicoideae
- Genus: Cenchrus
- Species: C. riparius

Binomial name
- Cenchrus riparius (Hochst. ex A.Rich.) Morrone

Synonyms
- Pennisetum riparium Hochst. ex A.Rich.

Species of tropical grass

Cenchrus riparius, or previously Pennisetum riparium, is a species of perennial tropical grass in the family Poaceae, native to Ethiopia, Kenya, Tanzania, and Uganda.

== See also ==
- Pennisetum purpureum
- Forage grass
