= Cenchrus distichophyllus =

Scientific classification
- Kingdom: Plantae
- Clade: Tracheophytes
- Clade: Angiosperms
- Clade: Monocots
- Clade: Commelinids
- Order: Poales
- Family: Poaceae
- Subfamily: Panicoideae
- Genus: Cenchrus
- Species: C. distichophyllus

Binomial name
- Cenchrus distichophyllus Griseb.

Species of grass

Cenchrus distichophyllus is a grass species native to Cuba.

Cenchrus distichophyllus is a perennial herb, forming clumps. Leaves are up to 2.5 cm (0.98 in) long, tapering to a rigid tip. Spikelet is up to 2.5 cm (0.98 in) long with bristly hairs, with an involucre half the length of the spikelet.
