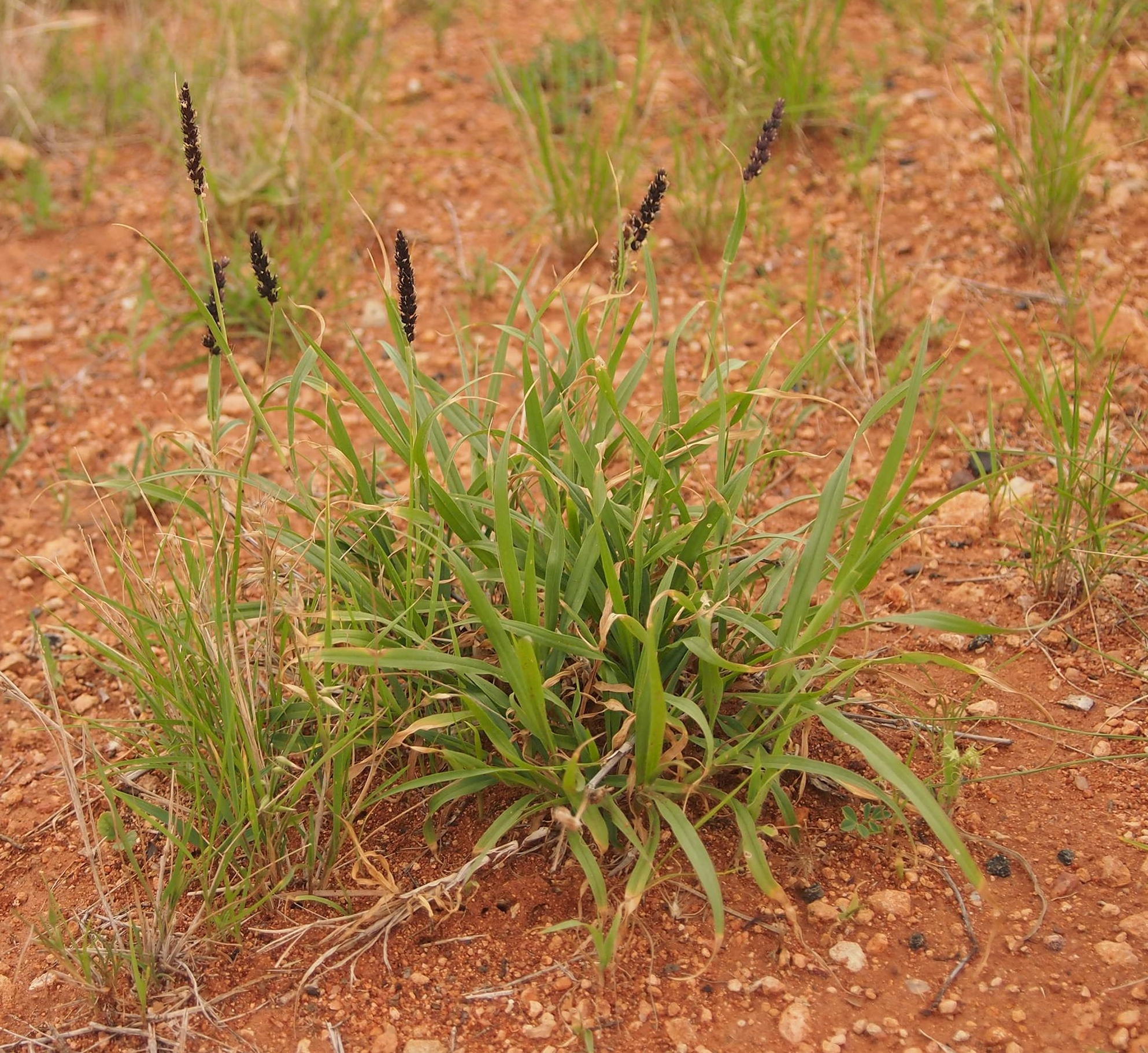
- Habit
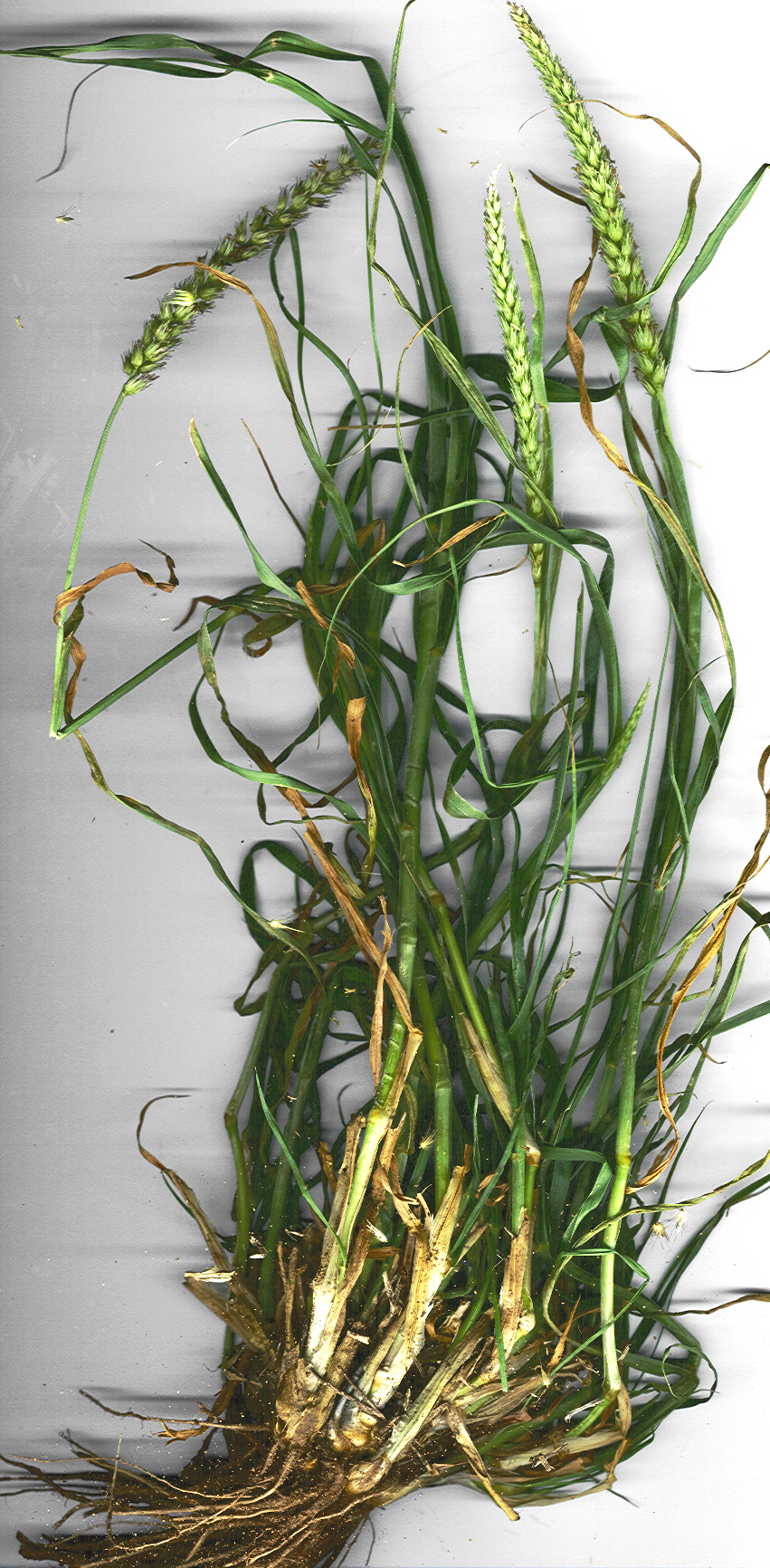
- Uprooted specimen

Conservation status
- Least Concern (IUCN 3.1)

Scientific classification
- Kingdom: Plantae
- Clade: Tracheophytes
- Clade: Angiosperms
- Clade: Monocots
- Clade: Commelinids
- Order: Poales
- Family: Poaceae
- Subfamily: Panicoideae
- Genus: Cenchrus
- Species: C. setiger

Binomial name
- Cenchrus setiger Vahl

Synonyms
- List: Cenchrus bulbifer Hochst. ex Boiss.; Cenchrus ciliaris var. setiger (Vahl) Maire & Weiller; Cenchrus montanus Nees ex Steud.; Cenchrus quinquevalvis Buch.-Ham. ex Wall.; Cenchrus schimperi Hochst. & Steud.; Cenchrus tripsacoides R.Br.; Cenchrus uniflorus Ehrenb. ex Boiss.; Pennisetum ciliare var. setigerum (Vahl) Leeke; Pennisetum setigerum (Vahl) Wipff; Pennisetum vahlii Kunth

= Cenchrus setiger =

Species of grass

Cenchrus setiger (syn. Pennisetum setigerum), the birdwood grass, is a species in the grass family Poaceae. It native to drier parts of Africa, the Arabian Peninsula, Iran, India, and as far as Myanmar, and has been introduced to the United States, Brazil, and Australia. Drought-tolerant and quite palatable to livestock, it is a valuable fodder and forage in areas that get as little as 200 mm of rain per year, but its productivity is low.
