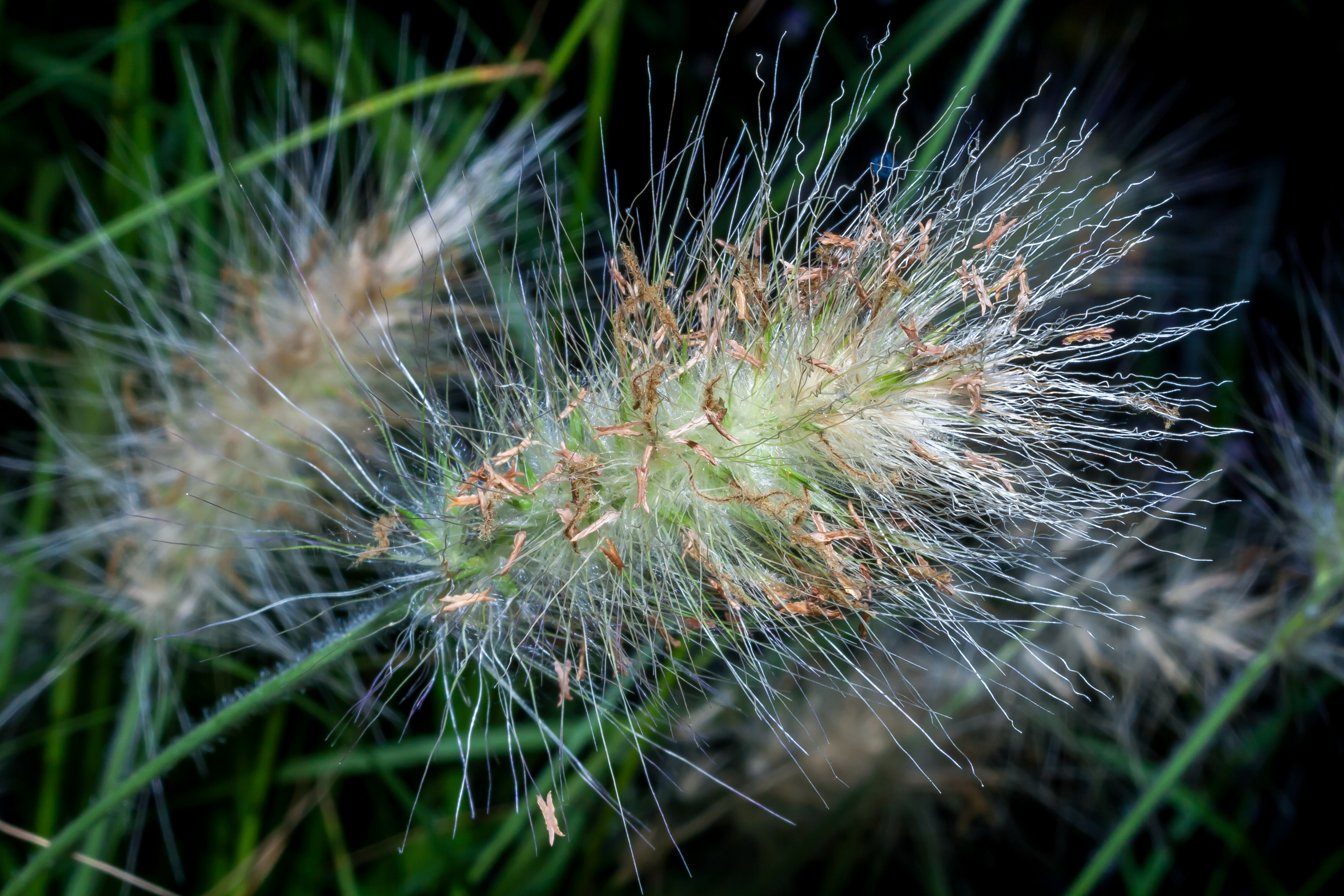

Scientific classification
- Kingdom: Plantae
- Clade: Tracheophytes
- Clade: Angiosperms
- Clade: Monocots
- Clade: Commelinids
- Order: Poales
- Family: Poaceae
- Subfamily: Panicoideae
- Genus: Cenchrus
- Species: C. longisetus

Binomial name
- Cenchrus longisetus M.C.Johnst.

Synonyms
- Pennisetum villosum Fresen.

= Cenchrus longisetus =

Species of grass

Cenchrus longisetus, previously Pennisetum villosum, is a species of flowering plant in the family Poaceae, known by the common name feathertop grass or just feathertop. It is native to northeastern Africa and parts of the Arabian Peninsula, and it is grown elsewhere as an ornamental plant. It can sometimes be found growing wild where it has escaped cultivation. This is a perennial grass growing in rhizomatous clumps, producing erect stems up to about 75 centimeters tall. The inflorescence is a panicle of clustered spikelets surrounded by a cloudlike mass of plumose white bristles up to 5 centimeters long.

The Latin specific epithet villosum means "with soft hairs".

In temperate climates it is hardy in mild or coastal areas, where temperatures do not fall much below freezing. Alternatively it is often grown as an annual.

This plant has gained the Royal Horticultural Society's Award of Garden Merit.
