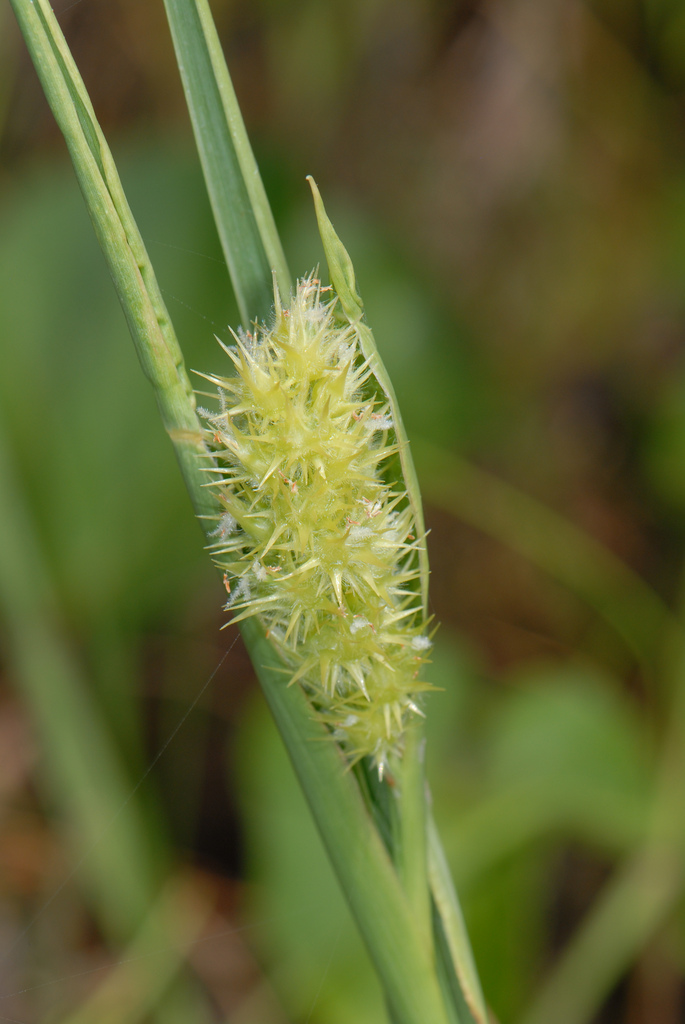
- The sharp clinging fruit of the grass flowers usually contain 1-8 spikelets enclosed in a spiny bur

Scientific classification
- Kingdom: Plantae
- Clade: Tracheophytes
- Clade: Angiosperms
- Clade: Monocots
- Clade: Commelinids
- Order: Poales
- Family: Poaceae
- Subfamily: Panicoideae
- Genus: Cenchrus
- Species: C. tribuloides

Binomial name
- Cenchrus tribuloides L.

= Cenchrus tribuloides =

Species of grass

Cenchrus tribuloides, the dune sandbur, is a grass common along the east coast of the mainland United States as well as Hawaii. It is also known as the sanddune sandbur, long-spine sandbur or sand-dune sandspur and is common in sandy, marshy, or loosely forested areas. It differs from C. spinifex in its larger spikelets and smaller number of spikelets per fascicle, and from C. longispinus in its densely pubescent fascicles, fewer bristles, and wider inner bristles.

== Distribution ==
In the United States, the dune sandbur is native to Maine, Vermont, Massachusetts, Rhode Island, Connecticut, Pennsylvania, Maryland, Delaware, Virginia, North Carolina, South Carolina, Georgia, Alabama, Florida, Mississippi, and Louisiana. In Hawaii it is an invasive plant. It is considered threatened in New York. It can also be found natively in Brazil, the Bahamas, Bermuda, the Cayman Islands, Cuba, Haiti, Jamaica, and Puerto Rico.

== Habitat and ecology ==
The dune sandbur is an annual plant that grows in dunes, in loose sands, in thin woods, and in the open. It exhibits a sprawling habitat where it can be found. It can be found along coastal states, from Mississippi to New York, where it grows primarily in August and September.

== Morphology ==
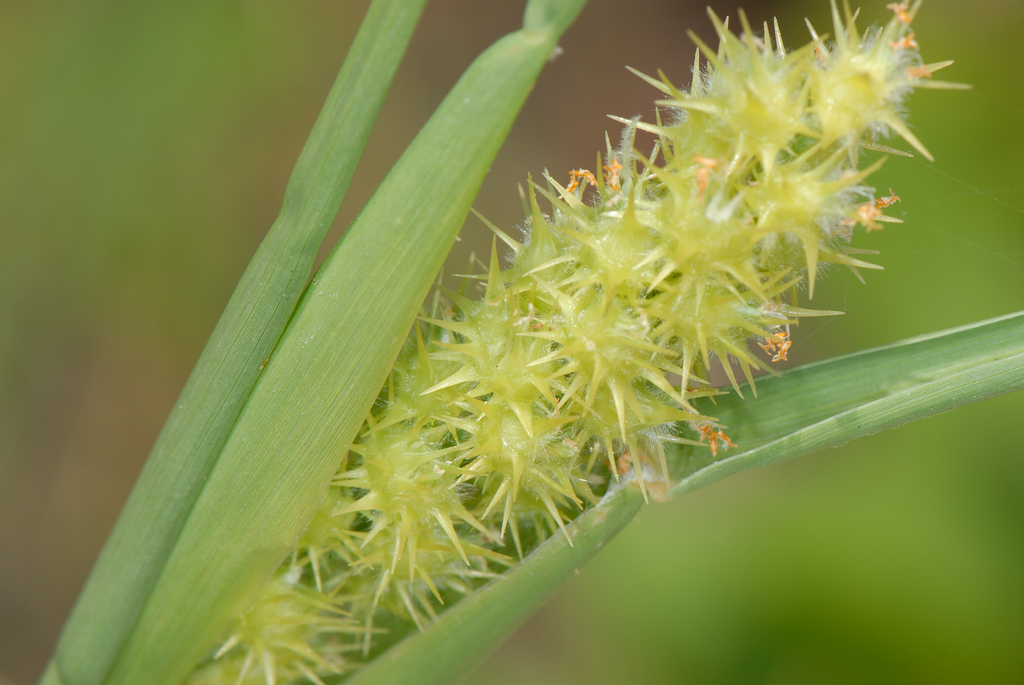

Individuals of this species grow in small, spiky pods. Flowers usually small but not numerous. Leaves are 2 ranked, internodes hollow. Plants tall or short, in spikelets bisexual and alike. Spikelets in hard burs bearing hard, stiff spines. 1-8 spikelets enclosed in a tiny bur, the spines minutely barbed downward near the tip. Parts of spines can break off under the skin and become quite painful. It is an annual plant, and easily recognized by the densely hairy cup-like burs that, including spines, are 10–15 mm wide. Burs usually have 15-43 spines, in spikelike racemes, with pedicels swollen. Leaf sheaths are inflated, and blades are usually folded.

== Flowers and fruit ==
The spur of the dune sandbur act as its fruit. Reproduction occurs through epizoochory, by both waterborne transportation or by being dispersed by animals that the sandbur clings to. The spines appear to serve as deterrent to preserve the seeds from consumption and also contribute to their wind dispersal. They have barbs of various sizes and of mostly uniform shape spread uniformly over its surface. These barbs are more numerous near the surface of the spine. The interior tissue of the spine is made up of thick walled cells. Each barb contains a tube like air cavity which is filled with a light purple substance that, when the barb is broken off from the spine, can cause inflammation of the wound.
