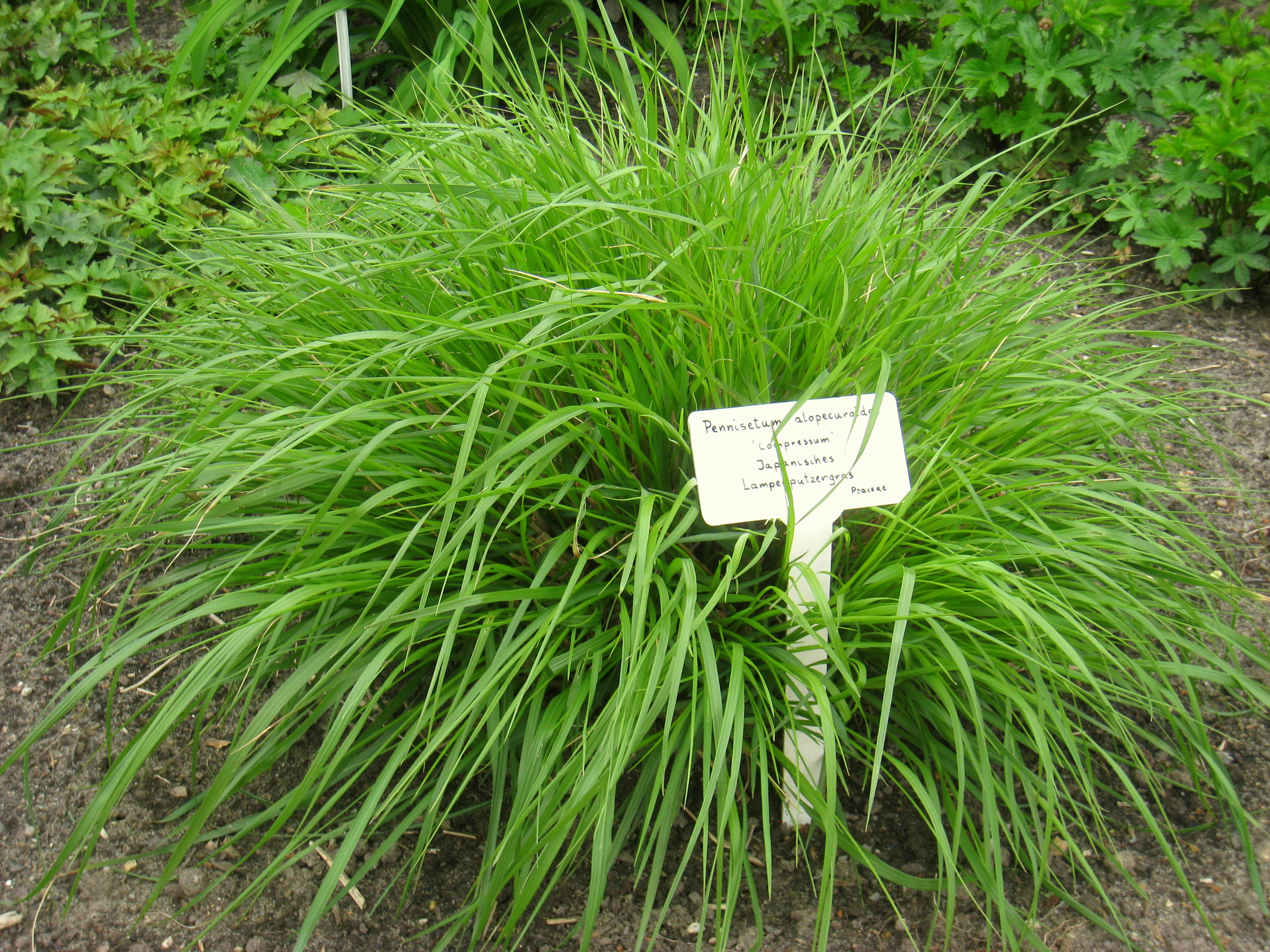

Scientific classification
- Kingdom: Plantae
- Clade: Tracheophytes
- Clade: Angiosperms
- Clade: Monocots
- Clade: Commelinids
- Order: Poales
- Family: Poaceae
- Subfamily: Panicoideae
- Genus: Cenchrus
- Species: C. alopecuroides

Binomial name
- Cenchrus alopecuroides (L.) Thunb.

Synonyms
- Alopecurus hordeiformis L.; Panicum alopecuroides L. (basionym); Pennisetum alopecuroides (L.) Spreng.; Pennisetum compressum R.Br.; Pennisetum hordeiforme (Thunb.) Spreng.; Pennisetum japonicum Trin. ex Spreng.

= Cenchrus alopecuroides =

Species of grass

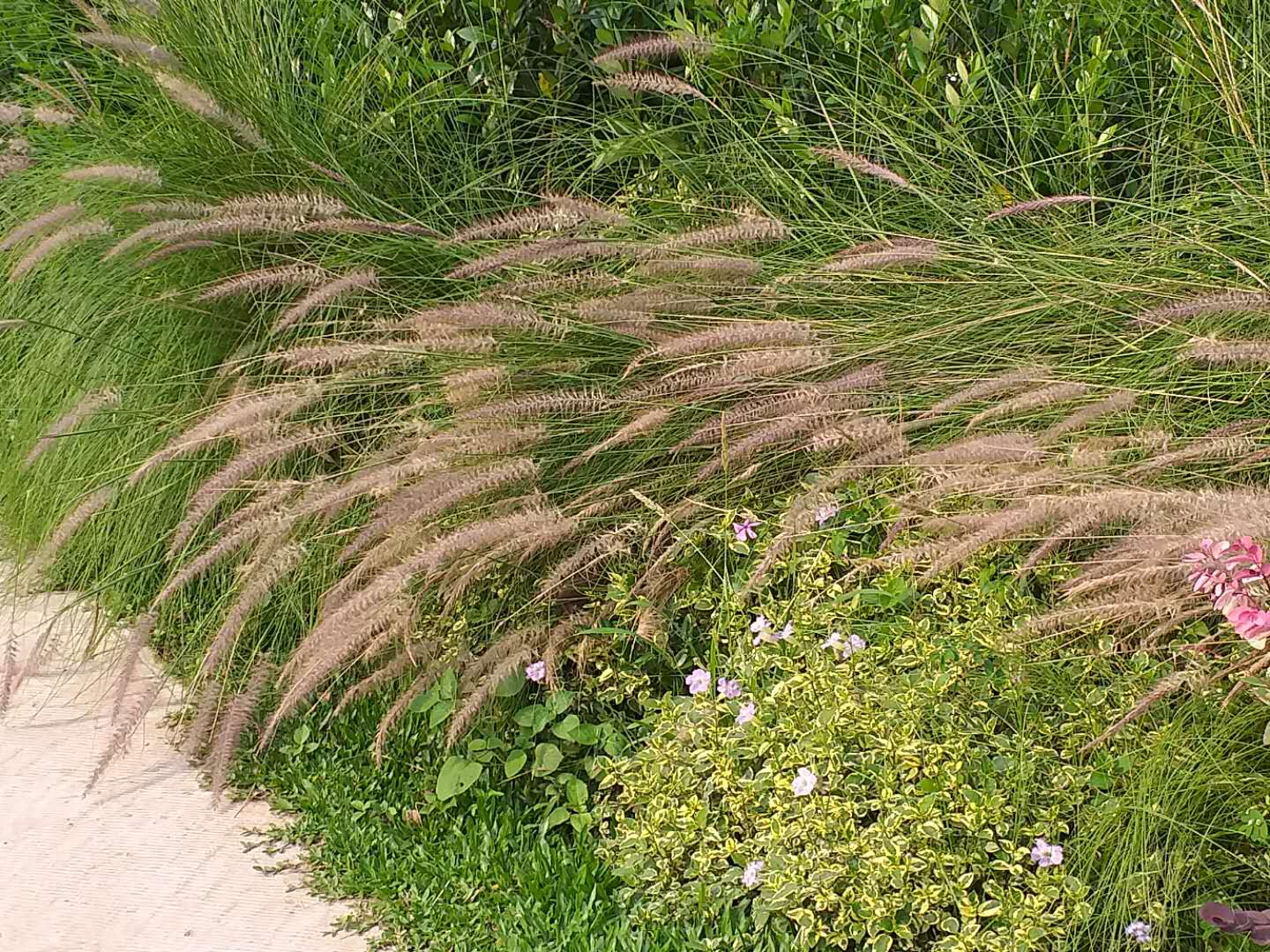

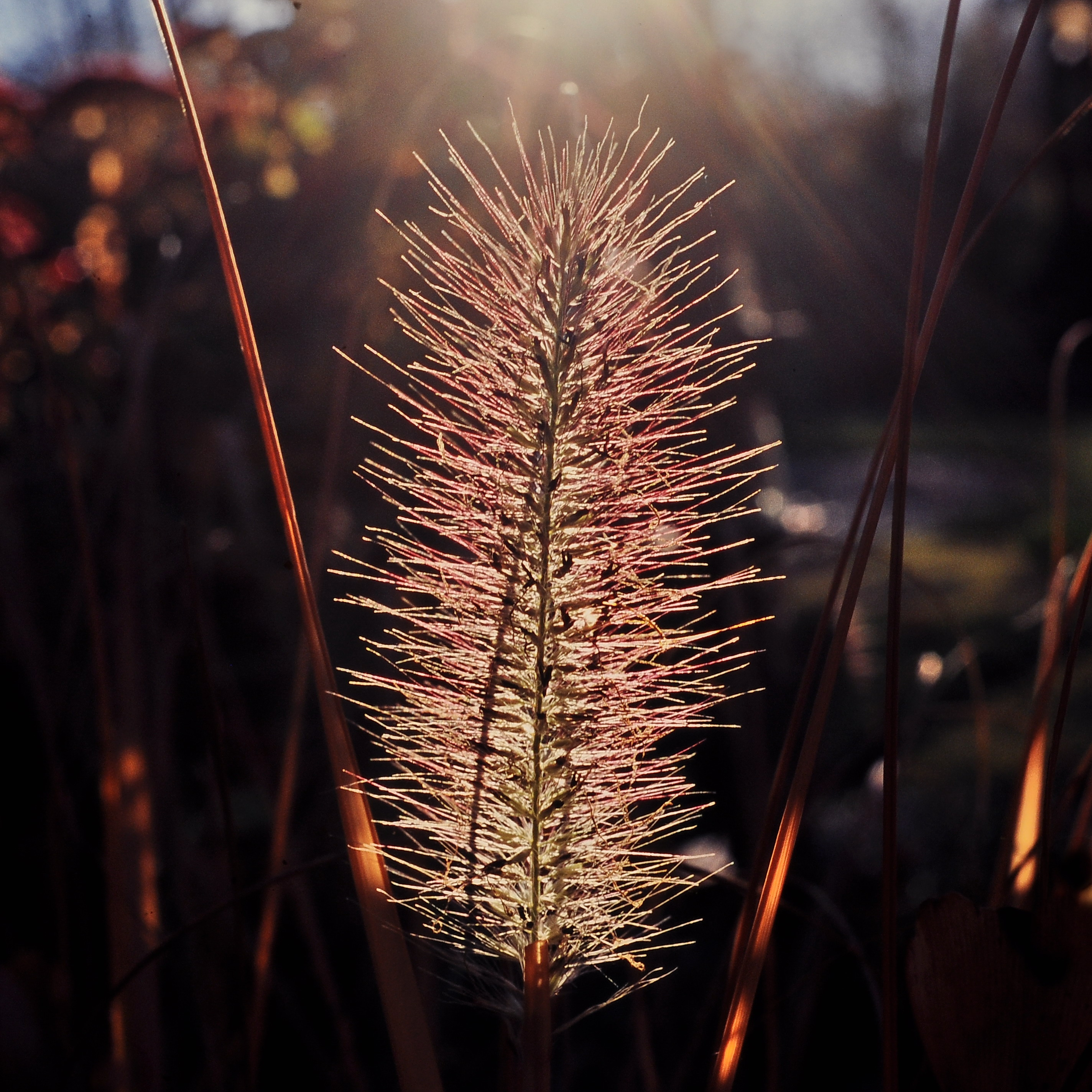

Cenchrus alopecuroides, previously Pennisetum alopecuroides (Pen-ih-SEE-tum al-oh-pek-yur-OY-deez), commonly known as the Chinese pennisetum, Chinese fountaingrass, dwarf fountain grass, foxtail fountain grass, or swamp foxtail grass, is a species of perennial grass native to Asia and Australia. The culms are erect, and 60–100 cm long. The leaf-blades are erect or drooping; flat, or conduplicate (folded lengthwise) or involute (spiral); and from 10 to 45 cm long by 3–6 mm wide.

The Latin specific epithet alopecuroides means "like the genus Alopecurus (foxtail)".

== Description ==
The plant is a warm season ornamental grass which typically grows in graceful, spreading clumps from 2–3 ft (0.61–0.91 m) tall and wide. It features narrow, medium to deep green leaves (to 1/2" wide) in summer, changing to golden yellow in fall, and fading to beige in late fall. The foliage usually remains attractive throughout the winter. Showy, silvery to pinkish-white, bristly, bottle brush-like flower spikes arch outward from the clump in late summer like water spraying from a fountain (hence the common name "fountain grass"). The flower spikes turn brownish as the seeds form, and usually persist until late fall or early winter before shattering. Many cultivars are available in horticulture, ranging in height from 1–5 ft (0.30–1.52 m) and featuring a variety of different flower colors (purples, pinks or whites) and autumn foliage.

== Growing conditions ==
The plant generally needs a sheltered position in full sun to light shade. It prefers moist, well-drained soil. It will grow in any mild or coastal area where the temperature does not fall below −5 °C (23 °F). The best time of the year for planting is between late Summer and Winter.

== Cultivars ==
The following cultivars have received gained the Royal Horticultural Society's Award of Garden Merit:

- 'Cassian's Choice' (brown flowerheads flushed pink)
- 'Hameln' (purplish flower heads)
- 'Red Head' (dark red flower heads)
