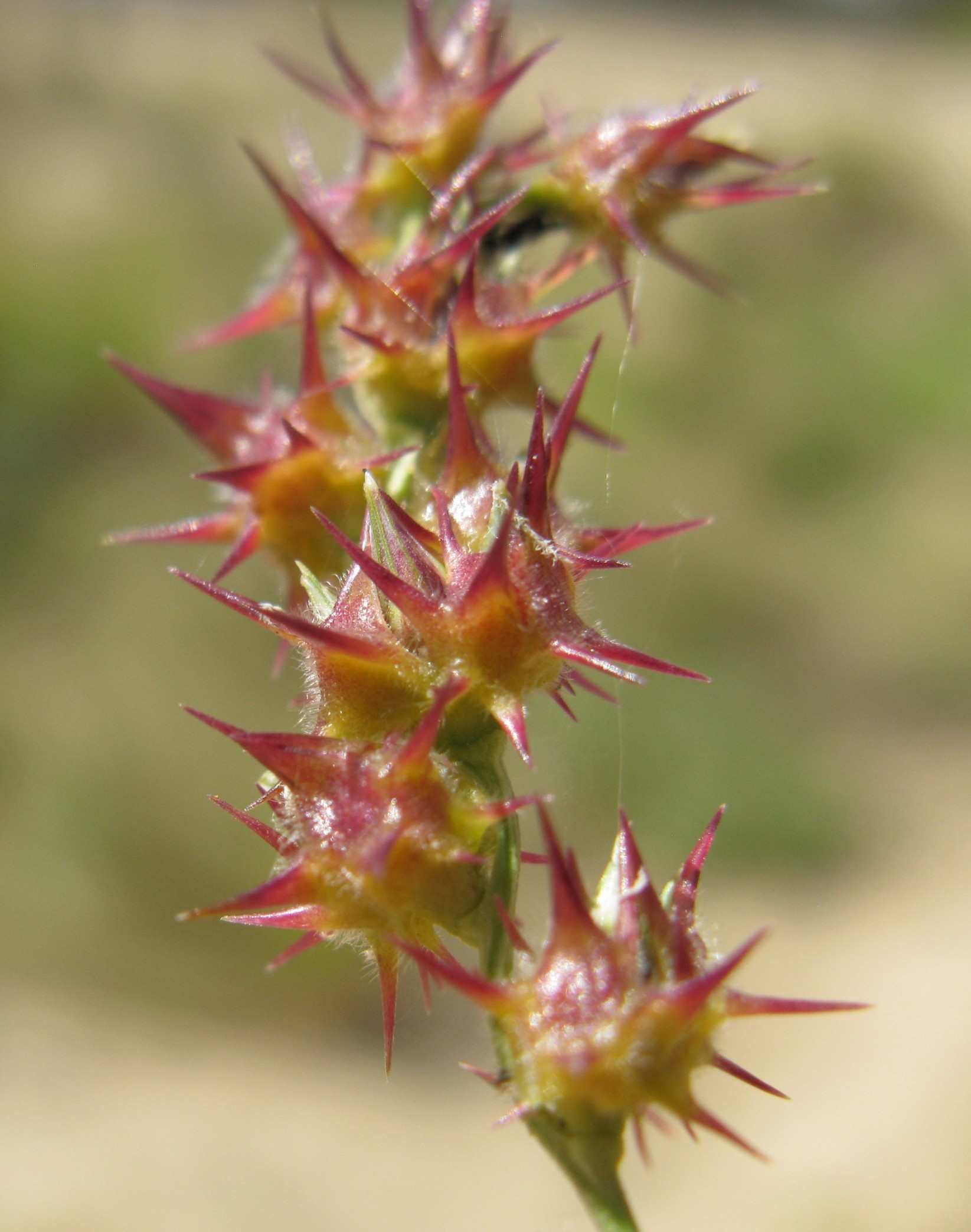

Scientific classification
- Kingdom: Plantae
- Clade: Tracheophytes
- Clade: Angiosperms
- Clade: Monocots
- Clade: Commelinids
- Order: Poales
- Family: Poaceae
- Subfamily: Panicoideae
- Genus: Cenchrus
- Species: C. spinifex

Binomial name
- Cenchrus spinifex Cav.

Synonyms
- Cenchrus incertus M.A.Curtis; Cenchrus pauciflorus Benth.

= Cenchrus spinifex =

Species of plant

Cenchrus spinifex, known commonly as the common sandbur, coastal sandbur, stickerweed, or stickerbur, is a perennial grass that grows from 5 to 30 inches (13 to 76 cm) high in sandy or gravelly terrain. It is native to the southern United States southward into Mexico and the Caribbean. It has been introduced elsewhere in the United States and in the Philippines and South Africa. It is a noxious weed in Europe.

The grass produces a bur, a type of grain fruit, consisting of eight to forty sharp, barbed spines that lodge in clothes, exposed feet, and fur.

== Gallery ==
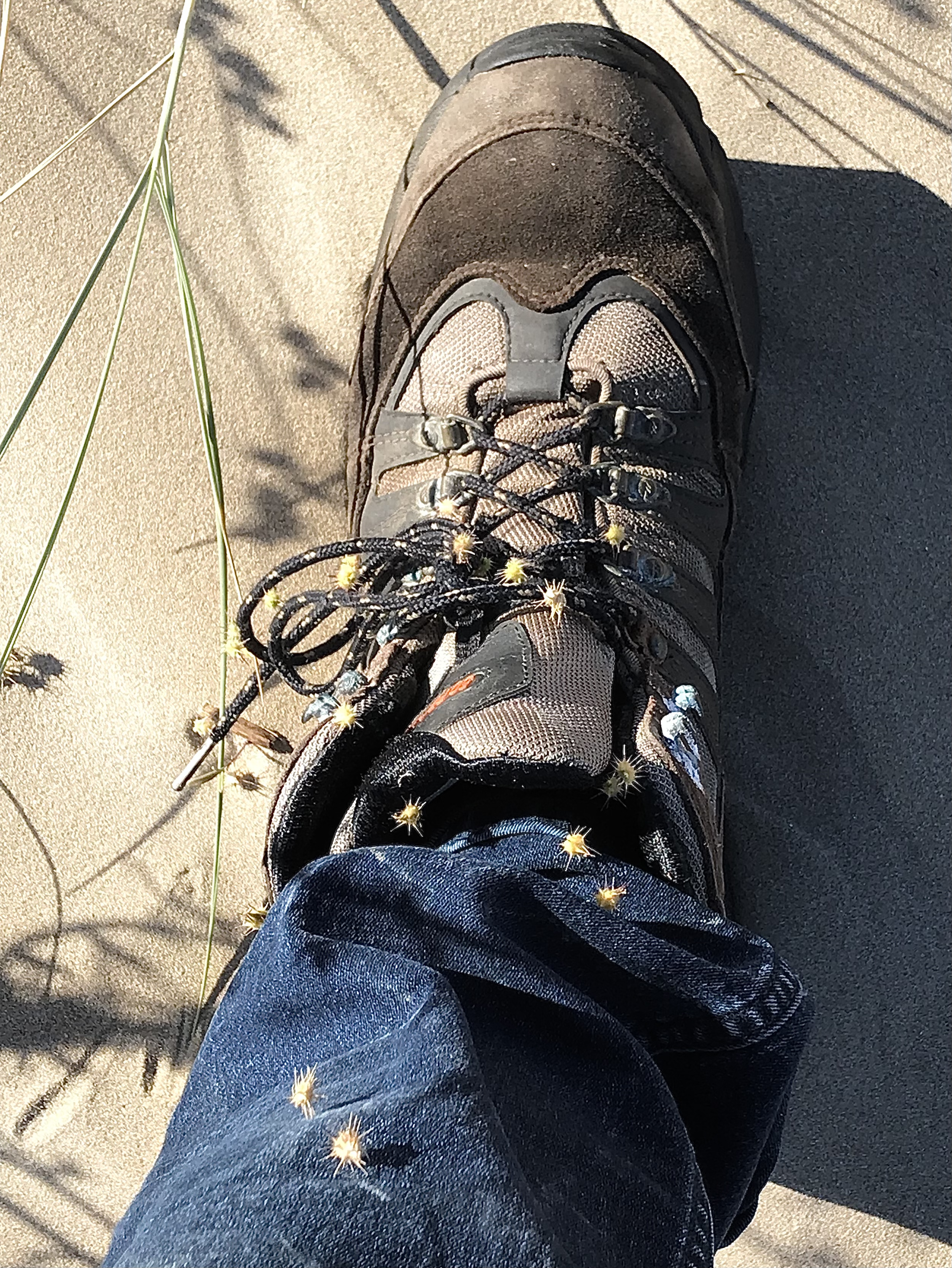
Epizoochory: spiny burs of C. spinifex clinging to clothing on a beach in Vieste, Italy
