= Antonio Bey Figari =

Italian pharmacist (1804–1870)

Antonio Bey Figari (16 May 1804, in Genoa – 8 November 1870, in Genoa) was an Italian pharmacist and naturalist.

== Life ==
He studied pharmacy at the University of Genoa, and following graduation traveled to Egypt, where he found work in Alexandria. In 1829, he was appointed by the French military as an overseer of the military hospital in Cairo. In Cairo, he also taught classes in botany at the medical school and from 1833 was director of its laboratories. In 1839 he was given duties as an inspector of pharmacies. In the meantime, he collected natural history material in Egypt, sending botanical specimens from his excursions to Domenico Viviani in Italy. Later, his collected material was sent to Giuseppe De Notaris.

From 1844 to 1849, by way of requests from Muhammad Ali and Abbas I, he conducted exploratory investigations for marble and coal in Egypt, Anatolia and the Arabian Desert. During these geological undertakings, he was able to make further collections of plants, of which he shipped to the herbarium in Florence.

In 1830, Domenico Viviani named the plant genus Figaraea in his honor. With Giuseppe De Notaris, he was the binomial co-author of a number of species from the grass family Poaceae.

== Writings associated with Antonio Figari ==
- Agrostographiae Aegyptiacae fragmenta, 1853 (with Giuseppe De Notaris)
- Nuovi materiali per l'algologia del Mar Rosso, 1853 (with Giuseppe De Notaris) - New algological material from the Red Sea.
- Fragmenta florulae Aethiopico-Aegyptiacae ex plantis praecipue ab. Antonio Figari, 1854 (by Philip Barker Webb).
- Plantarum in Mari Rubro hucusque collectarum, 1858 (with Giovanni Zanardini).
- Studii scientifici sull'Egitto e sue adiacenze, compresa la penisola dell'Arabia Petrea, 1864 - Scientific study in Egypt and its surroundings, including the peninsula of Arabia Petraea.
- L'exploration scientifique de l'Egypte sous le régne de Mohammed Ali, 1896 (by Albert Deflers) - Scientific exploration of Egypt during the reign of Mohammed Ali.
