= Giuseppe De Notaris =

Italian botanist (1805–1877)

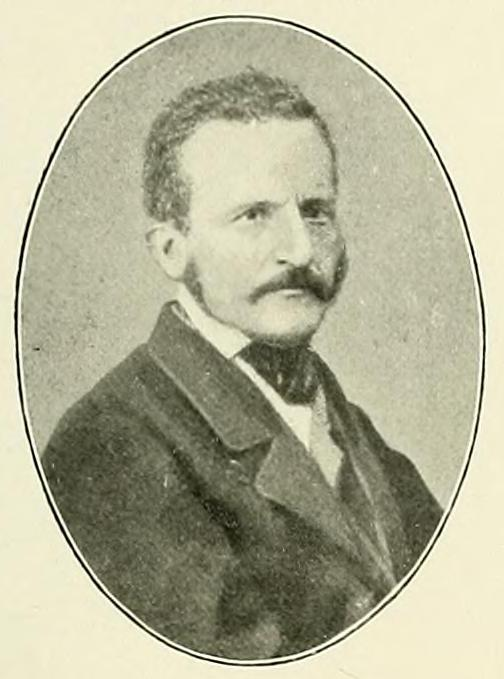
De Notaris

Giuseppe De Notaris (18 April 1805 – 22 January 1877) was an Italian botanist generally known for his work with cryptogams native to Italy.

== Biography ==
Born 18 April 1805, in Milan, he studied medicine at the University of Pavia, obtaining his medical degree in 1830. Having developed an interest in botany, by 1832 he had abandoned the field of medicine. In 1836, he accepted an assignment at the botanical garden in Turin, and a few years later, was named professor of botany and director of the botanical garden at the University of Genoa (1839). In 1872, he was appointed chair of botany at the University of Rome. Together with Francesco Baglietto, Vincenzo de Cesati and Giuseppe Gabriel Balsamo-Crivelli he edited several exsiccata series, the largest of them named Erbario crittogamico Italiano. Series I.

In the field of mycology, he proposed the fungi family Hypocreaceae (1845). With Antonio Bey Figari (1804–1870), he described numerous species from the family Poaceae. With Figari, he was the binomial co-author of the grass genus Schistachne (synonym Stipagrostis). He also described the lichen genus Buellia. Species with the specific epithet of notarisiana commemorate his name.

== Selected works ==
- Muscologiae italicae spicilegium, 1837.
- Syllabus muscorum in Italia et in insulis circumstantibus hucusque cognitorum, 1838.
- Florula Caprariae : sive, Enumeratio plantarum in insula Capraria : vel sponte nascentium vel ad utilitatem latius excultarum, 1839 (with Giuseppe Giacinto Moris).
- Repertorium florae Ligusticae, 1844.
- Agrostograhiae Aegyptiacae fragmenta, 1852 (with Antonio Bey Figari).
- Musci italici, 1862.
- Sferiacei italici, 1863.
- Epilogo della Briologia Italiana, 1869.

== See also ==
- Taxa named by Giuseppe De Notaris
