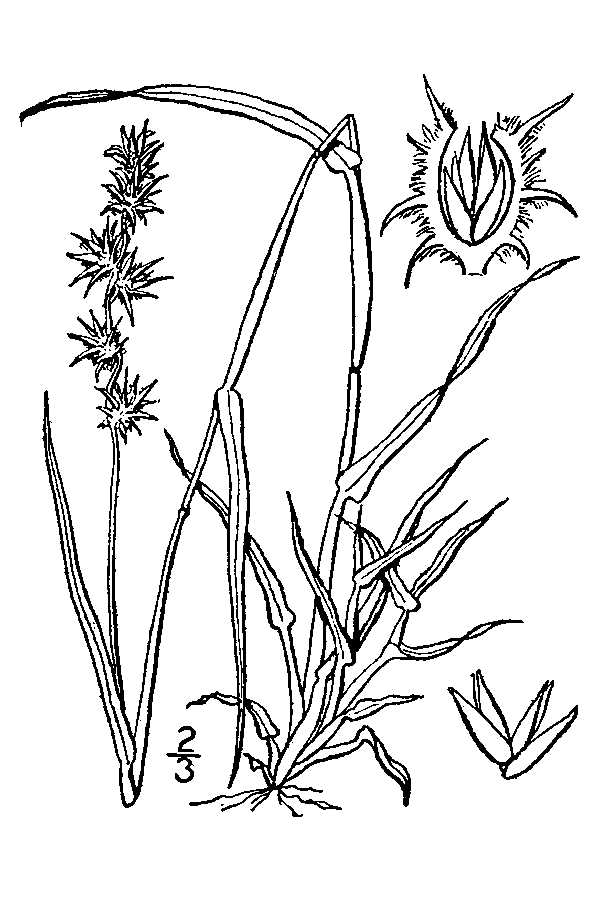
- Cenchrus longispinus line drawing
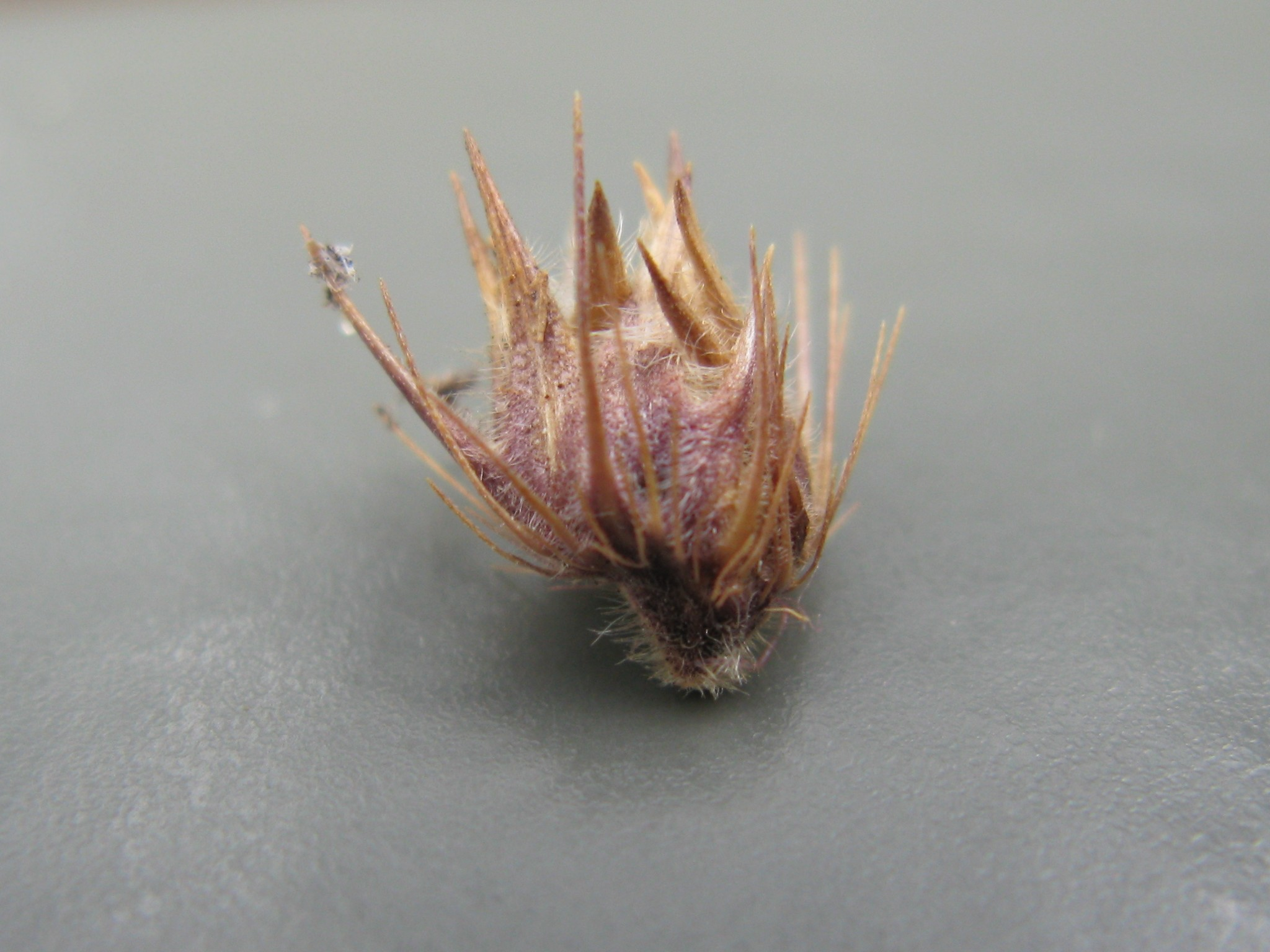
- Cenchrus echinatus burr

Scientific classification
- Kingdom: Plantae
- Clade: Embryophytes
- Clade: Tracheophytes
- Clade: Spermatophytes
- Clade: Angiosperms
- Clade: Monocots
- Clade: Commelinids
- Order: Poales
- Family: Poaceae
- Subfamily: Panicoideae
- Supertribe: Panicodae
- Tribe: Paniceae
- Subtribe: Cenchrinae
- Genus: Cenchrus; L. (1753)

Type species
- Cenchrus echinatus L.

Synonyms
- Amphochaeta Andersson (1855); Beckeropsis Fig. & De Not. (1853); Catatherophora Steud. (1829); Cenchropsis Nash (1903); Echinaria Fabr. (1759), rejected name not Desf. 1799; Eriochaeta Fig. & De Not. (1853); Gymnotrix P.Beauv. (1812); Kikuyuochloa H.Scholz (2006); Lloydia Delile (1844), nom. illeg.; Odontelytrum Hack. (1898); Penicillaria Willd. (1809); Pennisetum Rich. (1805); Pseudochaetochloa Hitchc. (1924); Raram Adans. (1763); Runcina Allamand (1770); Sericura Hassk. (1842)

= Cenchrus =

Genus of grasses

Cenchrus is a widespread genus of plants in the grass family, native to tropical and warm temperate regions of the world. Its species are native to many countries in Asia, Africa, Australia, the Americas, and various oceanic islands.

Common names include buffelgrasses, sandburs, and sand spur. Such names allude to the sharp, spine-covered burrs characterizing the inflorescences of the members of the genus. Those previously classified as Pennisetum /ˌpɛnɪˈsiːtəm/ are known commonly as fountaingrasses (fountain grasses).

== Taxonomy ==
=== Pennisetum ===
Pennisetum is a former genus that heavily overlaps with Cenchrus, and the boundary between them has been unclear. Cenchrus was derived from Pennisetum and the two are grouped in a monophyletic clade. A main morphological character that has been used to distinguish them is the degree of fusion of the bristles in the inflorescence, but this is often unreliable. In 2010, researchers proposed to transfer Pennisetum into Cenchrus, along with the related genus Odontelytrum. The genus is currently not accepted as separate from Cenchrus in Kew's Plants of the World Online database.

== Distribution ==
The various species are native to Africa, Asia, Australia, and Latin America, with some of them widely naturalized in Europe and North America, as well as on various oceanic islands.

== Description ==
They are annual or perennial grasses. Some are petite while others can produce stems up to 8 meters tall. The inflorescence is a very dense, narrow panicle containing fascicles of spikelets interspersed with bristles. There are three kinds of bristle, and some species have all three, while others do not. Some bristles are coated in hairs, sometimes long, showy, plumelike hairs that inspired the genus name, the Latin penna ("feather") and seta ("bristle").

== Uses ==
The genus includes pearl millet (P. glaucum), an important food crop. Napier grass (P. purpureum) is used for grazing livestock in Africa.

Several species are cultivated as ornamental plants, notably P. advena, P. alopecuroides, P. orientale, P. setaceum, and P. villosum. The cultivar 'Fairy Tails' is a recipient of the Royal Horticultural Society's Award of Garden Merit.

== Ecology ==
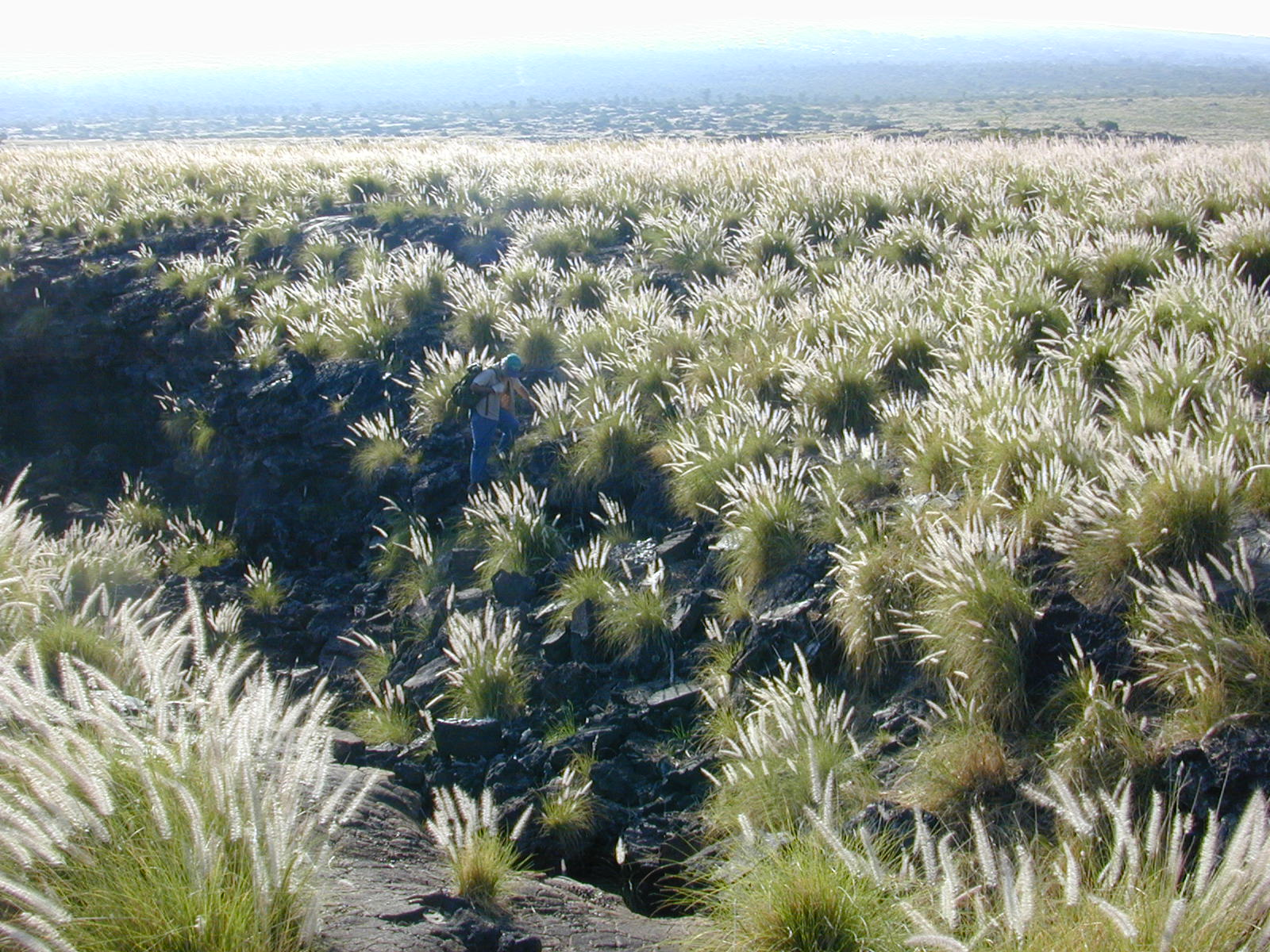
Invasive Cenchrus setaceus growing on a lava flow in Hawaii

Many Pennisetum grasses are noxious weeds, including feathertop grass (P. villosum) and kikuyu grass (P. clandestinum), which is also a popular and hardy turf grass in some parts of the world.

The herbage and seeds of these grasses are food for herbivores, such as the chestnut-breasted mannikin (Lonchura castaneothorax), the caterpillar of the butterfly Melanitis phedima, and the larvae of the fly genus Delia.

The genus is a host of the pathogenic fungus Cochliobolus sativus.

== Species ==
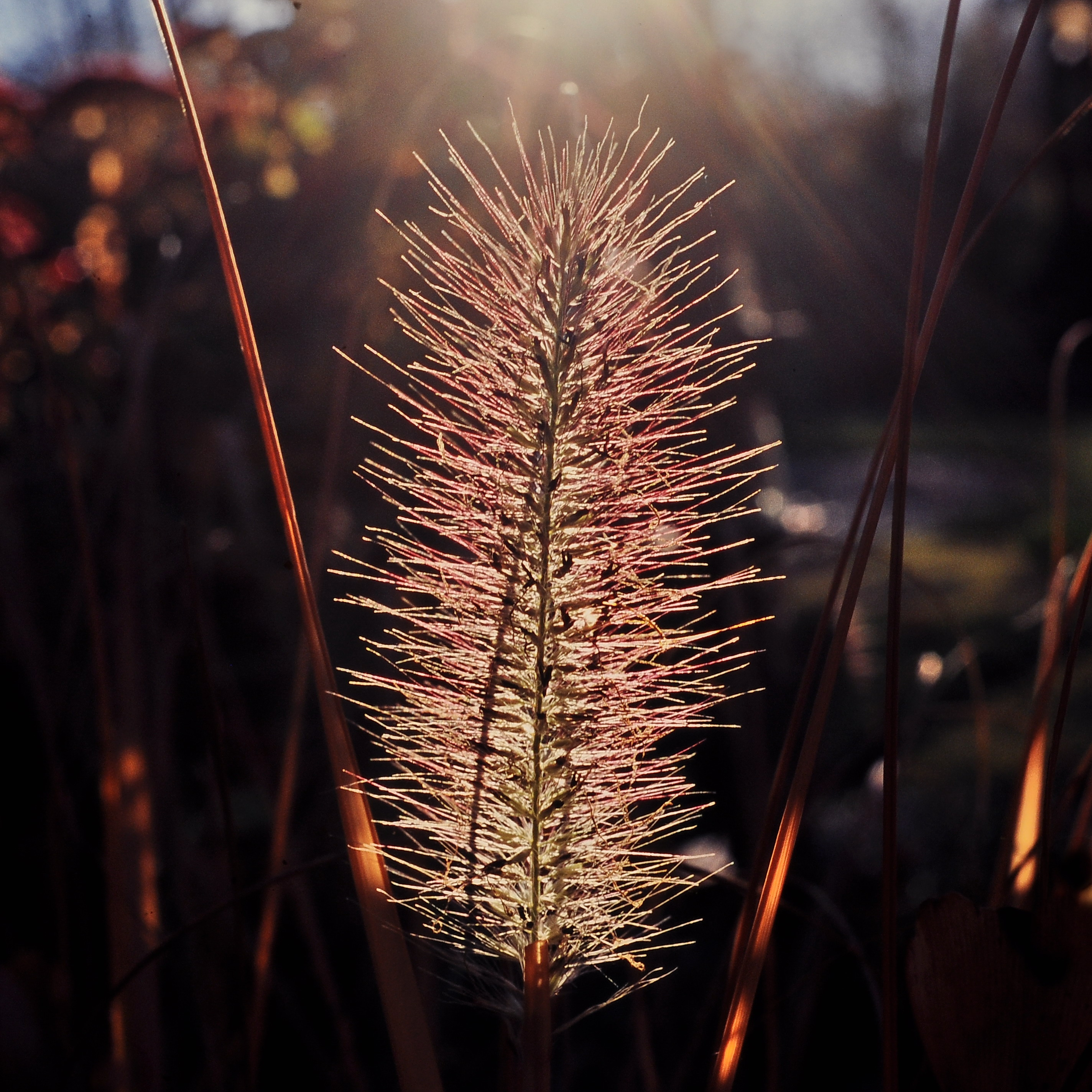
Cenchrus alopecuroides

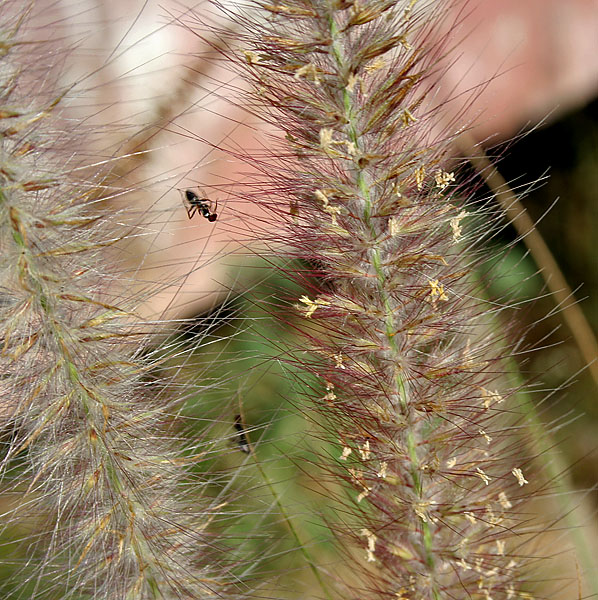
Cenchrus hohenackeri

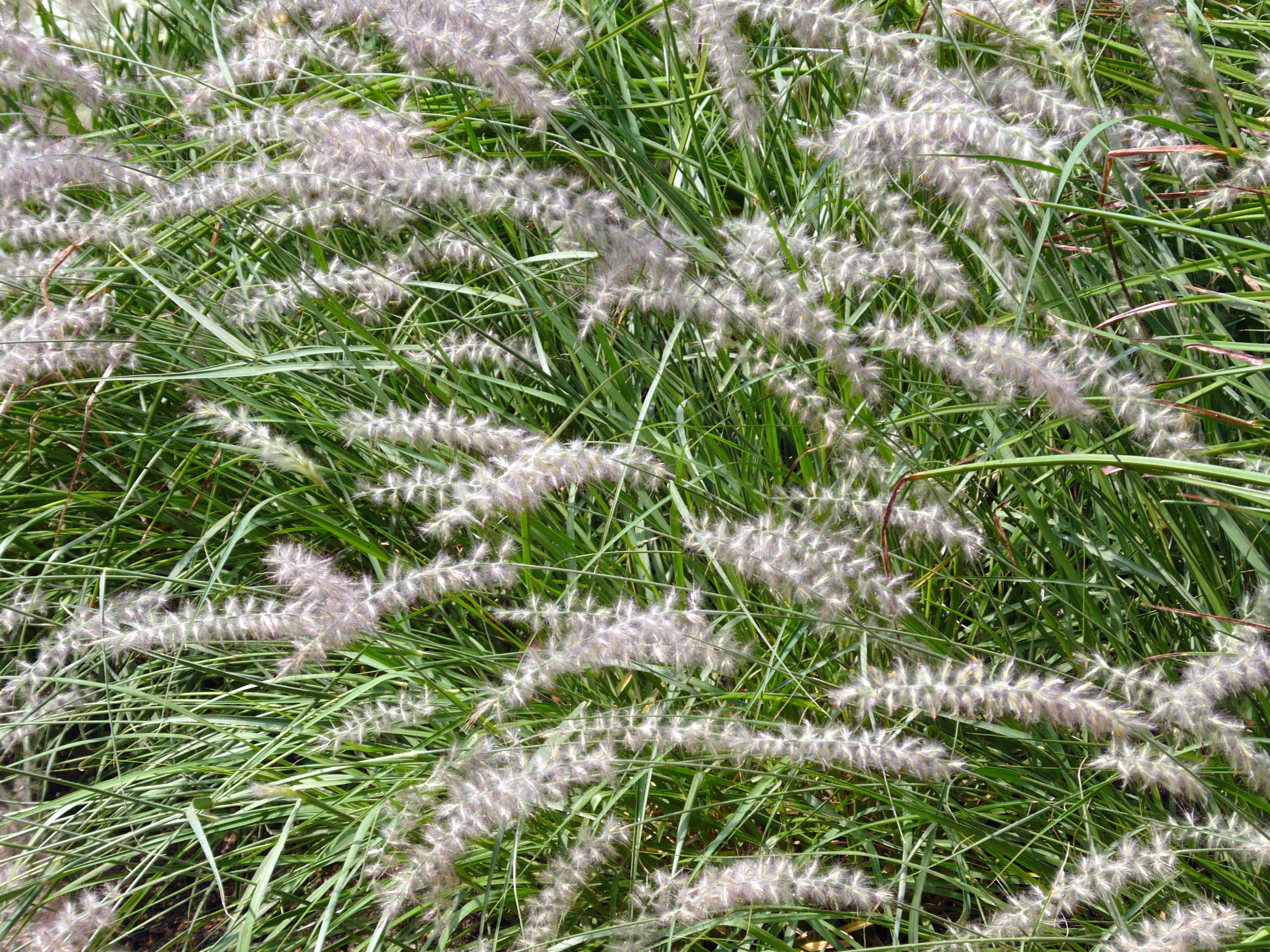
Cenchrus orientalis

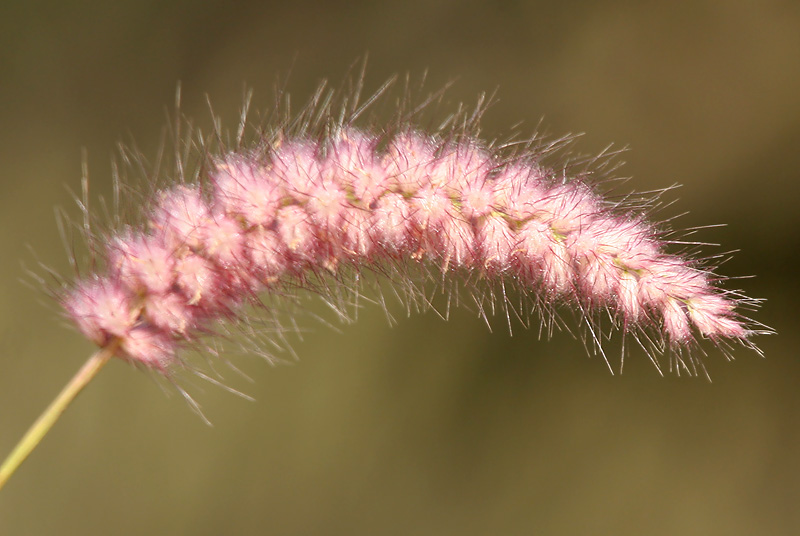
Cenchrus pedicellatus

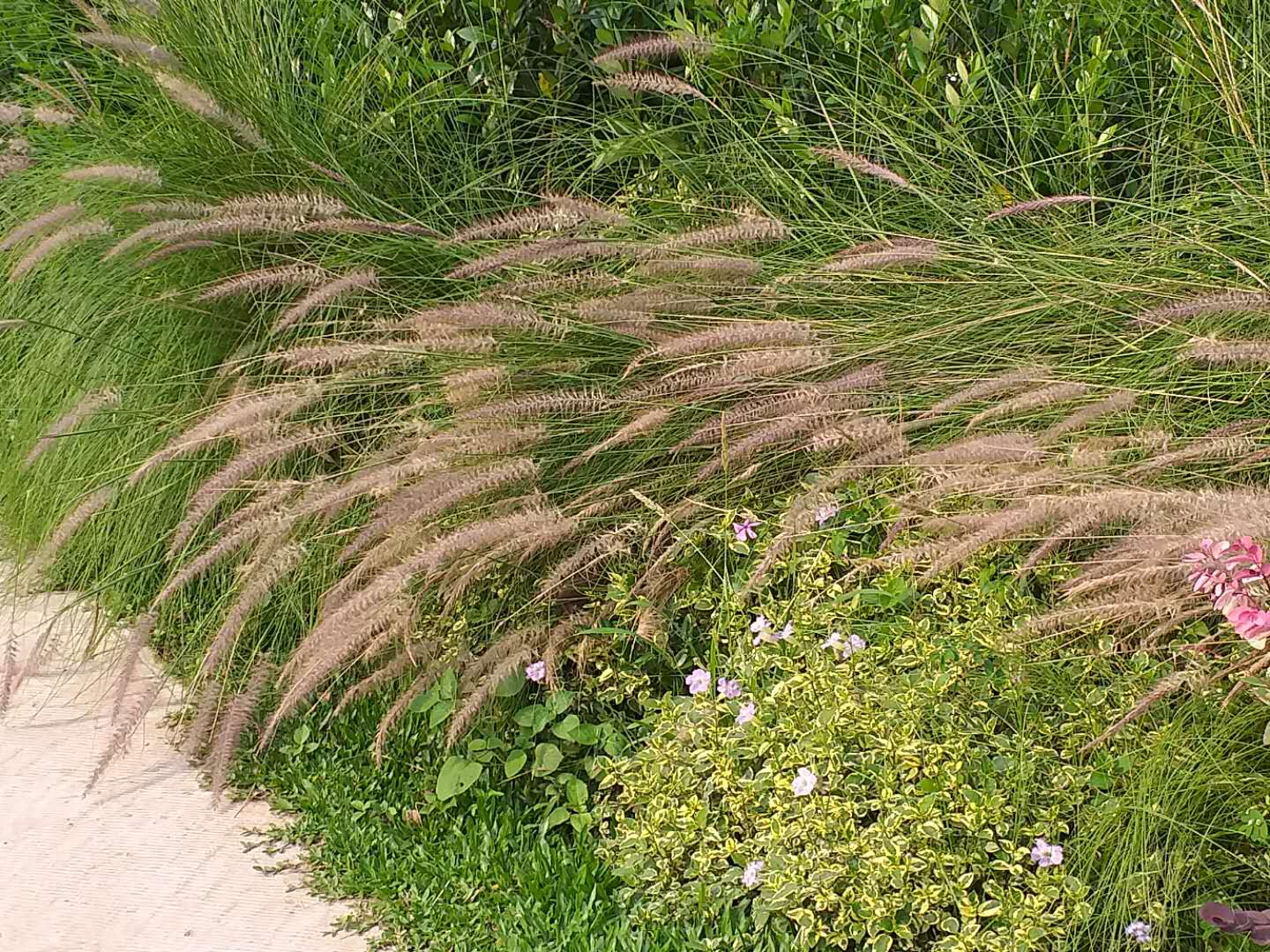
Cenchrus alopecuroides

108 species are currently accepted. They include:

- Cenchrus abyssinicus (Hack.) Morrone – Ethiopia, Tanzania, Yemen, Limpopo, Mpumalanga
- Cenchrus agrimonioides Trin. – kāmanomano – Hawaiian Islands
- Cenchrus alopecuroides (L.) Thunb.
- Cenchrus americanus (L.) Morrone
- Cenchrus annuus (Mez) Morrone
- Cenchrus arnhemicus (F.Muell.) Morrone – Australia (Western Australia and Northern Territory)
- Cenchrus articularis (Trin.) M.W.Tornab. & W.L.Wagner
- Cenchrus basedowii (Summerh. & C.E.Hubb.) Morrone
- Cenchrus beckeroides (Leeke) ined.
- Cenchrus biflorus Roxb. – kram-kram – Africa, Arabian Peninsula, Indian Subcontinent, and Madagascar
- Cenchrus brevisetosus (B.K.Simon) B.K.Simon – Australia (Western Australia, Northern Territory, and Queensland)
- Cenchrus brownii Roem. & Schult. – North America, South America, and West Indies
- Cenchrus cafer (Bory) Veldkamp
- Cenchrus caliculatus Cav. – Australia, New Zealand, and assorted islands in the Pacific and Indian oceans
- Cenchrus caudatus (Schrad.) Kuntze
- Cenchrus chilensis (É.Desv.) Morrone
- Cenchrus ciliaris L. – buffelgrass – Africa, Arabian Peninsula, Indian Subcontinent, and Sicily; naturalized as a nutritious arid pasture lands in parts of North and South America, Australia, Southeast Asia, and various islands; considered noxious weed in some places
- Cenchrus clandestinus (Hochst. ex Chiov.) Morrone
- Cenchrus complanatus (Nees) Morrone
- Cenchrus × cupreus (Thorpe) Govaerts
- Cenchrus distachyus (E.Fourn.) Morrone
- Cenchrus distichophyllus Griseb. – Cuba
- Cenchrus divisus (J.F.Gmel.) Verloove, Govaerts & Buttler
- Cenchrus domingensis (Spreng. ex Schult.) Morrone
- Cenchrus durus (Beal) Morrone
- Cenchrus echinatus L. – common sandbur – North America, South America, and West Indies; naturalized in parts of Africa, southern Asia, and various islands
- Cenchrus elegans (Hassk.) Veldkamp – Malesia
- Cenchrus elymoides F.Muell. – Australia (Western Australia, Northern Territory, and Queensland)
- Cenchrus exiguus (Mez) ined.
- Cenchrus flaccidus (Griseb.) Morrone
- Cenchrus flexilis (Mez) Morrone
- Cenchrus foermerianus (Leeke) Morrone
- Cenchrus geniculatus Thunb.
- Cenchrus glaucifolius (Hochst. ex A.Rich.) Rudov
- Cenchrus gracilescens (Hochst.) Zon
- Cenchrus gracillimus Nash – West Indies and southeastern USA
- Cenchrus henryanus (F.Br.) M.W.Tornab. & W.L.Wagner
- Cenchrus hohenackeri (Hochst. ex Steud.) Morrone
- Cenchrus hordeoides (Lam.) Morrone
- Cenchrus intectus (Chase) Morrone
- Cenchrus lanatus (Klotzsch) Morrone
- Cenchrus latifolius (Spreng.) Morrone
- Cenchrus laxius (Clayton) Zon
- Cenchrus ledermannii (Mez) ined.
- Cenchrus longisetus M.C.Johnst.
- Cenchrus longispinus (Hack.) Fern. – mat sandbur – Canada, USA, and Mexico
- Cenchrus longissimus (S.L.Chen & Y.X.Jin) Morrone
- Cenchrus × longistylus (Hochst. ex A.Rich.) Thulin & S.M.Phillips
- Cenchrus massaicus (Stapf) Morrone
- Cenchrus mezianus (Leeke) Morrone
- Cenchrus michoacanus H.F.Gut. & Morrone
- Cenchrus mitis Andersson – Somalia, Kenya, Tanzania, Uganda, and Mozambique
- Cenchrus monostigma (Pilg.) Morrone
- Cenchrus multiflorus J.Presl – Mexico, Central America
- Cenchrus mutilatus Kuntze
- Cenchrus myosuroides Kunth – North America, South America, and West Indies
- Cenchrus nanus (Engl.) ined.
- Cenchrus nervosus (Nees) Kuntze
- Cenchrus nodiflorus (Franch.) Zon
- Cenchrus nubicus (Hochst.) Zon
- Cenchrus occidentalis (Chase) Morrone
- Cenchrus orientalis (Rich.) Morrone
- Cenchrus palmeri Vasey – Baja California, Baja California Sur, Sonora, Sinaloa, and Arizona
- Cenchrus pennisetiformis Steud. – Africa, Arabian Peninsula, and Indian Subcontinent
- Cenchrus peruvianus (Trin.) Morrone
- Cenchrus petiolaris (Hochst.) Morrone
- Cenchrus pilcomayensis (Mez) Morrone
- Cenchrus pilosus Kunth – central Mexico to northern Chile
- Cenchrus pirottae (Chiov.) Zon
- Cenchrus platyacanthus Andersson – Galápagos
- Cenchrus prieurii (Kunth) Maire – Sahara, Arabian Peninsula, Indian Subcontinent, and Myanmar
- Cenchrus preslii (Kunth) ined.
- Cenchrus procerus (Stapf) Morrone
- Cenchrus prolificus (Chase) Morrone
- Cenchrus pseudotriticoides (A.Camus) Voronts.
- Cenchrus pumilus (Hack.) ined.
- Cenchrus purpureus (Schumach.) Morrone – Africa and Oman
- Cenchrus qianningensis (S.L.Zhong) Morrone
- Cenchrus ramosus (Hochst.) Morrone
- Cenchrus rigidus (Griseb.) Morrone
- Cenchrus riparius (Hochst. ex A.Rich.) Morrone
- Cenchrus robustus R.D.Webster – Queensland and New South Wales
- Cenchrus rupestris (Chase) Morrone
- Cenchrus sagittatus (Henrard) Morrone
- Cenchrus schweinfurthii (Pilg.) Zon
- Cenchrus setosus Sw. (1788)
- Cenchrus setaceus (Forssk.) Morrone – tender fountain grass, crimson fountaingrass – northern Africa and southwestern Asia; naturalized in Australia, New Zealand, and scattered places in Europe and the Americas
- Cenchrus setiger Vahl – Sahara, East Africa, Arabian Peninsula, Iran, Indian Subcontinent, Myanmar, and Andaman and Nicobar Islands
- Cenchrus shaanxiensis (S.L.Chen & Y.X.Jin) Morrone
- Cenchrus sichuanensis (S.L.Chen & Y.X.Jin) Morrone
- Cenchrus sieberianus (Schltdl.) Verloove
- Cenchrus somalensis Clayton – Somalia
- Cenchrus sphacelatus (Nees) Morrone
- Cenchrus spinifex Cav. – coastal sandbur – North America, South America, and West Indies
- Cenchrus squamulatus (Fresen.) Morrone
- Cenchrus stramineus (Peter) Morrone
- Cenchrus tempisquensis (R.W.Pohl) Morrone
- Cenchrus thulinii (S.M.Phillips) Morrone
- Cenchrus trachyphyllus (Pilg.) Morrone
- Cenchrus tribuloides L. – sanddune sandbur – North America, South America, and West Indies
- Cenchrus trisetus (Leeke) Morrone
- Cenchrus tristachyus (Kunth) Kuntze
- Cenchrus uliginosus (Hack.) ined.
- Cenchrus unisetus (Nees) Morrone
- Cenchrus violaceus (Lam.) Morrone
- Cenchrus weberbaueri (Mez) Morrone
- Cenchrus yemensis (Deflers) Rudov & Akhani

Formerly included

Several species are now considered better suited to other genera: Anthephora, Centotheca, Dactyloctenium, Echinaria, Echinolaena, Hackelochloa, Hilaria, Pennisetum, Phragmites, Scleria, Setaria, Trachys, Tragus, Tribolium.

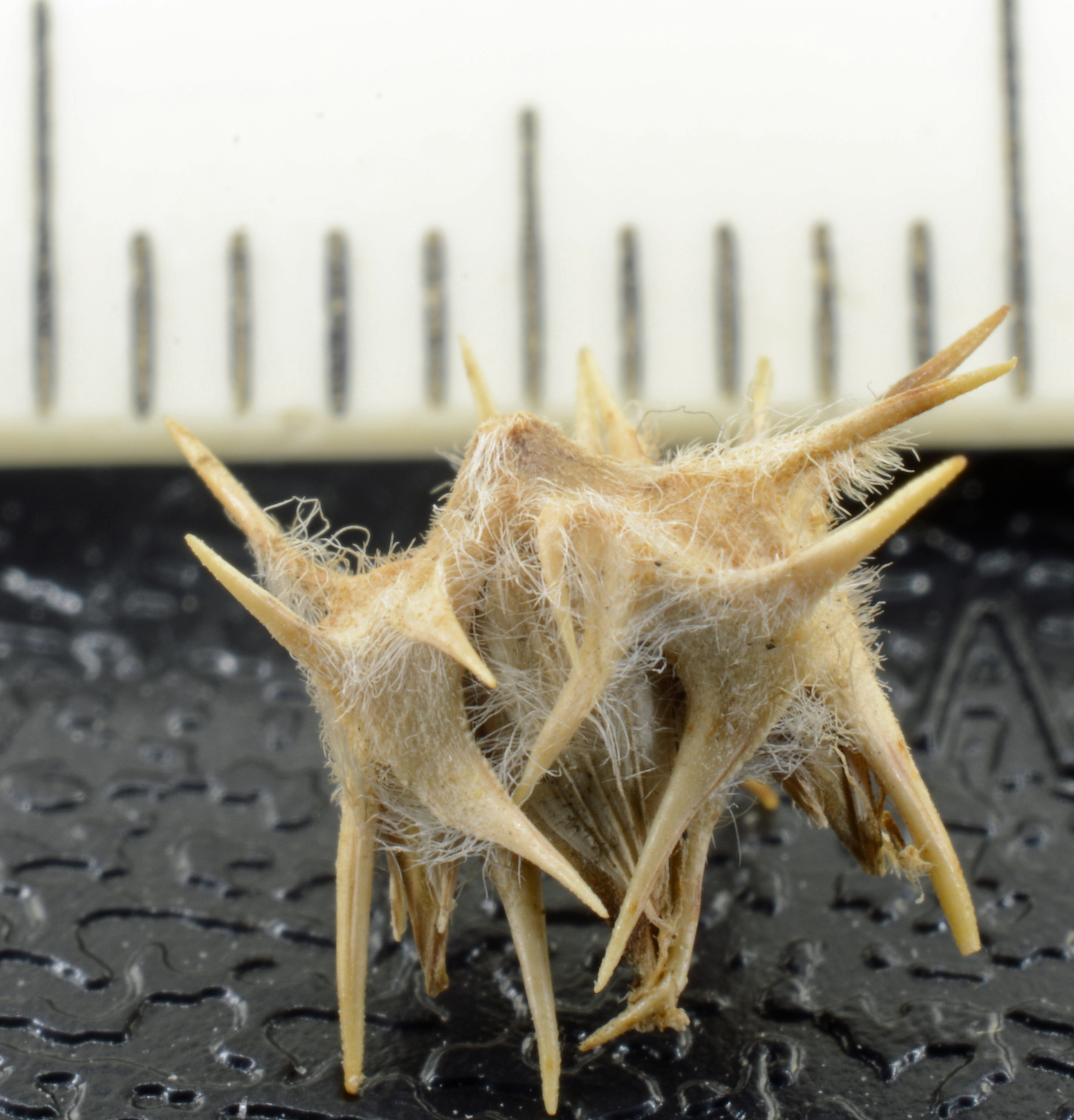
Sand spur in front of a centimeter scale

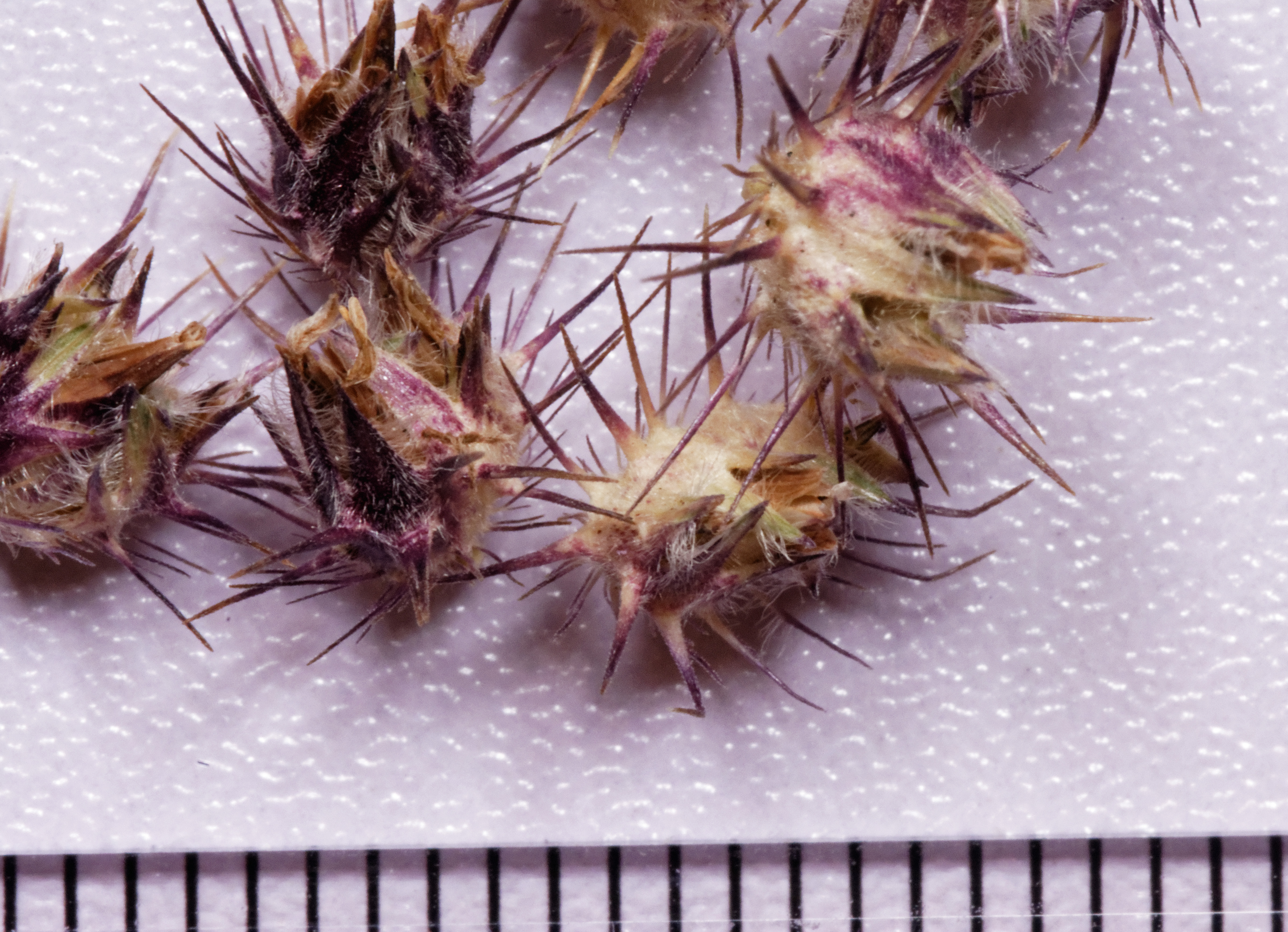
Sandspurs with 1mm markings

== See also ==
- List of Poaceae genera
