= Paspalidium =

Genus of grasses

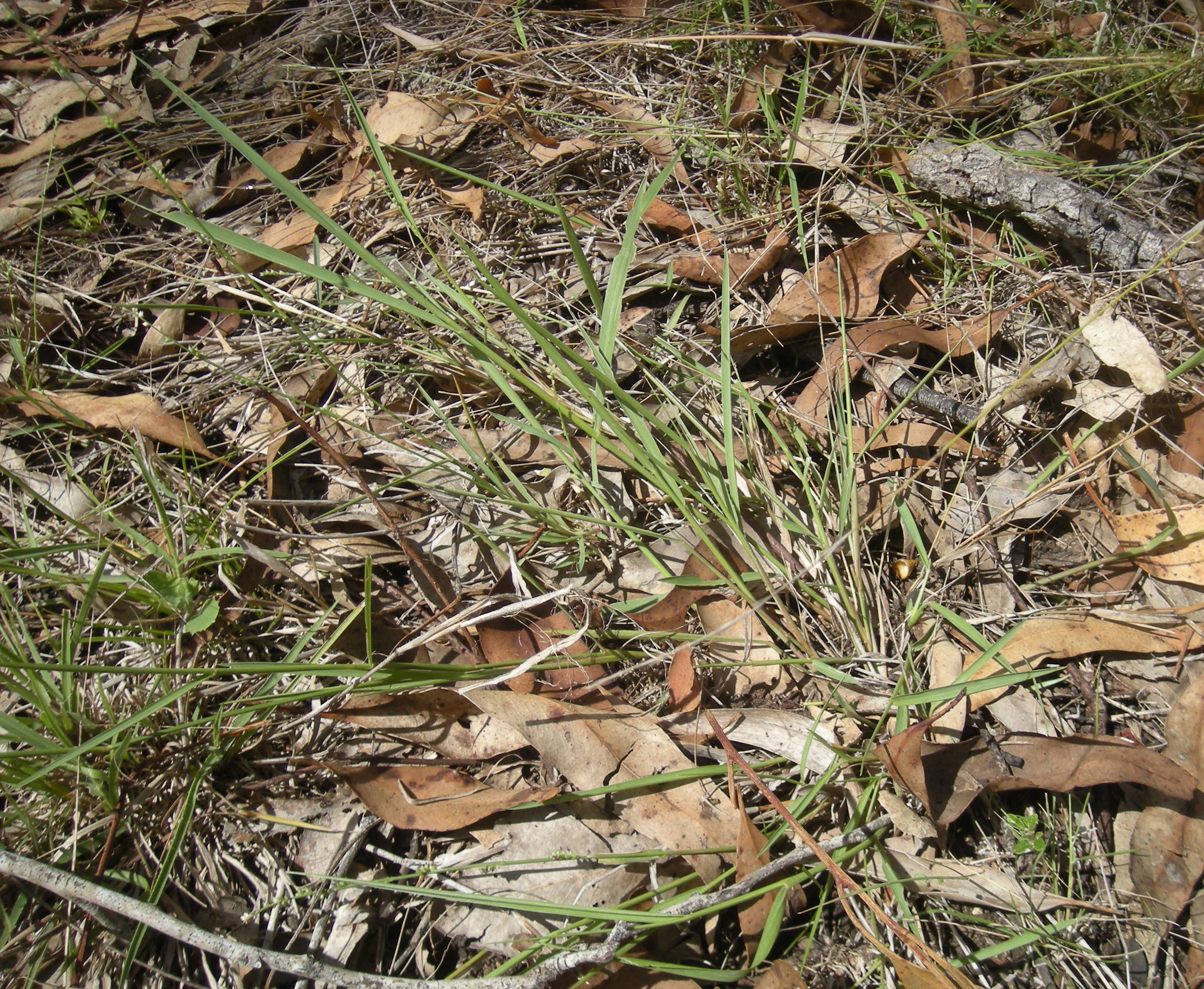
Setaria distans, syn. Paspalidium distans

Paspalidium (watercrown grass) is a formerly accepted genus of tropical and subtropical plants in the grass family. As of June 2024, Plants of the World Online treated it as a synonym of Setaria.

The genus included about 40 species of annuals and perennials native to tropical and subtropical regions of Asia, Africa, Australia, and the Americas.

== Selected former species ==
- Paspalidium basicladum = Setaria basiclada
- Paspalidium caespitosum = Setaria brigalow (brigalow grass)
- Paspalidium distans = Setaria distans
- Paspalidium inaequale = Holcolemma dispar
- Paspalidium punctatum var. longiglume - Setaria media
- Paspalidium semitonsum - Whiteochloa semitonsa
