= Ixophorus =

Scientific classification
- Kingdom: Plantae
- Clade: Tracheophytes
- Clade: Angiosperms
- Clade: Monocots
- Clade: Commelinids
- Order: Poales
- Family: Poaceae
- Subfamily: Panicoideae
- Supertribe: Panicodae
- Tribe: Paniceae
- Subtribe: Cenchrinae
- Genus: Ixophorus; Schltdl. 1861 not Nash 1896
- Species: I. unisetus

Binomial name
- Ixophorus unisetus (J.Presl) Schltdl.

Synonyms
- Urochloa uniseta J.Presl (type species of Ixophorus; Panicum unisetum (J.Presl) Trin.; Setaria uniseta (J.Presl) E.Fourn.; Chamaeraphis uniseta (J.Presl) Kuntze; Ixophorus schiedeanus Schltdl.; Setaria cirrosa E.Fourn. ex Hemsl.; Setaria cirrosa E.Fourn.; Setaria schiedeana (Schltdl.) E.Fourn.; Chamaeraphis cirrosa (E.Fourn.) Kuntze; Chamaeraphis schiedeana (Schltdl.) Kuntze; Panicum palmeri Vasey; Panicum pringlei Vasey; Panicum schiedeanum Trin. ex Beal; Ixophorus pringlei Scribn.; Ixophorus pringlei var. minor Scribn.; Panicum cirrosum (E.Fourn.) Scribn. & Merr.; Setaria polyneura R.A.W.Herrm.; Ixophorus palmeri (Vasey) Beetle

Genus of grasses

Ixophorus is a genus of Latin American plants in the grass family. The only recognized species is Ixophorus unisetus. Some authors have included one or two other species in the genus, such as I. pringlei, but these have more recently been reduced to synonymy. Common names for I. unisetus include crane grass, turkey grass, Honduras grass, Mexican grass, Central America grass, hático (Colombia), zacate blanco (El Salvador, Honduras, Mexico), and zacate chompipe (Nicaragua).

This grass is native to Mexico, Central America, Cuba, Puerto Rico, and Colombia. It is an introduced species in Hawaii.

The grass is variable. It can be annual or perennial, growing up to 1.5 meters tall or remaining much shorter. The stem can be up to a centimeter wide and dry to nearly succulent. The inflorescence is an open panicle with up to 50 branches.

This grass is grown for grazing and hay in some places, such as Costa Rica.

== Taxonomy ==
Several taxa were once regarded as members of Ixophorus but are now regarded as better suited to other genera, such as Pennisetum and Setaria:

- Ixophorus glaucus – Pennisetum glaucum
- Ixophorus glaucus var. laevigatus – Setaria parviflora
- Ixophorus italicus – Setaria italica
- Ixophorus verticillatus – Setaria verticillata
- Ixophorus viridis – Setaria viridis
