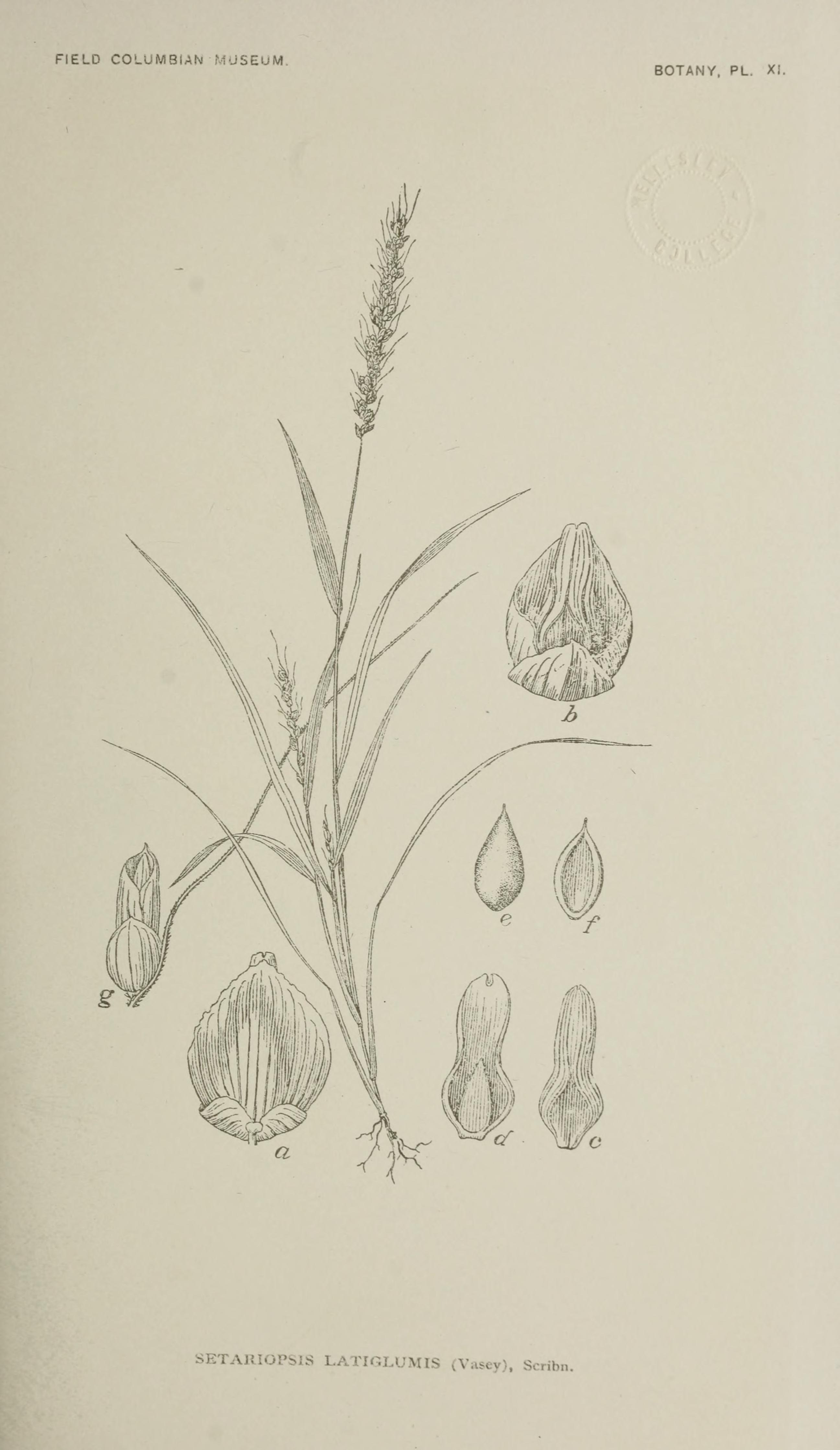
- Setariopsis latiglumis

Scientific classification
- Kingdom: Plantae
- Clade: Tracheophytes
- Clade: Angiosperms
- Clade: Monocots
- Clade: Commelinids
- Order: Poales
- Family: Poaceae
- Subfamily: Panicoideae
- Supertribe: Panicodae
- Tribe: Paniceae
- Subtribe: Cenchrinae
- Genus: Setariopsis; Scribn.

Type species
- Setariopsis latiglumis (Vasey) Scribn.

= Setariopsis =

Genus of grasses

Setariopsis is a genus of New World plants in the grass family.

Species

- Setariopsis auriculata (E.Fourn.) Scribn. - Mexico, Central America, Venezuela, Colombia, Pima County in Arizona
- Setariopsis latiglumis (Vasey) Scribn. - Mexico

formerly included

see Pennisetum Setaria

- Setariopsis glauca - Pennisetum glaucum
- Setariopsis italica - Setaria italica
- Setariopsis verticillata - Setaria verticillata
- Setariopsis viridis - Setaria viridis
