= Bristly foxtail =

Bristly foxtail is a common name for several grasses and may refer to:

- Setaria barbata, native to tropical Africa and tropical Asia
- Setaria verticillata', native to Europe
