= Yellow bristle grass =

Yellow bristle grass or yellow bristlegrass is a common name for several grass species, including:

- Pennisetum glaucum also known as Setaria glauca and Setaria lutescens
- Setaria parviflora, native to North America
- Setaria pumila
