= Plains bristlegrass =

Plains bristlegrass is a common name for several grasses native to North America and may refer to:

- Setaria leucopila
- Setaria texana
- Setaria vulpiseta
