= Dactylispa lenta =

Scientific classification
- Kingdom: Animalia
- Phylum: Arthropoda
- Class: Insecta
- Order: Coleoptera
- Suborder: Polyphaga
- Infraorder: Cucujiformia
- Family: Chrysomelidae
- Genus: Dactylispa
- Species: D. lenta

Binomial name
- Dactylispa lenta Weise, 1902

Species of beetle

Dactylispa lenta is a species of beetle of the family Chrysomelidae. It is found in Congo and Tanzania.

== Life history ==
The recorded host plants for this species are Oryza sativa, Loudetia, Hyparrhenia and Sporobolus species, as well as Setaria chevalieri and Setaria megaphylla.
