= Panicum italicum =

Panicum italicum may refer to two different species of plants:

- Panicum italicum L., a synonym for Setaria italica (L.) P.Beauv. (common name, foxtail millet)
- Panicum italicum Ucria, a synonym (nom. illeg.) for Setaria verticillata (L.) P.Beauv. (common names, hooked bristlegrass; bristly foxtail)
