= Dactylispa melanaria =

Scientific classification
- Kingdom: Animalia
- Phylum: Arthropoda
- Class: Insecta
- Order: Coleoptera
- Suborder: Polyphaga
- Infraorder: Cucujiformia
- Family: Chrysomelidae
- Genus: Dactylispa
- Species: D. melanaria

Binomial name
- Dactylispa melanaria (Motschulsky, 1861)

Synonyms
- Hispa melanaria Motschulsky, 1861; Hispa (Podispa) rufiventris Kraatz, 1895; Dactylispa rufiventris gabunensis Weise, 1897; Dactylispa rufiventris nigriventris Weise, 1922

Species of beetle

Dactylispa melanaria is a species of beetle of the family Chrysomelidae. It is found in Cameroon, Congo, Equatorial Guinea, Guinea, Ivory Coast, Liberia, Nigeria, Rwanda, Sierra Leone, Togo and Uganda.

== Life history ==
The recorded host plants for this species are Setaria palmifolia and Panicum species.
