= Panicum ambiguum =

Panicum ambiguum may refer to four different species of plants:

- Panicum ambiguum (Guss.) Hausskn., a synonym for Setaria verticillata (L.) P.Beauv.
- Panicum ambiguum Trin., a synonym for Urochloa glumaris (Trin.) Veldkamp
- Panicum ambiguum Le Turq., a synonym for Cynodon dactylon (L.) Pers.
- Panicum ambiguum Lapeyr., a synonym for Digitaria sanguinalis (L.) Scop.
