= Dactylispa pubicollis =

Scientific classification
- Kingdom: Animalia
- Phylum: Arthropoda
- Class: Insecta
- Order: Coleoptera
- Suborder: Polyphaga
- Infraorder: Cucujiformia
- Family: Chrysomelidae
- Genus: Dactylispa
- Species: D. pubicollis

Binomial name
- Dactylispa pubicollis (Chapuis, 1877)

Synonyms
- Hispa pubicollis Chapuis, 1877; Dactylispa pubicollis maynei Uhmann, 1931; Dactylispa pubicollis metallica Uhmann, 1936; Hispa dissimilis Péringuey, 1898; Dactylispa contribulis Weise, 1899; Dactylispa andreinii Gestro, 1904

Species of beetle

Dactylispa pubicollis is a species of beetle of the family Chrysomelidae. It is found in Angola, Cameroon, Congo, Equatorial Guinea, Eritrea, Ivory Coast, Kenya, Mozambique, Nigeria, Guinea, Rwanda, South Africa, Tanzania, Togo, Uganda and Zimbabwe.

== Life history ==
The recorded host plants for this species are Commeliniaceae, Scleria, Marantochloa, Jussiaea, Impatiens and Aeschynomene species, as well as Setaria chevalieri, Setaria megaphylla, Sporobolus pyramidalis and Urena lobata.
