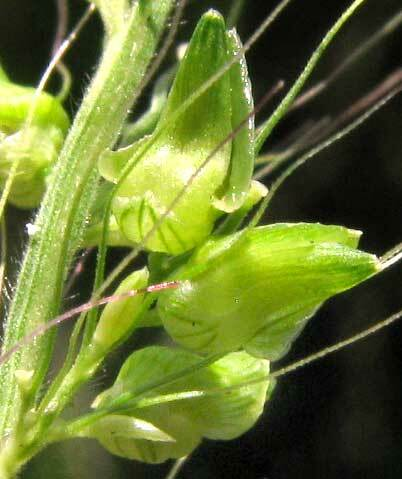
- Setariopsis auriculata with "eared" glumes

Scientific classification
- Kingdom: Plantae
- Clade: Tracheophytes
- Clade: Angiosperms
- Clade: Monocots
- Clade: Commelinids
- Order: Poales
- Family: Poaceae
- Subfamily: Panicoideae
- Genus: Setariopsis
- Species: S. auriculata

Binomial name
- Setariopsis auriculata (E.Fourn.) Scribn. (1896)

Synonyms
- Setaria auriculata E.Fourn. (1886); Chamaeraphis pauciseta (Vasey ex S.Watson) Kuntze (1891); Setaria auriculata var. depauperata E.Fourn. (1886); Setaria pauciseta Vasey ex S.watson (1886); Setariopsis scribneri Mez (1917)

= Setariopsis auriculata =

Eared False Foxtail

Species of grass

Setariopsis auriculata, often known as eared false foxtail, belongs to the grass family, the Poaceae, and within that vast family the subfamily Panicoideae.

== Description ==
Setariopsis auriculata grows to 70cm tall (~28 inches), developing weak stems which may grow upright or lean outwards. Mostly it's hairless but can have a few hairs, especially around the ligules and immediately below the nodes -- the points of attachment of leaves with their stems.

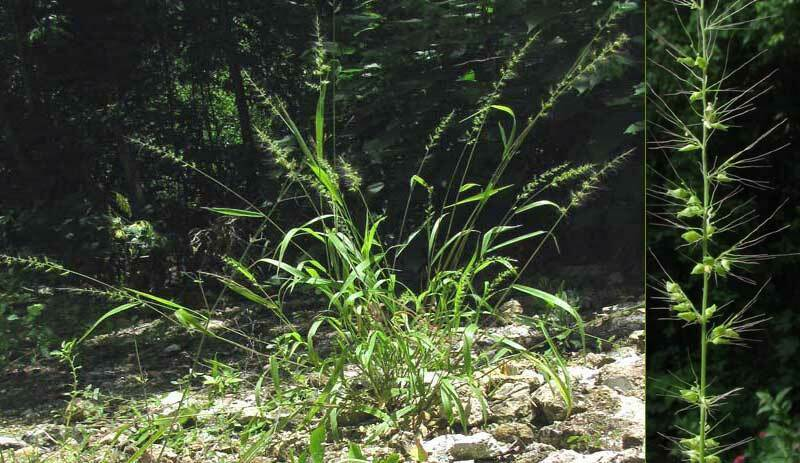
Setariopsis auriculata, plant & bristly inflorescence

Panicle-type inflorescences reach 16cm long x 1.5cm wide (~6⅓ x 0.6 inches). On the spikelets' pedicels arise 3-10 stiff bristles. Spikelets consist of 2 florets, with the lower one usually sterile. The florets' lower glumes are about ¼ as long as the spikelets, with upper glumes slightly shorter than the spikelet; glumes are 5-7 veined. The glory of the glumes is the "ears" on the upper glumes. Technically the ears are referred to as auricles, and they inspire both the common and technical names. They form when upper glumes constrict in such a way that their margins flare out wing-like. On fertile florets, the three anthers are purple.

== Distribution ==
The iNaturalist page showing observations of Setariopsis auriculata indicates that the species occurs uncommonly in western Mexico from the US border south into southern Mexico, including the Yucatan Peninsula; also it may be in Honduras.

Until 2001, Setariopsis auriculata was thought to be endemic just to Mexico. However, in 2001 an observation was published locating it in Pima County, in the US state of Arizona.

== Habitat ==
In the US, Setariopsis auriculata has been found on a north-facing shady bank in a broad, sandy wash at an elevation of 800m (~2600ft).

In Mexico, the plant illustrated on this page inhabited rocky soil on limestone bedrock beside a shady forest and a road in Yucatán state, at an elevation of ~39m (~128ft)

== Taxonomy ==
Within the subfamily Panicoideae, Setariopsis auriculata is assigned to the tribe Paniceae, and the subtribe Cenchrinae, the latter sometimes known as the "bristle clade". The bristle clade is monophyletic and most of its species produce sterile branches or bristles in their inflorescences. The genus Setariopsis comprises just two species and is endemic from the USA south to Colombia and Venezuela. A 2023 study based on genetic sequencing and parsimony analyses found that, among the taxa studied, Setaria grisebachii was sister to Setariopsis auriculata, and both grouped next to Zuloagaea bulbosa.

== Etymology ==
In the genus name Setariopsis, the ending -opsis originates in Ancient Greek, but has been incorporated into the New Latin used in scientific literature, meaning "looks like" or "similar to"; here it means "similar to the genus Setaria", whose species often are known as foxtails or bristle grasses.

The species name auriculata, is from the latin auricula, meaning "small ear: with lobes, lobed like an ear".
