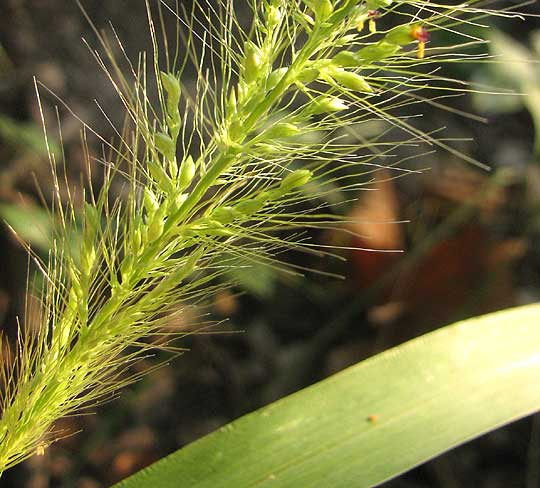

Scientific classification
- Kingdom: Plantae
- Clade: Embryophytes
- Clade: Tracheophytes
- Clade: Spermatophytes
- Clade: Angiosperms
- Clade: Monocots
- Clade: Commelinids
- Order: Poales
- Family: Poaceae
- Subfamily: Panicoideae
- Genus: Setaria
- Species: S. scheelei

Binomial name
- Setaria scheelei (Steud.) Hitchc.

Synonyms
- Chaetochloa polystachya Scribn. & Merr.; Chaetochloa scheelei (Steud.) Hitchc.; Panicum scheelei Steud.; Alopecurus geniculatus Lindh. ex Scheele; Setaria polystachya Scheele

= Setaria scheelei =

Species of plant

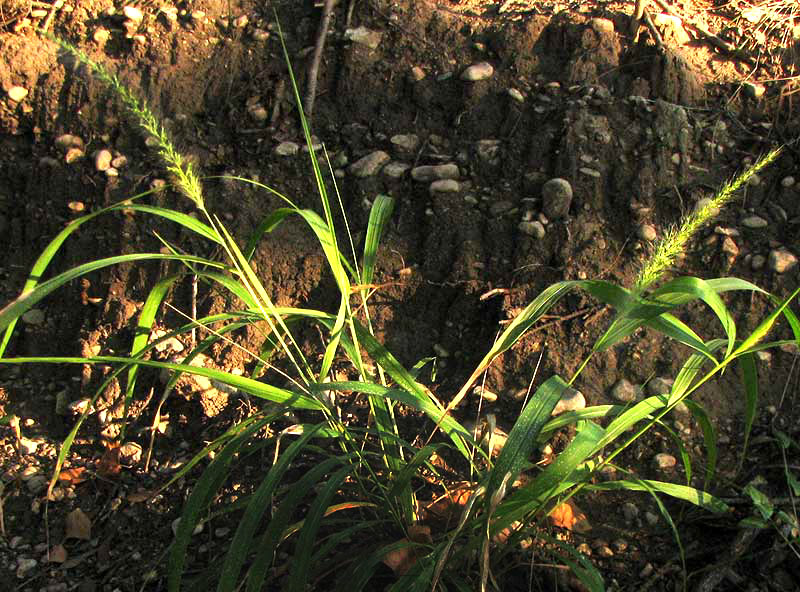
Southwestern bristlegrass in cliff-face habitat

Setaria scheelei, the southwestern bristlegrass is a species of the true grasses native to drier, hotter parts of the Southwestern United States and Mexico.

== Description ==
Southwestern bristlegrass is similar to numerous other grass species known as bristlegrasses, foxtails or foxtail-millets, all with relatively large inflorescences of the branched panicle type and exhibiting conspicuous bristles. It is considered a polymorphic species with a robust aspect. Here are other notable features distinguishing the species:

- It is a perennial grass growing in clumps standing up to 1.3 m (4 ft 3 in) tall. Stem bases usually bend abruptly at a sharp angle.
- Leaf blades up to 20 mm (3/4 in) wide are usually flat and covered with hairlike trichomes.
- Inflorescences are relatively narrow, only moderately dense, cylindrical, and usually strongly tapered toward the top.
- Spikelets do not occur in pairs, and each spikelet is subtended by 1 or 2 spreading bristles up to 35 mm (1 1/2 in) long; these remain with the inflorescence when the spikelet falls off. The spikelets themselves are up to 2.6 mm (1/8 in) long. The spikelet's upper lemma is tipped with a short, incurved point, and is finely cross-wrinkled.

== Distribution ==
Southwestern bristlegrass is mostly a Mexican species. In the USA it is restricted to the hotter, drier southern half of Texas and southern Arizona. In Mexico it is native in hot, dry areas from the US border south to the states of Oaxaca and Chiapas, but missing in the Baja California peninsula.

== Habitat ==
In Texas, southwestern bristlegrass inhabits fencerows, ravines, and open forests, often in shade. Images on this page show an individual on a vertical cliff wall beside a small stream in southwestern Texas. In the Mexican state of Durango, the species is reported as seldom to rarely occurring in a subtropical area with scrub and mesquite. In the northeastern Mexican state of Coahuila it is considered rare adjacent to vegetation along the Sabinas and San Rodrigo Rivers.

== In gardens ==
Gardeners in Texas may regard southwestern bristlegrass as attractive with decorative seedheads whose seeds are fed on by birds and small mammals. It grows best in shaded landscapes, and is highly resistant to deer. The species may die back during droughts. To plant, shake out ripe seedheads over the proposed growing spot. The species's roots may penetrate to about 2.5 m (8 ft 2 in). Caterpillars of most species of Branded Skippers and Satyrs feed on the plant.

== Taxonomy ==
The basionym for Setaria scheelei is Panicum scheelei Steud., which in 1853 was formally described and published by Ernst Gottlieb von Steudel.

Setaria scheelei has been assigned to subgenus Setaria.

=== Etymology ===
The genus name Setaria is New Latin from the Latin seta meaning "bristle," and aria meaning "possessing," which in combination well describes Setaria species.

The species name scheelei honors George Heinrich Adolf Scheele who named Setaria polystachya, an illegal synonym of Setaria scheelei.
