= Setaria globoidea =

Scientific classification
- Kingdom: Plantae
- Clade: Embryophytes
- Clade: Tracheophytes
- Clade: Spermatophytes
- Clade: Angiosperms
- Clade: Monocots
- Clade: Commelinids
- Order: Poales
- Family: Poaceae
- Subfamily: Panicoideae
- Genus: Setaria
- Species: S. globoidea

Binomial name
- Setaria globoidea (Domin) R.D.Webster

Synonyms
- Panicum globoideum Domin; Paspalidium globoideum (Domin) Hughes

Species of plant

Setaria globoidea, synonym Paspalidium globoideum, is an Australian species of flowering plant in the family Poaceae, native to Queensland and New South Wales. It was first described by Karel Domin in 1911 as Panicum globoideum. It is known as sago grass, and shotgrass.
