= Setaria cernua =

Conservation status
- Least Concern (IUCN 3.1)

Scientific classification
- Kingdom: Plantae
- Clade: Tracheophytes
- Clade: Angiosperms
- Clade: Monocots
- Clade: Commelinids
- Order: Poales
- Family: Poaceae
- Subfamily: Panicoideae
- Genus: Setaria
- Species: S. cernua

Binomial name
- Setaria cernua Kunth

Synonyms
- Chaetochloa cernua (Kunth) Hitchc.; Panicum cernuum (Kunth) Willd. ex Spreng.; Panicum stenothyrsum Pilg.

Species of grass

Setaria cernua is a species of grass in the family Poaceae. It is endemic to Ecuador, where it occurs in Imbabura, Carchi and Chimborazo Provinces. Some populations are protected in the Parque Nacional Llanganates, the Parque Nacional Sangay, and the Reserva Ecológica Cayambe-Coca. While its range is limited, it is common there.
