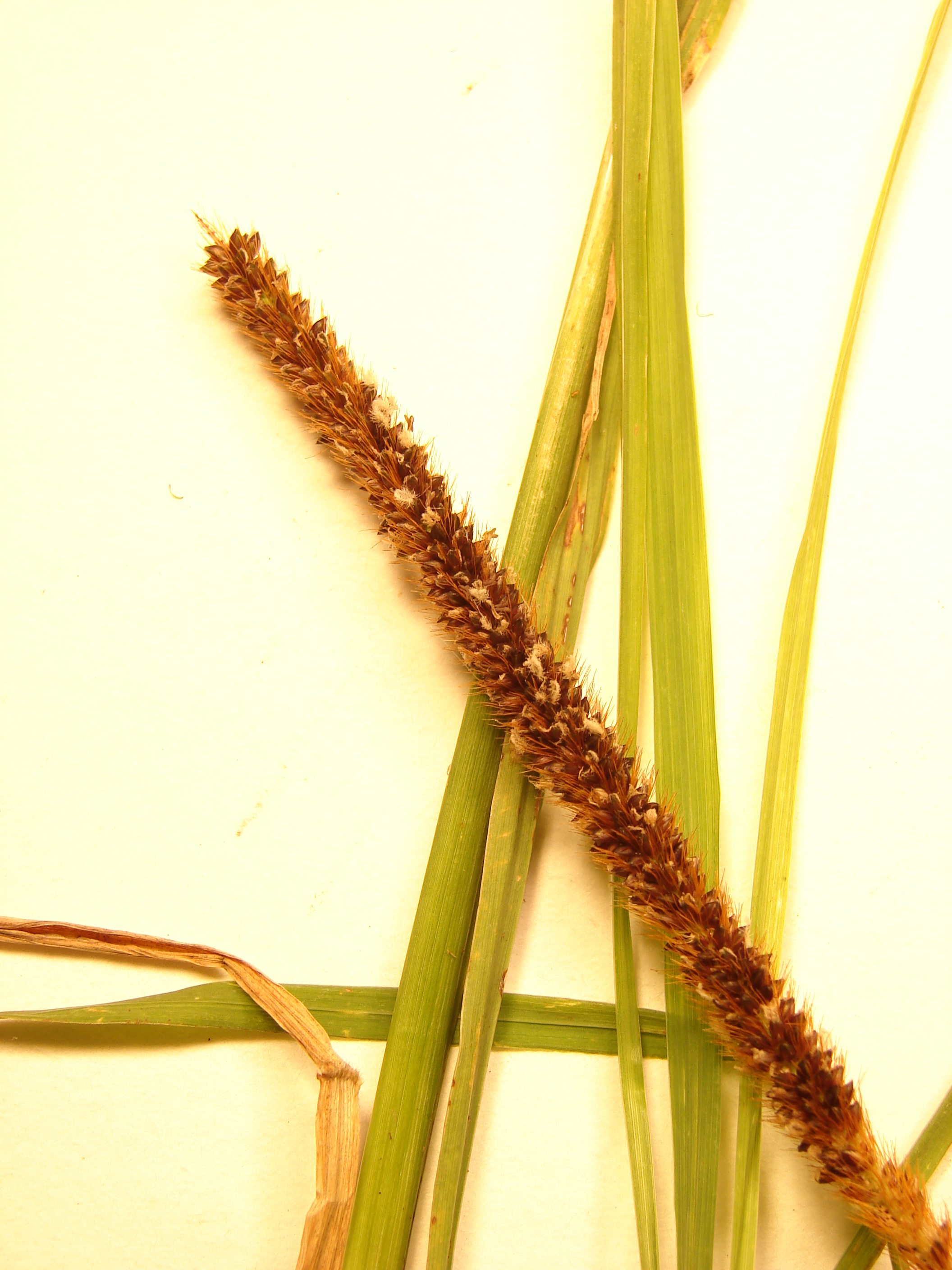

Scientific classification
- Kingdom: Plantae
- Clade: Tracheophytes
- Clade: Angiosperms
- Clade: Monocots
- Clade: Commelinids
- Order: Poales
- Family: Poaceae
- Subfamily: Panicoideae
- Genus: Setaria
- Species: S. sphacelata

Binomial name
- Setaria sphacelata (Schumach.) Stapf & C.E.Hubb. ex M.B.Moss

Synonyms
- Chaetochloa aurea (A.Braun) Hitchc.; Panicum aureum (Hochst. ex A.Br.) Nees nom. illeg.; Panicum chrysanthum Steud.; Panicum rudimentosum Steud.; Panicum sphacelatum Schumach. nom. illeg.; Pennisetum aureum A.Rich. nom. illeg.; Setaria almaspicata de Wit; Setaria alpestris Peter; Setaria anceps Stapf; Setaria anceps Stapf ex Massey; Setaria angustifolia Stapf; Setaria aurea Hochst. ex A.Braun; Setaria bussei R.A.W.Herrm.; Setaria cana de Wit; Setaria chrysantha (Steud.) Heynh. nom. illeg.; Setaria decipiens de Wit nom. illeg.; Setaria flabellata Stapf; Setaria flabelliformis de Wit; Setaria homblei De Wild.; Setaria laxispica Stapf; Setaria myosuroides Peter; Setaria neglecta de Wit; Setaria perennis Hack. nom. illeg.; Setaria planifolia Stapf; Setaria rudimentosa (Steud.) T.Durand & Schinz; Setaria scalaris Peter; Setaria splendida Stapf; Setaria stenantha Stapf; Setaria stolzii Stapf; Setaria tenuispica Stapf & C.E.Hubb.; Setaria torta Stapf; Setaria trinervia Stapf

= Setaria sphacelata =

Species of grass

Setaria sphacelata is a tall African grass, also known as South African pigeon grass and African bristlegrass. It is native to tropical and subtropical Africa, and is extensively cultivated globally as a pasture grass and for cut fodder. This is a rhizomatous perennial grass producing flattened, hairless, blue-green stems up to 2 m tall. The inflorescence is a dense, narrow panicle of bristly, orange-tinged spikelets up to 25 cm long.

In Africa, Setaria sphacelata seed heads are an important food source for several bird species, including the long-tailed widowbird.

Commercial cultivars have been developed for various climates and soil conditions. All cultivars are high in oxalate, making them generally unsuitable for horses. Recognised pests in cultivation include the buffel grass seed caterpillar (Mampava rhodoneura) and the fungus Pyricularia trisa.

Setaria sphacelata is a good quality forage for ruminants such as cattle, sheep and goats. It can be fed fresh and ensiled.

Setaria sphacelata has become naturalised in many countries and is a significant environmental weed in three Australian states.
