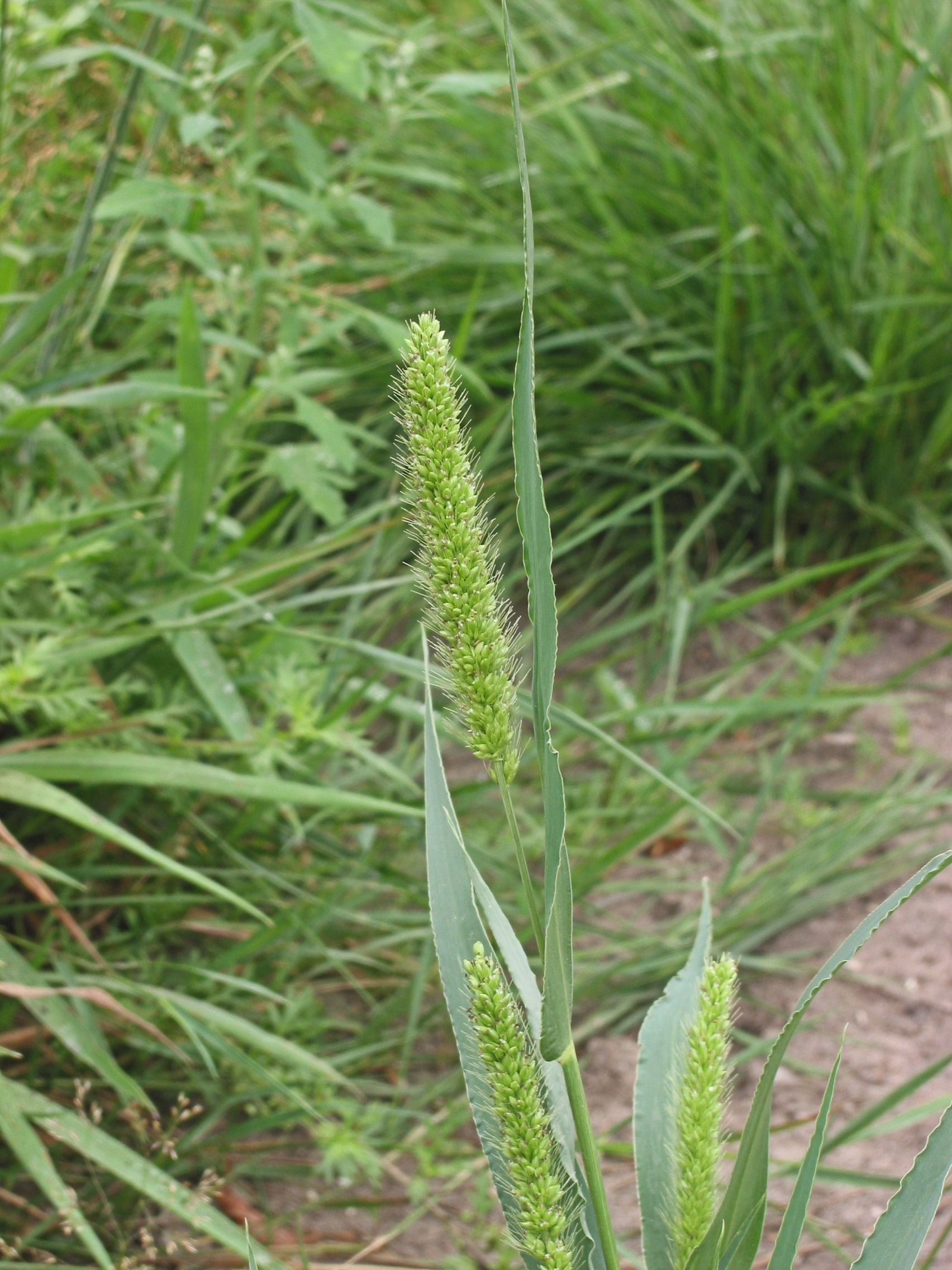

Scientific classification
- Kingdom: Plantae
- Clade: Tracheophytes
- Clade: Angiosperms
- Clade: Monocots
- Clade: Commelinids
- Order: Poales
- Family: Poaceae
- Subfamily: Panicoideae
- Genus: Setaria
- Species: S. viridis

Binomial name
- Setaria viridis (L.) P.Beauv.

Synonyms
- Setaria pycnocoma (Steud.) Henrard ex Nakai

= Setaria viridis =

Species of grass

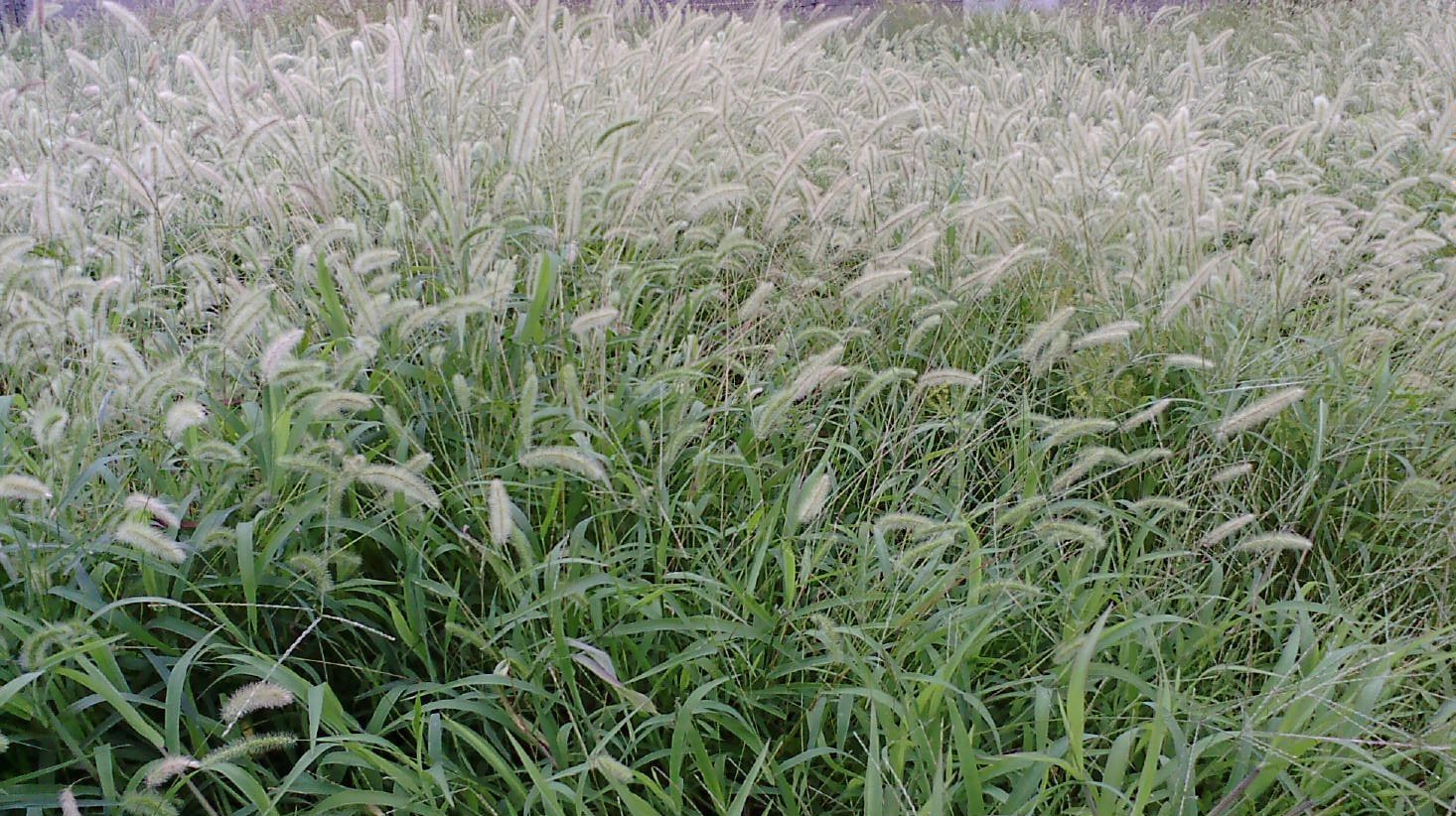
Clumping Setaria viridis, Chiba Japan

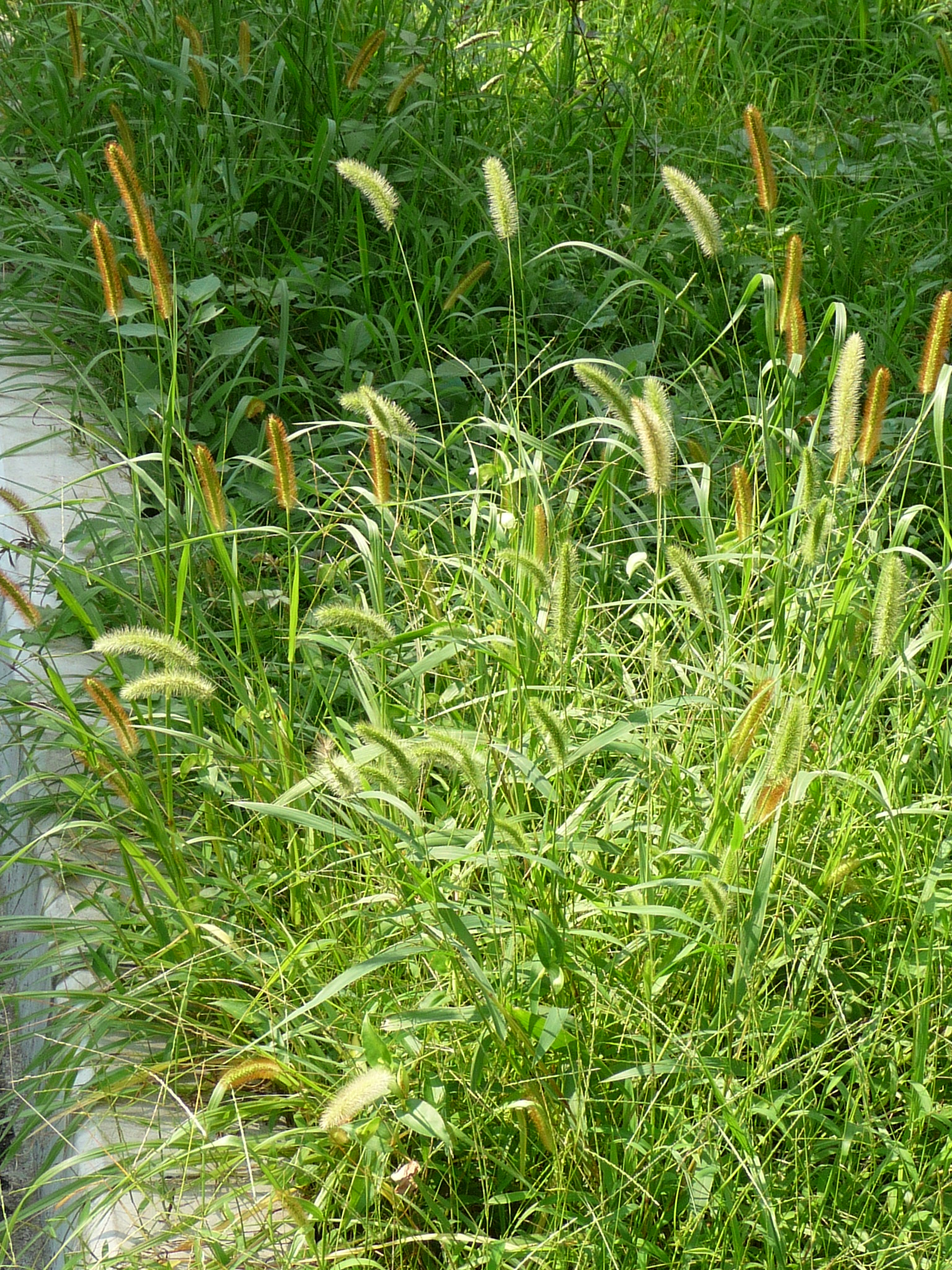
Symbiosis of Setaria viridis and Setaria pumila, Chiba Japan in 2008

Setaria viridis is a species of grass known by many common names, including green foxtail, green bristlegrass, and wild foxtail millet. It is sometimes considered a subspecies of Setaria italica. It is native to Eurasia, but it is known on most continents as an introduced species and is closely related to Setaria faberi, a noxious weed. It is a hardy grass which grows in many types of urban, cultivated, and disturbed habitat, including vacant lots, sidewalks, railroads, lawns, and at the margins of fields. It is the wild antecedent of the crop foxtail millet.

This is an annual grass with decumbent or erect stems growing up to a meter long, and known to reach two meters or more at times. The leaf blades are up to 40 centimeters long and 2.5 wide and glabrous. The inflorescence is a dense, compact, spikelike panicle up to 20 centimeters long, growing erect or sometimes nodding at the tip only. Spikelets are 1.8–2.2 mm long. Each is subtended by up to three stiff bristles. Its fertile lemmas are finely cross-wrinkled.

Setaria viridis is often confused with S. faberi, (Chinese or Giant Foxtail); which has sparse, soft hairs on the leaves and a nodding inflorescence; and S. pumila, which has spare, soft hairs on the leaves and an erect inflorescence. Setaria viridis is closely related to S. italica (Foxtail Millet), which has larger spikelets about 3 mm long and usually smooth, shiny upper lemmas. Foxtail Millet was cultivated in China by 2700 BC and during the Stone Age in Europe.

Setaria viridis has been proposed as a model to study C4 photosynthesis and related bioenergy grasses. It has a short life cycle (6–8 weeks), is transformable and is currently being sequenced. Genetic resources are currently being developed by a number of groups. A method to break the prolonged seed dormancy has been discovered recently and all these could contribute towards making S. viridis a choice monocot genetic model system.
