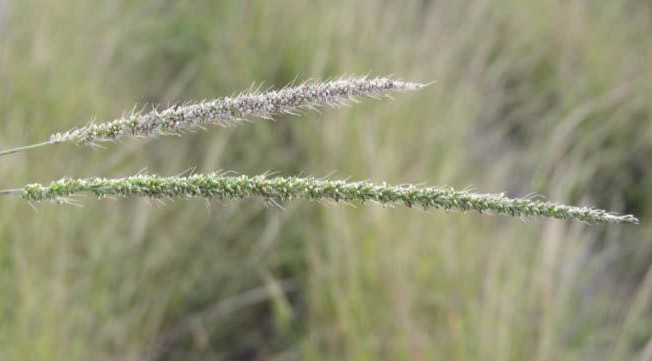

Scientific classification
- Kingdom: Plantae
- Clade: Tracheophytes
- Clade: Angiosperms
- Clade: Monocots
- Clade: Commelinids
- Order: Poales
- Family: Poaceae
- Subfamily: Panicoideae
- Genus: Setaria
- Species: S. vulpiseta

Binomial name
- Setaria vulpiseta (Lam.) Roem. & Schult.

Synonyms
- Chaetochloa amplifolia (Steud.) Scribn.; Chaetochloa composita (Kunth) Scribn.; Chaetochloa trichorhachis (Hack.) Hitchc.; Chaetochloa vulpiseta (Lam.) Hitchc. & Chase; Chamaeraphis composita (Kunth) Kuntze; Panicum amplifolium Steud.; Panicum compositum (Kunth) Nees nom. illeg.; Panicum macrourum Trin.; Panicum subsphaerocarpum Schltdl.; Panicum vulpisetum Lam.; Setaria alopecurus Fisch. ex Trin. nom. inval.; Setaria composita Kunth; Setaria lancifolia R.A.W.Herrm.; Setaria macrostachya Hochst. ex Steud. nom. inval.; Setaria reversipila R.A.W.Herrm.; Setaria trichorhachis (Hack.) R.C.Foster

= Setaria vulpiseta =

Species of plant

Setaria vulpiseta is a species of grass known by the common name plains bristlegrass. It is native to North America, where it occurs in Texas to Colorado to Arizona in the United States and northern and central Mexico.

This perennial grass grows up to 3 to 4 feet tall. It is yellow in color when mature. The hairy leaves are up to 10 inches long and have a ligule of hairs. The inflorescence is up to 5 inches long and is very narrow.

This grass is a common forage in the American southwest. It is good grazing for livestock. The seed provides food for wildlife. Its natural habitat is dry rangeland as well as low plains that receive flooding.
