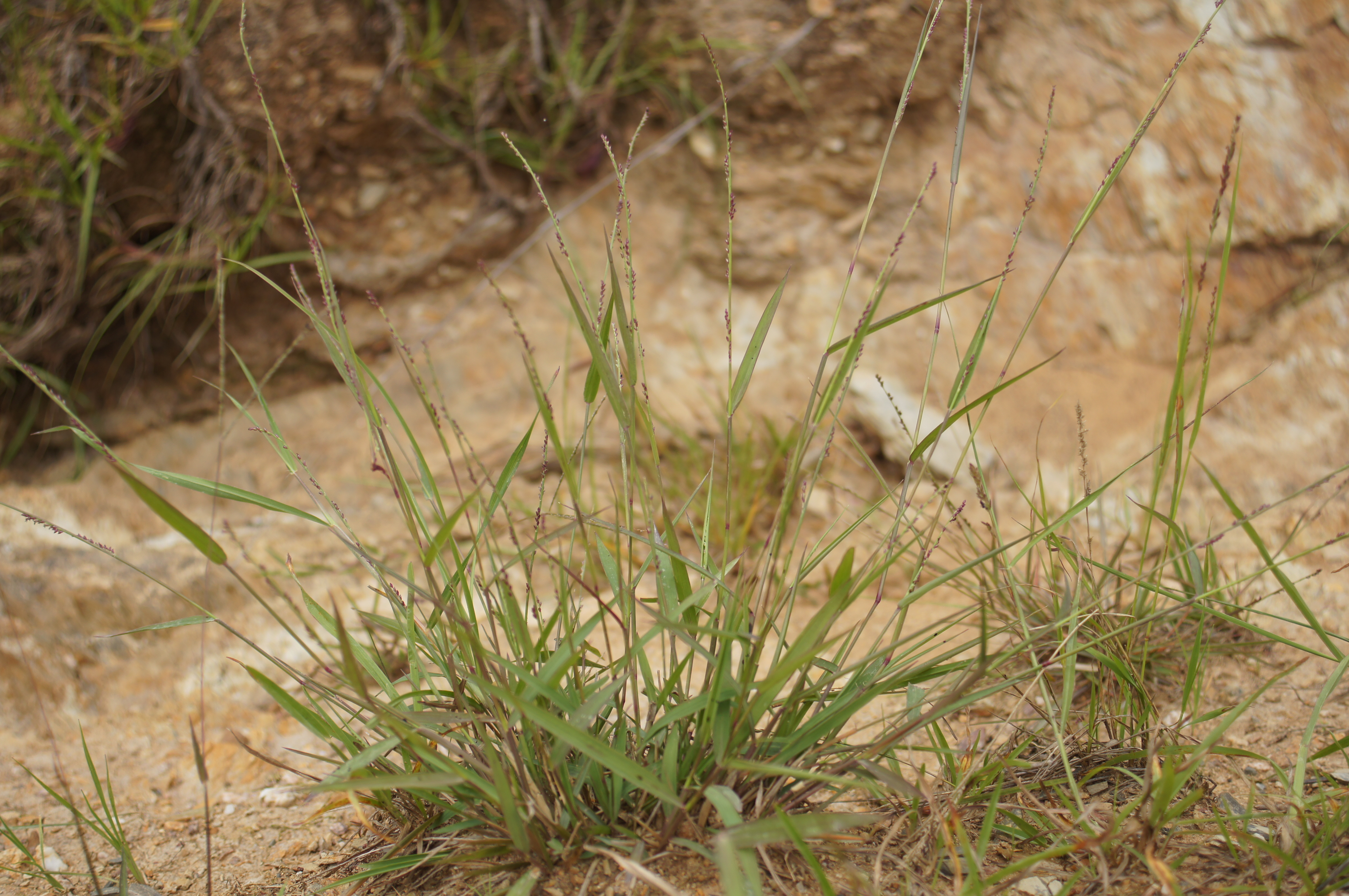
- Growing in New South Wales

Scientific classification
- Kingdom: Plantae
- Clade: Tracheophytes
- Clade: Angiosperms
- Clade: Monocots
- Clade: Commelinids
- Order: Poales
- Family: Poaceae
- Subfamily: Panicoideae
- Genus: Setaria
- Species: S. distans

Binomial name
- Setaria distans (Trin.) Veldkamp

Synonyms
- Panicum commixtum Steud.; Panicum distans Trin.; Panicum pacificum Tuyama, nom. illeg.; Panicum radiatius H.St.John; Panicum tuyamae Ohwi, pro syn.; Paspalidium disjunctum S.T.Blake; Paspalidium distans (Trin.) Hughes; Paspalidium radiatum Vickery; Paspalidium scabrifolium S.T.Blake; Paspalidium tuyamae Ohwi; Setaria scabrifolia (S.T.Blake) R.D.Webster, nom. illeg.

= Setaria distans =

Species of plant

Setaria distans, synonyms including Paspalidium distans, is a species of flowering plant in the grass family Poaceae, native to New Caledonia, New Guinea, most of Australia and the Bonin Islands (Ogasawara-shoto). It was first described by Carl Bernhard von Trinius in 1829 as Panicum distans.

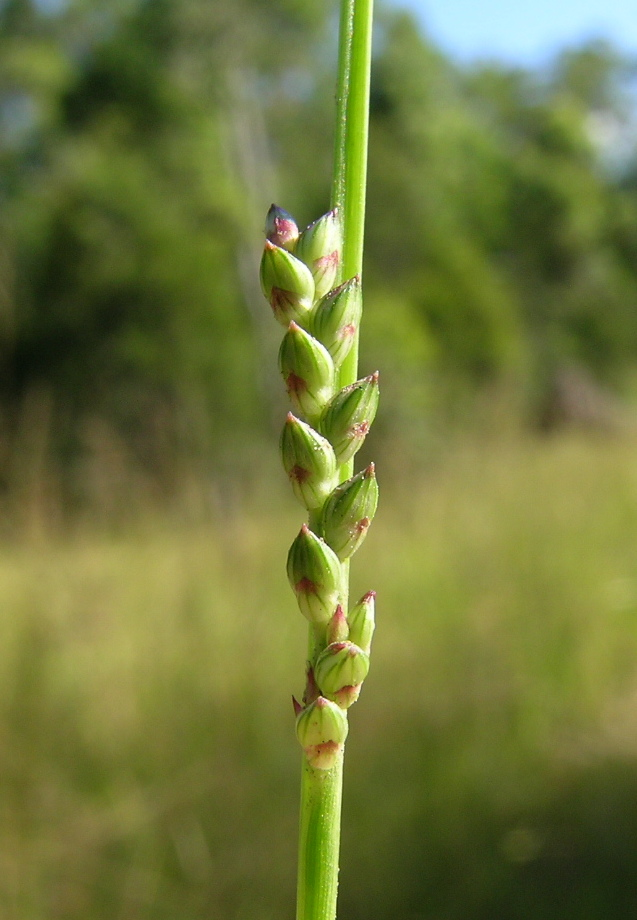
Spikelets
