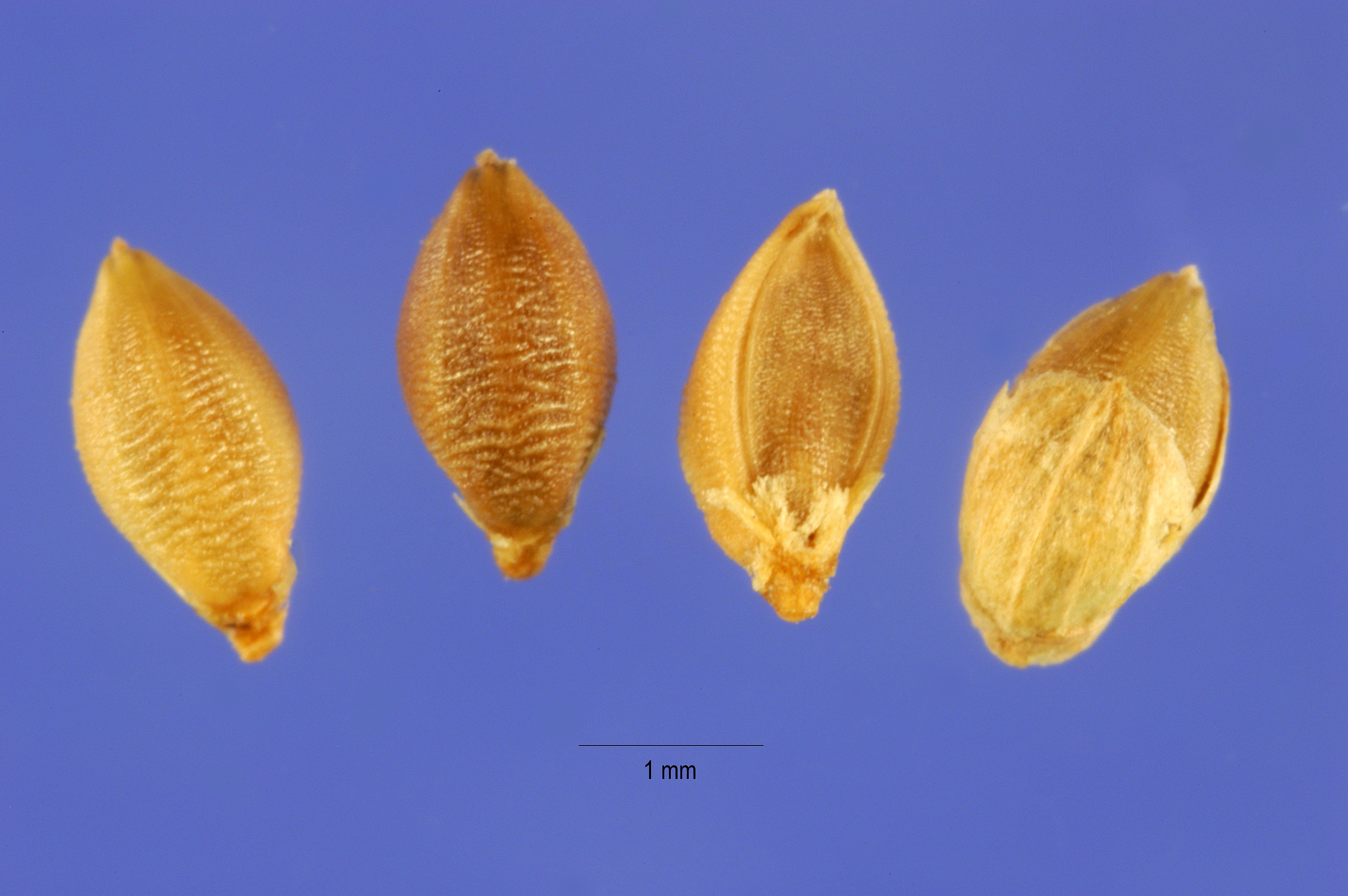
- Seeds

Scientific classification
- Kingdom: Plantae
- Clade: Tracheophytes
- Clade: Angiosperms
- Clade: Monocots
- Clade: Commelinids
- Order: Poales
- Family: Poaceae
- Subfamily: Panicoideae
- Genus: Setaria
- Species: S. leucopila

Binomial name
- Setaria leucopila (Scribn. & Merr.) K. Schum.

Synonyms
- Chaetochloa leucopila Scribn. & Merril; Setaria commutata Hack.

= Setaria leucopila =

Species of flowering plant

Setaria leucopila, commonly known as streambed bristlegrass or plains bristlegrass, is a perennial prairie grass that is native to the southern plains of the United States.

== Description ==
It reaches a height of 4 to 39 in (10 to 99 cm). Although good forage for livestock, it is only fair for wildlife use. It reproduces by seeds and tillers.
