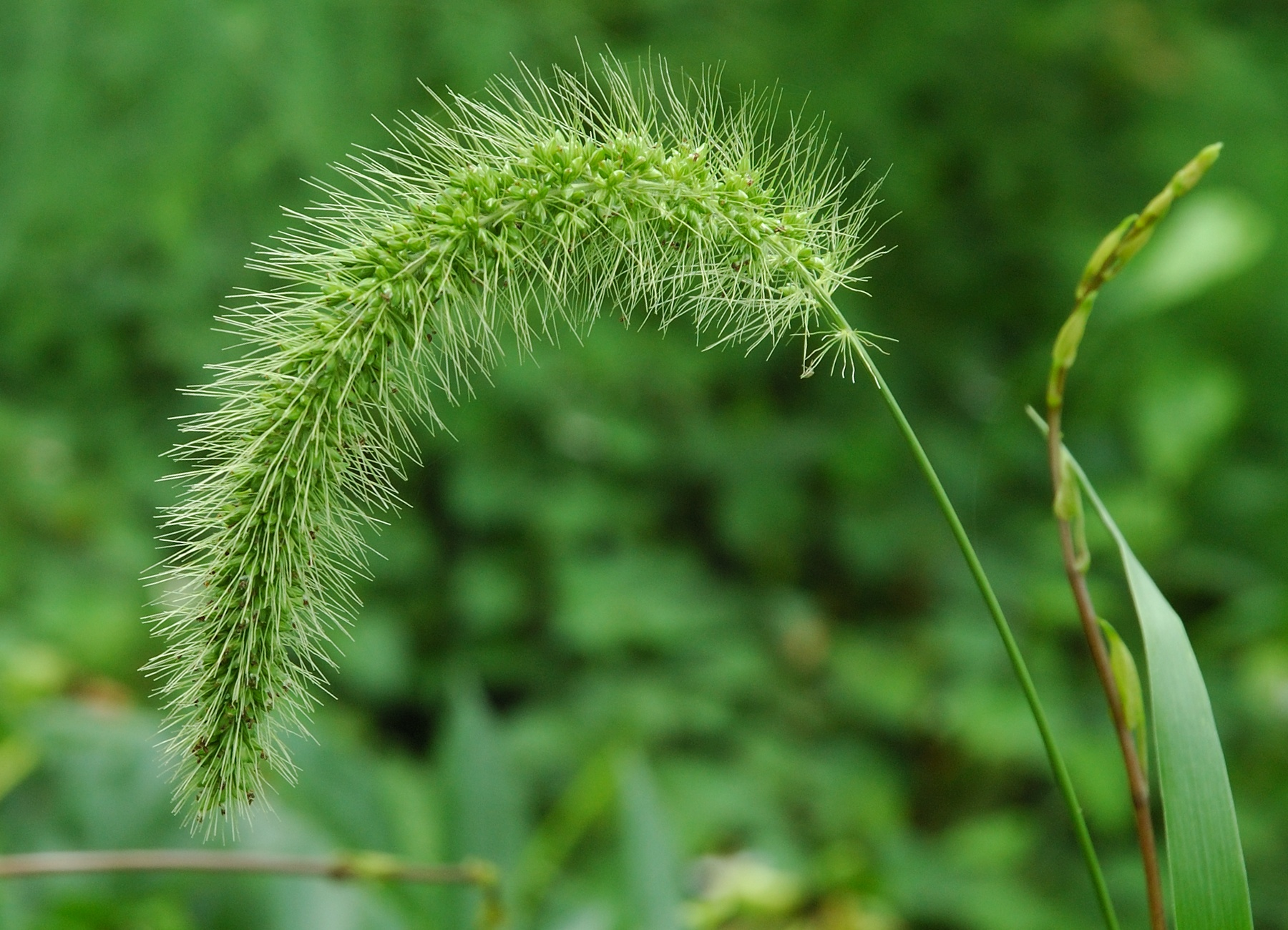

Scientific classification
- Kingdom: Plantae
- Clade: Tracheophytes
- Clade: Angiosperms
- Clade: Monocots
- Clade: Commelinids
- Order: Poales
- Family: Poaceae
- Subfamily: Panicoideae
- Genus: Setaria
- Species: S. faberi

Binomial name
- Setaria faberi Herrm.

Synonyms
- Setaria autumnalis Ohwi; Setaria macrocarpa Luchnik

= Setaria faberi =

Species of grass

Setaria faberi, the Japanese bristlegrass, nodding bristle-grass, Chinese foxtail, Chinese millet, giant bristlegrass, giant foxtail or nodding foxtail, is an Asian grass. It is a summer annual, with plants emerging from seeds in the spring, and setting seeds in the late summer or fall.

Giant foxtails prefer compacted soils, high in nitrogen and phosphorus. The plant gains a competitive edge on crops as the soil pH increases.

== As a weed ==
Giant foxtail has been introduced to North America, where it is a widespread weed. It is a significant pest of maize/corn, reducing crop yields by 13–14% at average plant distributions. Mechanical control of giant foxtails by night tillage, rotary hoeing, or flaming is very difficult. Crop rotation with two years of alfalfa effectively reduces giant foxtail populations. Herbicides can effectively control the plant when it is growing amongst broadleaf crops, but are less effective when it is infesting maize/corn because they are both Poaceae.
