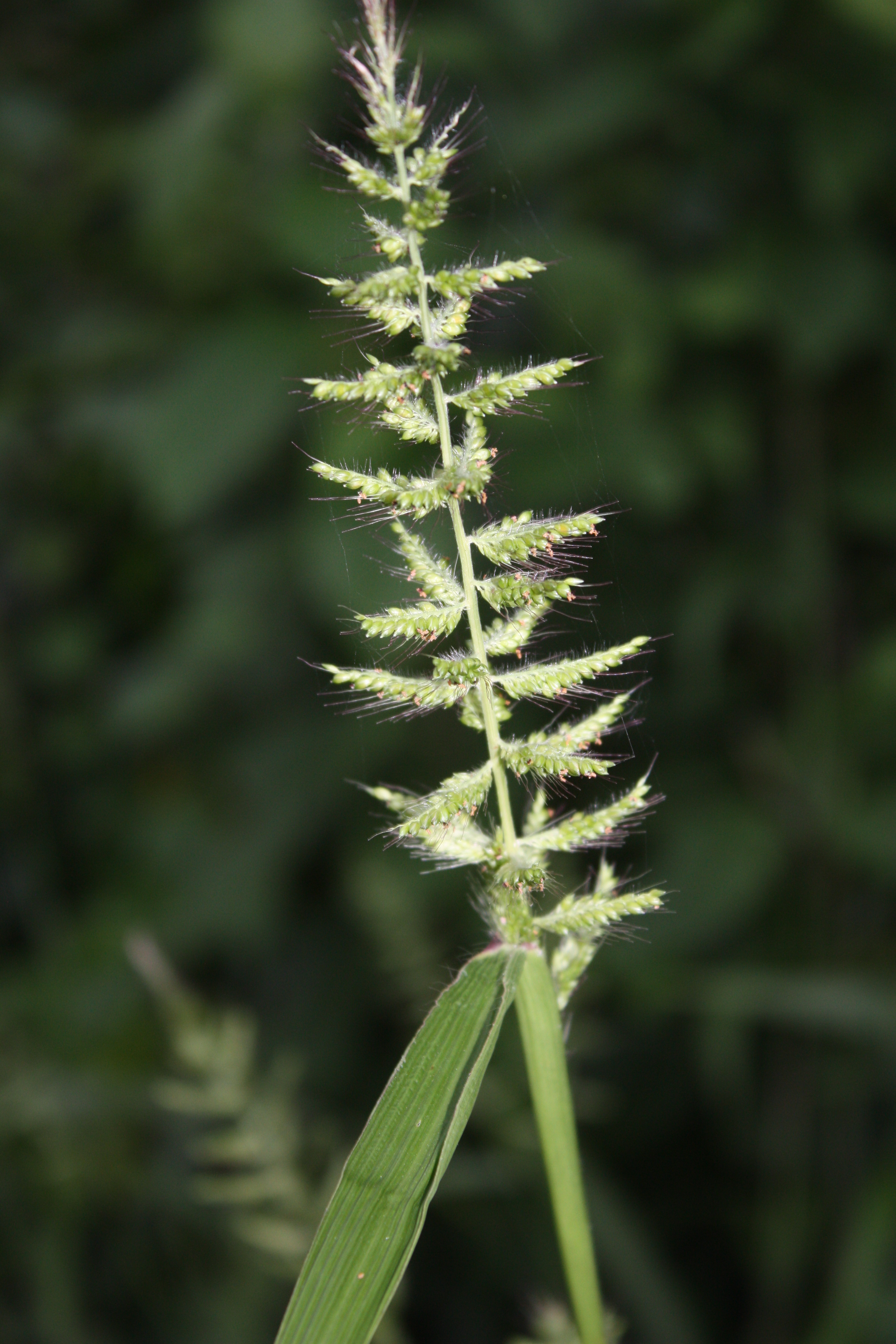

Scientific classification
- Kingdom: Plantae
- Clade: Tracheophytes
- Clade: Angiosperms
- Clade: Monocots
- Clade: Commelinids
- Order: Poales
- Family: Poaceae
- Subfamily: Panicoideae
- Genus: Setaria
- Species: S. barbata

Binomial name
- Setaria barbata (Lam.) Kunth

Synonyms
- Chaetochloa barbata (Lam.) Hitchc. & Chase; Chaetochloa costata (Roxb.) Skeels; Chamaeraphis costata (Roxb.) Kuntze; Chamaeraphis rhachitricha (Hochst.) Kuntze; Chamaeraphis viatica (Salzm. ex Döll) Kuntze; Panicum barbatum Lam.; Panicum basisetum Steud.; Panicum costatum Roxb.; Panicum lineatum Schumach.; Panicum mauritianum Willd. ex Spreng. nom. inval.; Panicum nakaianum Honda; Panicum rarisetum Steud.; Panicum rhachitrichum Hochst.; Panicum viaticum Salzm. ex Döll; Setaria basiseta (Steud.) T.Durand & Schinz; Setaria costata Vanderyst nom. inval.; Setaria flaccifolia Stapf; Setaria mauritiana Spreng.; Setaria nakaiana (Honda) Ohwi; Setaria rhachitricha (Hochst.) Rendle; Setaria viscidula Desv.; Urochloa mauritiana (Spreng.) Bojer

= Setaria barbata =

Species of plant

Setaria barbata, with common names bristly foxtail grass, corn grass, Mary grass, and East Indian bristlegrass, is a species of grass in the family Poaceae native to tropical Africa and tropical Asia.
