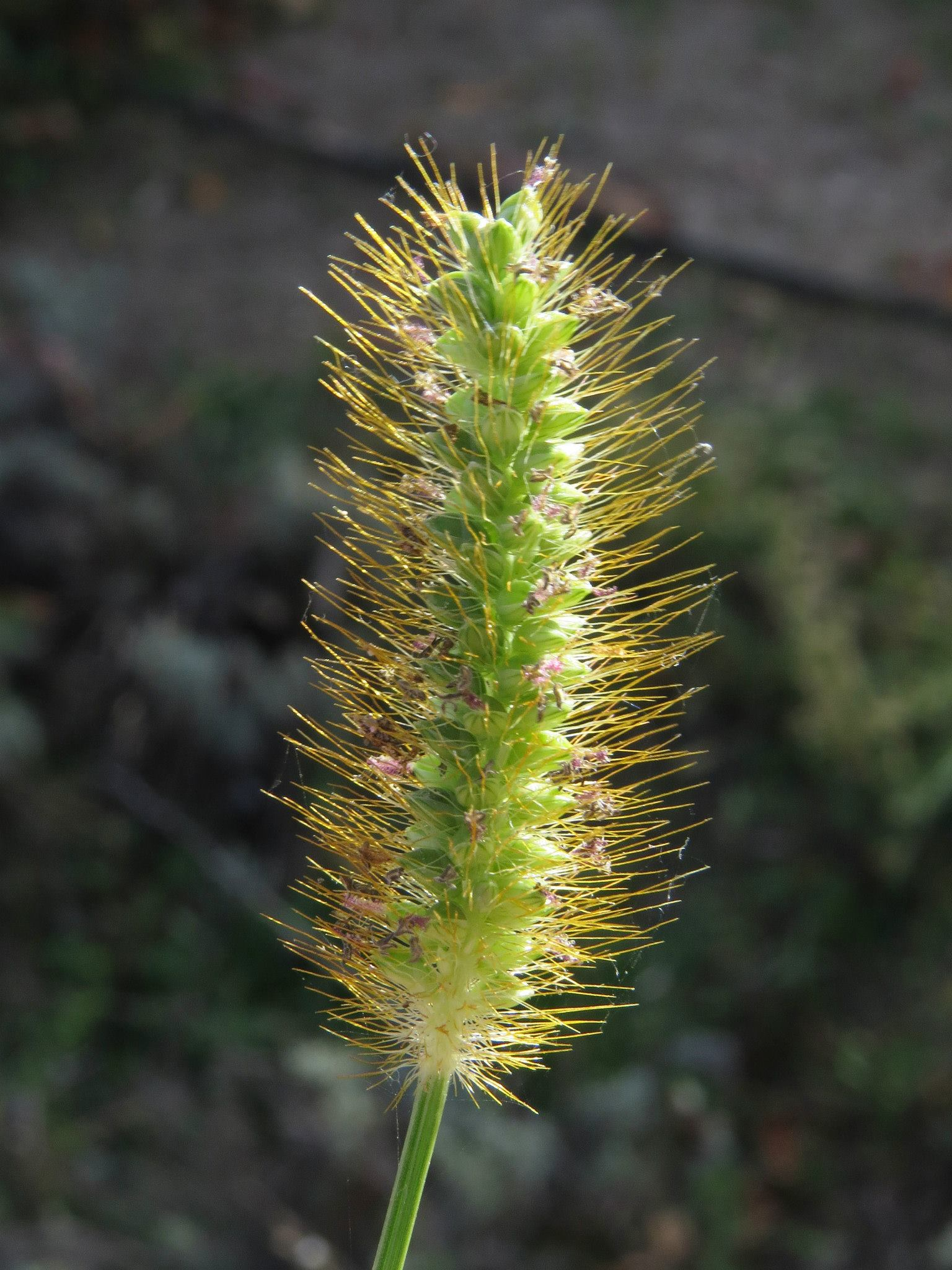

Scientific classification
- Kingdom: Plantae
- Clade: Tracheophytes
- Clade: Angiosperms
- Clade: Monocots
- Clade: Commelinids
- Order: Poales
- Family: Poaceae
- Subfamily: Panicoideae
- Genus: Setaria
- Species: S. pumila

Binomial name
- Setaria pumila (Poir.) Roem. & Schult.

Synonyms
- List: Oplismenus helvolus (L.f.) P.Beauv.; Panicum flavescens Moench nom. illeg.; Panicum helvolum L.f.; Panicum holcoides J.Jacq. nom. illeg.; Panicum luteum Gueldenst. nom. inval.; Panicum pallidifuscum Schumach.; Panicum pumilum Poir.; Panicum rubiginosum Steud.; Pennisetum helvolum (L.f.) R.Br.; Setaria auricoma Link ex A.Braun; Setaria boninensis Nakai nom. inval.; Setaria breviglumis St.-Lag.; Setaria dasyura Schlecht.; Setaria erythraeae Mattei; Setaria helvola (L.f.) Roem. & Schult.; Setaria laeta de Wit; Setaria pallide-fusca (Schumach.) Stapf & C.E. Hubb.; Setaria pallidifusca (Schumach.) Stapf & C.E.Hubb.; Setaria rubiginosa (Steud.) Miq.; Setaria sciuroidea C.Muell.; Setaria ustilata de Wit

= Setaria pumila =

Species of grass

Setaria pumila is a species of grass known by many common names, including yellow foxtail, yellow bristle-grass, pigeon grass, and cattail grass. It is native to Europe, but it is known throughout the world as a common weed. It grows in lawns, sidewalks, roadsides, cultivated fields, and many other places. This annual grass grows 20 centimetres (8 inches) to well over 1 metre (1 yard) in height, its mostly hairless stems ranging from green to purple-tinged in color. The leaf blades are sparsely to barely covered in hair, twisting, and up to 30 centimetres (12 inches) long. The inflorescence is a stiff, cylindrical bundle of spikelets 2 to 15 centimetres (3/4 to 6 inches) long with short, blunt bristles. The panicle may appear yellow or yellow-tinged.

The species is often mistaken for S. viridis, but can be told apart by the presence (in the case of S. pumila) of hair on the leaf blades, usually close to the collar; S. viridis lacks the hairs present in S. pumila.

In New Zealand S. pumila can cover 20–40% of otherwise productive dairy farming pasture causing a loss in milk production.

== Gallery ==
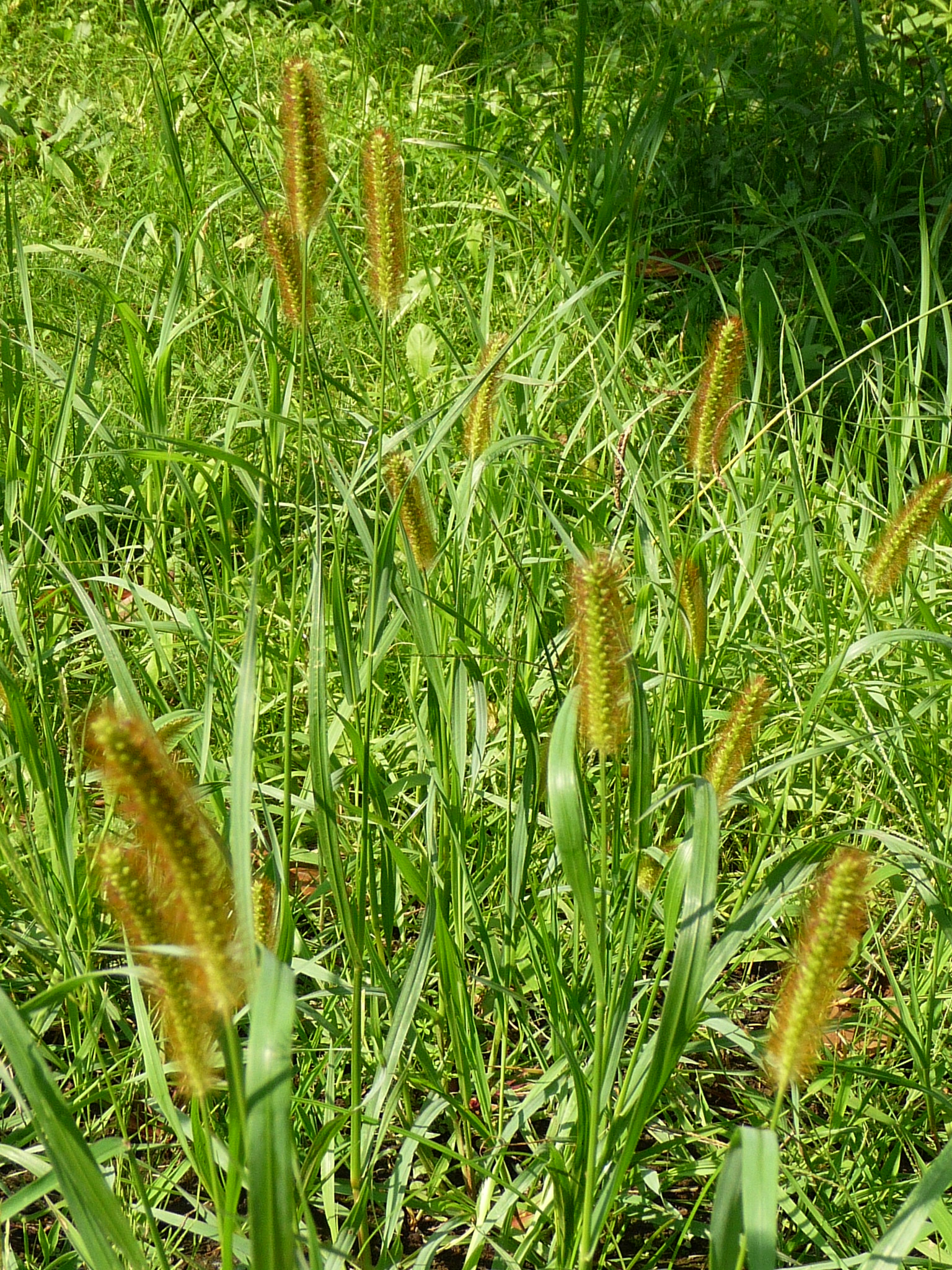
Setaria pumila, Chiba Japan in 2008

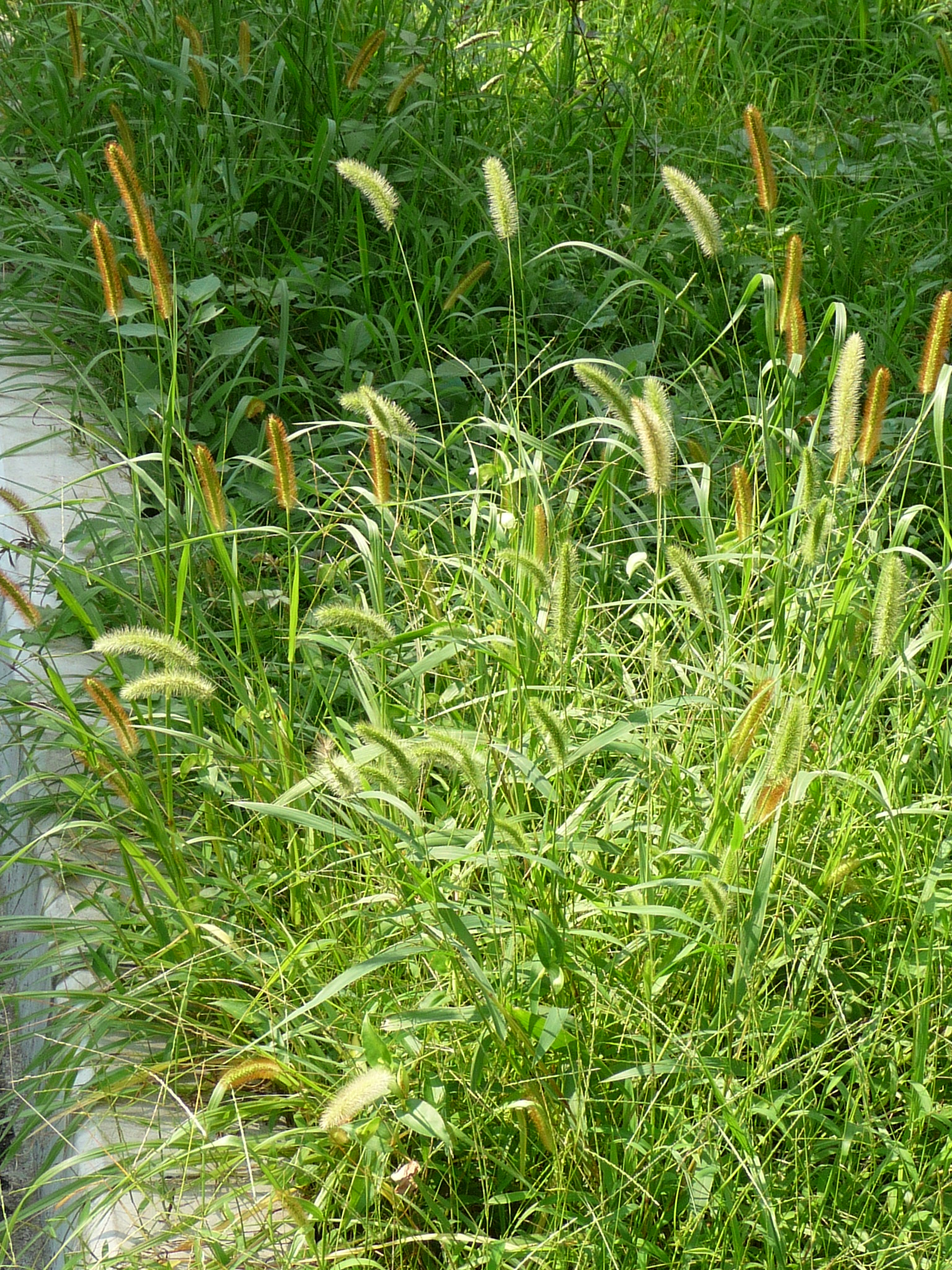
A mixed clump of Setaria pumila and Setaria viridis, Chiba Japan in 2008

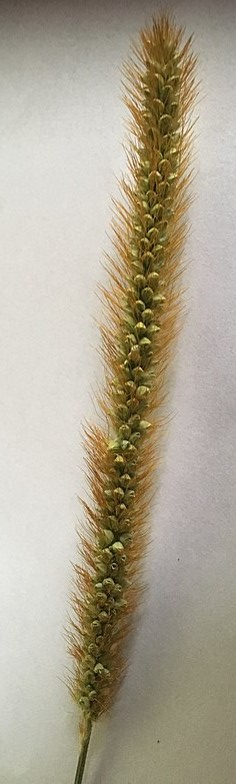
Setaria pumila inflorescence
