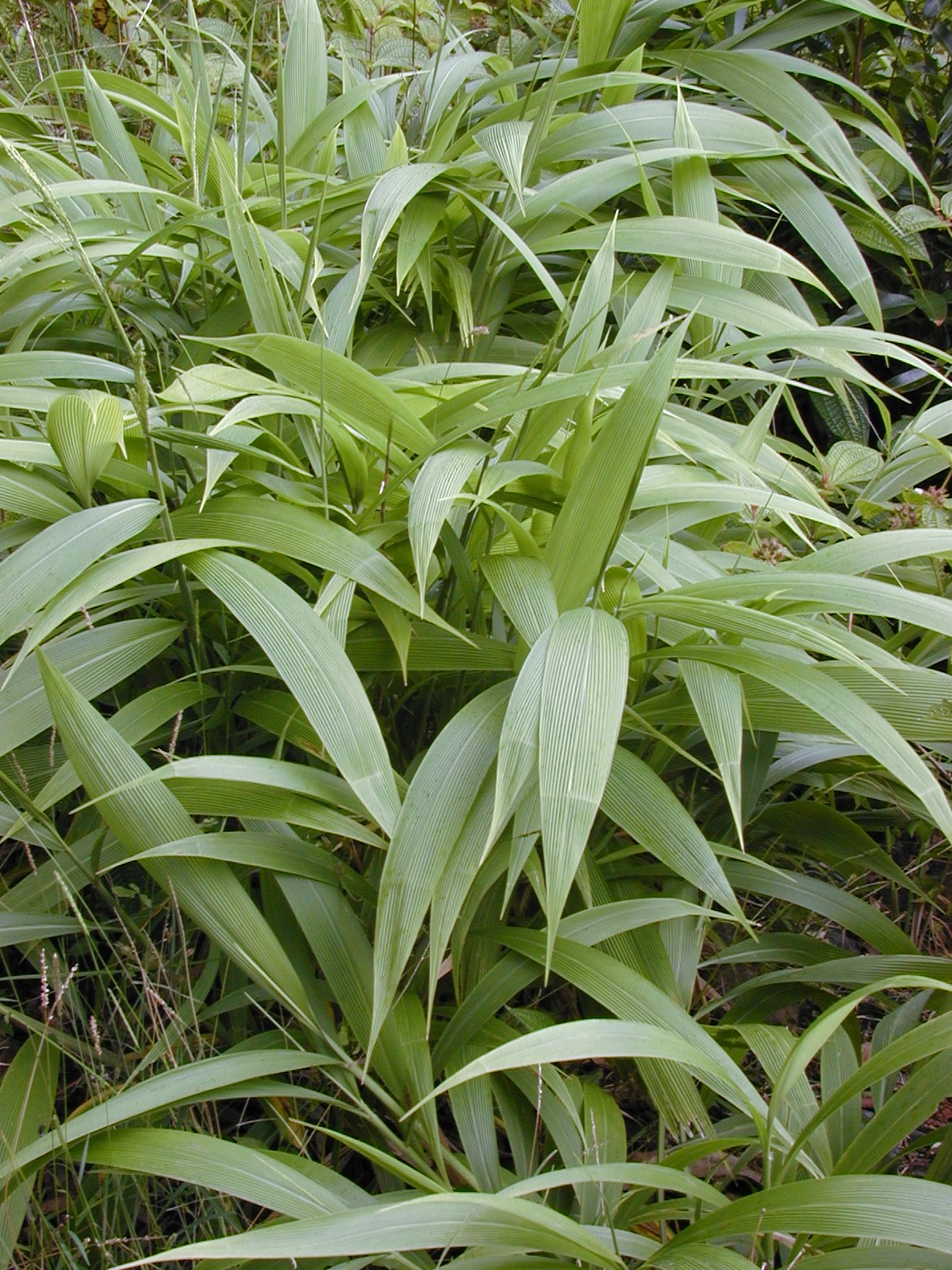

Scientific classification
- Kingdom: Plantae
- Clade: Embryophytes
- Clade: Tracheophytes
- Clade: Angiosperms
- Clade: Monocots
- Clade: Commelinids
- Order: Poales
- Family: Poaceae
- Subfamily: Panicoideae
- Genus: Setaria
- Species: S. palmifolia

Binomial name
- Setaria palmifolia (J.Koenig) Stapf

Synonyms
- Agrostis plicata Lour.; Chaetochloa effusa (E.Fourn.) Hitchc.; Chaetochloa palmifolia (J.Koenig) Hitchc. & Chase; Chaetochloa sulcata (Aubl.) Hitchc.; Chamaeraphis effusa (E.Fourn.) Kuntze; Chamaeraphis nepalensis (Spreng.) Kuntze; Chamaeraphis neurodes (F.W.Schultz) Kuntze; Chamaeraphis palmifolia (K.D.Koenig) Kuntze; Chamaeraphis paniculifera (Steud.) Kuntze; Chamaeraphis sulcata (Aubl.) Kuntze; Panicum amplissimum Steud.; Panicum kleinianum Nees ex Andersson nom. inval.; Panicum lene Steud.; Panicum mexicanum Scribn. & Merr.; Panicum nepalense Spreng.; Panicum nervosum Roxb. nom. illeg.; Panicum neurodes Schult.; Panicum palmatum R.Schleich.; Panicum palmifolia J.Koenig [Spelling variant]; Panicum palmifolium J.Koenig; Panicum paniculiferum Steud.; Panicum plicatum Roxb. nom. illeg.; Panicum plicatum Willd. nom. illeg.; Panicum sulcatum Aubl.; Setaria effusa E.Fourn.; Setaria lenis (Steud.) Miq.; Setaria paniculifera (Steud.) E. Fourn. ex Hemsl.; Setaria paniculifera (Steud.) E.Fourn.; Setaria sulcata (Aubl.) Desv. nom. illeg.

= Setaria palmifolia =

Species of grass

Setaria palmifolia is a species of grass known by the common names palmgrass, highland pitpit, hailans pitpit, short pitpit, broadleaved bristlegrass, and knotroot.

== Description ==
This species is a perennial grass with stems growing up to 2 or 3 metres (6 1/2 or 10 ft) long from a knotty rhizome. The stems can be up to 1 centimetre thick. The leaf sheaths are sparsely to totally hairy. The leaf blades are linear, oval, or lance-shaped and up to 60 to 80 cm (24 to 31 in) long by 7 or 8 cm wide. They have a pleated texture and are hairless or with some rough hairs.

The panicle is loose, open and spreading, reaching up to 80 cm long. The spikelet is a few millimetres long but is often accompanied by a bristle which can be 1.5 cm long.

== Distribution and habitat ==
It is native to temperate and tropical Asia. It is known elsewhere as an introduced, and often invasive, species, including in Australia, New Zealand, many Pacific Islands, and the Americas.

== Ecology ==
The grass has been introduced to many areas, often as an ornamental. It is widespread in the Pacific Islands. It has become an invasive plant on Lord Howe Island, Norfolk Island, Rapa Nui, Fiji, and the Solomon Islands, and in Samoa and Hawaii. It is also invasive in New Zealand and Queensland.

The grass is robust and spreads via rhizome and seed banks, forming monotypic stands. It is a tall plant with wide leaves that shade out other vegetation. The rampant feral pigs of Hawaii facilitate its spread there by uprooting the surrounding plants while feeding on its thick stems. It is also spread by seed-eating birds.

This species is host to the fungi Cercospora setariae and Phacellium paspali.

== Uses ==
The grass is cultivated as an ornamental plant for its palm-like pleated leaves. Some cultivars have striped leaves and 'Rubra' has purple midribs.

It is grown as a vegetable crop in Papua New Guinea, where that is known as highland pitpit. The stem of the grass is eaten after cooking. The grain can be eaten as a rice substitute.

== In culture ==
A folk belief in Taiwan holds that the number of latitudinal creases on the leaf predicts the number of typhoons that will hit the area in the coming or current typhoon season. It is known locally as typhoon grass.
