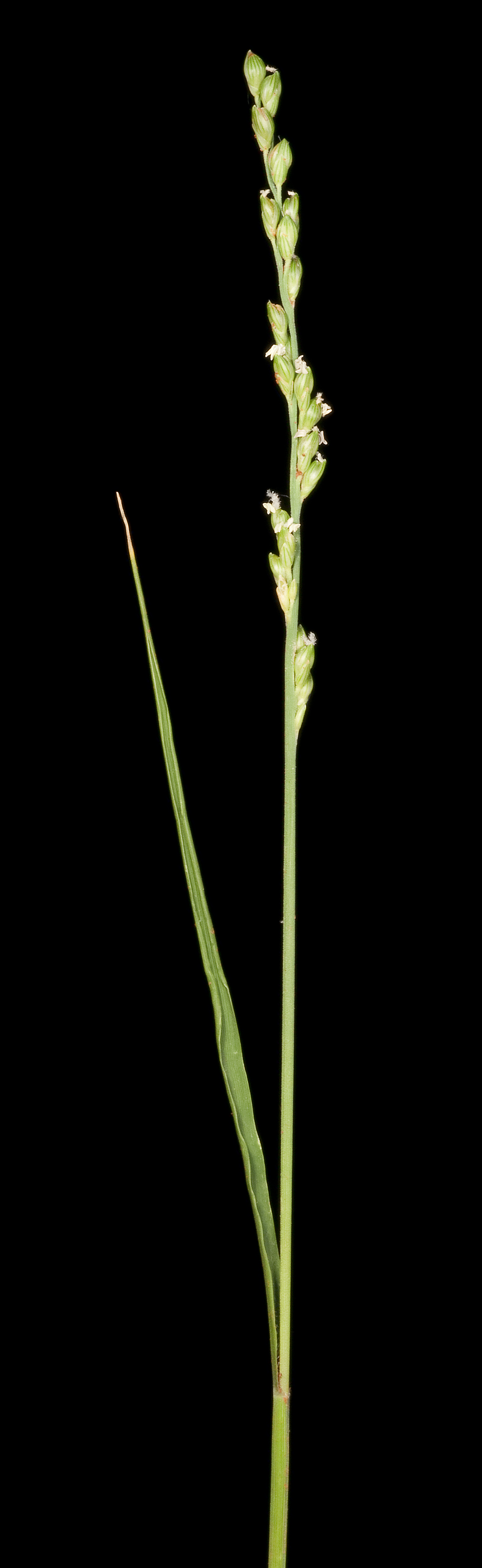

Scientific classification
- Kingdom: Plantae
- Clade: Tracheophytes
- Clade: Angiosperms
- Clade: Monocots
- Clade: Commelinids
- Order: Poales
- Family: Poaceae
- Subfamily: Panicoideae
- Genus: Setaria
- Species: S. basiclada

Binomial name
- Setaria basiclada (Hughes) R.D.Webster

Synonyms
- Paspalidium basicladum Hughes

= Setaria basiclada =

Species of grass

Setaria basiclada, synonym Paspalidium basicladum, is a species of grass in the family Poaceae native to Australia, first described by Dorothy Kate Hughes in 1923. It is an annual and is found in desert and dry shrublands. Australian authorities accept the name as Paspalidium basicladum, but other authorities consider the accepted name to be Setaria basiclada.
