= Setaria brigalow =

Scientific classification
- Kingdom: Plantae
- Clade: Tracheophytes
- Clade: Angiosperms
- Clade: Monocots
- Clade: Commelinids
- Order: Poales
- Family: Poaceae
- Subfamily: Panicoideae
- Genus: Setaria
- Species: S. brigalow

Binomial name
- Setaria brigalow R.D.Webster

Synonyms
- Paspalidium caespitosum C.E.Hubb.

Species of grass

Setaria brigalow, synonym Paspalidium caespitosum, commonly known as Brigalow grass, is a species of grass in the family Poaceae native to inland eastern Australia, where it is found in the Brigalow Belt.
