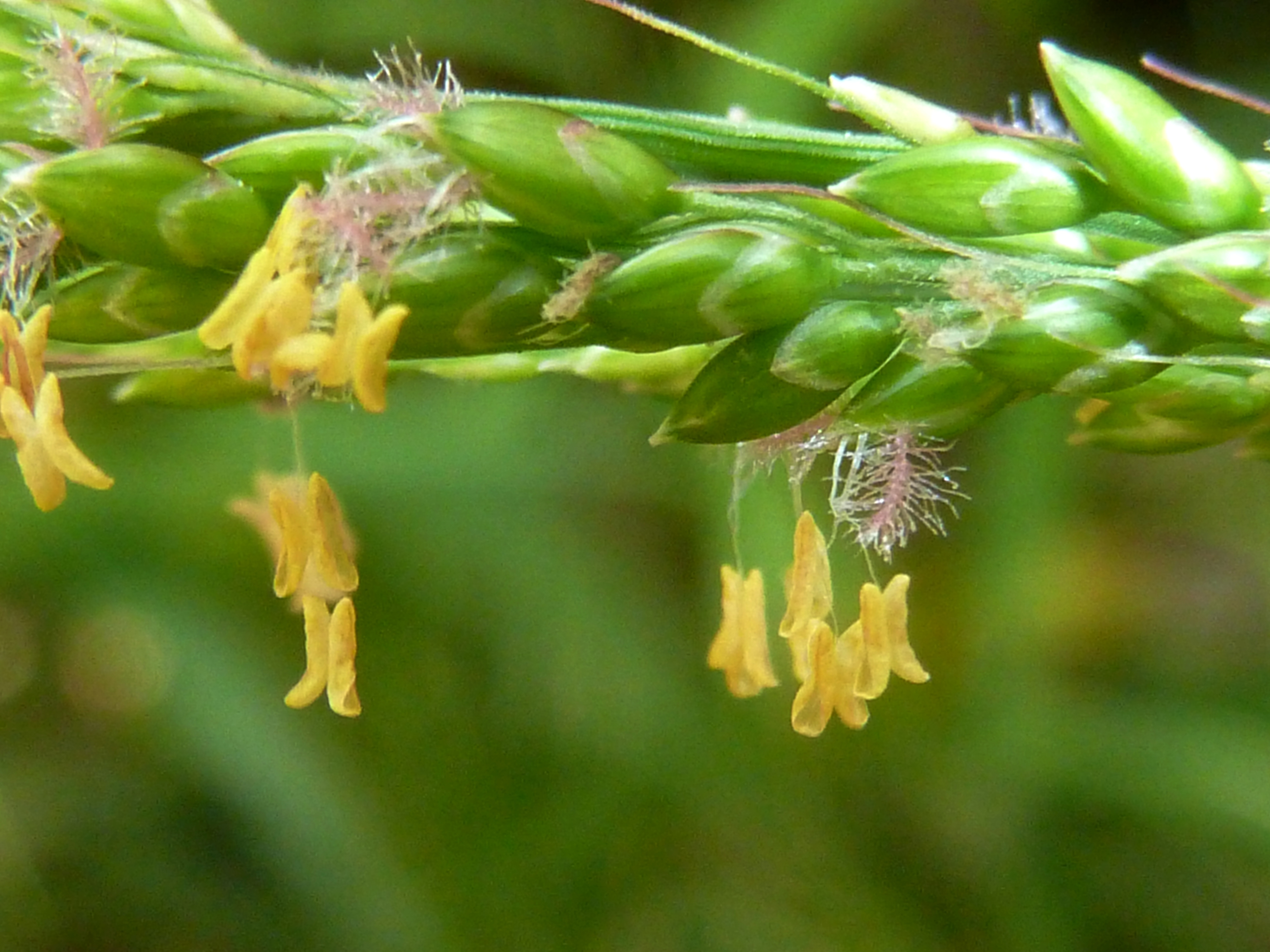

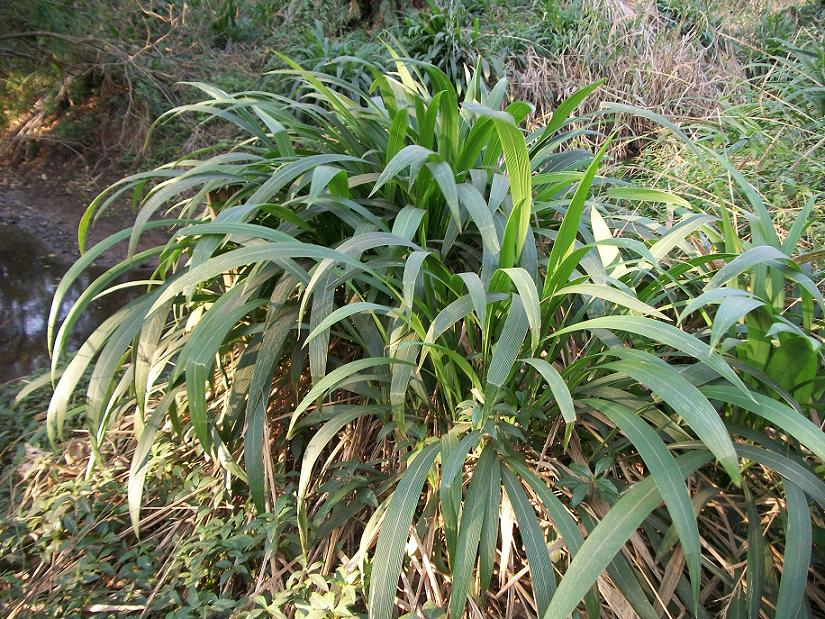

Scientific classification
- Kingdom: Plantae
- Clade: Tracheophytes
- Clade: Angiosperms
- Clade: Monocots
- Clade: Commelinids
- Order: Poales
- Family: Poaceae
- Subfamily: Panicoideae
- Genus: Setaria
- Species: S. megaphylla

Binomial name
- Setaria megaphylla (Steud.) T.Dur. & Schinz

Synonyms
- Agrostis flabellata Salzm. ex Steud. nom. inval.; Panicum flabellatum Steud.; Panicum megaphyllum Steud.; Panicum oligochaete (K.Schum.) Kneuck.; Panicum phyllomacrum Steud.; Panicum plicatile Hochst.; Panicum prolisetum Steud.; Setaria acuta Stapf & C.E.Hubb.; Setaria chevalieri Stapf; Setaria insignis de Wit; Setaria macrophylla Andersson; Setaria natalensis de Wit; Setaria oligochaete K.Schum.; Setaria phyllomacra (Steud.) T.Durand & Schinz; Setaria plicatilis (Hochst.) Hack. ex Engl.; Setaria proliseta (Steud.) T.Durand & Schinz

= Setaria megaphylla =

Species of grass

Setaria megaphylla, the broad-leaved bristle grass, big-leaf bristle grass, ribbon bristle grass, or bigleaf bristlegrass, is native to south-eastern Africa. It is also cultivated, and it has naturalized outside its native range, for example, in Florida in the United States.

It may be found in glades in forested areas and along rivers or streams. It can grow to more than 2 metres tall and has broad dark green leaves and hairy leaf sheaths. Many kinds of birds, such as finches and canaries, eat the seeds.
