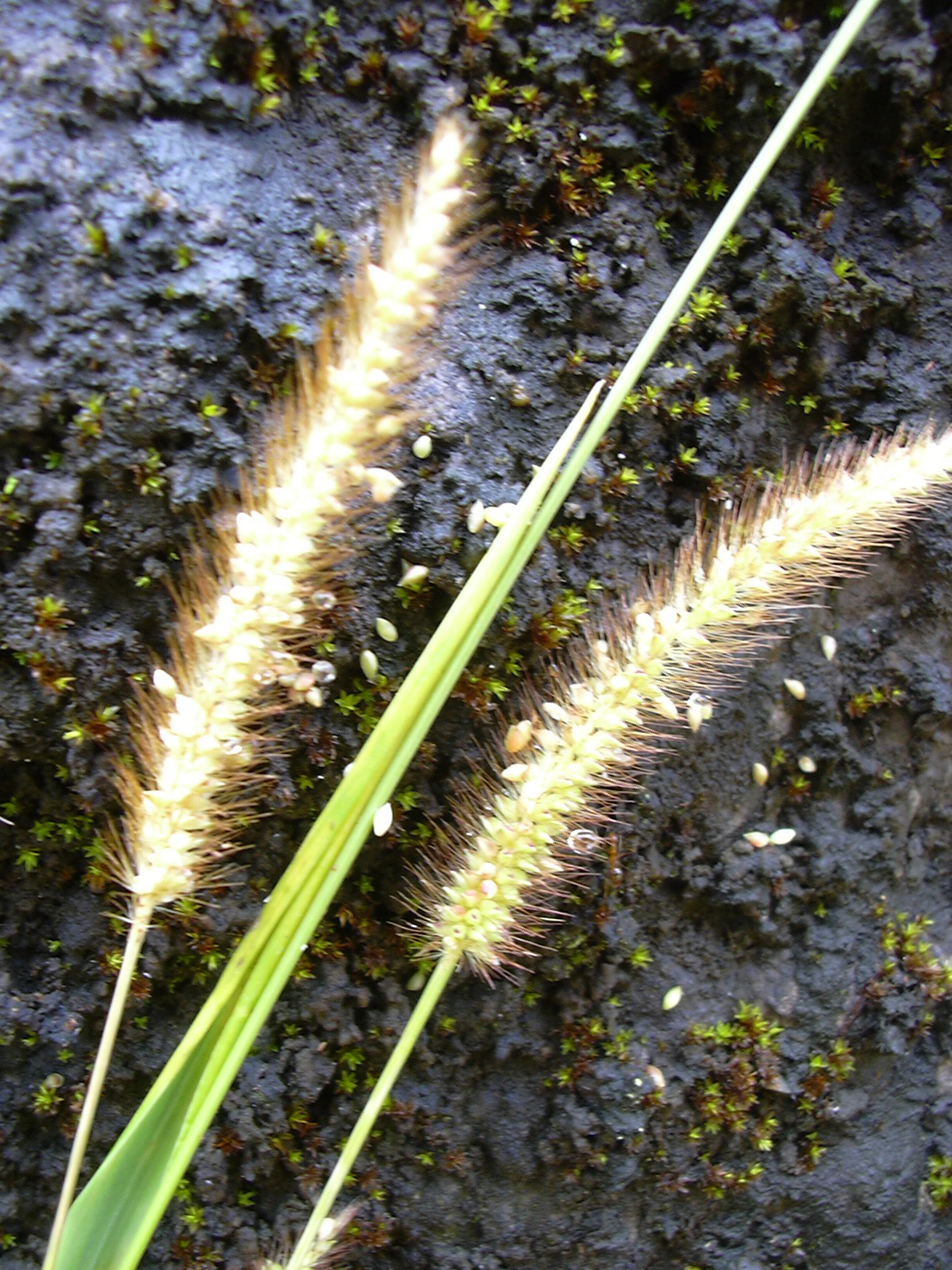
- Setaria parviflora in Hawai'i

Scientific classification
- Kingdom: Plantae
- Clade: Embryophytes
- Clade: Tracheophytes
- Clade: Angiosperms
- Clade: Monocots
- Clade: Commelinids
- Order: Poales
- Family: Poaceae
- Subfamily: Panicoideae
- Supertribe: Panicodae
- Tribe: Paniceae
- Subtribe: Cenchrinae
- Genus: Setaria; P.Beauv. 1812, conserved name not Ach. ex Michx. 1803 (a lichen)

Type species
- Setaria viridis (L.) P.Beauv.

Synonyms
- Acrochaete Peter; Chaetochloa Scribn.; Cymbosetaria Schweick.; Camusiella Bosser; Tansaniochloa Rauschert

= Setaria =

Genus of grasses

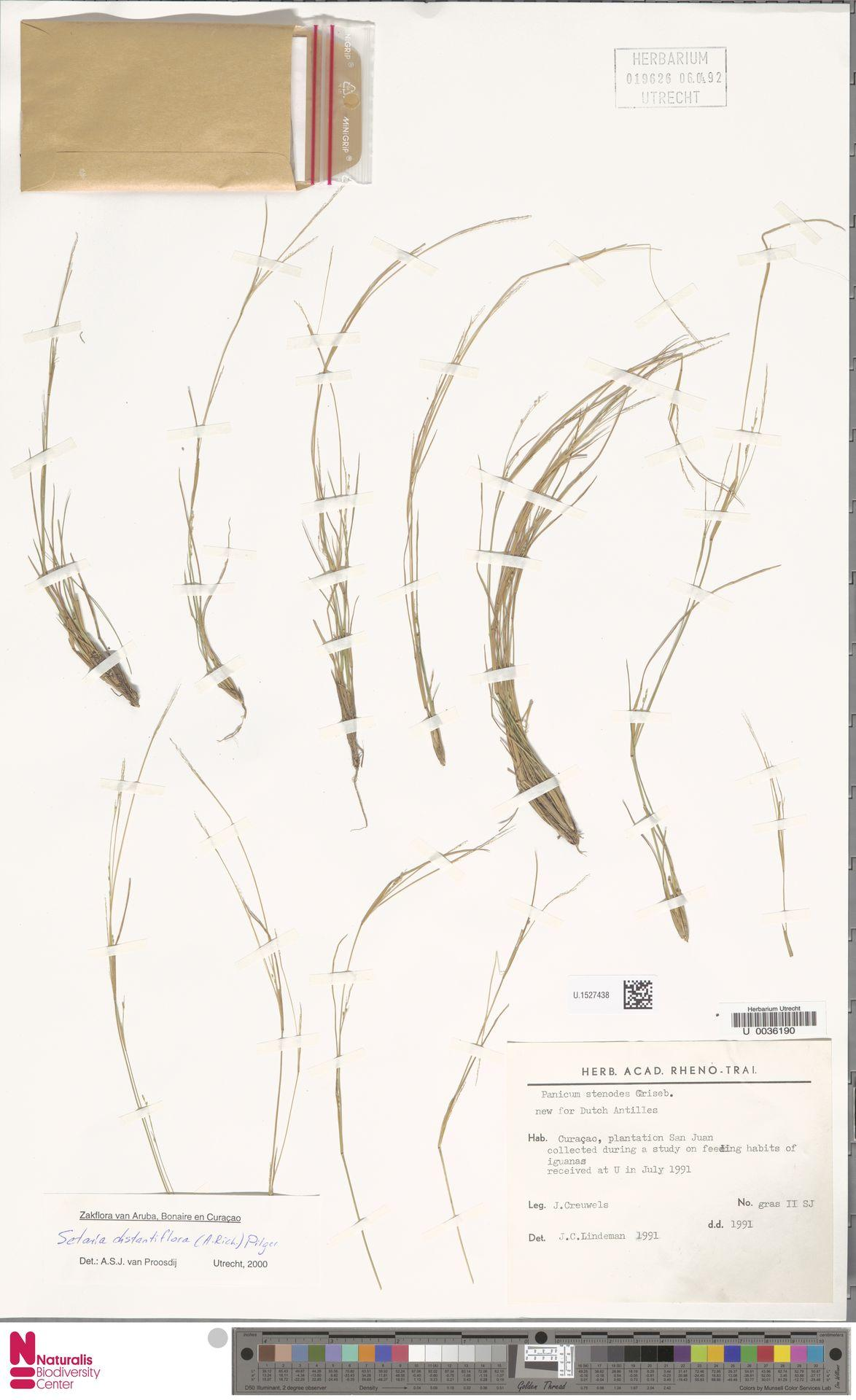
caption=Setaria distantiflora (A.Rich.) Pilg., herbarium sheet

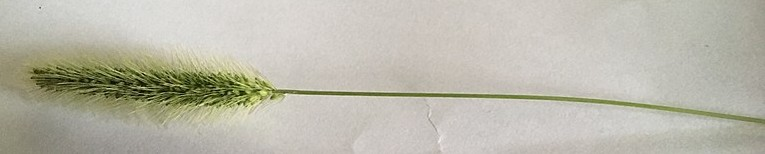

Setaria is a widespread genus of plants in the grass family. The name is derived from the Latin word seta, meaning "bristle" or "hair", which refers to the bristly spikelets.

The genus includes over 100 species distributed in many tropical and temperate regions around the world, and members are commonly known as foxtail or bristle grasses.

== Description ==
The grass is topped by a cylindrical long-haired head, which tend to droop when ripe. The seeds are less than 6 millimetres (1/4 inch) in length.

== Species ==
As of May 2024, Plants of the World Online accepted the following species:

- Setaria adhaerens (Forssk.) Chiov.
- Setaria albovillosa (S.T.Blake) R.D.Webster
- Setaria alonsoi Pensiero & A.M.Anton
- Setaria ankarensis (A.Camus) ined.
- Setaria apiculata (Scribn. & Merr.) K.Schum.
- Setaria appendiculata (Hack.) Stapf
- Setaria arizonica Rominger
- Setaria atrata Hack.
- Setaria australiensis (Scribn. & Merr.) Vickery – scrub pigeon grass
- Setaria austrocaledonica (Balansa) A.Camus
- Setaria aversa (Vickery) R.D.Webster
- Setaria barbata (Lam.) Kunth – bristly foxtail grass, corn grass, Mary grass
- Setaria barbinodis R.A.W.Herrm.
- Setaria basiclada (Hughes) R.D.Webster
- Setaria bathiei A.Camus
- Setaria bosseri A.Camus
- Setaria brigalow R.D.Webster
- Setaria brownii Desv.
- Setaria carinata S.Nozawa & Pensiero
- Setaria cernua Kunth
- Setaria chapmanii (Vasey) Pilg.
- Setaria chondrachne (Steud.) Honda
- Setaria clementii (Domin) R.D.Webster
- Setaria clivalis (Ridl.) Veldkamp
- Setaria constricta (Domin) R.D.Webster
- Setaria cordobensis R.A.W.Herrm.
- Setaria corrugata (Elliott) Schult.
- Setaria criniformis (S.T.Blake) R.D.Webster
- Setaria desertorum (A.Rich.) Morrone
- Setaria dielsii R.A.W.Herrm.
- Setaria distans (Trin.) Veldkamp
- Setaria distantiflora (A.Rich.) Pilg.
- Setaria elegantula (Mez) Morat
- Setaria faberi R.A.W.Herrm. – giant foxtail, Chinese foxtail
- Setaria fiebrigii R.A.W.Herrm.
- Setaria finita Launert
- Setaria flavida (Retz.) Veldkamp
- Setaria forbesiana (Nees ex Steud.) Hook.f.
- Setaria gausa (S.T.Blake) R.D.Webster
- Setaria geminata (Forssk.) Veldkamp
- Setaria globoidea (Domin) R.D.Webster
- Setaria globulifera (Steud.) Griseb.
- Setaria gracillima Hook.f.
- Setaria grandis Stapf
- Setaria grandispiculata (B.K.Simon) R.D.Webster
- Setaria grisebachii E.Fourn.
- Setaria guizhouensis S.L.Chen & G.Y.Sheng
- Setaria hassleri Hack.
- Setaria homonyma (Steud.) Chiov.
- Setaria humbertiana A.Camus
- Setaria hunzikeri Anton
- Setaria incrassata (Hochst.) Hack. – Vlei bristlegrass
- Setaria intermedia Roem. & Schult.
- Setaria italica (L.) P.Beauv. – foxtail millet, dwarf setaria, Italian millet
- Setaria jaffrei Morat
- Setaria johnsonii (B.K.Simon) ined.
- Setaria jubiflora (Trin.) R.D.Webster
- Setaria kagerensis Mez
- Setaria lachnea (Nees) Kunth
- Setaria latifolia (Scribn.) R.A.W.Herrm.
- Setaria leonis (E.Ekman) León
- Setaria leucopila (Scribn. & Merr.) K.Schum. – plains bristle grass, streambed bristle grass
- Setaria liebmannii E.Fourn.
- Setaria limensis Tovar
- Setaria lindenbergiana (Nees) Stapf
- Setaria longipila E.Fourn.
- Setaria longiseta P.Beauv.
- Setaria macrosperma (Scribn. & Merr.) K.Schum.
- Setaria macrostachya Kunth
- Setaria madecassa A.Camus
- Setaria magna Griseb. – giant bristle grass
- Setaria megaphylla (Steud.) T.Durand & Schinz – broad-leaved bristle grass, ribbon bristle grass
- Setaria mendocina Phil.
- Setaria mildbraedii Mez ex C.E.Hubb.
- Setaria montana Reeder
- Setaria nicorae Pensiero
- Setaria nigrirostris (Nees) T.Durand & Schinz – black-seed bristle grass
- Setaria oblongata (Griseb.) Parodi
- Setaria obscura de Wit
- Setaria obtusifolia (Delile) Morrone
- Setaria oplismenoides R.A.W.Herrm.
- Setaria orthosticha K.Schum. ex R.A.W.Herrm.
- Setaria palmeri Henrard
- Setaria palmifolia (J.Koenig) Stapf – palm grass, highland pitpit
- Setaria pampeana Parodi ex Nicora
- Setaria paraguayensis Pensiero
- Setaria parodii Nicora
- Setaria parviflora (Poir.) Kerguélen – knotroot bristle grass, slender pigeon grass
- Setaria paspalidioides Vickery
- Setaria paucifolia (Morong) Lindm.
- Setaria perrieri A.Camus
- Setaria petiolata Stapf & C.E.Hubb.
- Setaria pflanzii Pensiero
- Setaria plicata (Lam.) T.Cooke
- Setaria poiretiana (Schult.) Kunth – grama negra, gramalote sacha
- Setaria pradana (León ex C.L.Hitchc.) León
- Setaria pseudaristata (Peter) Pilg.
- Setaria pumila (Poir.) Roem. & Schult. – yellow foxtail
- Setaria punctata (Burm.f.) Veldkamp
- Setaria queenslandica Domin
- Setaria rara (R.Br.) R.D.Webster
- Setaria reflexa (R.D.Webster) R.D.Webster
- Setaria restioidea (Franch.) Stapf
- Setaria retiglumis (Domin) R.D.Webster
- Setaria reverchonii (Vasey) Pilg.
- Setaria rigida Stapf
- Setaria roemeri Jansen
- Setaria rosengurttii Nicora
- Setaria sagittifolia (A.Rich.) Walp.
- Setaria scabrifolia (Nees) Kunth
- Setaria scandens Schrad.
- Setaria scheelei (Steud.) Hitchc. – southwestern bristle grass
- Setaria scottii (Hack.) A.Camus
- Setaria setosa (Sw.) P.Beauv.
- Setaria spartella (S.T.Blake) R.D.Webster
- Setaria sphacelata (Schumach.) Stapf & C.E.Hubb. – African bristle grass, South African pigeon grass
- Setaria stolonifera Boldrini
- Setaria submacrostachya Luces
- Setaria sulcata Raddi
- Setaria surgens Stapf
- Setaria tabulata (Hack.) R.D.Webster
- Setaria taolanensis A.Camus
- Setaria tenacissima Schrad.
- Setaria tenax (Rich.) Desv.
- Setaria texana Emery
- Setaria uda (S.T.Blake) R.D.Webster
- Setaria utowanaea (Scribn.) Pilg.
- Setaria vaginata Spreng.
- Setaria variifolia (Swallen) Davidse
- Setaria vatkeana K.Schum.
- Setaria verticillata (L.) P.Beauv. – bristly foxtail
- Setaria villosissima (Scribn. & Merr.) K.Schum.
- Setaria viridis (L.) P.Beauv. – green foxtail
- Setaria vulpiseta (Lam.) Roem. & Schult. – plains bristle grass
- Setaria welwitschii Rendle
- Setaria yunnanensis Keng f. & K.D.Yu

Formerly included

Numerous species were once considered members of Setaria but have since been reassigned to the genera Brachiaria, Dissochondrus, Echinochloa, Holcolemma, Ixophorus, Oplismenus, Panicum, Pennisetum, Pseudoraphis, Setariopsis, and Urochloa.

== Uses ==
The grains can be eaten raw, though are hard and can be bitter; boiling can reduce both of these properties.

Several species have been domesticated and used as staple crops throughout history: foxtail millet (S. italica), korali (S. pumila) in India, and, before the full domestication of maize, Setaria macrostachya in Mexico. Several species are still cultivated today as food or as animal fodder, such as foxtail millet and korali (S. pumila), while others are considered invasive weeds. S. italica and S. viridis are being developed as genetic model systems for the study of monocots and bioenergy grasses.

Other species that have been cultivated as crops include S. palmifolia (highland pitpit) of Papua New Guinea, where it is cultivated as a green vegetable; S. parviflora (knot-root foxtail), historically cultivated in Mesoamerica; and S. sphacelata (African bristle grass) of Sudan, a "lost millet" of Nubia.

== See also ==
- Hendrik de Wit, a botanist who studied Setaria
