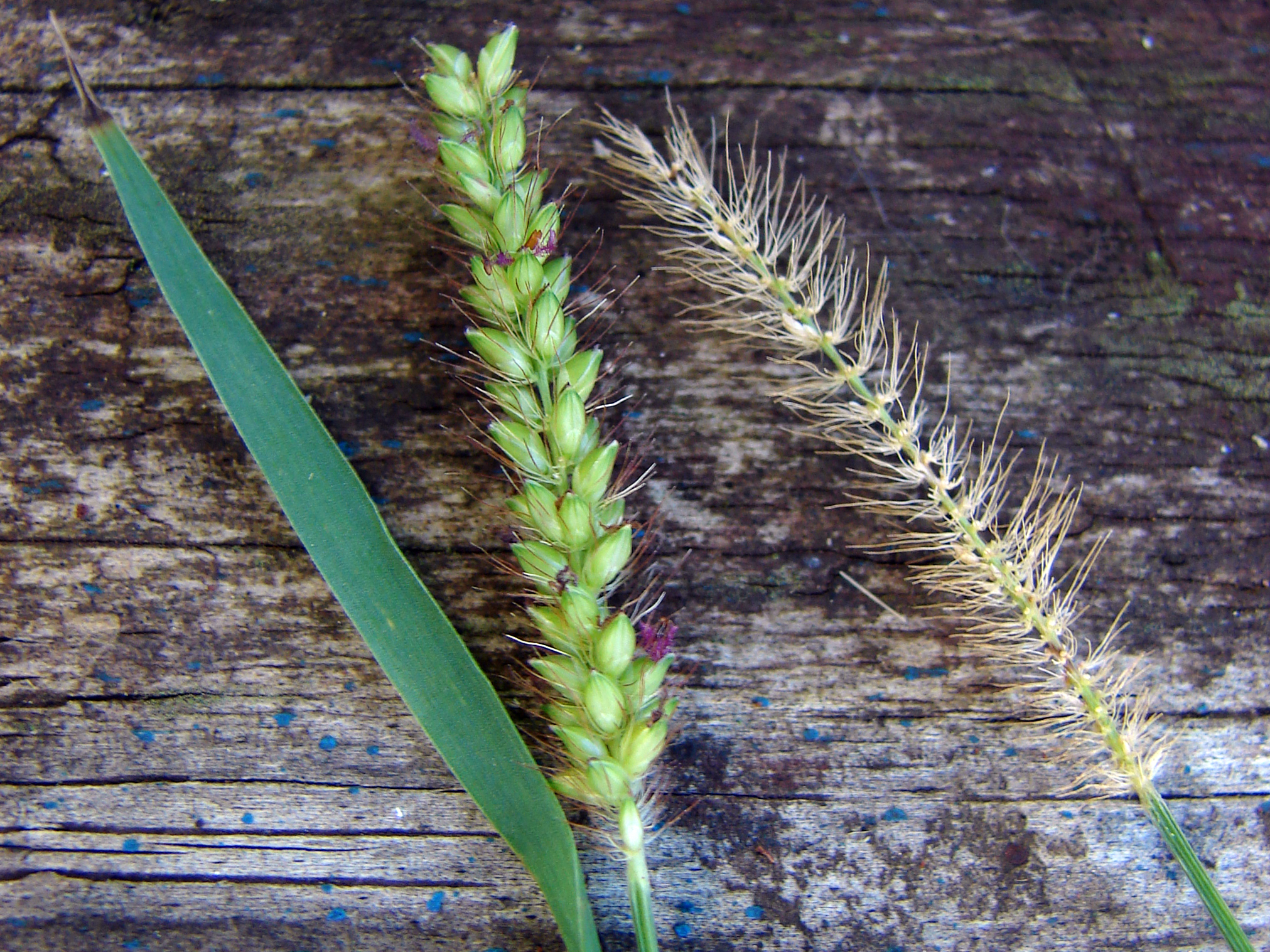

Conservation status
- Secure (NatureServe)

Scientific classification
- Kingdom: Plantae
- Clade: Tracheophytes
- Clade: Angiosperms
- Clade: Monocots
- Clade: Commelinids
- Order: Poales
- Family: Poaceae
- Subfamily: Panicoideae
- Genus: Setaria
- Species: S. parviflora

Binomial name
- Setaria parviflora (Poir.) Kerguélen

Synonyms
- Alopecurus rubicundus Buch.-Ham. ex Wall. nom. inval.; Cenchrus parviflorus Poir.; Chaetochloa flava (Nees) Scribn.; Chaetochloa geniculata (Poir.) Millsp. & Chase; Chaetochloa gracilis (Kunth) Scribn. & Merr.; Chaetochloa imberbis (Poir.) Scribn.; Chaetochloa laevigata (Nutt.) Scribn. nom. inval.; Chaetochloa occidentalis Nash; Chaetochloa parviflora (Poir.) Scribn.; Chaetochloa penicillata (J.Presl) Scribn.; Chaetochloa perennis (Hall) C.Bicknell; Chaetochloa purpurascens (Kunth) Scribn. & Merr.; Chaetochloa ventenatii (Kunth) Nash nom. illeg.; Chaetochloa versicolor C.Bicknell; Chamaeraphis gracilis (Kunth) Kuntze ex Stuck. nom. illeg.; Chamaeraphis imberbis (Poir.) Kuntze ex Stuck.; Chamaeraphis penicillata (J.Presl) Stuck.; Chamaeraphis ventenatii (Kunth) Beal nom. illeg.; Echinochloa geniculata (Poir.) Millsp.; Panicum adscendens Hoffm. ex Schult. & Schult.f. nom. inval.; Panicum alopecuroideum Schreb. ex Steud.; Panicum ascendens Willd. ex Spreng. nom. inval.; Panicum beccabunga Rendle; Panicum berteronianum (Schult.) Steud.; Panicum brachytrichum Steud. nom. inval.; Panicum brasiliense Spreng.; Panicum congestum Döll nom. inval.; Panicum dasyurum Nees; Panicum flavum Nees; Panicum fuscescens Willd. ex Steud. nom. inval.; Panicum geniculatum Poir.; Panicum geniculatum Willd. nom. illeg.; Panicum glaberrimum Elliott ex Scribn. & Merr. nom. inval.; Panicum glaucescens Salzm. ex Döll nom. inval.; Panicum glaucum Steud. ex Döll nom. inval.; Panicum gobariense Vanderyst nom. inval.; Panicum imberbe Poir.; Panicum laevigatum Elliott nom. illeg.; Panicum medium Muhl. ex Elliott nom. inval.; Panicum occidentale (Nash) Nieuwl. nom. illeg.; Panicum pseudoholcus Steud. nom. inval.; Panicum raripilum Kunth; Panicum tejucense Nees; Panicum ventenatii (Kunth) Steud. nom. illeg.; Panicum versicolor (C.Bicknell) Nieuwl. nom. illeg.; Panicum virescens Salzm. ex Döll nom. inval.; Panicum vulpinum Willd.; Pennisetum geniculatum (Poir.) J.Jacq.; Pennisetum laevigatum Nutt.; Pennisetum parviflorum (Poir.) Trin.; Setaria affinis Schult.; Setaria ambigua Schrad.; Setaria barretoi Boldrini; Setaria berteroniana Schult.; Setaria brachytricha Mez ex R.A.W.Herrm.; Setaria discolor Hack.; Setaria flava (Nees) Kunth; Setaria floriana Andersson; Setaria geniculata P.Beauv.; Setaria gracilis Kunth; Setaria imberbis (Poir.) Roem. & Schult.; Setaria laevigata (Nutt.) Schult.; Setaria penicillata J.Presl; Setaria perennis Hall; Setaria purpurascens Kunth; Setaria stipaeculmis Müll. Hal.; Setaria stipiculmis C.Muell.; Setaria streptobotrys E.Fourn.; Setaria tejucensis (Nees) Kunth; Setaria tenella Desv.; Setaria ventenatii Kunth nom. illeg.; Setaria vulpina (Willd.) P.Beauv.

= Setaria parviflora =

Species of plant

Setaria parviflora is a species of grass known by the common names marsh bristlegrass, knotroot bristle-grass, bristly foxtail and yellow bristlegrass. It is native to North America, including Mexico and the United States from California to the East Coast, Central America and the West Indies, and South America.

This grass is a perennial with small, knotty rhizomes. It produces stems 30 centimeters to well over one meter tall. The leaf blades are up to 25 centimeters long and under a centimeter wide. The leaves are whitish-green. The inflorescence is a compact, spikelike panicle up to 8 or 10 centimeters long. Surrounding each spikelet are up to 12 yellow or purple bristles. The bristles stay on the stalk after the seeds drop away.

This grass grows in moist habitat. It can grow in salty habitat such as salt marshes.
