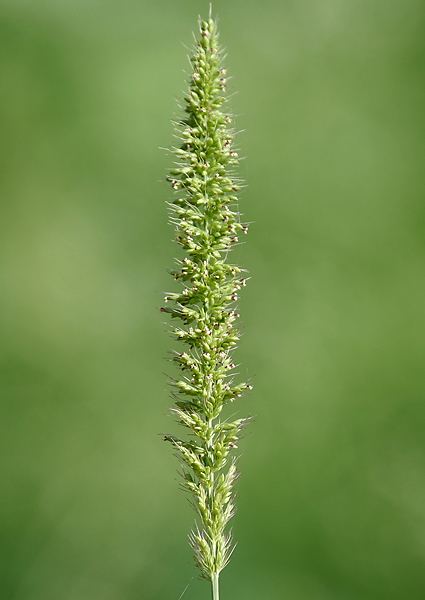

Scientific classification
- Kingdom: Plantae
- Clade: Tracheophytes
- Clade: Angiosperms
- Clade: Monocots
- Clade: Commelinids
- Order: Poales
- Family: Poaceae
- Subfamily: Panicoideae
- Genus: Setaria
- Species: S. verticillata

Binomial name
- Setaria verticillata (L.) P.Beauv.

Synonyms
- List: Chaetochloa ambigua (Guss.) Scribn. & Merr.; Chaetochloa verticillata (L.) Scribn.; Chaetochloa verticillata var. breviseta (Mutel) Farw.; Chamaeraphis italica var. ambigua (Guss.) Kuntze; Chamaeraphis verticillata (L.) Porter; Ixophorus verticillatus (L.) Nash; Panicum ambiguum (Guss.) Hausskn. nom. illeg.; Panicum asperum Lam.; Panicum decipiens (F.W.Schultz) E.H.L.Krause nom. illeg.; Panicum floribundum Willd. ex Spreng. nom. inval.; Panicum italicum Ucria nom. illeg.; Panicum rude Lam. ex Steud. nom. inval.; Panicum verticillatum L.; Panicum verticillatum var. ambiguum Guss.; Panicum viride Desf. nom. illeg.; Pennisetum verticillatum (L.) R.Br.; Setaria adhaerens var. ambigua (Guss.) Belo-Corr.; Setaria adhaerens var. antrorsa (A.Braun) H.Scholz; Setaria adhaerens subsp. verticillata (L.) Belo-Corr.; Setaria ambigua (Guss.) Guss. nom. illeg.; Setaria aspera Link ex G.Don; Setaria carnei Hitchc.; Setaria conglomerata Fr. ex Schltdl.; Setaria decipiens F.W.Schultz; Setaria decipiens Schimp. ex Morariu nom. illeg.; Setaria decipiens f. latifolia (Freyn) Soó; Setaria decipiens f. major (Bujor.) Soó; Setaria decipiens subf. ramiflora (Bujor.) Soó; Setaria decipiens var. schulteissii (Zimm.) Morariu; Setaria decipiens f. schultheissii (Zimm.) Soó; Setaria floribunda Spreng.; Setaria gussonei Kerguélen; Setaria leiantha f. subhirsuta Hack.; Setaria nubica Link; Setaria panicea (L.) Schinz & Thell.; Setaria pratensis Phil.; Setaria pseudoverticillata Schltdl. nom. inval.; Setaria teysmannii Miq.; Setaria verticilliformis Dumort.; Setaria verticillata subsp. ambigua (Guss.) Arcang.; Setaria verticillata var. ambigua (Guss.) Parl.; Setaria verticillata f. ambigua (Guss.) B.Boivin; Setaria verticillata f. arenosa (Schur) Morariu; Setariopsis verticillata (L.) Samp.; Setaria viridis subsp. ambigua (Guss.) K.Richt.

= Setaria verticillata =

Species of grass

Setaria verticillata is a species of grass known by the common names hooked bristlegrass, rough bristle-grass and bristly foxtail. It is native to Europe, but it is known on most continents as an introduced species and often a noxious weed. It is a hardy bunchgrass which grows in many types of urban, cultivated, and disturbed habitat. It is a weed of many types of agricultural crops, growing in vineyards and fields. Herbicide-resistant strains have been noted.

This is an annual grass with decumbent or erect stems growing up to a meter long. The leaf blades are up to 25 centimeters long and have a long sheath around the stem. The inflorescence is a dense panicle up to 15 centimeters long which tapers at both ends. It contains many small spikelets and bristles. The bristles have tiny backwards-pointing barbs that help them hook onto clothing or animal fur, facilitating their dispersal.

Seeds of the grass are used to make beer in South Africa and porridge in Namibia. They have been used as a famine food in India.
