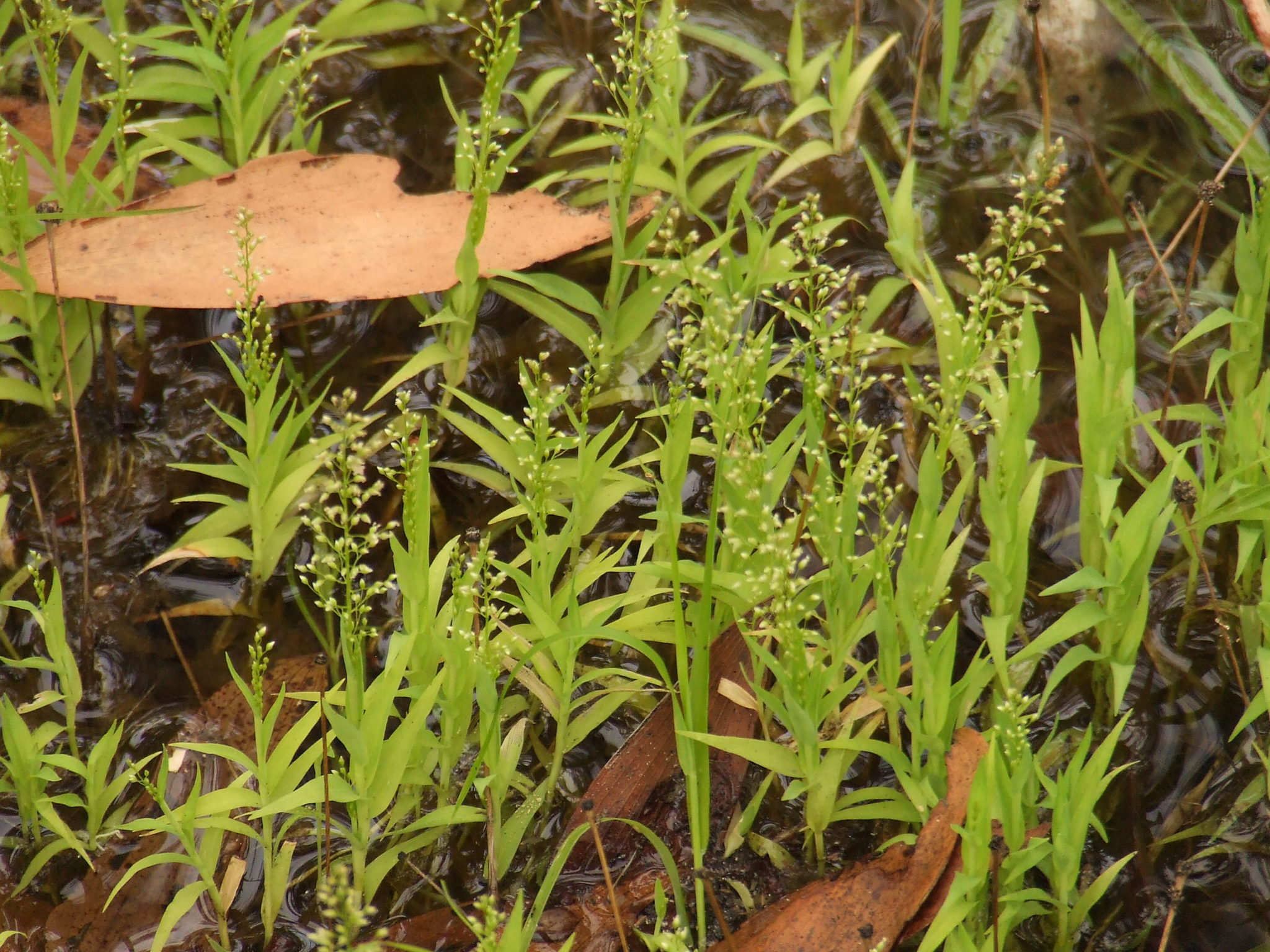
- Coelachne pulchella

Scientific classification
- Kingdom: Plantae
- Clade: Tracheophytes
- Clade: Angiosperms
- Clade: Monocots
- Clade: Commelinids
- Order: Poales
- Family: Poaceae
- Subfamily: Micrairoideae
- Tribe: Isachneae
- Genus: Coelachne; R.Br.

Type species
- Coelachne pulchella R.Br.

= Coelachne =

Genus of grasses

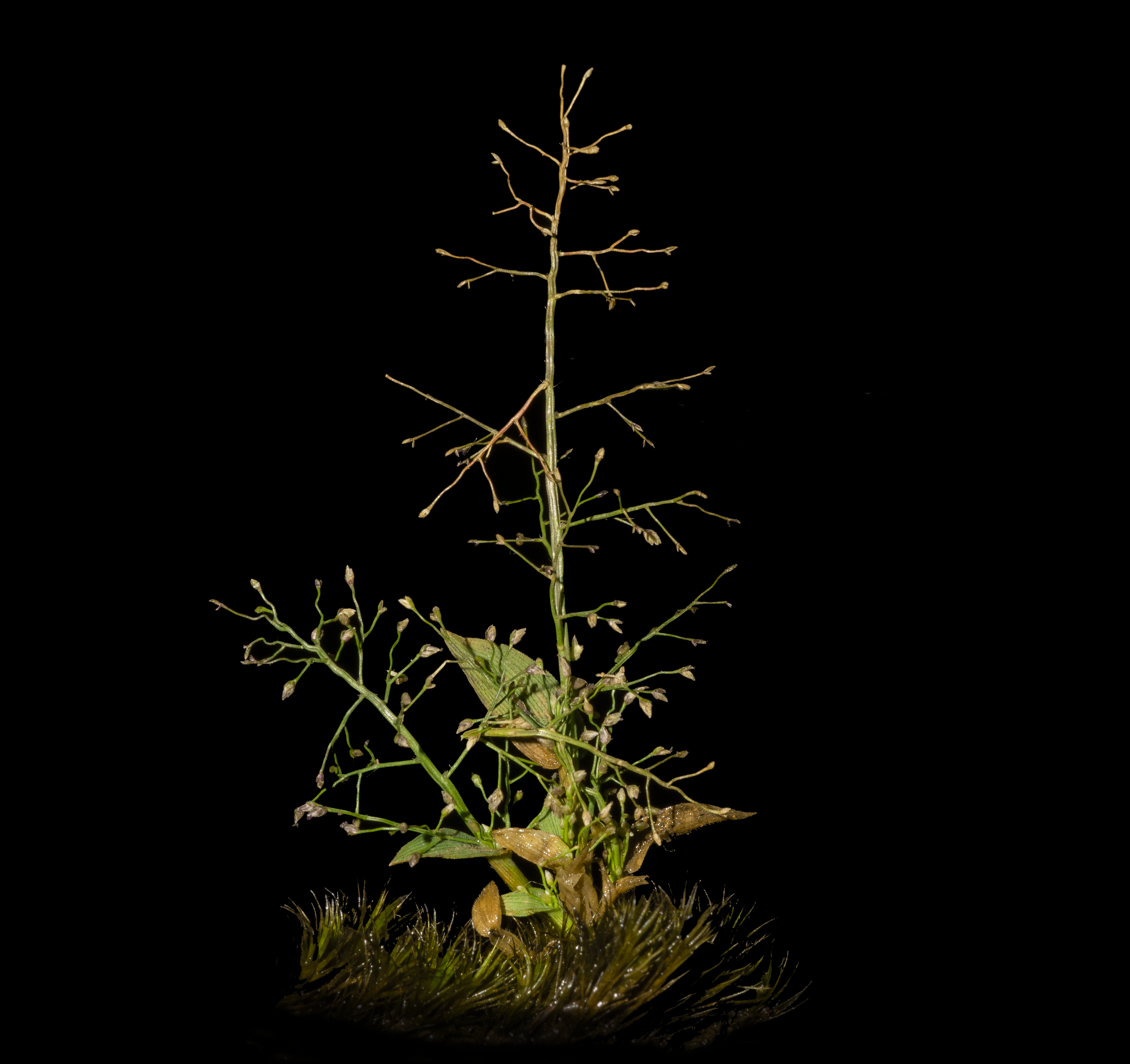
Coelachne minuta Bor

Coelachne is a genus of Asian, African, and Australian plants in the grass family.

Species

- Coelachne africana Pilg. - tropical Africa incl Madagascar
- Coelachne auquieri Ndab. - Rwanda
- Coelachne friesiorum C.E.Hubb. - Aberdare Range in Kenya
- Coelachne ghatica Naik - Western Ghats in India
- Coelachne infirma Buse - Madagascar, New Guinea, Maluku, Sulawesi, Philippines, Java
- Coelachne japonica Hack. - Honshu, Kyushu
- Coelachne minuta Bor - Thailand, India
- Coelachne perpusilla (Nees ex Steud.) Thwaites - Tamil Nadu, Sri Lanka, Laos, Thailand, Vietnam, Philippines
- Coelachne pulchella R.Br. - Myanmar, Vietnam, Queensland, Northern Territory
- Coelachne simpliciuscula (Steud.) Munro ex Benth. - Madagascar, Indian subcontinent, China, Indochina, Philippines, Malaysia
- Coelachne soerensenii Bor - Thailand

formerly included

see Isachne Limnopoa Micraira

- Coelachne angolensis - Isachne angolensis
- Coelachne meeboldii - Limnopoa meeboldii
- Coelachne occidentalis - Isachne angolensis
- Coelachne subulifolia - Micraira subulifolia
