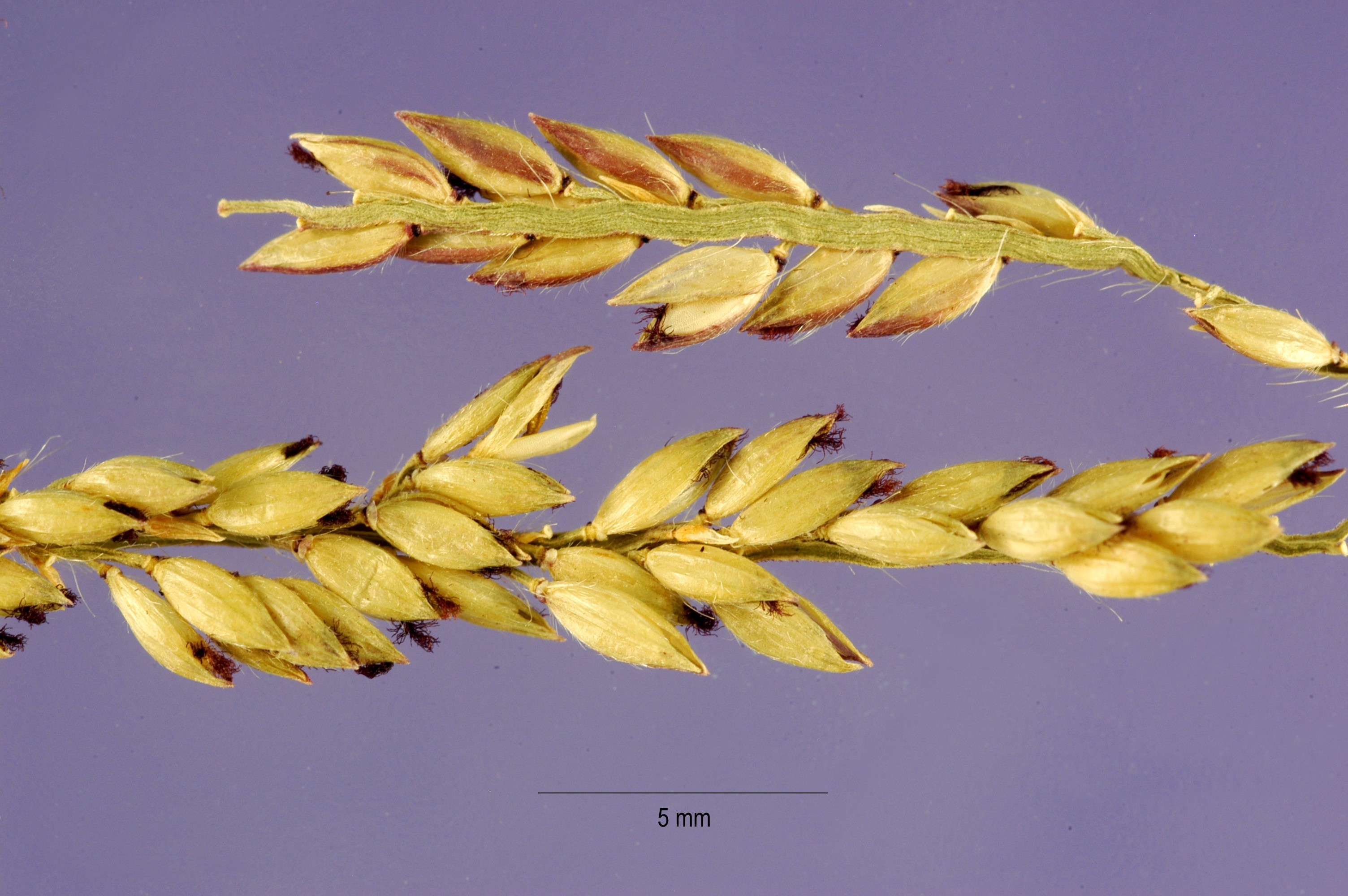
- Eriochloa polystachya

Scientific classification
- Kingdom: Plantae
- Clade: Tracheophytes
- Clade: Angiosperms
- Clade: Monocots
- Clade: Commelinids
- Order: Poales
- Family: Poaceae
- Subfamily: Panicoideae
- Supertribe: Panicodae
- Tribe: Paniceae
- Subtribe: Melinidinae
- Genus: Eriochloa; Kunth

Type species
- Eriochloa distachya Kunth

Synonyms
- Helopus Trin.; Oedipachne Link; Aglycia Willd. ex Steud.; Alycia Willd. ex Steud.

= Eriochloa =

Genus of grasses

Eriochloa is a widespread genus of plants in the grass family, commonly called cupgrass. They are found across much of Africa, Asia, Australia, and the Americas, plus a few places in European Russia.

Species

- Eriochloa acuminata – tapertip cupgrass - Mexico, southern USA (from CA to MD + FL), northern Argentina
- Eriochloa aristata – bearded cupgrass - Mexico, USA (AZ, CA, MS)
- Eriochloa australiensis - Australia
- Eriochloa boliviensis - Bolivia
- Eriochloa boxiana - Mexico, Central America, Lesser Antilles, Colombia, Venezuela
- Eriochloa contracta – prairie cupgrass - Mexico, USA (from CA to FL to MN), Ontario
- Eriochloa crebra - Australia
- Eriochloa distachya - Central + South America
- Eriochloa fatmensis – tropical cupgrass - sub-Saharan Africa, Madagascar, Arabian Peninsula
- Eriochloa grandiflora - Santa Cruz in Bolivia, Paraguay, Misiones in Argentina, Minas Gerais in Brazil
- Eriochloa lemmonii – canyon cupgrass - USA (AZ, NM), northern + central Mexico
- Eriochloa macclounii - Tanzania, Malawi, Zambia, Zimbabwe, Mozambique, Botswana
- Eriochloa meyeriana - sub-Saharan Africa, Aldabra, Madagascar, Yemen
- Eriochloa michauxii – long-leaved cupgrass - USA (AL FL GA SC)
- Eriochloa montevidensis - Uruguay, Paraguay, Brazil, Bolivia, Chile, Argentina, Ecuador
- Eriochloa nana - Argentina (Formosa, Corrientes, Santiago del Estero)
- Eriochloa nelsonii - Mexico, Central America
- Eriochloa pacifica - Peru, Ecuador incl Galápagos
- Eriochloa parvispiculata - Kenya, Tanzania, Mozambique, Malawi, Eswatini, Limpopo, Mpumalanga, KwaZulu-Natal
- Eriochloa peruviana - Peru, Ecuador
- Eriochloa polystachya – caribgrass - Chiapas, Central America, West Indies, northern South America
- Eriochloa procera - Australia, New Guinea, southeast Asia, China, Indian Subcontinent, East Africa
- Eriochloa pseudoacrotricha - Australia
- Eriochloa punctata – Louisiana cupgrass - Central America, West Indies, South America, Mexico, USA (TX LA GA MD)
- Eriochloa rovumensis - Tanzania, Mozambique
- Eriochloa sericea – Texas cupgrass - USA (TX OK KS), Coahuila, Tamaulipas
- Eriochloa setosa - Cuba
- Eriochloa stapfiana - Madagascar, Kenya, Tanzania, Mozambique, Eswatini, Limpopo, Mpumalanga, KwaZulu-Natal
- Eriochloa stevensii - Costa Rica, Nicaragua, Ecuador, Venezuela, Peru
- Eriochloa subulifera - Aldabra, Madagascar
- Eriochloa succincta - southern European Russia, Caucasus, Iran, Iraq, Kazakhstan, Uzbekistan, Turkmenistan, Tajikistan
- Eriochloa tridentata - Brazil, Bolivia, Argentina
- Eriochloa villosa – hairy cupgrass - Russia (Amur, Primorye, Khabarovsk), China incl Taiwan, Korea, Vietnam, Japan incl Ryukyu Is
- Eriochloa weberbaueri - Peru, Ecuador

formerly included

see Ancistrachne Axonopus Brachiaria Isachne Panicum Paspalum Tricholaena Urochloa

- Eriochloa acrotricha - Panicum acrotrichum
- Eriochloa bolbodes - Urochloa oligotricha
- Eriochloa brasiliensis - Axonopus brasiliensis
- Eriochloa castanea - Paspalum macranthecium
- Eriochloa globosa - Isachne globosa
- Eriochloa japonica - Isachne globosa
- Eriochloa maidenii - Ancistrachne maidenii
- Eriochloa pulchella - Panicum pulchellum
- Eriochloa purpurascens Hochst. ex A.Rich. 1850 - Brachiaria serrata
- Eriochloa purpurascens Hochst. 1841 - Panicum gossypinum
- Eriochloa trichopus - Urochloa trichopus
- Eriochloa vestita - Tricholaena vestita
