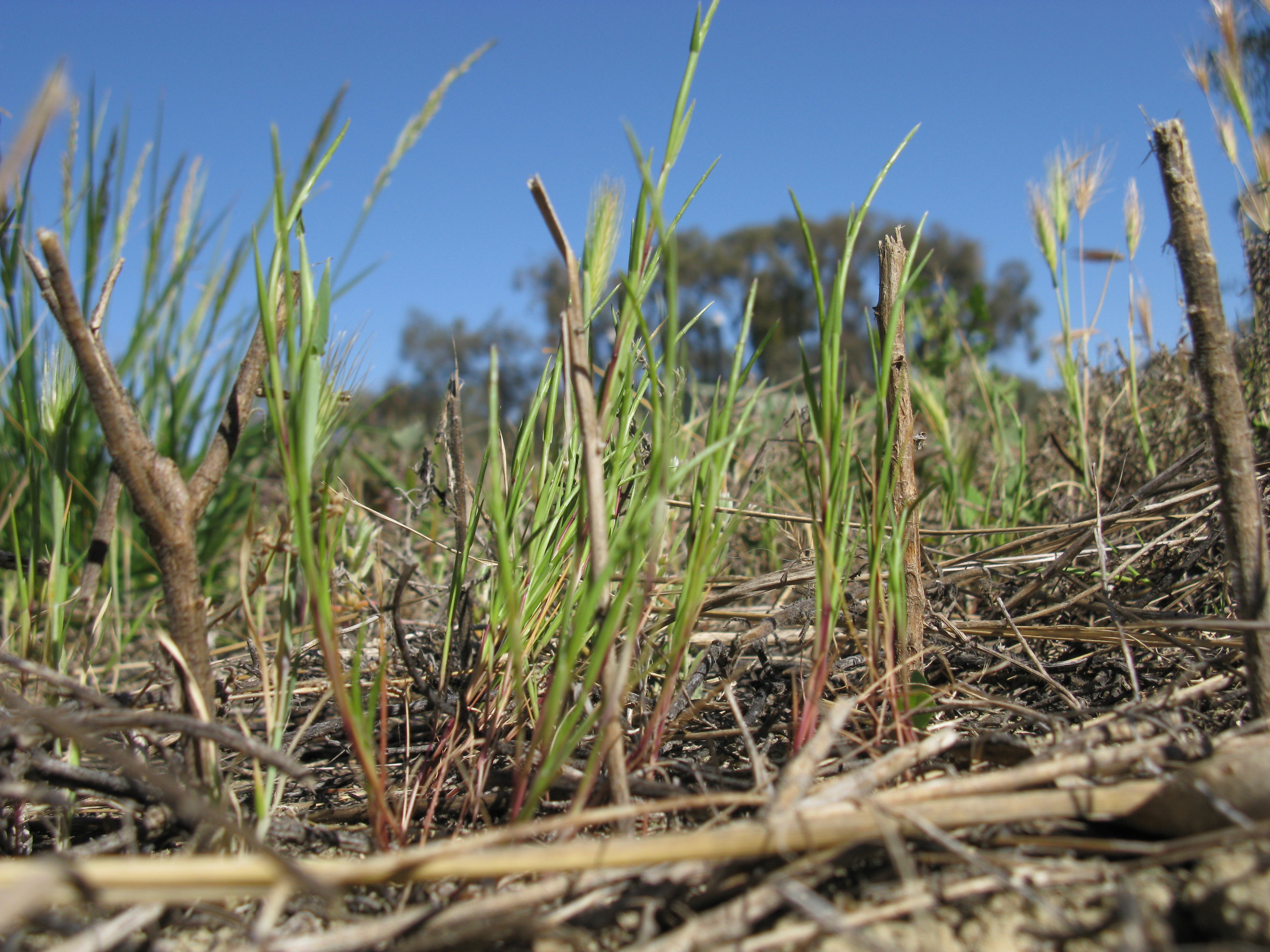

Scientific classification
- Kingdom: Plantae
- Clade: Tracheophytes
- Clade: Angiosperms
- Clade: Monocots
- Clade: Commelinids
- Order: Poales
- Family: Poaceae
- Subfamily: Pooideae
- Genus: Parapholis
- Species: P. incurva

Binomial name
- Parapholis incurva (L.) C.E.Hubb.

= Parapholis incurva =

Species of plant

Parapholis incurva is a species of grass native to Europe, Asia and northern Africa, and widely naturalised elsewhere. Common names include coast barbgrass, curved sea hard grass, curved hard-grass, sicklegrass, curved sicklegrass and curved parapholis.

== Description ==
It is a tufted annual bunchgrass up to 30 centimetres high, with green flowers.

== Taxonomy ==
It was first published as Aegilops incurva by Carl Linnaeus, and transferred into Parapholis by Charles Edward Hubbard in 1946.

== Distribution and habitat ==
It is widespread in the old world, occurring in northern Africa, Europe, and Asia. It has widely naturalised elsewhere.
