= Limnopoa =

Conservation status
- Endangered (IUCN 3.1)

Scientific classification
- Kingdom: Plantae
- Clade: Tracheophytes
- Clade: Angiosperms
- Clade: Monocots
- Clade: Commelinids
- Order: Poales
- Family: Poaceae
- Subfamily: Micrairoideae
- Tribe: Isachneae
- Genus: Limnopoa; C.E.Hubb.
- Species: L. meeboldii

Binomial name
- Limnopoa meeboldii (C.E.C.Fisch.) C.E.Hubb.

Synonyms
- Coelachne meeboldii C.E.C.Fisch.

Genus of grasses

Limnopoa is a genus of Indian plants in the grass family. The only known species is Limnopoa meeboldii, native to the State of Kerala in southern India.
