= Helopus =

Helopus from the Ancient Greek meaning "marsh foot" can refer to three types of living organism:

- A sauropod dinosaur, now known as Euhelopus
- Helopus (bird), a genus of bird, now known as Hydroprogne
- Helopus, a genus of grasses in the family Poaceae; synonym of Eriochloa
