= Charles Edward Hubbard =

British botanist

Charles Edward Hubbard CBE (23 May 1900 – 8 May 1980) was a British botanist, specialising in agrostology – the study of grasses. He was considered "the world authority on the classification and recognition of grasses" in his time.

He is indicated by the author abbreviation C.E.Hubb. when citing a botanical name.

== Biography ==
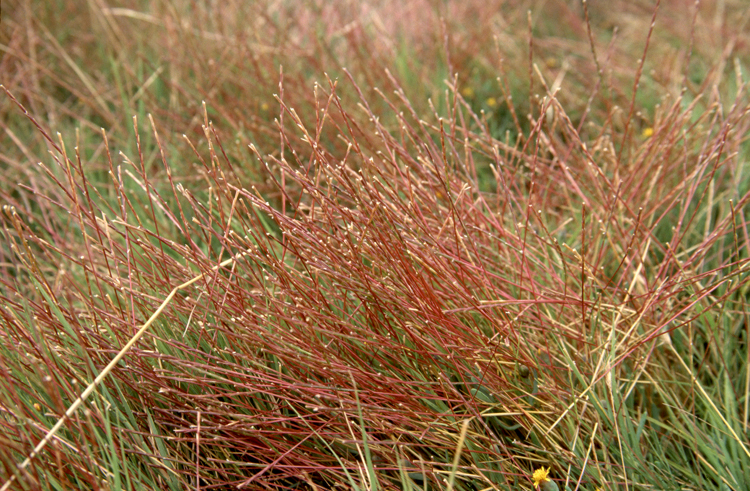
The genus Parapholis (Parapholis strigosa pictured) was described by Hubbard in 1946.

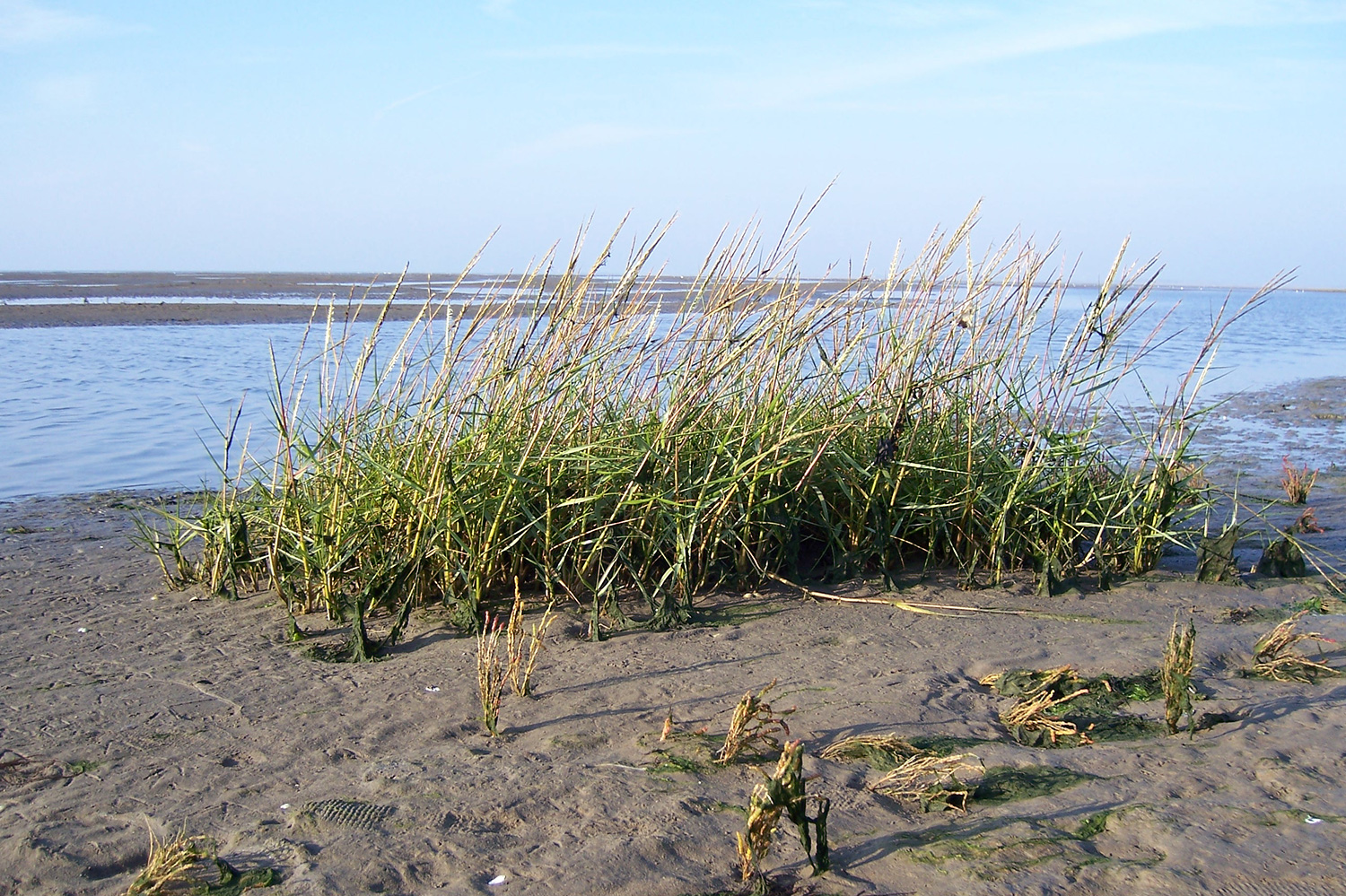
The maritime grass Spartina anglica was first validly described by C. E. Hubbard in 1978.

Charles Edward Hubbard was born on 23 May 1900 in Appleton, a hamlet on the Sandringham Estate in Norfolk, where his father, also named Charles Edward Hubbard, was the head gardener at Appleton House to Maud of Wales, the Queen of Norway. He was schooled at Sandringham, and at King Edward VII Grammar School in King's Lynn, before joining the staff of the Royal Gardens at Sandringham in 1916. During his time there, he also spent five months at the Bygdøy Royal Estate near Oslo, and served for seven months in the Royal Air Force.

=== Kew Gardens ===
In April 1920, Hubbard left the Sandringham Estate to join the Royal Botanic Gardens, Kew, initially working in the temperate house and arboretum. In September 1922, he gained a position in the herbarium, working at first under Stephen Troyte Dunn, and later under Otto Stapf. Hubbard published his first scientific paper in 1925, describing two new species in the genus Stipa. In 1927, he married Madeleine Grace Witham, with whom he fathered a son, John.

At the request of the Government of Queensland, Hubbard travelled to Australia in 1930, in exchange for the Australian botanist W. D. Francis, who spent a year at Kew. He visited the herbaria in Sydney, Melbourne, Adelaide and Perth, as well as examining every grass specimen in the Queensland Herbarium in Brisbane. He carried out field work around Rockhampton and the Fitzroy River in central Queensland, accumulating 15,000 specimens.

During the Second World War, the Kew Herbarium was evacuated to Oxford and Hubbard moved with it, keeping his British herbarium at 9 Crick Road, the former residence of George Claridge Druce, while the Kew Herbarium was housed in the basement of the Bodleian Library.

On 1 October 1957, Hubbard was promoted to Keeper of the Herbarium and Library at Kew, and rose to deputy director in April 1959. His first wife died in 1961. and in 1963, Hubbard married Florence Kate Hubbard, his second cousin by marriage. On 30 November 1965, he retired and moved to Hampton, Middlesex, close to Kew. He died on 8 May 1980.

== Works ==
Hubbard published a long series of scientific articles, chiefly on the grasses of Europe and tropical Africa, but also covering the grasses of the West Indies, Mauritius, British Malaya, and Fiji. He edited the exsiccata work Gramineae Britannicae exsiccatae ex herbario Kewensi distributae. Hubbard is perhaps better remembered for his popular science book Grasses: a Guide to their Structure, Identification, Uses and Distribution in the British Isles, published in 1954, with a second edition following in 1968.

== Accolades ==
Hubbard was the recipient of a number of awards, including the OBE (1954), CBE (1965), the Linnean Gold Medal (1967) and the Veitch Memorial Medal (1970). He was awarded a D.Sc. degree honoris causa by the University of Reading (1960).

A number of botanical names commemorate Hubbard, including Acacia hubbardiana, Digitaria hubbardii, Hubbardochloa (and thus also the subtribe Hubbardochloinae), Hubbardia (and thus also the tribe Hubbardieae) and Pandanus hubbardii.

== See also ==
- Agrostologists
- 20th-century botanists
