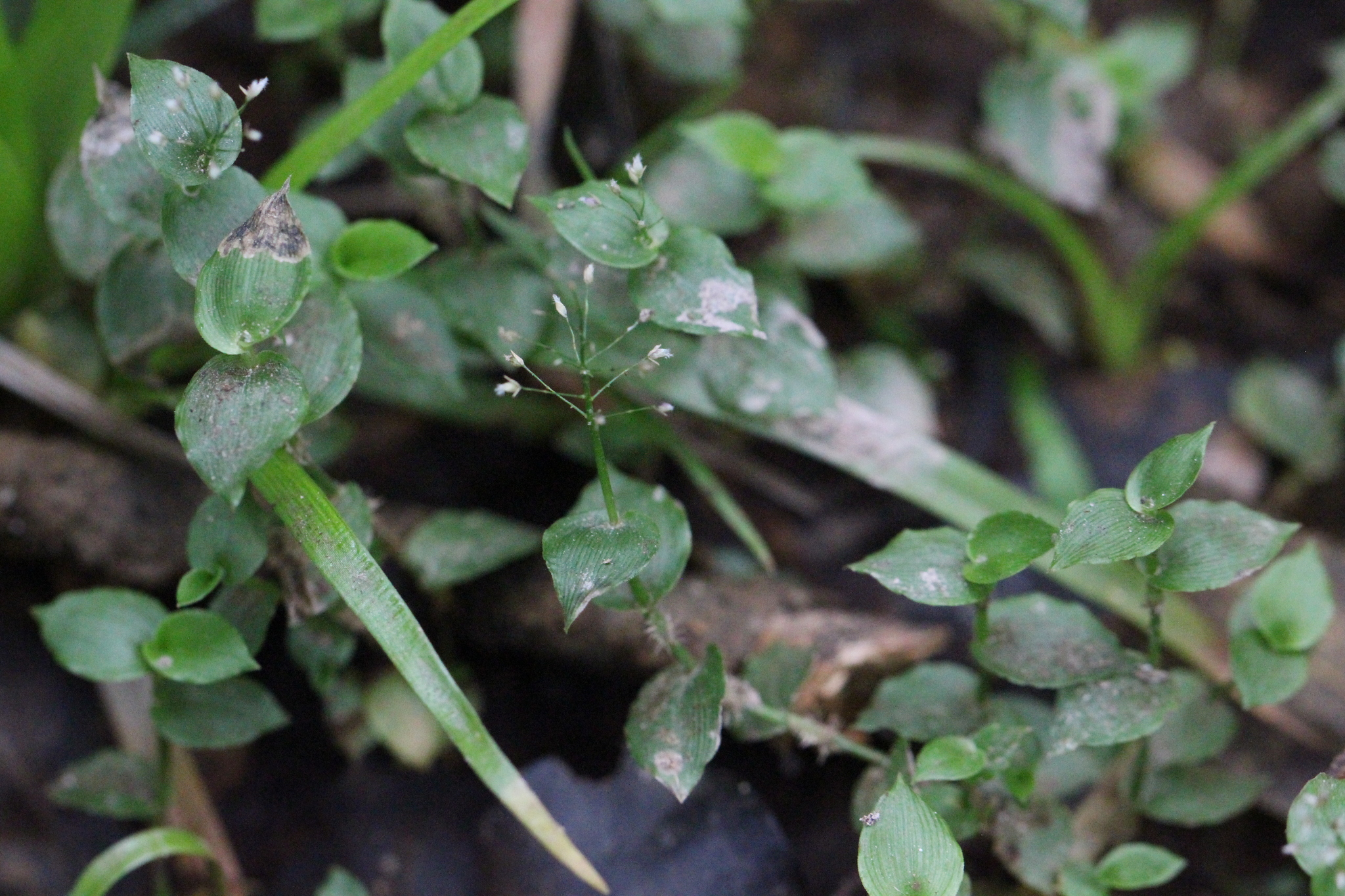

Scientific classification
- Kingdom: Plantae
- Clade: Tracheophytes
- Clade: Angiosperms
- Clade: Monocots
- Clade: Commelinids
- Order: Poales
- Family: Poaceae
- Subfamily: Micrairoideae
- Tribe: Isachneae
- Genus: Sphaerocaryum; Nees ex Hook.f.
- Species: S. malaccense

Binomial name
- Sphaerocaryum malaccense (Trin.) Pilg.

Synonyms
- Steudelella Honda; Graya Arn. ex Steud. 1854, illegitimate homonym not Endl. 1841 (Amaranthaceae); Sphaerocaryum elegans Nees ex Steud. (type species); Panicum malaccense Trin.; Agrostis malaccensis (Trin.) Willd. ex Kunth; Graya elegans Arn. ex Steud.; Panicum barbivaginale Hayata

= Sphaerocaryum =

Genus of grasses

Sphaerocaryum is a genus of Asian plants in the grass family. The only known species is Sphaerocaryum malaccense, native to southern China, Indochina, the Indian subcontinent, Peninsular Malaysia, Philippines, and Sumatra. (Isachne pulchella was formerly included in this genus, as Sphaerocaryum pulchellum.)
