= Hubbardochloa =

Conservation status
- Data Deficient (IUCN 3.1)

Scientific classification
- Kingdom: Plantae
- Clade: Tracheophytes
- Clade: Angiosperms
- Clade: Monocots
- Clade: Commelinids
- Order: Poales
- Family: Poaceae
- Subfamily: Chloridoideae
- Tribe: Cynodonteae
- Subtribe: Hubbardochloinae
- Genus: Hubbardochloa; Auquier
- Species: H. gracilis

Binomial name
- Hubbardochloa gracilis Auquier

Genus of grasses

Hubbardochloa is a genus of African plants in the grass family. It was named after British botanist Charles Edward Hubbard (1900–1980). The only known species is Hubbardochloa gracilis, native to Rwanda, Burundi, and Zambia.
