= Pheidochloa =

Scientific classification
- Kingdom: Plantae
- Clade: Tracheophytes
- Clade: Angiosperms
- Clade: Monocots
- Clade: Commelinids
- Order: Poales
- Family: Poaceae
- Subfamily: Micrairoideae
- Tribe: Eriachneae
- Genus: Pheidochloa; S.T.Blake

Type species
- Pheidochloa gracilis S.T.Blake

Genus of grasses

Pheidochloa is a genus of Australian and Papuasian plants in the grass family.

Species

- Pheidochloa gracilis S.T.Blake - New Guinea, Queensland, Northern Territory, Western Australia
- Pheidochloa vulpioides Veldkamp - New Guinea
