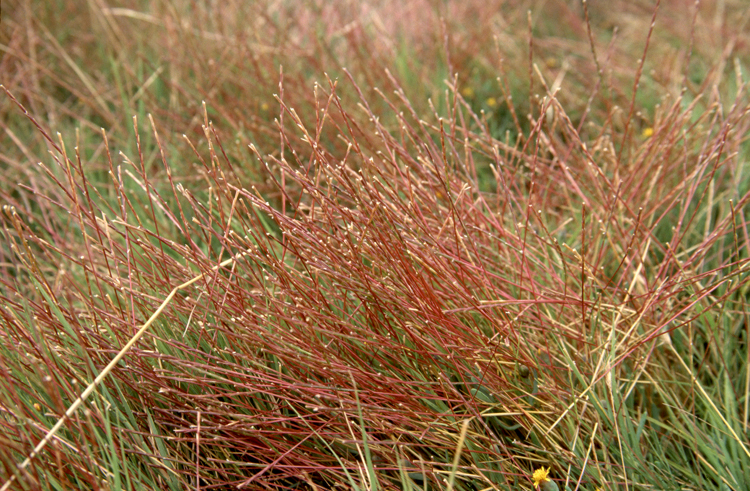
- Parapholis strigosa

Scientific classification
- Kingdom: Plantae
- Clade: Tracheophytes
- Clade: Angiosperms
- Clade: Monocots
- Clade: Commelinids
- Order: Poales
- Family: Poaceae
- Subfamily: Pooideae
- Supertribe: Poodae
- Tribe: Poeae
- Subtribe: Parapholiinae
- Genus: Parapholis; C.E.Hubb.

Type species
- Parapholis incurva (L.) C.E.Hubb.

Synonyms
- Lepidurus Janch.

= Parapholis =

Genus of grasses

Parapholis is a genus of Eurasian and North African flowering plants in the grass family.

== Species ==
- Parapholis filiformis (Roth) C.E.Hubb. - from Madeira to Turkey
- Parapholis gracilis Bor - Caucasus, Iraq, Iran, Jordan, and Israel.
- Parapholis incurva (L.) C.E.Hubb. - from England + Canary Islands to Tajikistan; naturalised in Australia, New Zealand, scattered sites in North + South America
- Parapholis marginata Runemark - from Morocco + Balearic Islands to Turkey
- Parapholis pycnantha (Hack.) C.E.Hubb. - from Canary Islands to Turkey
- Parapholis strigosa (Dumort.) C.E.Hubb. - from Ireland + Denmark to Libya
