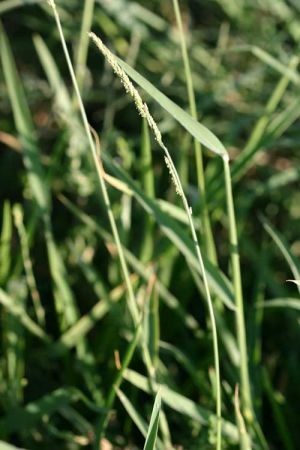

Scientific classification
- Kingdom: Plantae
- Clade: Tracheophytes
- Clade: Angiosperms
- Clade: Monocots
- Clade: Commelinids
- Order: Poales
- Family: Poaceae
- Subfamily: Panicoideae
- Genus: Eriochloa
- Species: E. contracta

Binomial name
- Eriochloa contracta Hitchc.

= Eriochloa contracta =

Species of grass

Eriochloa contracta is a species of grass known by the common name prairie cupgrass. It is native to the central United States and it is naturalized in areas to the east and west, where it is often a weed, especially in moist areas. This annual grass may grow up to a meter tall when erect or it may bend, rooting where nodes on the stem touch the ground. The inflorescence is up to 20 centimeters long and is made up of several branches which stick out to the sides. The branches are lined with purplish spikelets a few millimeters long.

Prairie cupgrass is one of a number of species that can cause photosensitivity in humans.
