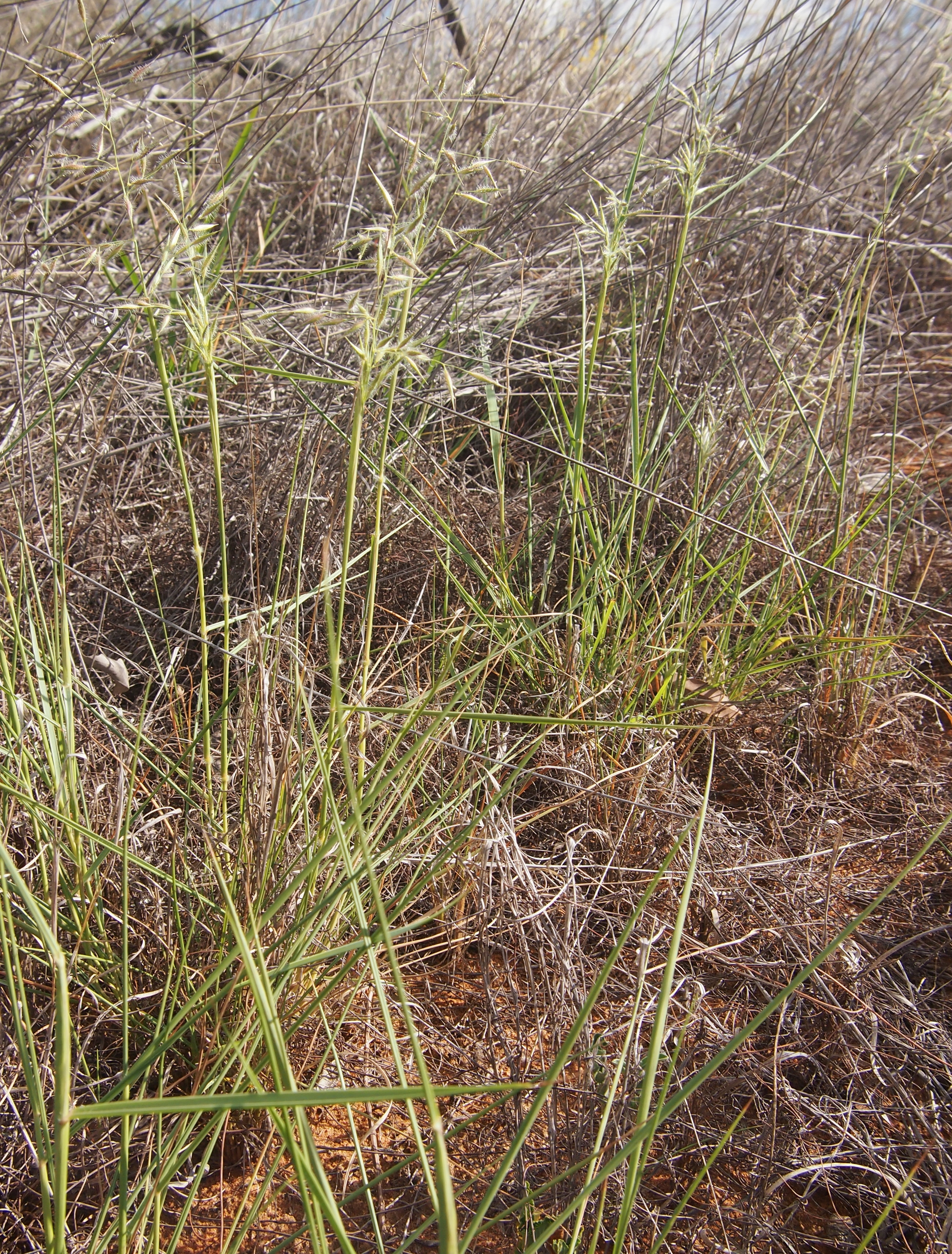
- Eriachne aristidea

Scientific classification
- Kingdom: Plantae
- Clade: Tracheophytes
- Clade: Angiosperms
- Clade: Monocots
- Clade: Commelinids
- Order: Poales
- Family: Poaceae
- Subfamily: Micrairoideae
- Tribe: Eriachneae
- Genus: Eriachne; R.Br. 1810 not Phil. 1870

Type species
- Eriachne squarrosa R.Br.

Synonyms
- Achneria P.Beauv.; Massia Balansa

= Eriachne =

Wanderrie grass

Genus of grasses

Eriachne, commonly known as Wanderrie grass, is a genus of plants in the grass family. Most of the species are found only in Australia, with the ranges of a few extending northward into New Guinea, parts of Asia, and Micronesia.

It is found in areas such as the Western Australian Mulga shrublands ecoregion.

Around 48 species are recognised:

- Eriachne agrostidea – NT, Qld
- Eriachne aristidea – NT, Qld, WA, SA, NSW
- Eriachne armitii – NT, Qld, WA, New Guinea
- Eriachne avenacea – NT, WA
- Eriachne axillaris – NT
- Eriachne basalis – NT, Qld
- Eriachne basedowii – NT
- Eriachne benthamii – NT, Qld, WA, SA
- Eriachne bleeseri – NT
- Eriachne burkittii – NT, Qld, WA, New Guinea
- Eriachne capillaris – NT
- Eriachne ciliata – NT, Qld, WA
- Eriachne compacta – NT
- Eriachne fastigiata – NT, WA
- Eriachne festucacea – NT, WA
- Eriachne filiformis – NT, Qld, WA
- Eriachne flaccida – NT, Qld, WA, SA
- Eriachne gardneri – WA
- Eriachne glabrata – Qld, NSW
- Eriachne glandulosa – NT, WA
- Eriachne glauca – NT, Qld, WA
- Eriachne helmsii – NT, Qld, WA, SA, NSW
- Eriachne humilis – NT, Qld, New Guinea
- Eriachne imbricata – WA
- Eriachne insularis – Qld
- Eriachne lanata – WA
- Eriachne major – NT, Qld, WA
- Eriachne melicacea – NT, Qld, WA
- Eriachne minuta – NT
- Eriachne mucronata – NT, Qld, WA, SA, NSW
- Eriachne nervosa – NT, Qld, WA
- Eriachne nodosa – NT, WA
- Eriachne obtusa – NT, Qld, WA, New Guinea
- Eriachne ovata – NT, Qld, WA, SA
- Eriachne pallescens – Southeast Asia, Indian subcontinent, Fujian, Guangdong, Guangxi, Jiangxi, Nansei Shoto, New Guinea, NT, Qld, NSW, Caroline Islands
- Eriachne pauciflora – NT, WA
- Eriachne pulchella – NT, Qld, WA, SA, NSW
- Eriachne rara – Qld, NSW
- Eriachne schultziana – NT
- Eriachne scleranthoides – NT, Qld, SA
- Eriachne semiciliata – NT, Qld, WA
- Eriachne squarrosa – NT, Qld, WA, New Guinea, Maluku
- Eriachne stipacea – NT, Qld, WA
- Eriachne sulcata – NT, WA
- Eriachne tenuiculmis – WA
- Eriachne triodioides – NT, Qld, WA
- Eriachne triseta – India, Sri Lanka, Indochina, Malaysia, Indonesia, Philippines, New Guinea, NT, Qld, WA
- Eriachne vesiculosa – NT, Qld

== Former species ==
Several other species were formerly included (see Alloteropsis, Deschampsia, Digitaria and Pentameris).

- Eriachne ampla – Pentameris ampla
- Eriachne assimilis – Pentameris ecklonii
- Eriachne aurea – Pentameris aurea
- Eriachne capensis – Pentameris malouinensis
- Eriachne ecklonii – Pentameris ecklonii
- Eriachne malouinensis – Pentameris malouinensis
- Eriachne melicacea var. fragrans – Alloteropsis cimicina
- Eriachne microphylla – Pentameris microphylla
- Eriachne montana – Deschampsia flexuosa
- Eriachne pallida – Pentameris ampla
- Eriachne rigida – Digitaria californica
- Eriachne steudelii – Pentameris malouinensis
- Eriachne tuberculata Nees 1841 not Domin 1912 – Pentameris setifolia
