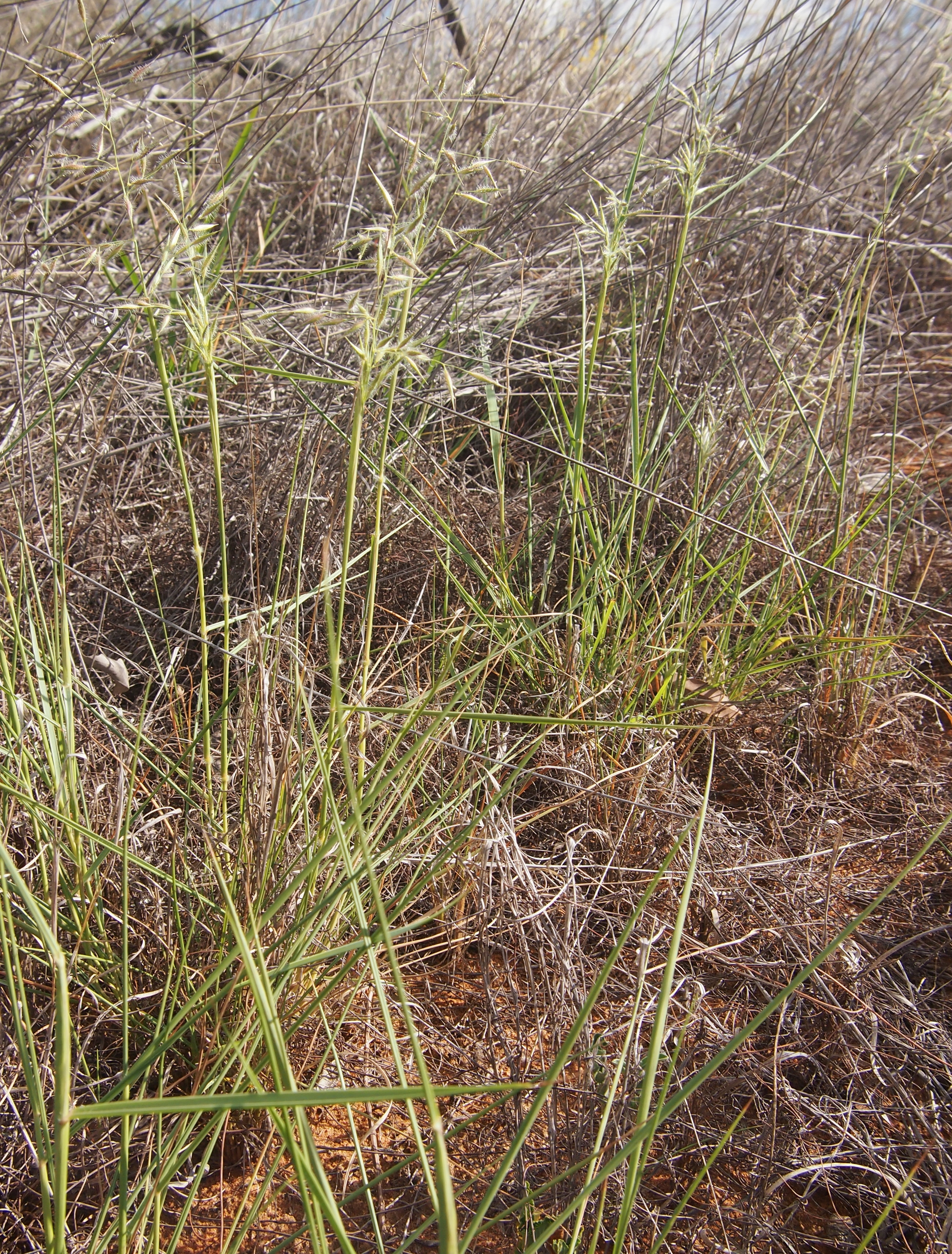
- Wanderrie grass (Eriachne aristidea)

Scientific classification
- Kingdom: Plantae
- Clade: Tracheophytes
- Clade: Angiosperms
- Clade: Monocots
- Clade: Commelinids
- Order: Poales
- Family: Poaceae
- Clade: PACMAD clade
- Subfamily: Micrairoideae
- Tribe: Eriachneae; Eck-Borsboom (1980)

Genera
- Eriachne; Pheidochloa

= Eriachneae =

Tribe of grasses

Eriachneae is a tribe of grasses in subfamily Micrairoideae, with 50 species in two genera. Species in the tribe use the C_{4} photosynthetic pathway and are distributed mainly in Australasia, reaching into Asia and Micronesia.

== Genera ==
- Eriachne
- Pheidochloa
