= Hubbardia =

Scientific classification
- Kingdom: Plantae
- Clade: Embryophytes
- Clade: Tracheophytes
- Clade: Spermatophytes
- Clade: Angiosperms
- Clade: Monocots
- Clade: Commelinids
- Order: Poales
- Family: Poaceae
- Subfamily: Micrairoideae
- Tribe: Isachneae
- Genus: Hubbardia; Bor

Type species
- Hubbardia heptaneuron Bor

Genus of grasses

Hubbardia is a genus in the grass family that is endemic to India. It is the only genus in the tribe Hubbardieae of the subfamily Micrairoideae.

== Species ==
Species include:

- Hubbardia diandra Chandore, Gosavi & S.R.Yadav — native to the Western Ghats, in Maharashtra and Karnataka states.
- Hubbardia heptaneuron Bor — native to Karnataka state.
