= Isachne meeboldii =

Conservation status
- Critically Endangered (IUCN 3.1)

Scientific classification
- Kingdom: Plantae
- Clade: Tracheophytes
- Clade: Angiosperms
- Clade: Monocots
- Clade: Commelinids
- Order: Poales
- Family: Poaceae
- Genus: Isachne
- Species: I. meeboldii

Binomial name
- Isachne meeboldii C.E.C.Fisch.

Species of grass

Isachne meeboldii is a critically endangered species of herb endemic to open grasslands in Western Ghats of India. It has been reported from Shimoga and Kumsi in the state of Karnataka and Aurangabad in Maharashtra.
