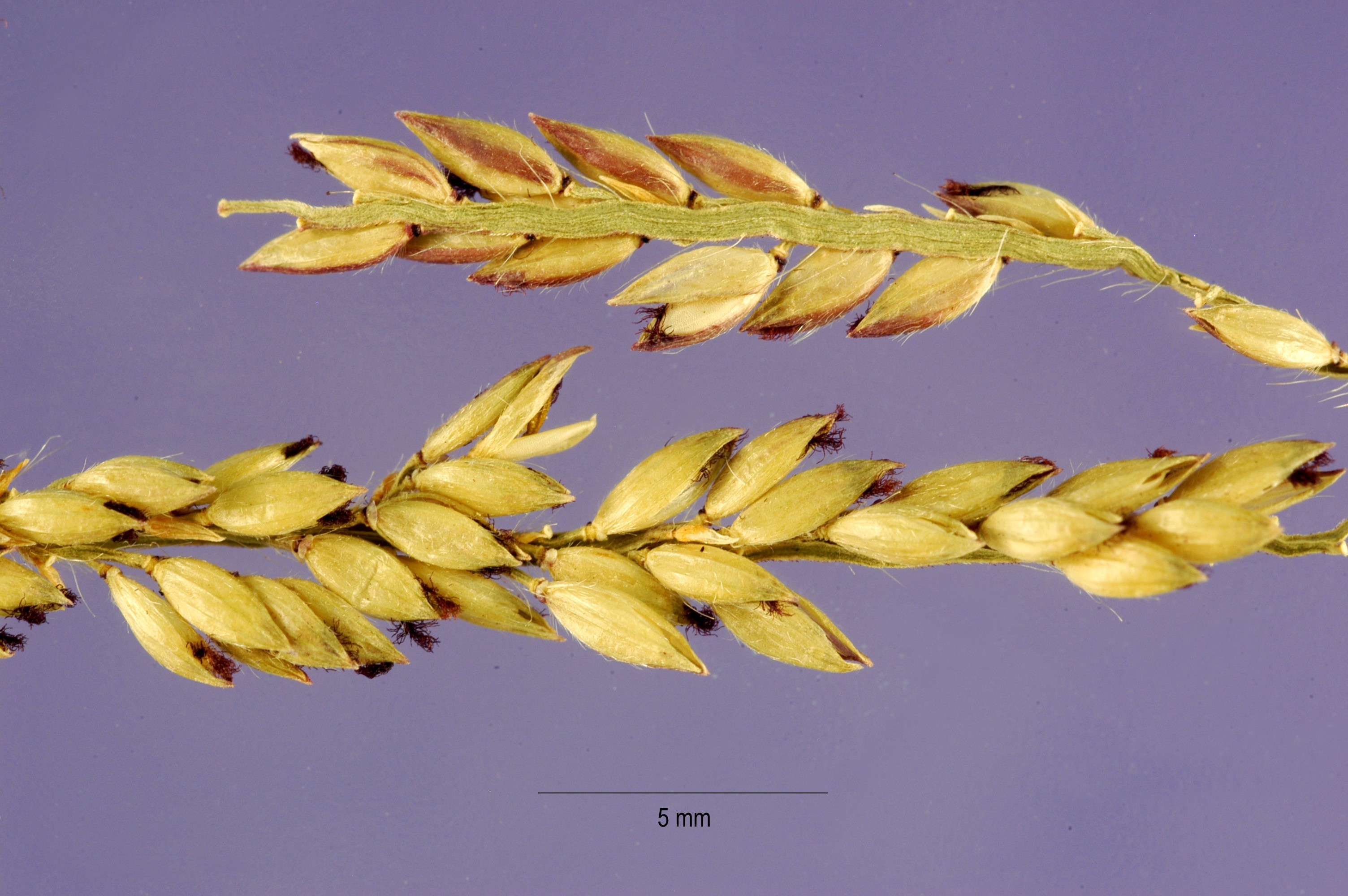

Scientific classification
- Kingdom: Plantae
- Clade: Tracheophytes
- Clade: Angiosperms
- Clade: Monocots
- Clade: Commelinids
- Order: Poales
- Family: Poaceae
- Subfamily: Panicoideae
- Genus: Eriochloa
- Species: E. polystachya

Binomial name
- Eriochloa polystachya Kunth

= Eriochloa polystachya =

Species of plant

Eriochloa polystachya is a species of grass known by the common name Caribbean cupgrass. It is native to the West Indies, Costa Rica, Honduras, South America, Florida and Texas.
