= Isachne veldkampii =

Conservation status
- Critically Endangered (IUCN 3.1)

Scientific classification
- Kingdom: Plantae
- Clade: Tracheophytes
- Clade: Angiosperms
- Clade: Monocots
- Clade: Commelinids
- Order: Poales
- Family: Poaceae
- Genus: Isachne
- Species: I. veldkampii

Binomial name
- Isachne veldkampii K.G.Bhat & Nagendran

Species of grass

Isachne veldkampii is a critically endangered species of herb endemic to the Western Ghats of India. It has been reported from Manipal in Udupi district in the state of Karnataka. This species was named in honor of Dutch botanist Jan Frederik Veldkamp.
