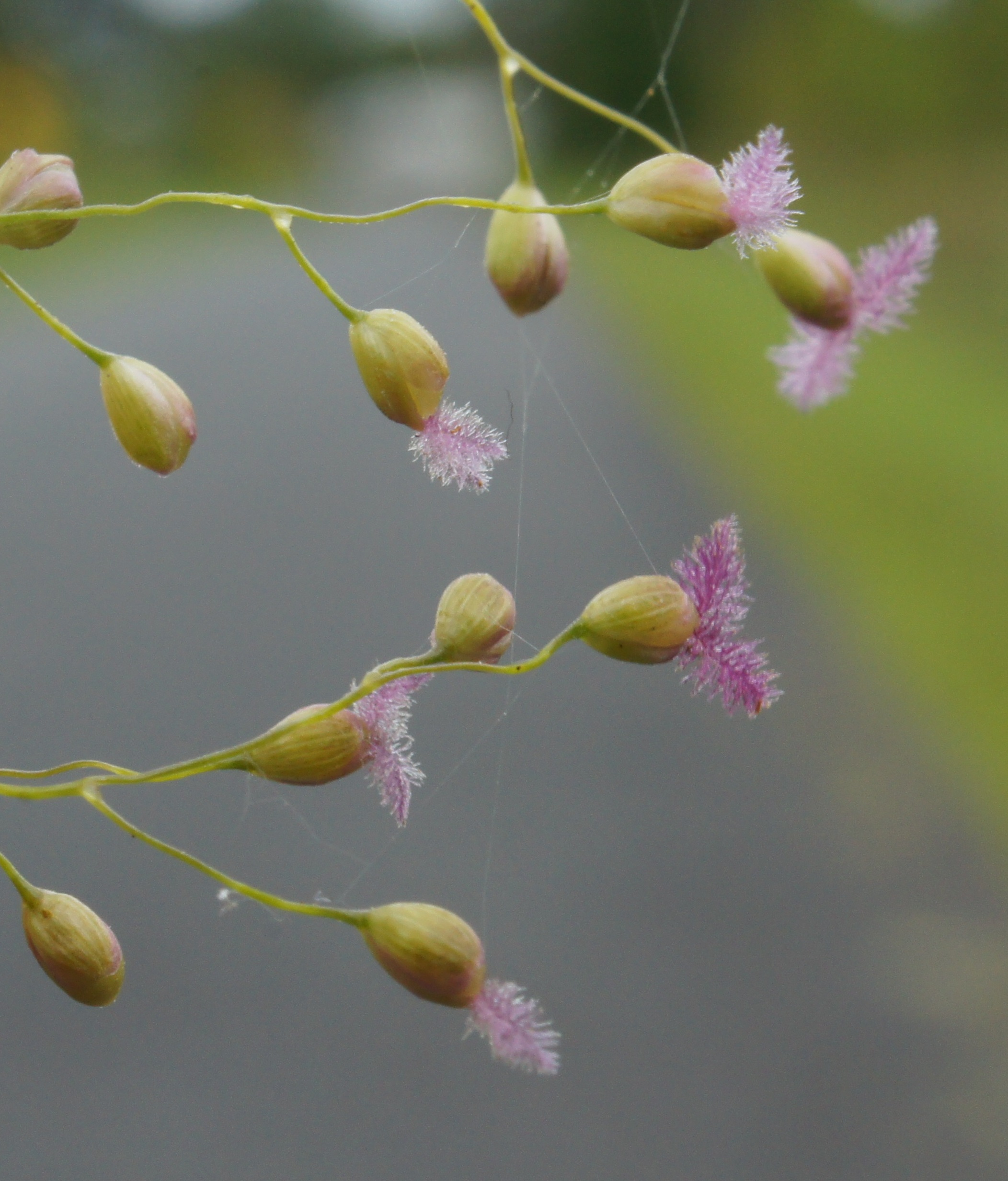
- Isachne globosa spikelets

Scientific classification
- Kingdom: Plantae
- Clade: Tracheophytes
- Clade: Angiosperms
- Clade: Monocots
- Clade: Commelinids
- Order: Poales
- Family: Poaceae
- Clade: PACMAD clade
- Subfamily: Micrairoideae
- Tribe: Isachneae; Benth. (1881)

Genera
- Six genera, see text

Synonyms
- subtribe Isachninae Stapf (1898); tribe Hubbardieae C.E.Hubb. (1960)

= Isachneae =

Tribe of grasses

Isachneae is a tribe of tropical and subtropical grasses in subfamily Micrairoideae, with around 120 species in six genera.

== Genera ==
- Coelachne
- Heteranthoecia
- Hubbardia
- Isachne
- Limnopoa
- Sphaerocaryum
