= Eriochloa sericea =

Conservation status
- Apparently Secure (NatureServe)

Scientific classification
- Kingdom: Plantae
- Clade: Tracheophytes
- Clade: Angiosperms
- Clade: Monocots
- Clade: Commelinids
- Order: Poales
- Family: Poaceae
- Subfamily: Panicoideae
- Genus: Eriochloa
- Species: E. sericea

Binomial name
- Eriochloa sericea (Scheele) Munro ex Vasey

Species of grass

Eriochloa sericea is a species of grass known by the common name Texas cupgrass. It is native to Nebraska, Kansas, Oklahoma, and Texas in the United States and to northern Mexico.

This perennial grass grows up to 3.5 feet tall and forms tufts.

In the wild this grass grows on prairies on rocky, loamy soils.

This is a good grass for grazing livestock. It withstands moderate grazing pressure but not overgrazing.
