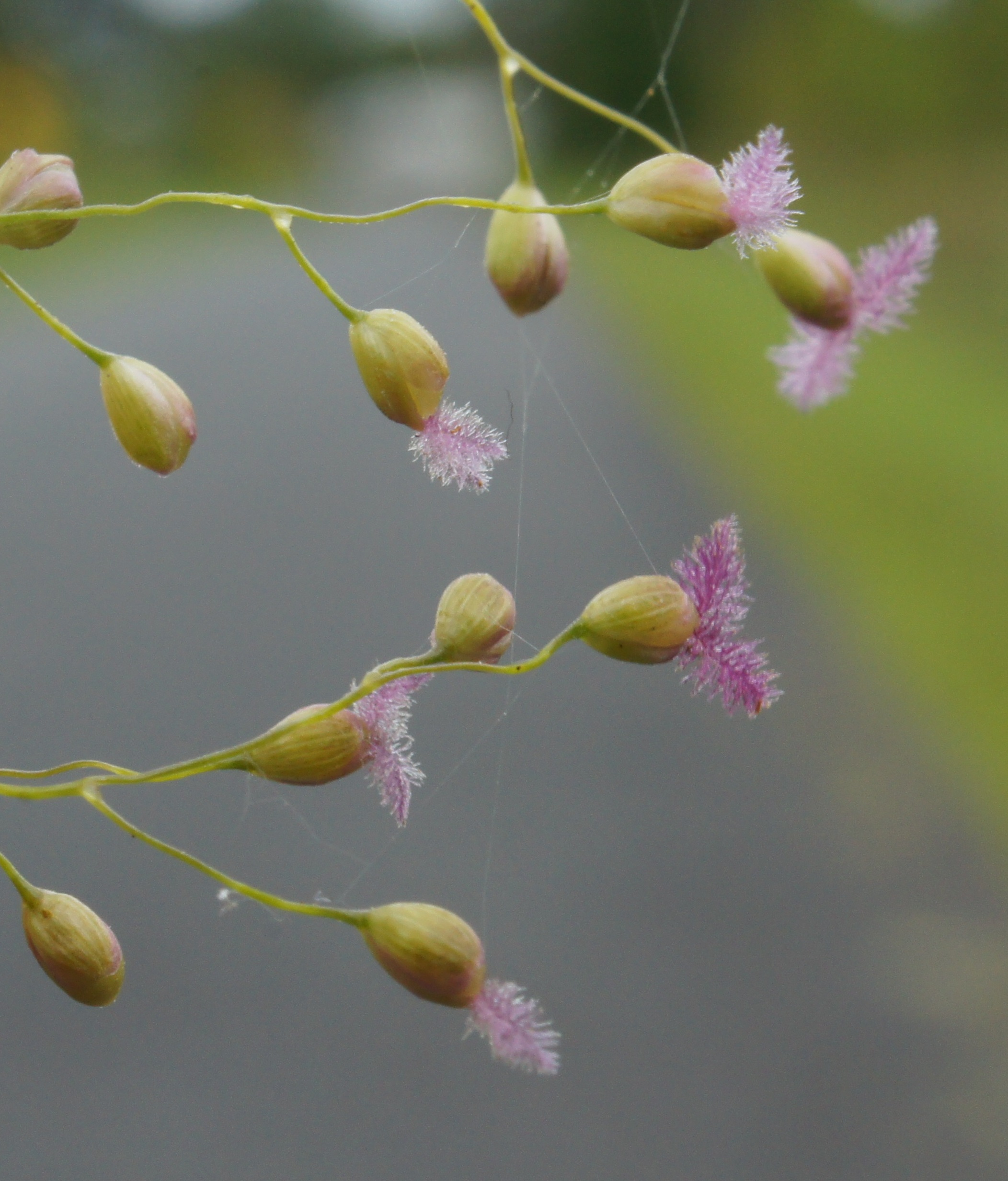
- Isachne globosa

Scientific classification
- Kingdom: Plantae
- Clade: Tracheophytes
- Clade: Angiosperms
- Clade: Monocots
- Clade: Commelinids
- Order: Poales
- Family: Poaceae
- Subfamily: Micrairoideae
- Tribe: Isachneae
- Genus: Isachne; R.Br.

Type species
- Isachne australis (syn of I. globosa) R.Br.

Synonyms
- Panicum sect. Isachne (R. Br.) Trin.

= Isachne =

Genus of grasses

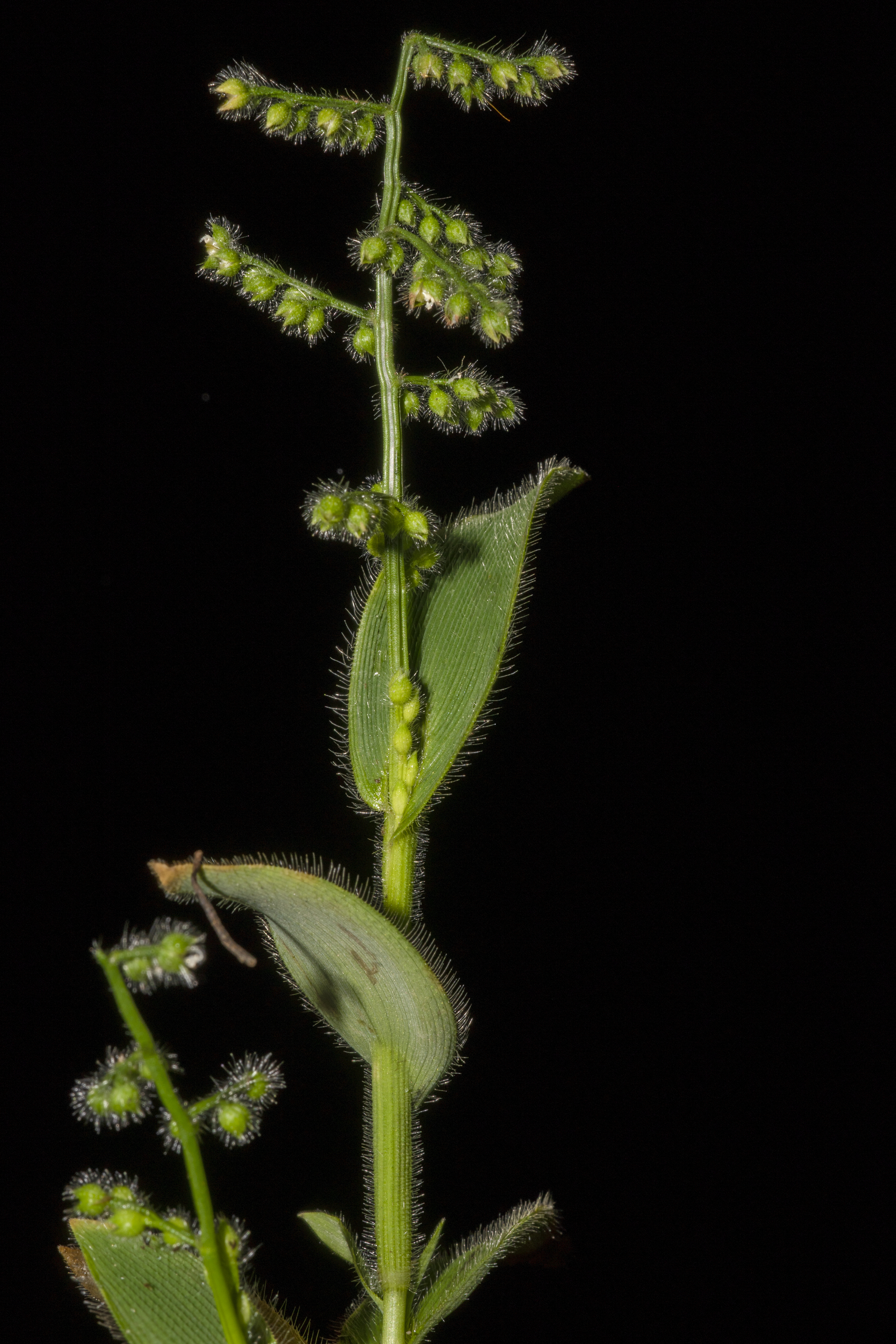
Isachne lisboae Hook. f.

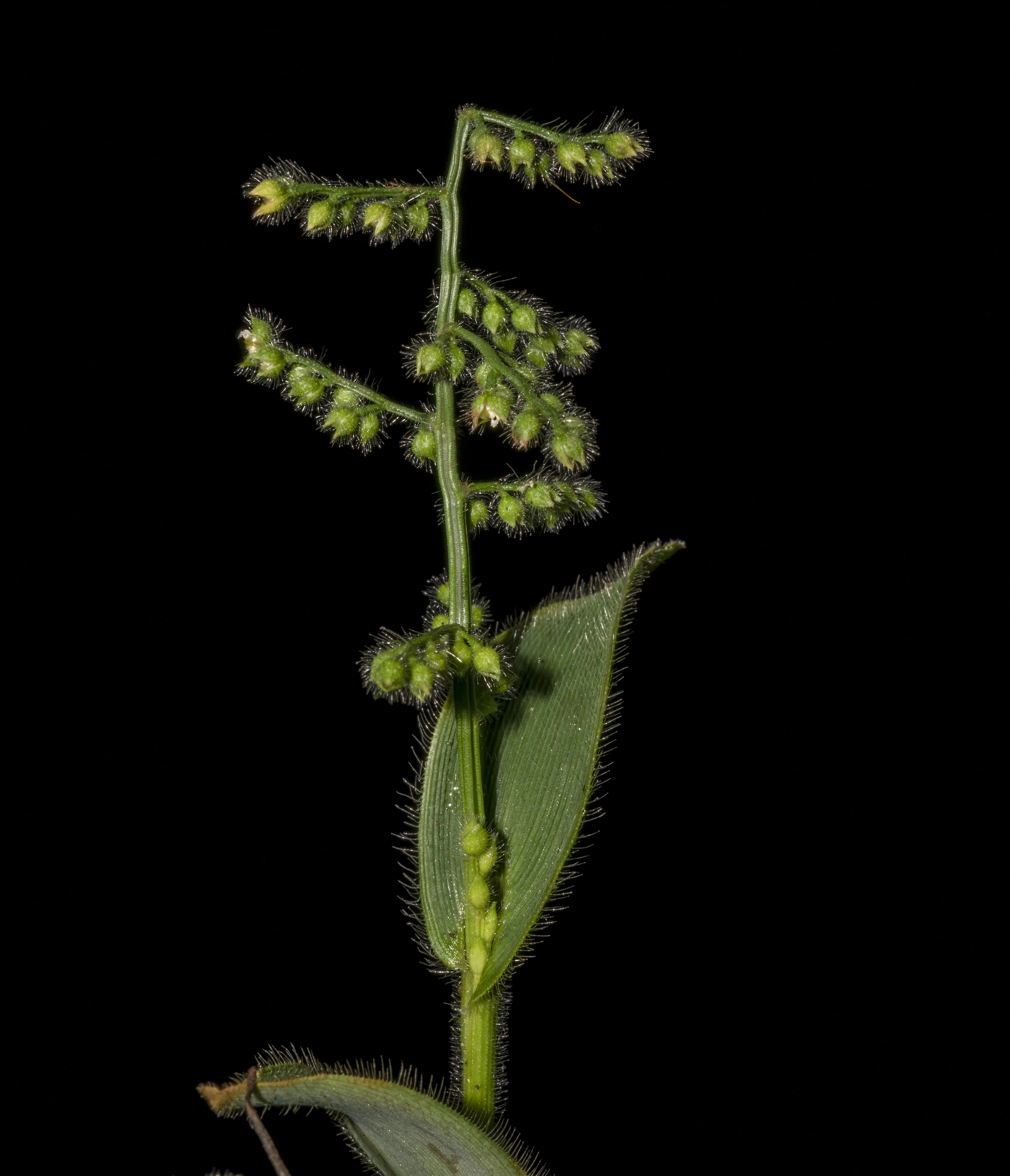
Isachne lisboae Hook. f.

Isachne is a widespread genus of tropical and subtropical plants in the grass family, found in Asia, Africa, Australia, the Americas, and various oceanic islands. They may be known generally as bloodgrasses.

These are annual and perennial grasses. The stems are hollow, the leaves are often nerved, and the inflorescence may be an open or narrow panicle. The spikelets are rounded to spherical. Many species are aquatic. Isachne globosa is a weed of rice cultivation.

Species

- Isachne albens - Southeast Asia, China, Himalayas, New Guinea
- Isachne albomarginata - Borneo, Sulawesi, New Guinea
- Isachne angladei - Tamil Nadu
- Isachne angolensis - tropical Africa
- Isachne angustifolia - Puerto Rico, Lesser Antilles
- Isachne aristatum - Asia, host of Orseolia oryzae
- Isachne arfakensis - New Guinea
- Isachne arundinacea - tropical Americas
- Isachne ascendens - Vietnam
- Isachne bicolor - Maharashtra
- Isachne borii - Maharashtra
- Isachne bourneorum - Tamil Nadu, Kerala
- Isachne brassii - Sulawesi, Maluku, New Guinea
- Isachne buettneri - tropical Africa
- Isachne cambodiensis - Cambodia
- Isachne carolinensis - Solomon Islands, Caroline Islands
- Isachne cernua - Réunion
- Isachne chevalieri - Vietnam
- Isachne ciliaris - Madagascar
- Isachne ciliatiflora - Sichuan
- Isachne clarkei - Southeast Asia, China, Himalayas
- Isachne clementis - Borneo
- Isachne cochinchinensis - Vietnam, Laos
- Isachne comata - New Caledonia, Vanuatu
- Isachne confusa - Southeast Asia, China, Himalayas, New Guinea, Australia
- Isachne deccanensis - Tamil Nadu
- Isachne diabolica - Sumatra
- Isachne dimyloides - Sikkim
- Isachne dioica - Vietnam
- Isachne disperma - Trinidad, Lesser Antilles
- Isachne distichophylla - Hawaii, Cook Islands
- Isachne eberhardtii - Vietnam
- Isachne elegans - India, Bhutan, Assam, Myanmar
- Isachne fischeri - Tamil Nadu, Kerala
- Isachne globosa - Asia from Oman to Japan to Maluku; Australia, New Zealand, New Guinea, Micronesia, Fiji, New Caledonia, Cook Islands
- Isachne goiasensis - Goiás, Rio de Janeiro, D.F.
- Isachne gossweileri - Angola
- Isachne gracilis - Karnataka, Maharashtra, Tamil Nadu, Madhya Pradesh
- Isachne guangxiensis - Fujian, Guangxi, Hong Kong
- Isachne guineensis - Guinea
- Isachne hainanensis - Guangdong, Hainan
- Isachne henryi - Kerala
- Isachne himalaica - Afghanistan, Tajikistan, Tibet, Nepal, Kashmir, Uttarakhand, Sikkim, Bhutan, Assam, Arunachal Pradesh, Myanmar
- Isachne hirtissima - Madagascar
- Isachne hoi - Guangdong, Hunan, Zhejiang
- Isachne homonyma - Réunion
- Isachne humbertiana - Madagascar
- Isachne humicola - Madagascar
- Isachne jayachandranii - Kerala
- Isachne kinabaluensis - Assam, Myanmar, Thailand, Vietnam, Malaysia, Borneo, Sumatra
- Isachne kiyalaensis - tropical Africa
- Isachne kunthiana - China, Nansei-shoto, Southeast Asia, Papuasia
- Isachne laevis - Réunion
- Isachne langkawiensis - Langkawi
- Isachne leersioides - Cuba
- Isachne ligulata - Guyana, Venezuela, Colombia, Peru
- Isachne lisboae - Karnataka, Maharashtra, Vietnam
- Isachne longifolia - Réunion
- Isachne lutchuensis - Nansei-shoto
- Isachne mauritiana - tropical Africa, Madagascar, Réunion, Mauritius
- Isachne meeboldii - Karnataka
- Isachne minutula - India, Sri Lanka, Southeast Asia, Australia
- Isachne multiflora - Sri Lanka
- Isachne muscicola - Madagascar
- Isachne myosotis - China, Nansei-shoto, Southeast Asia, Papuasia, Australia
- Isachne mysorensis - Karnataka
- Isachne nipponensis - China incl Taiwan, Korea, Japan incl Nansei-shoto
- Isachne obtecta - New Guinea
- Isachne oreades - Tamil Nadu
- Isachne pallens - Hawaii
- Isachne pangerangensis - Java, Sumatra, Lesser Sunda Islands, Philippines, New Guinea
- Isachne pauciflora - Taiwan, Philippines, New Guinea
- Isachne perrieri - Madagascar
- Isachne petelotii - Vietnam
- Isachne polygonoides - tropical Americas
- Isachne puberula - Thailand
- Isachne pubescens - Chiapas, Belize, Guatemala, Honduras, Veracruz
- Isachne pulchella - Asia from India to Taiwan to Philippines; New Guinea, Mariana Islands
- Isachne pygmaea - Jamaica
- Isachne rigens - Guatemala, Jamaica, Leeward Islands, Colombia, Venezuela, Peru, Ecuador
- Isachne rigidifolia - Greater + Lesser Antilles
- Isachne salzmannii - Bahia
- Isachne saxicola - Malaysia, Borneo
- Isachne scabrosa - Nepal, Sikkim, Tibet, Assam, Myanmar, Bangladesh, Bhutan, Arunachal Pradesh
- Isachne setosa - Tamil Nadu, Kerala
- Isachne sharpii - Queensland
- Isachne sikkimensis - Tibet, Nepal, Sikkim, Bhutan
- Isachne smitinandiana - Thailand, Vietnam
- Isachne stenantha - Madagascar
- Isachne swaminathanii - Sulawesi Selatan
- Isachne sylvestris - Assam, Fujian, Guangdong, Pen Malaysia, Sumatra
- Isachne trachycaula - Sumatra
- Isachne truncata - Vietnam, southern China
- Isachne vaughanii - Mauritius
- Isachne veldkampii - Karnataka
- Isachne venusta - Réunion
- Isachne villosa - Papuasia
- Isachne vitiensis - Vanuatu, Fiji
- Isachne walkeri - Sri Lanka, Tamil Nadu, Kerala

formerly included

see Chascolytrum Coelachne Cyrtococcum Panicum Streptostachys

- Isachne biflora - Panicum brevifolium
- Isachne brachyglumis - Coelachne simpliciuscula
- Isachne fauriei - Panicum sarmentosum
- Isachne filifolia - Panicum brazzavillense
- Isachne gardneri - Panicum gardneri
- Isachne hackelii - Chascolytrum poimorphum
- Isachne hispidula - Coelachne simpliciuscula
- Isachne jardinii - Cyrtococcum chaetophoron
- Isachne kidumaensis - Panicum nervatum
- Isachne kingundaensis - Cyrtococcum chaetophoron
- Isachne kinshasaensis - Panicum brazzavillense
- Isachne lamarckii - Panicum brevifolium
- Isachne margaritifera - Panicum margaritiferum
- Isachne mayocoensis - Panicum trichoides
- Isachne nervata - Panicum nervatum
- Isachne obscurans - Panicum hippothrix
- Isachne perpusilla - Coelachne perpusilla
- Isachne poimorpha - Chascolytrum poimorphum
- Isachne prostrata - Panicum horticola
- Isachne refracta - Panicum hochstetteri
- Isachne sapinii - Panicum strictissimum
- Isachne simpliciuscula - Coelachne simpliciuscula
- Isachne streptostachys - Streptostachys asperifolia
- Isachne tricarinata - Panicum brevifolium
- Isachne trochainii - Panicum tenellum
- Isachne wombaliensis - Panicum nervatum
