= Parapholis marginata =

Scientific classification
- Kingdom: Plantae
- Clade: Tracheophytes
- Clade: Angiosperms
- Clade: Monocots
- Clade: Commelinids
- Order: Poales
- Family: Poaceae
- Subfamily: Pooideae
- Genus: Parapholis
- Species: P. marginata

Binomial name
- Parapholis marginata Runemark

Species of plant

Parapholis marginata is a species of grass in the family Poaceae (true grasses).

== Sources ==
This article incorporates text from a free content work. Licensed under CC0 (license statement/permission). Text taken from Parapholis marginata. Encyclopedia of Life.
