= Ernst Gottlieb von Steudel =

German physician (1783–1856)

Ernst Gottlieb von Steudel (30 May 1783 – 12 May 1856) was a German medical doctor and an authority on grasses.

== Biography ==
Ernst Gottlieb von Steudel was born at Esslingen am Neckar in Baden-Württemberg. He was educated at the University of Tübingen, earning his medical doctorate in 1805. Shortly afterwards he settled into a medical practice in his hometown of Esslingen and in 1826 became the chief state physician in what had become the Kingdom of Württemberg.

In 1825, together with Christian Ferdinand Friedrich Hochstetter (1787–1860), he managed an organization in Esslingen known as Unio Itineraria (Württembergischer botanischer Reiseverein). The purpose of this society was to send young botanists out into the world to discover and collect plants in all of their varieties thus promoting and expanding botanical studies and herbaria throughout the Kingdom and beyond. The result was the publication and distribution of a number of exsiccatae and exsiccata-like series. The fourteen series with the title Unio itineraria are listed and described with bibliographic data in IndExs – Index of Exsiccatae. Hochstetter himself traveled to Portugal, Madeira, and the Azores, and Steudel was able to create a herbarium of over 20,000 species. Steudel and Hochstetter were the co-authors of Enumeratio plantarum Germaniae (1826).

The botanical genera Steudelago (Kuntze, 1891) and Steudelella (Honda, 1930) honor his name.

== Publications ==
- Nomenclator botanicus, 2 volumes (1821–1824), An alphabetical listing of more than 3300 genera and approximately 40,000 species.
- Enumeratio plantarum Germaniae, 1826 (with Christian Ferdinand Hochstetter).
- Synopsis planterum glumacearum, 2 volumes (1853–1855), Volume I is dedicated to the botanical family Poaceae, and Volume II involves Cyperaceae and affiliated families.
