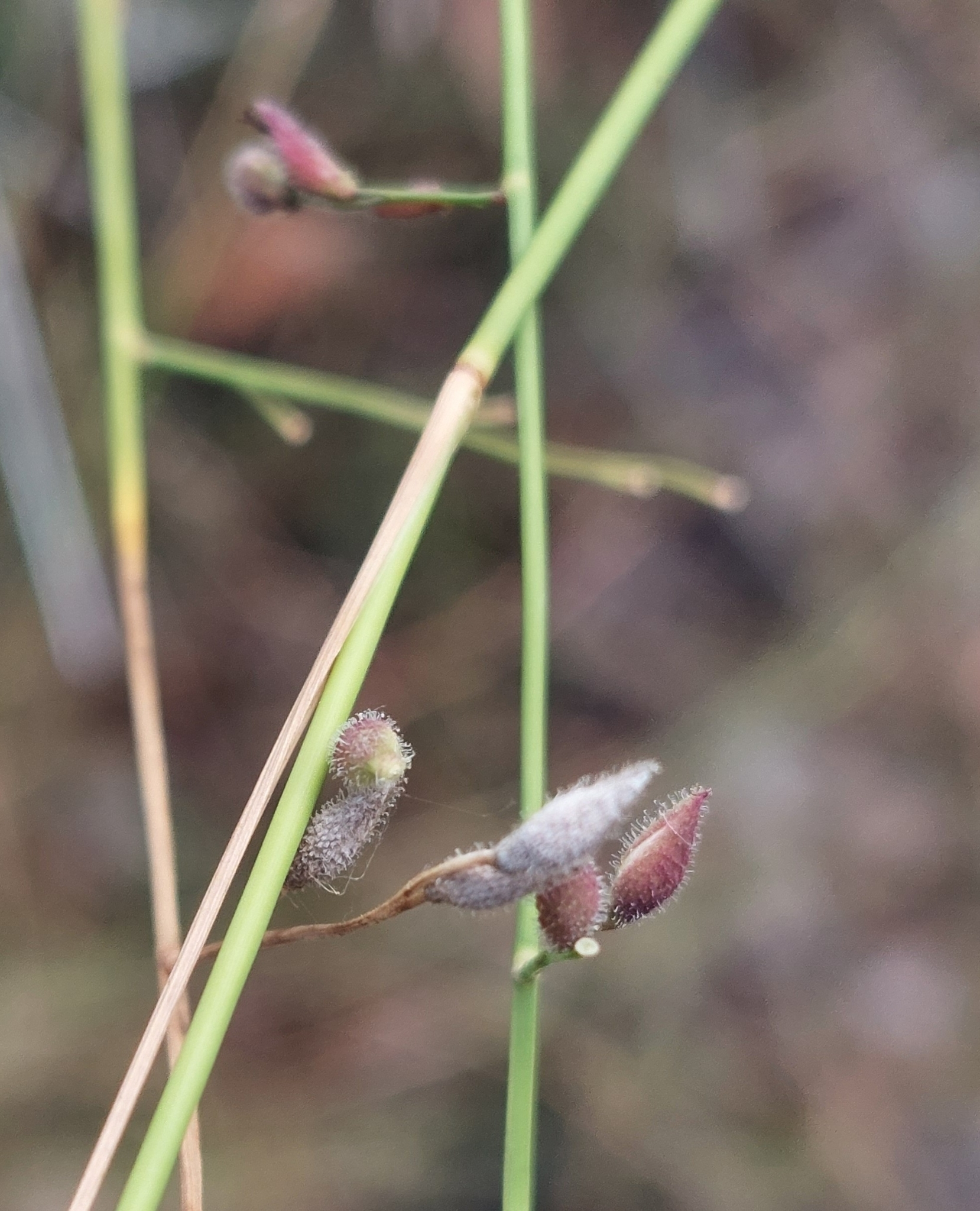

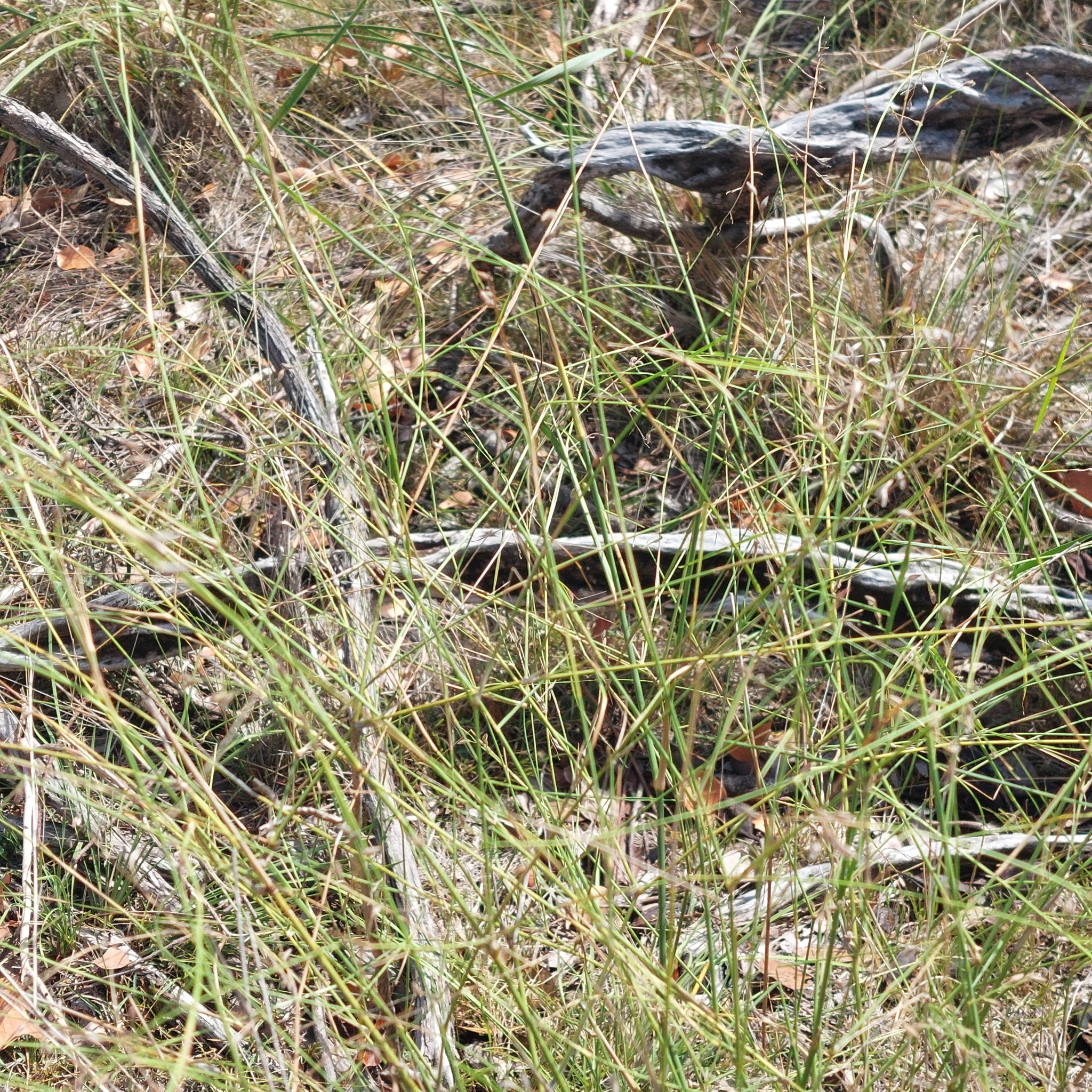

Scientific classification
- Kingdom: Plantae
- Clade: Tracheophytes
- Clade: Angiosperms
- Clade: Monocots
- Clade: Commelinids
- Order: Poales
- Family: Poaceae
- Subfamily: Panicoideae
- Genus: Ancistrachne
- Species: A. uncinulata

Binomial name
- Ancistrachne uncinulata (R.Br.) S.T.Blake

Synonyms
- Panicum uncinulatum R.Br. Cleistochloa uncinulata (R.Br.) Mabb. & D.T.Moore

= Ancistrachne uncinulata =

Species of grass

Ancistrachne uncinulata, the hooked-hairy panic grass, is a grass (Poaceae family), and was first described in 1810 as Panicum uncinulatum by Robert Brown, and then in 1941, was assigned to the genus, Ancistrachne, by Stanley Blake. The name accepted by Australian authorities is Ancistrachne uncinulata, but the name accepted by Kew (Plants of the World Online) is Cleistochloa uncinulata.

It is native to New South Wales and Queensland in Australia
