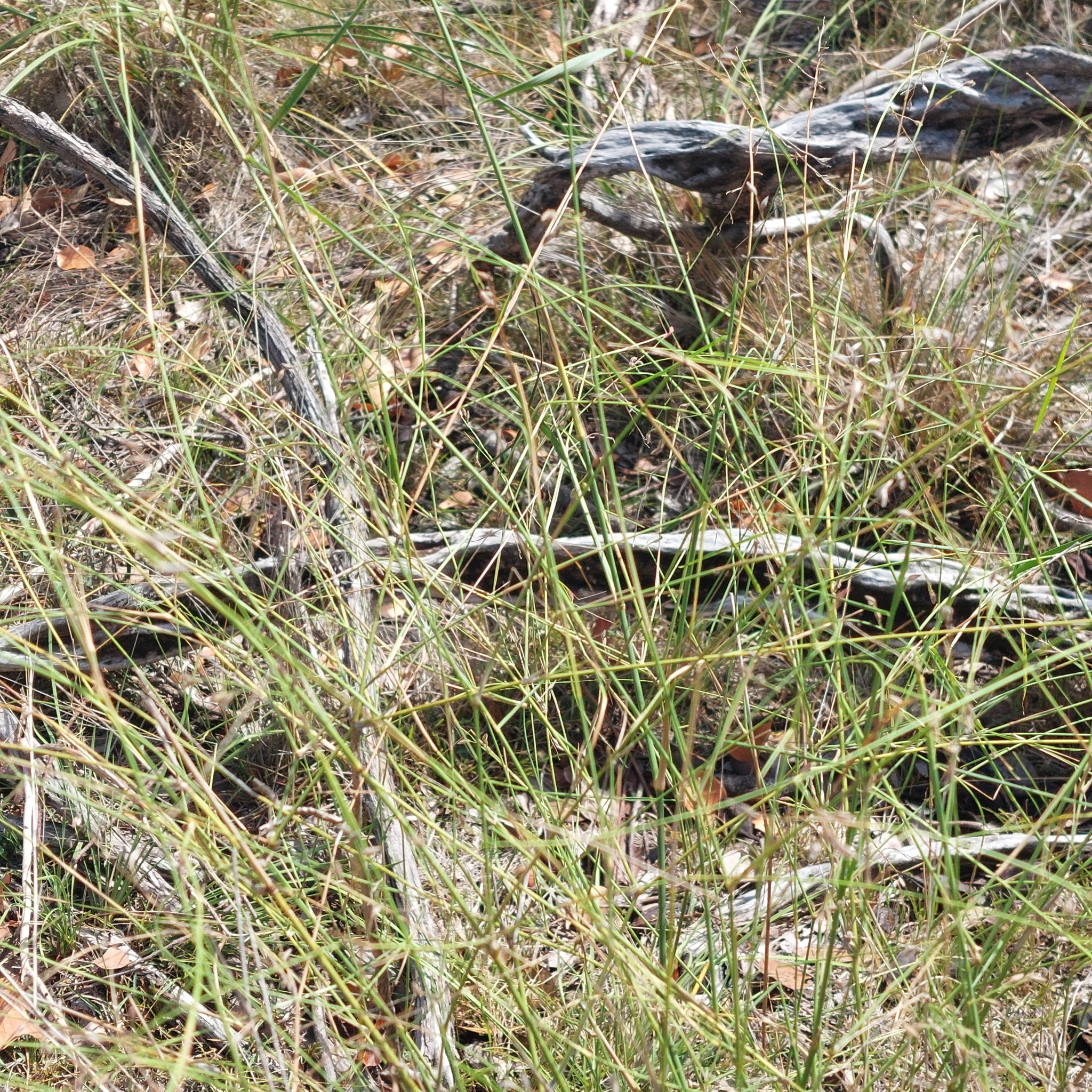
- Ancistrachne uncinulata

Scientific classification
- Kingdom: Plantae
- Clade: Tracheophytes
- Clade: Angiosperms
- Clade: Monocots
- Clade: Commelinids
- Order: Poales
- Family: Poaceae
- Subfamily: Panicoideae
- Supertribe: Panicodae
- Tribe: Paniceae
- Subtribe: Neurachninae
- Genus: Ancistrachne; S.T.Blake

Type species
- Ancistrachne uncinulata (R.Br.) S.T.Blake

= Ancistrachne =

Genus of grasses

Ancistrachne is a genus of plants in the grass family.

Species

- Ancistrachne ancylotricha (Quisumb. & Merr.) S.T.Blake - Philippines
- Ancistrachne maidenii (A.A.Ham.) Vickery - New South Wales
- Ancistrachne numaeensis (Balansa) S.T.Blake - New Caledonia
- Ancistrachne uncinulata (R.Br.) S.T.Blake - Queensland, New South Wales; introduced in Fiji

== See also ==
- List of Poaceae genera
