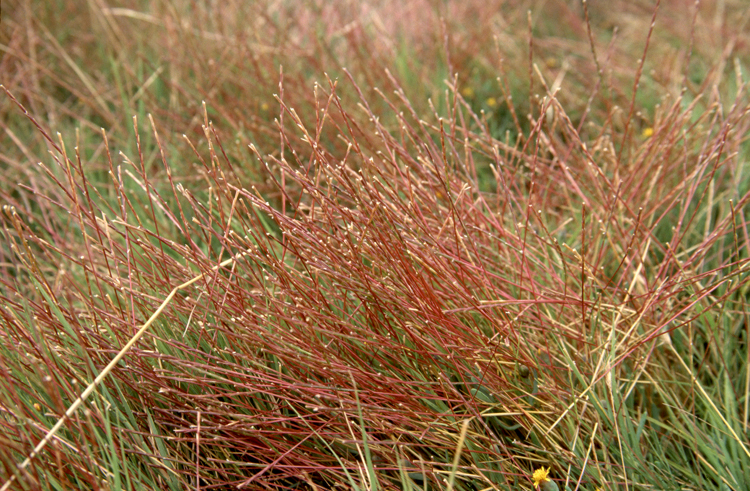

Scientific classification
- Kingdom: Plantae
- Clade: Tracheophytes
- Clade: Angiosperms
- Clade: Monocots
- Clade: Commelinids
- Order: Poales
- Family: Poaceae
- Subfamily: Pooideae
- Genus: Parapholis
- Species: P. strigosa

Binomial name
- Parapholis strigosa (Dumort.) C.E.Hubb.

= Parapholis strigosa =

Species of grass

Parapholis strigosa, commonly known as slender barb grass, sea hard grass, and hard grass, is a species of grass. It is native to Europe and Libya and is an introduced species to parts of the Americas and Oceania.

== Taxonomy ==
Prior to 1946, the species was classified as Lepturus strigosus.

== Distribution and habitat ==
=== Native ===
It is a native species to the British Isles. The species is recurrent along the coasts of the archipelago and grows on salt-affected earth along salt marshes, creeks, uneven land, and empty land.

P. strigosa is also found on the northern and western coasts of Metropolitan France. It resides in the Karavasta Lagoon of Albania. In Greece, it is only found on the Ionian Islands. It is also native to the Netherlands, Sweden, Italy, Denmark, Germany, Belgium, Spain, Portugal, Luxembourg, Slovenia, Croatia, and Monaco.

Outside of Europe it is a native species to Libya.

=== Non-native ===
It is a non-native species to California, residing in the North Coast region, notably in Humboldt Bay. P. strigosa is present on the west coast of North America to British Columbia and is found in central and southern Chile. In Oceania, it resides in southern parts of Australia and was introduced to New Zealand in 1944.
