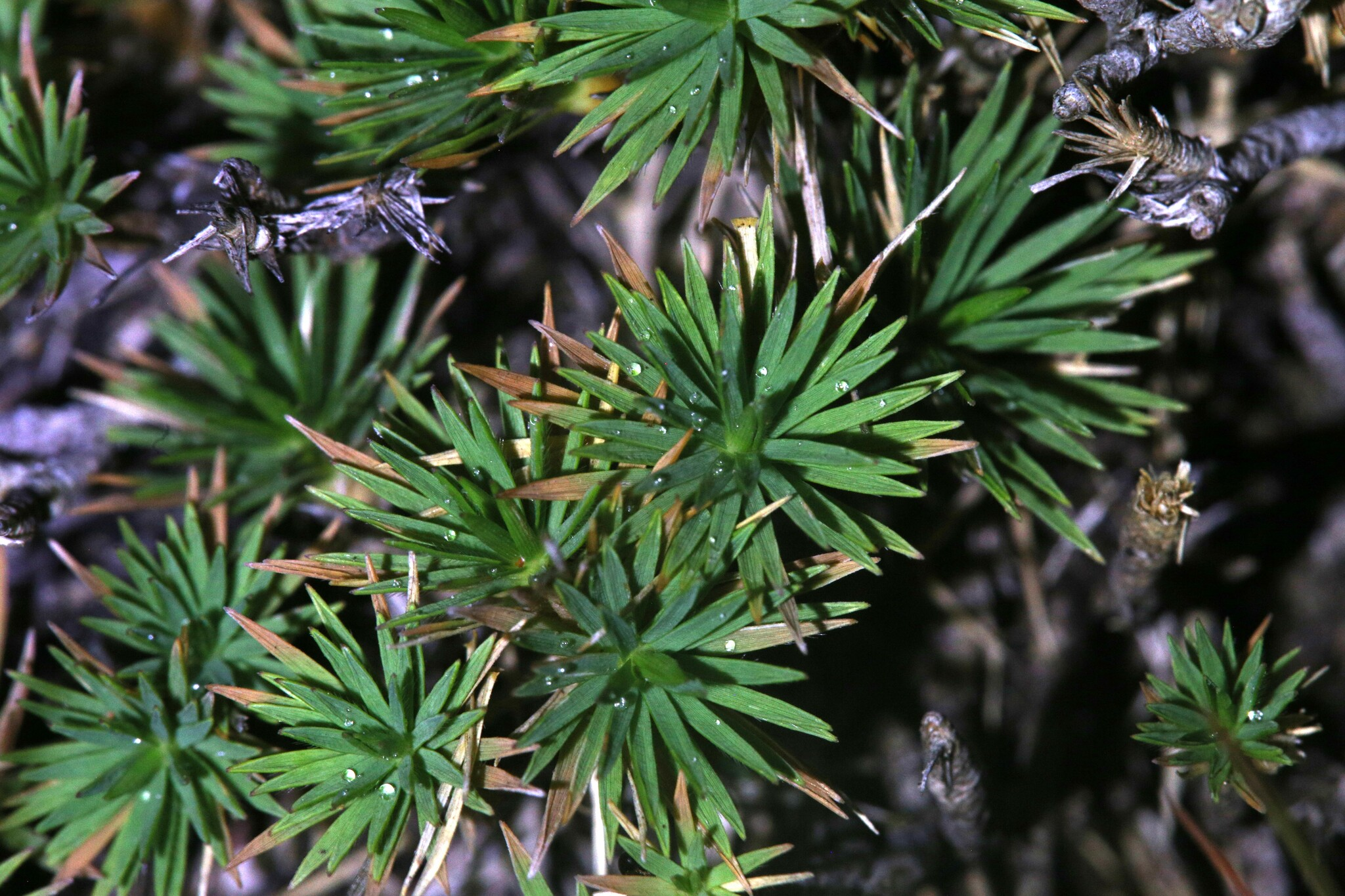
- M. subulifolia

Scientific classification
- Kingdom: Plantae
- Clade: Tracheophytes
- Clade: Angiosperms
- Clade: Monocots
- Clade: Commelinids
- Order: Poales
- Family: Poaceae
- Clade: PACMAD clade
- Subfamily: Micrairoideae
- Tribe: Micraireae; Pilg. (1956)
- Genus: Micraira; F.Muell.

Type species
- Micraira subulifolia F.Muell.

= Micraira =

Genus of grasses

Micraira is the only genus of tribe Micraireae in the grass family, native to Australia.

Species

- Micraira adamsii
- Micraira brevis
- Micraira compacta
- Micraira dentata
- Micraira dunlopii
- Micraira inserta
- Micraira lazaridis
- Micraira multinervia
- Micraira pungens
- Micraira spiciforma
- Micraira spinifera
- Micraira subspicata
- Micraira subulifolia
- Micraira tenuis
- Micraira viscidula
