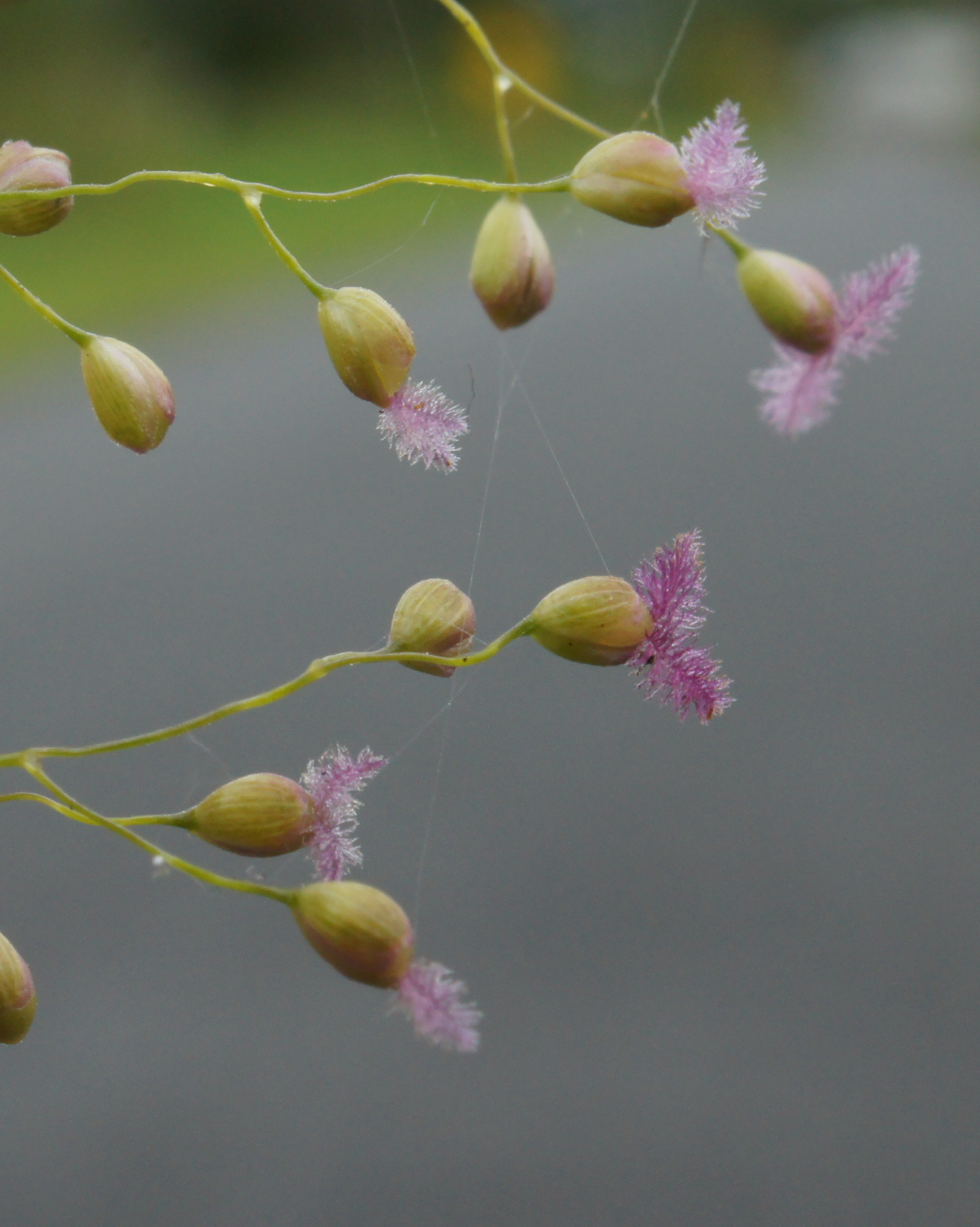

Scientific classification
- Kingdom: Plantae
- Clade: Tracheophytes
- Clade: Angiosperms
- Clade: Monocots
- Clade: Commelinids
- Order: Poales
- Family: Poaceae
- Genus: Isachne
- Species: I. globosa

Binomial name
- Isachne globosa (Thunb.) Kuntze

= Isachne globosa =

Species of plant

Isachne globosa, commonly known as swamp millet, is a species of plant in the true grass family. It is widespread throughout South East Asia, Japan, Australia, and New Zealand.

== Description ==
Isachne globosa is an aquatic or semi-aquatic perennial grass up to 0.7m high. It has distinctive 2-2.5mm globose spikelets, with pink stigmas.

== Distribution ==
Isachne globosa is native in Oman, South Asia, South East Asia, China, Japan, Korea, Papua New Guinea, Australia, and New Zealand.

In New Zealand, I. globosa is common in the upper North Island, but becomes uncommon in south of Manawatu River. In the South Island, it is only found on the West Coast at Mahers Swamp.

== Habitat ==
Isachne globosa is strictly a wetland plant, existing on the edges of swamps and lake margins, or in deep gullies. Throughout much of Asia, I. globosa is a weed of rice paddies, often impacting rice yield.
