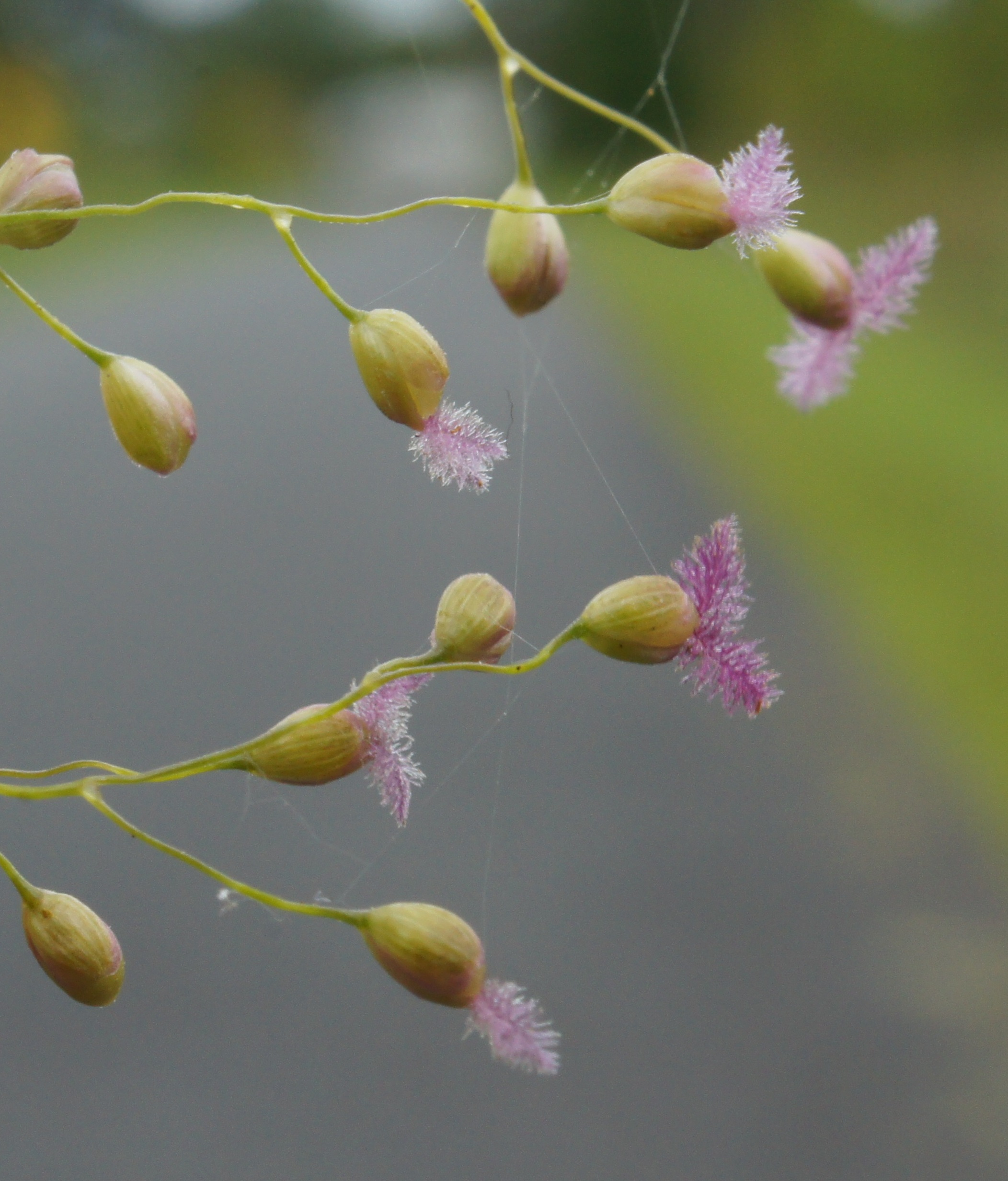
- Isachne globosa spikelets

Scientific classification
- Kingdom: Plantae
- Clade: Tracheophytes
- Clade: Angiosperms
- Clade: Monocots
- Clade: Commelinids
- Order: Poales
- Family: Poaceae
- Clade: PACMAD clade
- Subfamily: Micrairoideae; Pilg. (1956)

Tribes
- Eriachneae; Isachneae; Micraireae

= Micrairoideae =

Subfamily of plants

Micrairoideae is a subfamily of the grass family Poaceae, distributed in tropical and subtropical regions. Within the PACMAD clade, it is sister to subfamily Arundinoideae.

It includes roughly 190 species in nine genera. A phylogenetic classification of the grasses recognises four main lineages, classified as tribes. Only species in tribe Eriachneae (genera Eriachne and Pheidochloa) have evolved the C_{4} photosynthetic pathway.

== Phylogeny ==
Relationships of tribes in the Micrairoideae according to a 2017 phylogenetic classification, also showing the Arundinoideae as sister group:

- Arundinoideae
- Micrairoideae
  - Micraireae
  - - Eriachneae
    - Isachneae
